= Winter landscapes in Western art =

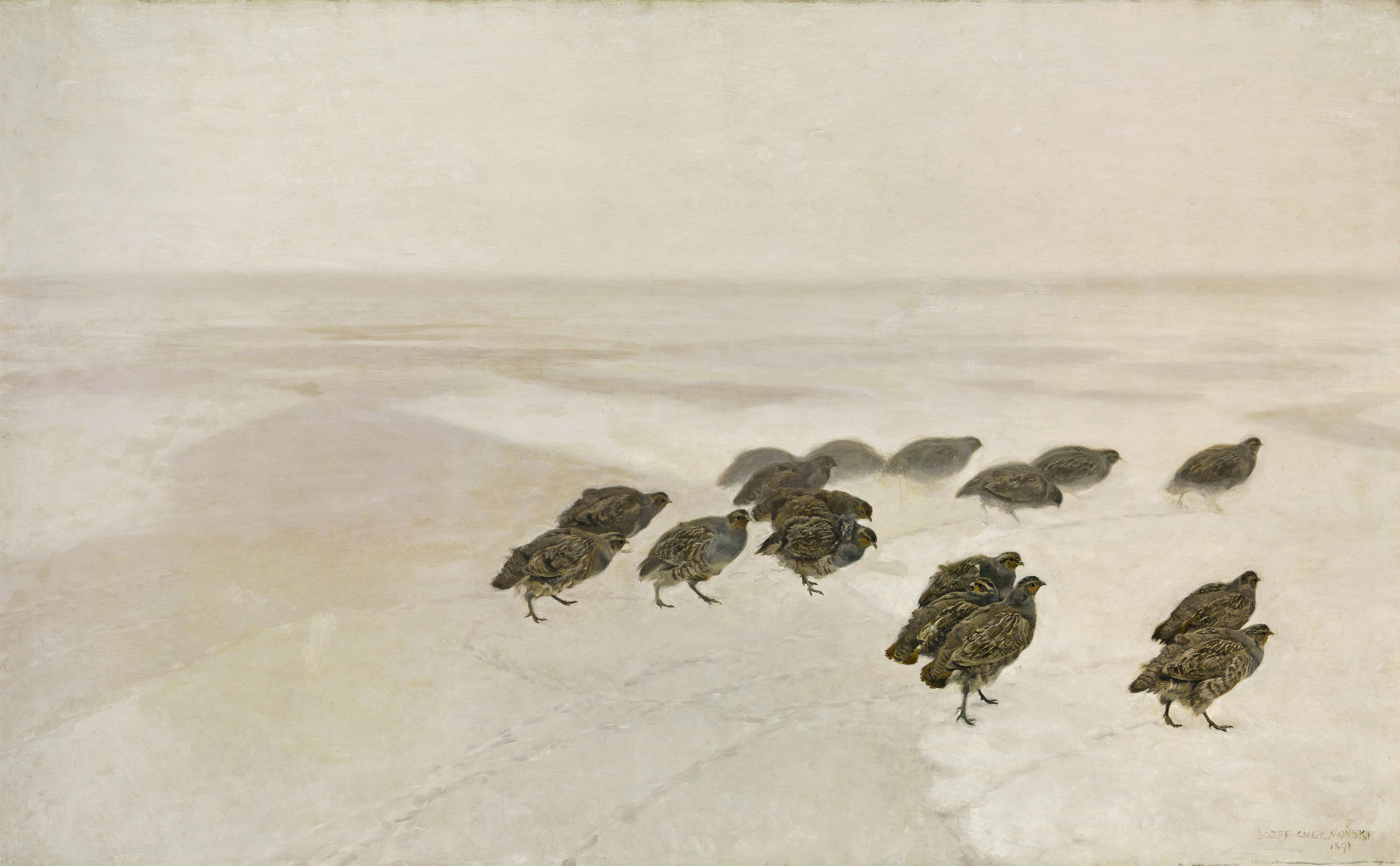
Józef Chełmoński: Partridges in the snow, 1891

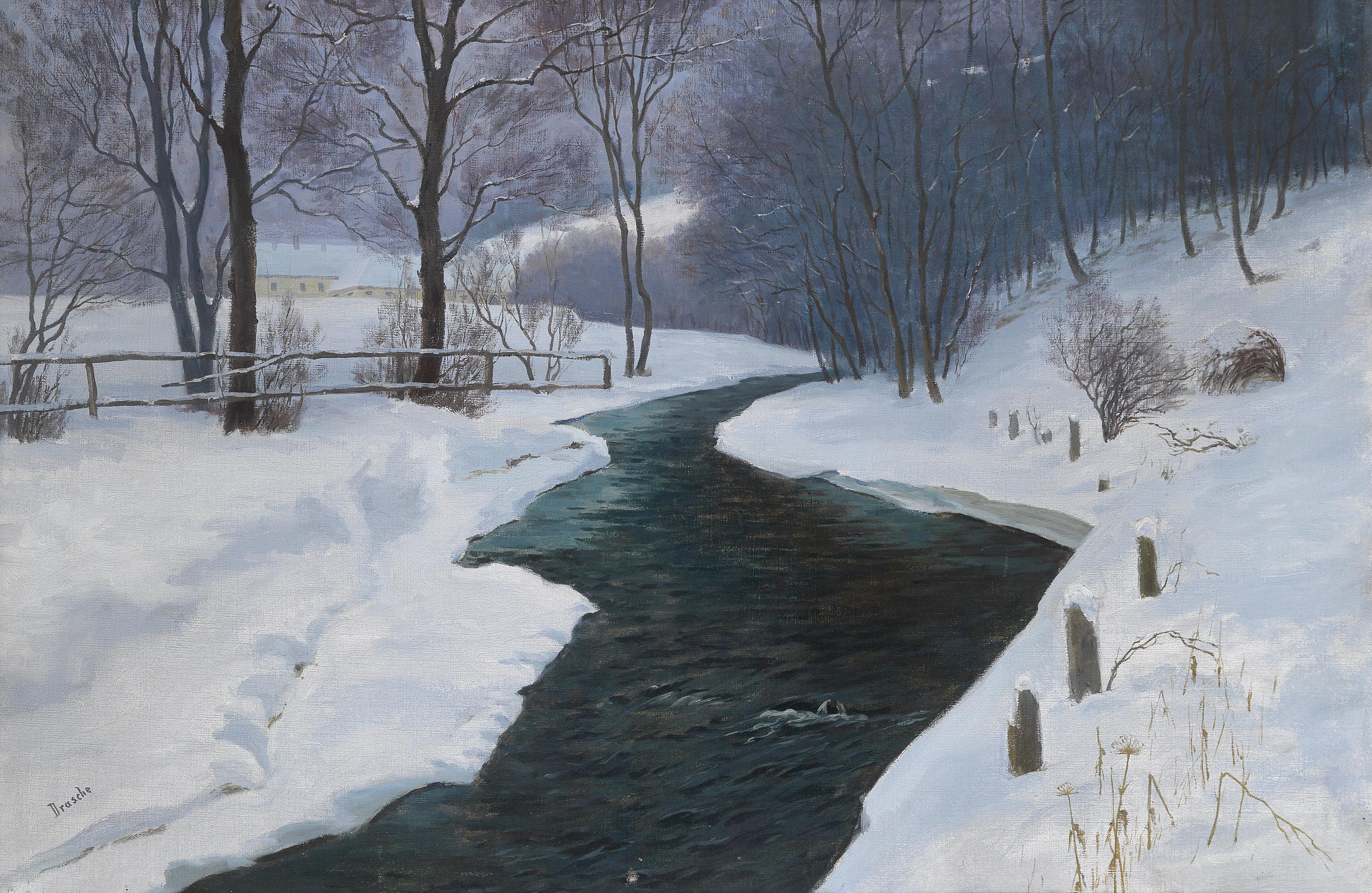
Richard von Drasche-Wartinberg: In Deep Winter

The depiction of winter landscapes in Western art begins in the 15th century, as does landscape painting in general. Wintry and snowy landscapes are very rarely seen in earlier European painting since most of the subjects were religious. Gold ground paintings had no painted backgrounds and other narrative scenes had highly stylized trees and mountains.

In the 15th century, the calendar pages of the most lavishly decorated books of hours, giving the dates of feast days important to the owner, began to include miniatures of the Labours of the Months. Much the most famous of these sets of scenes is in Les Très Riches Heures du duc de Berry, from the beginning of the period. By the last quarter of the century, manuscripts of the Ghent–Bruges school often include a set, including two or three winter scenes for the coldest months, some with a snowy landscape.

The snowy landscape as a genre in painting really begins in the 1560's with five paintings by Pieter Bruegel the Elder made between 1563 and perhaps 1567. Two of these in particular were copied many times over the following decades, and other artists also created their own snowy compositions. Several painters came to specialize in such scenes in Dutch Golden Age painting.

Fierce weather and snow appealed to Romantic painters, and later the Impressionists. As Russian painting took to landscapes in the 19th century, snow unsurprisingly often features. The depiction of snow in Europe is mainly a northern European subject.

== History ==
=== Between Renaissance and the eve of Romanticism ===
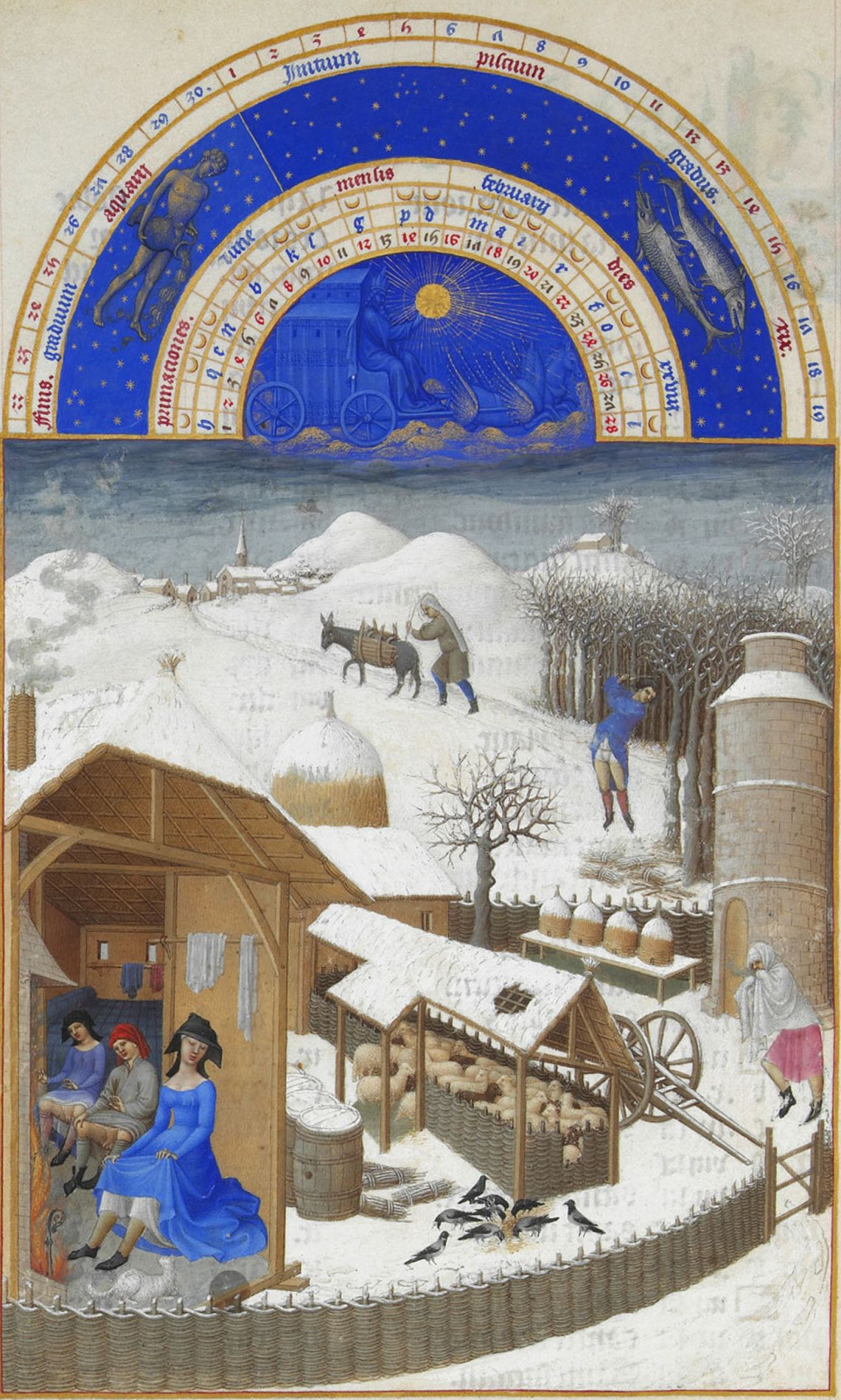
February, attributed to Paul Limbourg, or the "Rustic painter", 1412 and 1416, Musée Condé.

Early European painters generally did not depict snow since most of their paintings were of religious subjects. The first artistic representations of snow came in the 15th and 16th centuries. Because frequent snowfall is a part of winter in northern European countries, depiction of snow in Europe began first in the northern European countries.

Since the early 15th century, wintry scenes had been represented by artists in parts of large sculptural works on churches and even on a smaller scale in private devotional scripts such as the book of hours, a devotional collection of texts, prayers and psalms. These were often illuminated manuscripts such as Labours of the Months, a cycle of twelve paintings that illustrated the social life, the agricultural tasks, the weather, and the landscape for each month of the year. January and February were typically shown as snowy, as is February in the famous cycle of the Les Très Riches Heures du duc de Berry, illustrated 1412–1416. Some snowy scenes also appear in the Cycle of the Months, a set of early 14th-century frescoes created by Master Wenceslas for the Bishop's Palace at Trento, showing people throwing snowballs at each other, and in a detail of Ambrogio Lorenzetti's Effects of Good Government in the City and Countryside (1337–39). At that time, landscapes had not yet developed as a genre in art, which explains the scarcity of winter scenes in medieval painting. Snow was not depicted in art except where it had a context, such as in the winter months of calendars.

==== Bruegel ====
During the Early Northern Renaissance and even more during Dutch Golden Age painting in the 17th century, interest in landscape painting was increasing. The winter of 1564–1565 was said to be the longest and most severe for more than a hundred years – the beginning of a cold period in northern Europe now called the Little Ice Age. For the next 150 years, northern European winters were comparatively snowy and harsh. Crop failures, heavy snowfalls and advancing glaciers that consumed Alpine pastures and villages made the era a grim one for European peasants.

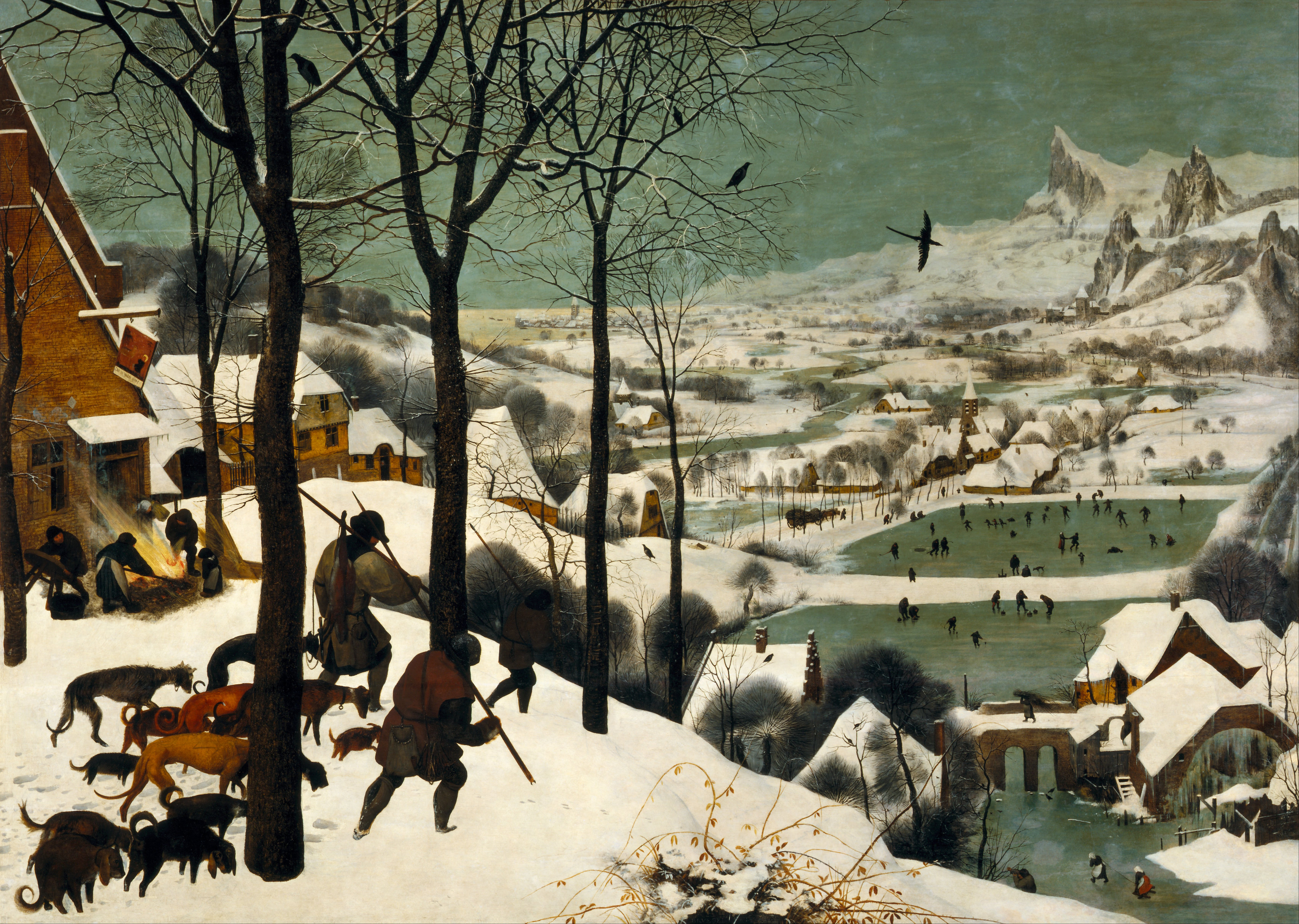
Pieter Bruegel the Elder, The Hunters in the Snow, 1565, oil on wood, Kunsthistorisches Museum

It was early in the frigid winter of 1565 that Bruegel created The Hunters in the Snow. It was part of a series that illustrated the months, something thematically similar to the traditional Flemish books of hours (e.g. the Très Riches Heures du Duc de Berry). In addition to the snowy Hunters (December–January), it included The Harvesters (August). The Hunters depicts village life in a snowbound Flemish setting, showing not only hunters with pikes trudging off with their dogs to seek game, but also villagers gathered around a fire, frozen ponds with skaters, and houses and churches in the distance – all against a fanciful backdrop of snow-covered mountains. The series was commissioned in 1565 by a wealthy patron in Antwerp, Niclaes Jonghelinck. The paintings by Flemish artist Pieter Bruegel the Elder were on a larger scale than calendar paintings; they measured approximately three feet by five feet (0.9 by 1.5 meters).

Bruegel continued to depict snow in his paintings. He created the first nativity scene to include snow, Adoration of the Magi in a Winter Landscape, which is also the earliest known painting to actually depict falling snow. He also started a vogue for Netherlandish winter painting. The popularity of landscapes in the Netherlands was in part a reflection of the virtual disappearance of religious painting in a now Protestant (Calvinist) society, which preferred non-religious themes such as still life, genre painting, and landscape painting. The tradition of painting landscapes continued well into the 19th century and developed into the Romantic landscape. Between 1780 and 1820, following the initial vogue in the 16th century for Netherlandish winter landscapes, winter subjects again become popular. However, this time winter landscapes became popular in their own right, as the beginning of the Romantic movement created a new interest in the landscape. This new interest, combined with the decline of religious painting in the 18th and 19th centuries all over Europe, gave landscape painting for its own sake, not simply as a backdrop to a scene or a setting, a much greater and more prestigious place in 19th-century art than it had held earlier.

==== Bruegel's other snow paintings ====
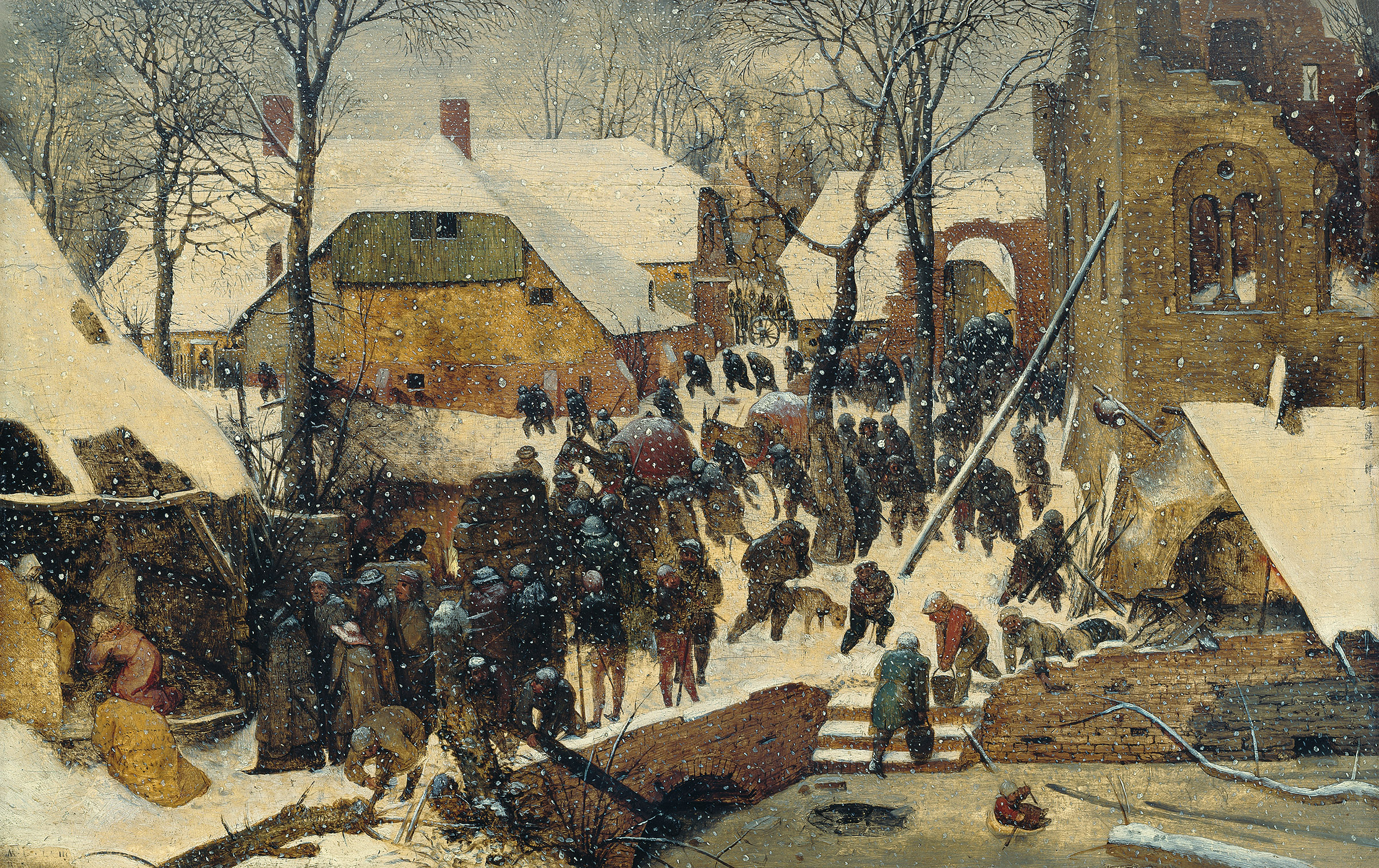
Adoration of the Magi in the Snow (1563)

Winter Landscape with Ice skaters and Bird trap (1565)

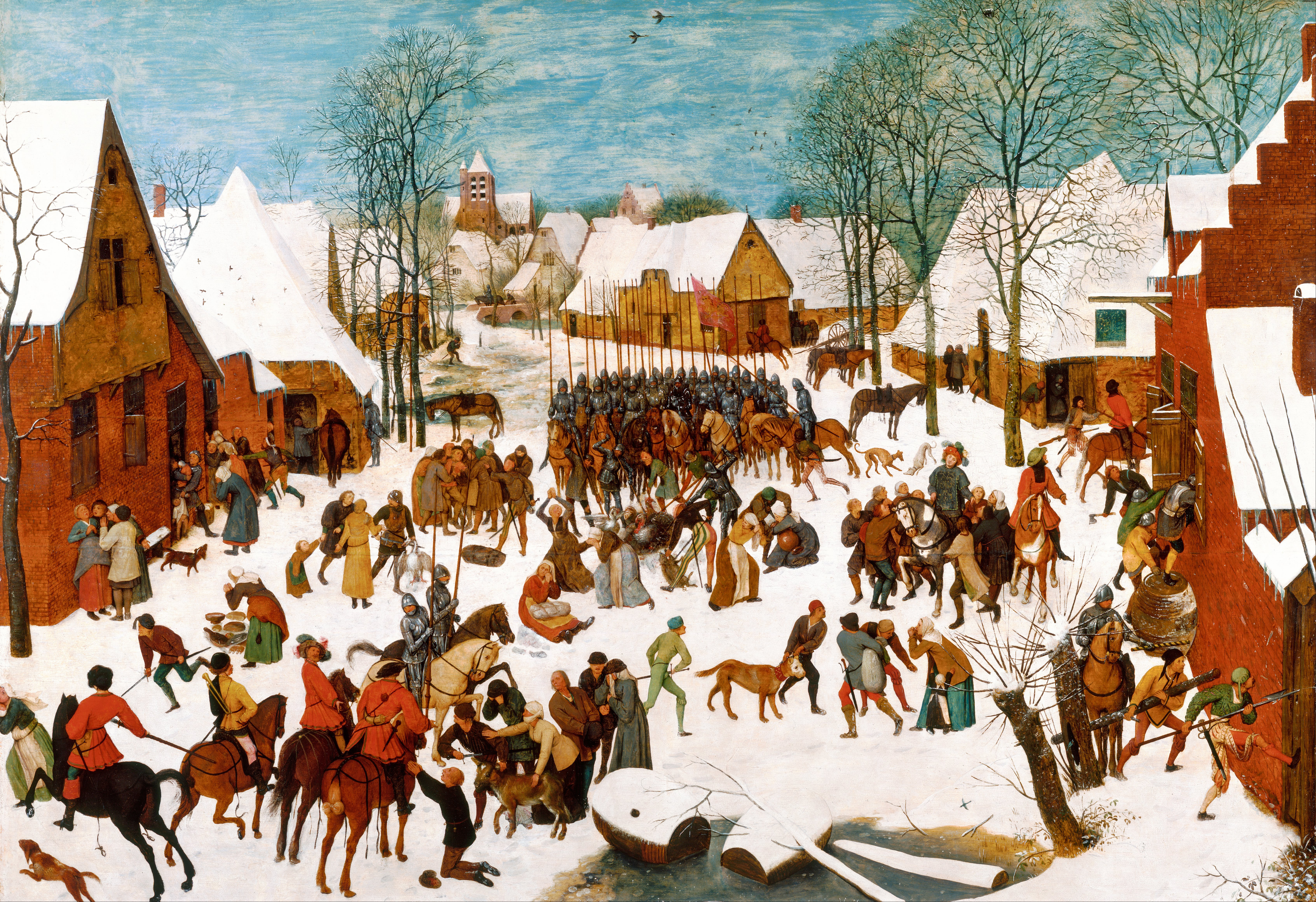
Massacre of the Innocents (c.1565-1567)

The Census at Bethlehem (1566)

=== Romantic landscape painting ===
Caspar David Friedrich: Winter Landscape (c. 1811)

Later, after a relatively warm period that coincided with the end of the 17th century Dutch Golden Age, the European climate turned cool again, heading for a trough whose lowest point was in the second decade of the 19th century. In 1809, a series of major volcanic eruptions heralded the arrival of a particularly cold period as the clouds of ash partially blocked out the sun. The decade from 1810 to 1819 was the coldest in England since the 17th century. In 1812, the French Grande Armée was forced to retreat from Moscow by the advancing winter – known to the Russians as General Snow. These climactic events played a great part in the development of a new art genre, the winter landscape.

In the late 18th century, the growing Romantic movement intensified interest in landscape painting, including winter landscapes. Practitioners included the German artist Caspar David Friedrich, who depicted remote and wild landscapes. Caspar David Friedrich was a romantic landscape painter, and was one of the first artists to portray winter landscapes as austere, forbidding and desolate. His winter scenes are solemn and still. They are often painted plein-air, with the artist using the thin, gray light of winter to create an appropriate atmosphere and illustrate the effect of light reflected off snow. According to the art historian Hermann Beenken, Friedrich painted winter scenes in which "no man has yet set his foot". Although based on direct observation, his landscapes did not reproduce nature but were painted to create a dramatic effect, using nature as a mirror of human emotions. His aim was a reunion with the spiritual self through the contemplation of nature, paralleling Romanticism's validation of intense emotions such as apprehension, fear, horror, terror and awe. Awe in particular – experienced when confronting the sublimity of untamed nature and its picturesque qualities – drew Friedrich's interest, as seen in his idealized portrayals of coasts, forests and craggy mountains. Friedrich created the notion of a landscape full of romantic feeling – die romantische Stimmungslandschaft. His works detail a wide range of geographical features, and he used the landscape as an expression of religious mysticism.

Along with other Romantic painters, Friedrich helped position landscape painting as a major genre within Western art. His style influenced his contemporary, the Norwegian Johan Christian Dahl (1788–1857), and, later, Arnold Böcklin (1827–1901) and many Russian painters, in particular Arkhip Kuindzhi (c. 1842–1910) and Ivan Shishkin (1832–98).

Romantic works

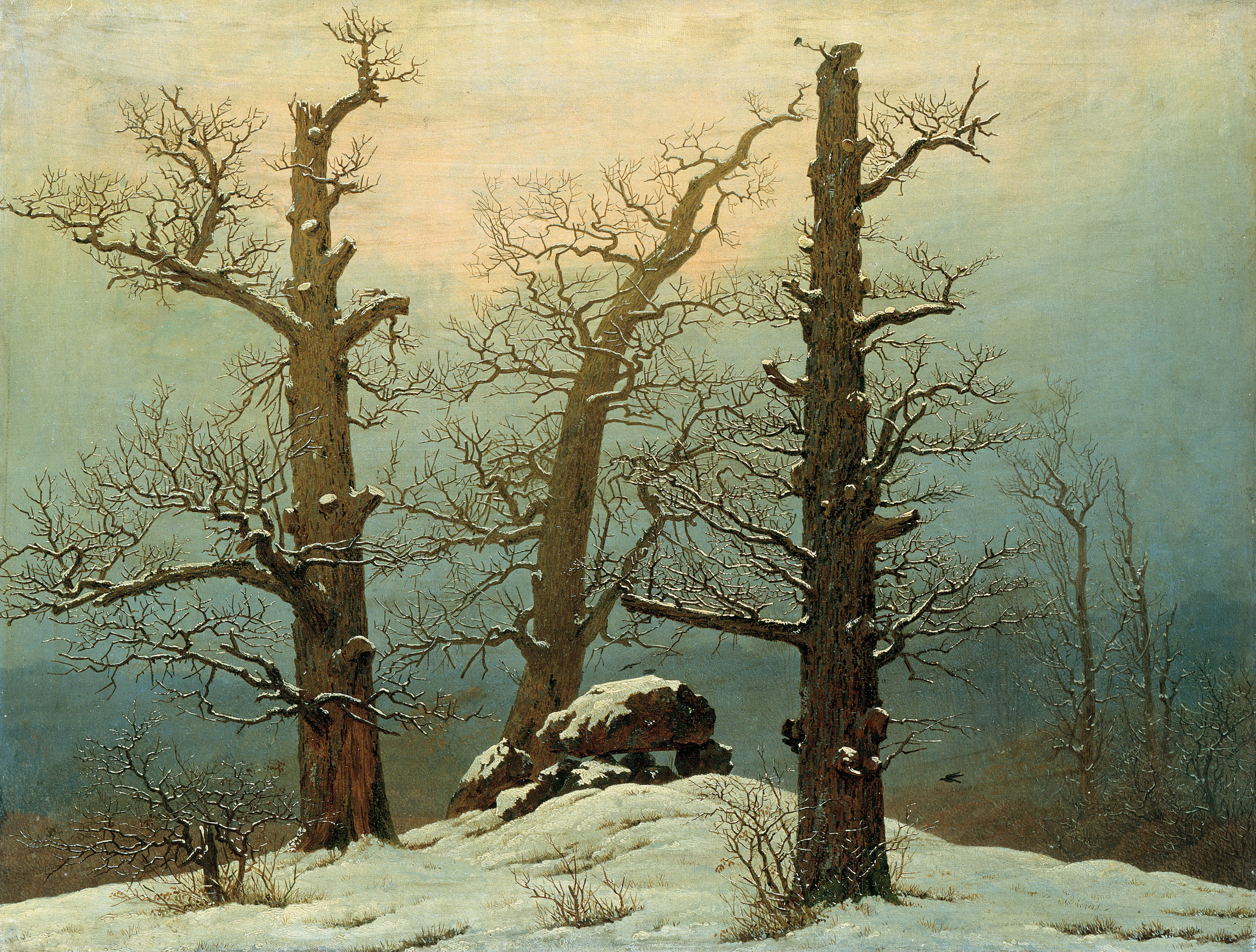
Caspar David Friedrich: Cairn in Snow (1807)

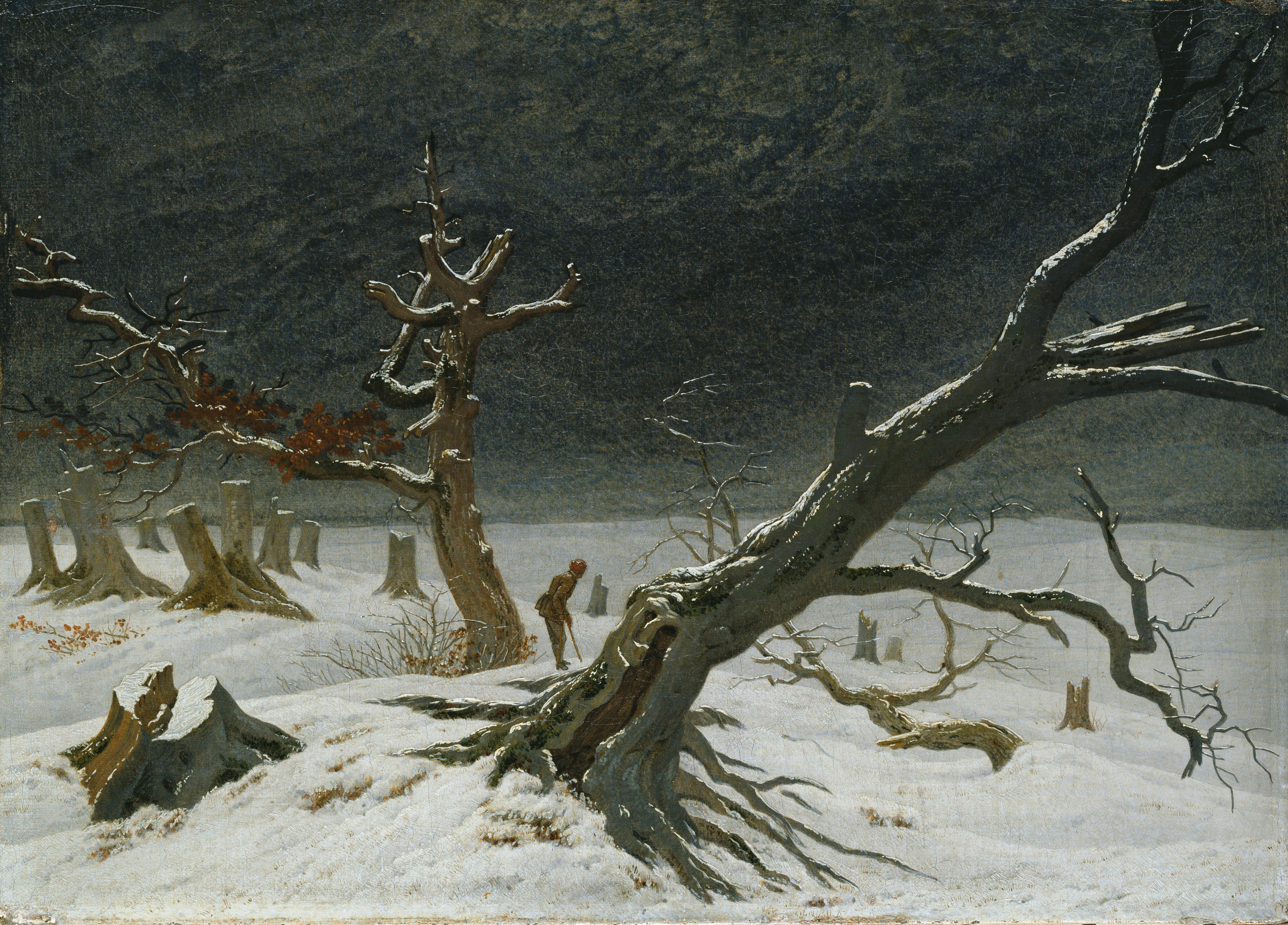
Caspar David Friedrich: Winter Landscape (1811)

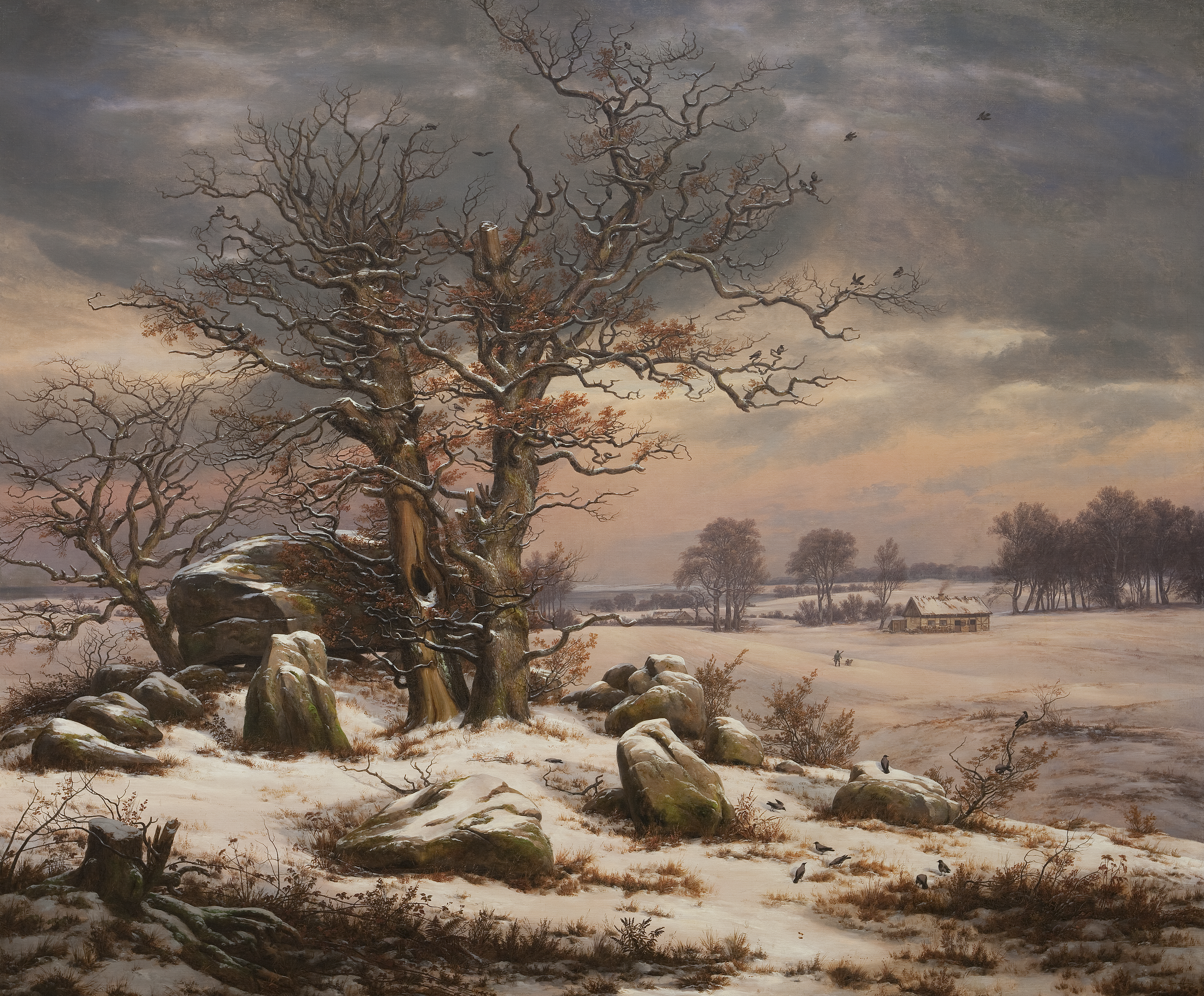
Johan Christian Dahl: Winter landscape at Vordingborg

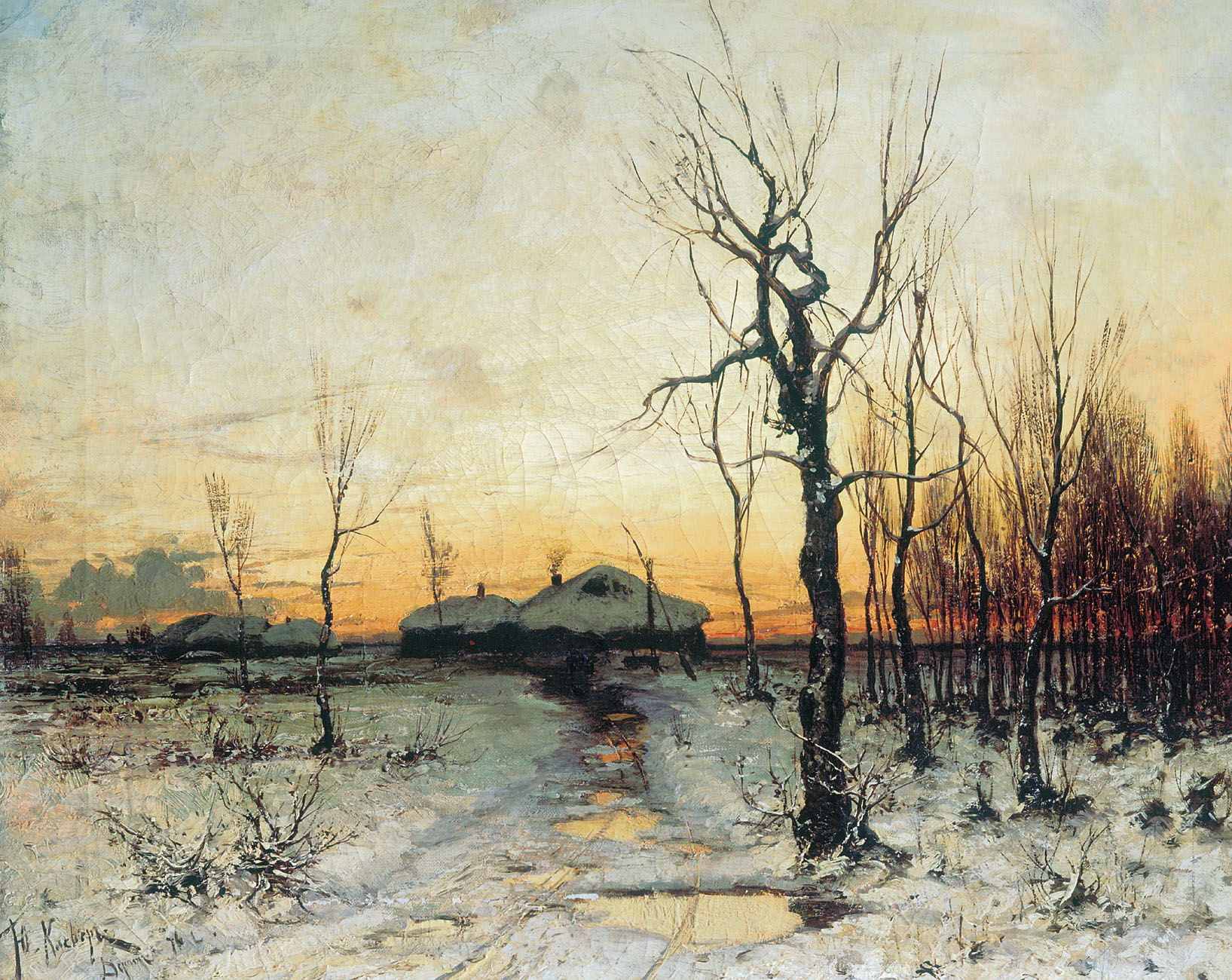
Julius von Klever: Thaw on the Way

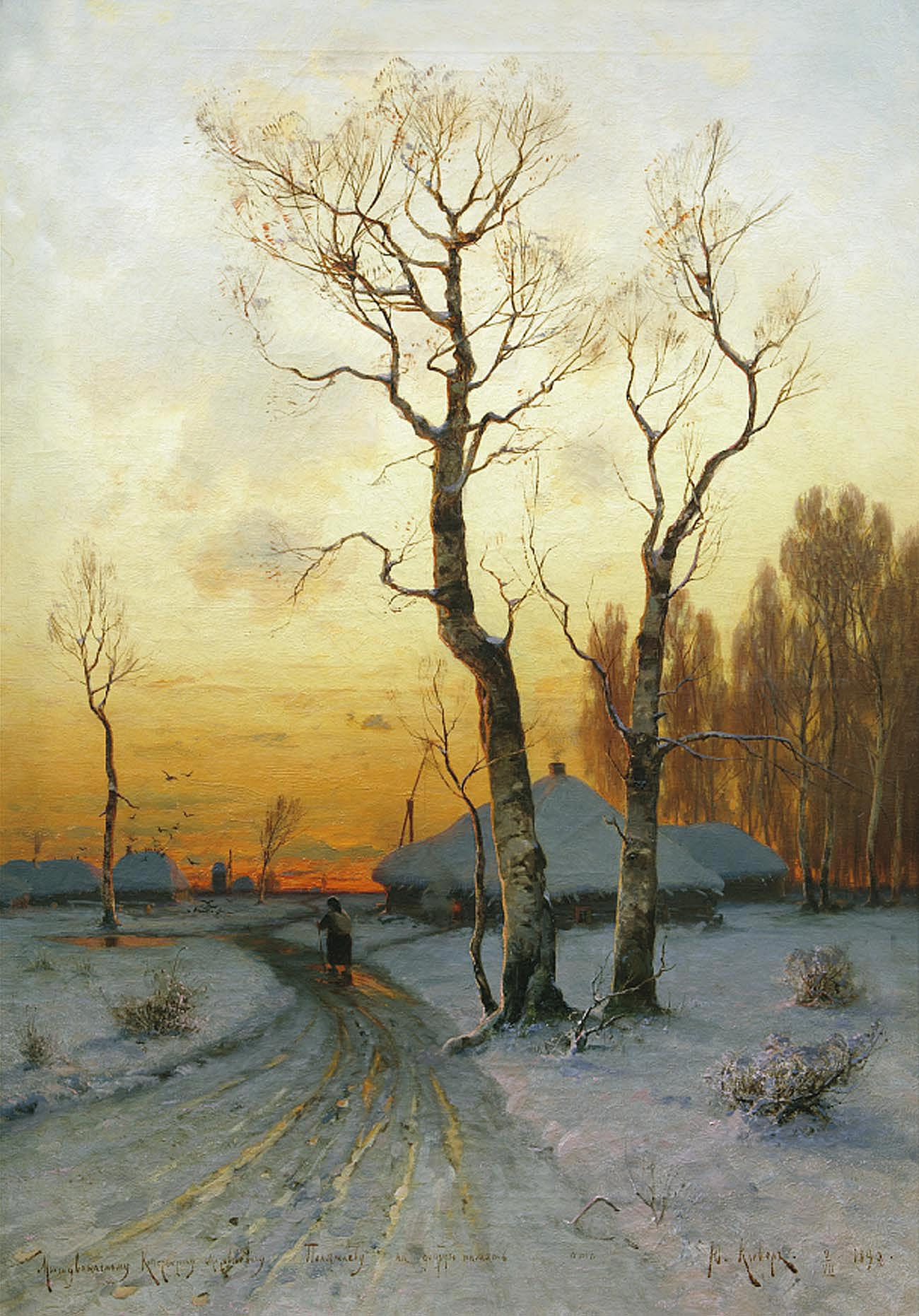
Von Klever: Winter (1876)

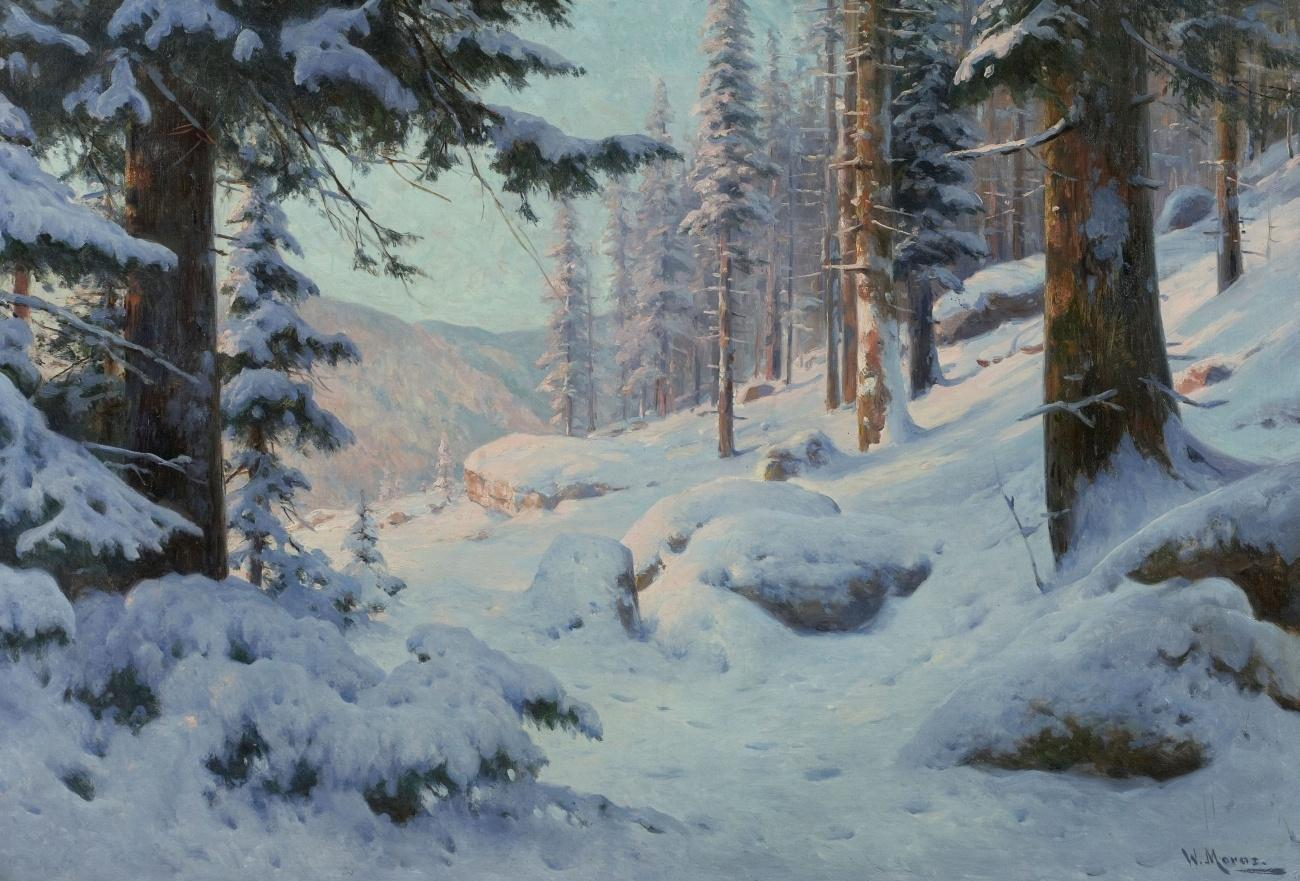
Walter Moras: Snowy Forest Landscape

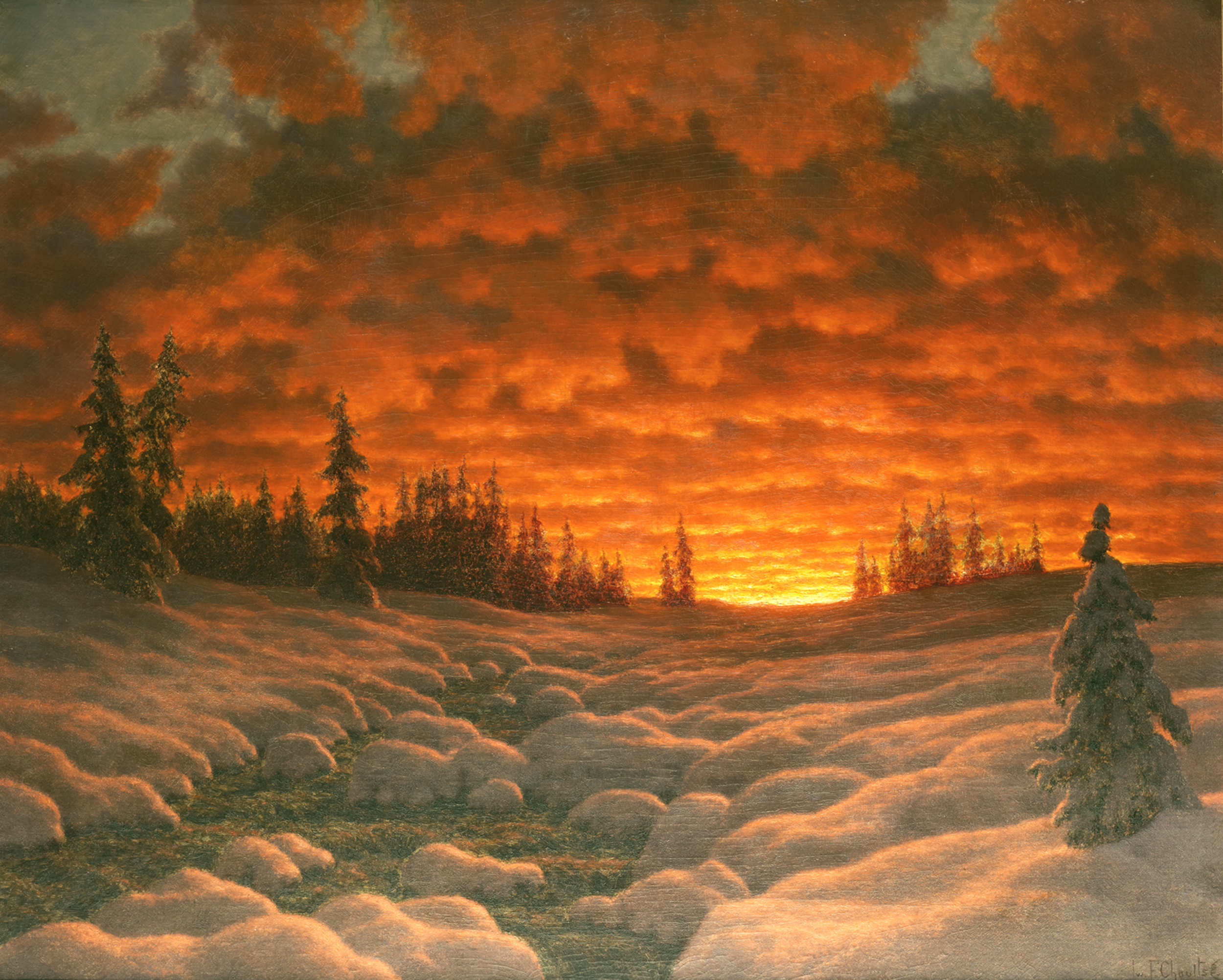
Ivan Choultsé: Winter Sunset (1920s)

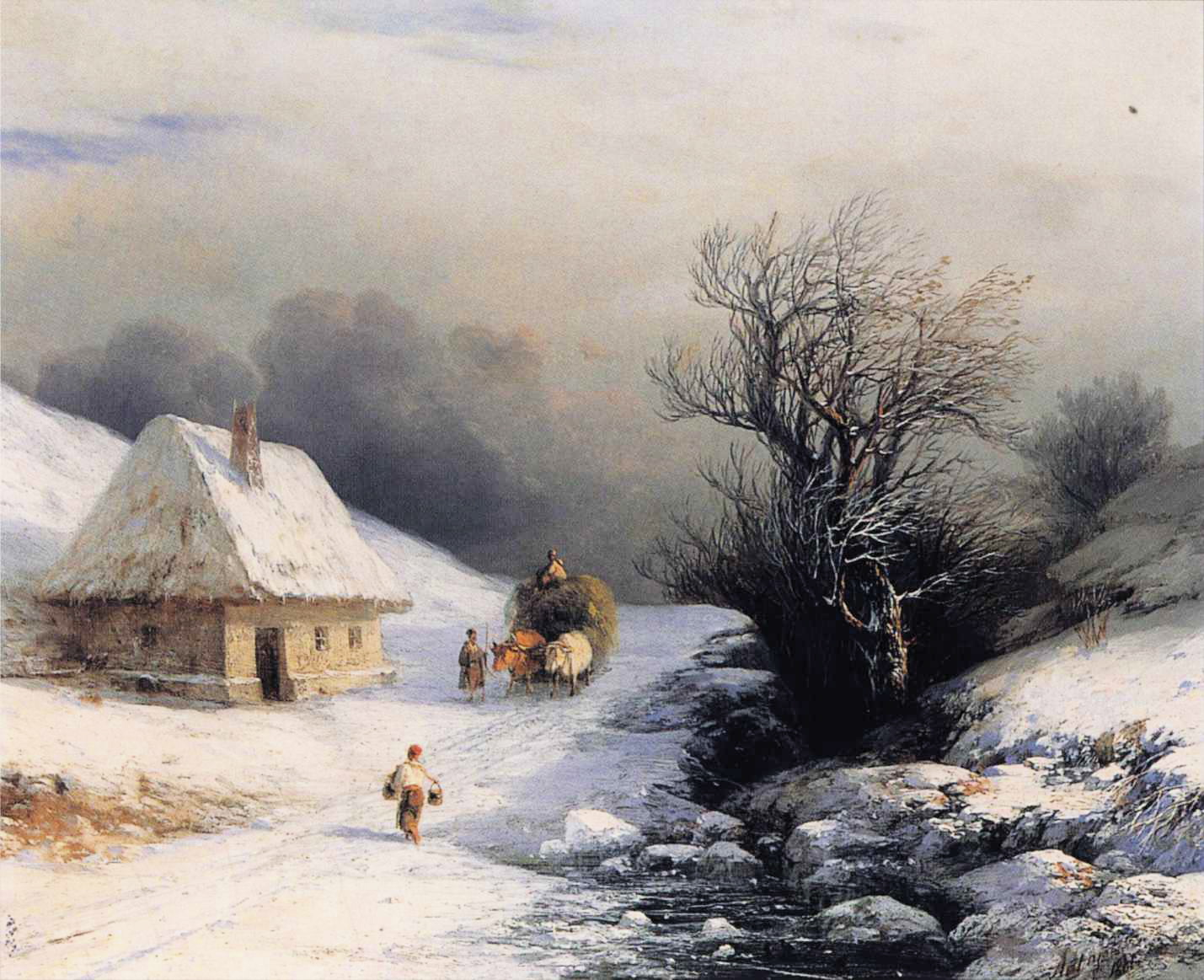
Ivan Aivazovsky: Little Russian Ox Cart

The work of the 19th-century Düsseldorf School is characterized by finely detailed but still fanciful landscapes, often portraying religious or allegorical stories. Leading members of the Düsseldorf School advocated plein-air painting and tended to use a palette of relatively subdued and muted colors. The Düsseldorf School grew out of, and was a part of, the German Romantic movement. Prominent members of the Düsselorf School included Friedrich Wilhelm Schadow, Rudolf Koller, Karl Friedrich Lessing, Johann Wilhelm Schirmer, Andreas Achenbach, Hans Fredrik Gude, Oswald Achenbach and Adolf Schrödter.

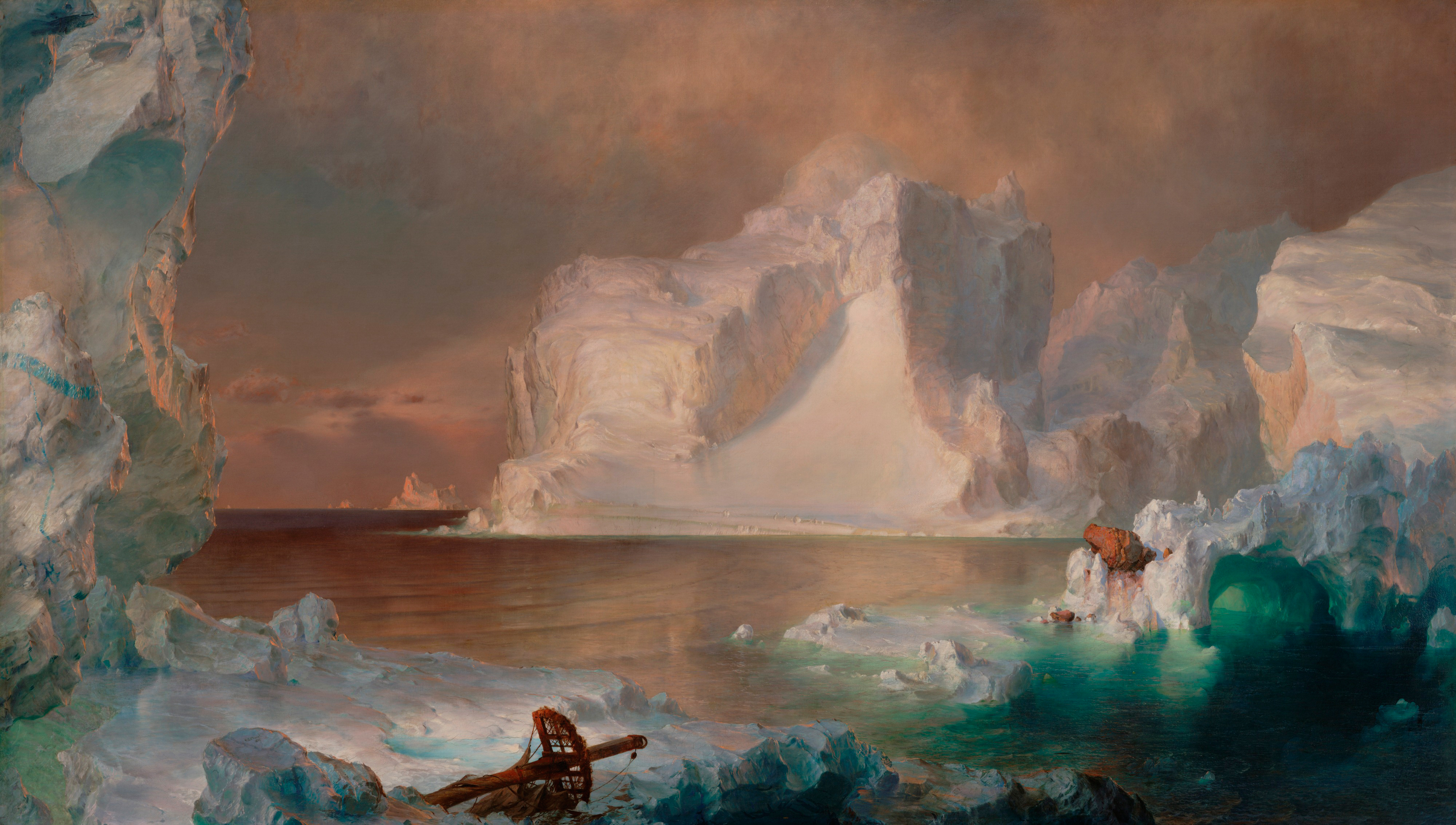
The Icebergs by Frederic Edwin Church, (1861), Dallas Museum of Art

French painters were slower to develop landscape painting, but from about the 1830s Jean-Baptiste-Camille Corot and other artists of the Barbizon School established a French landscape tradition that in the 19th century would become the most influential in Europe.

It is often assumed that plein-air painting started with the 19th-century Impressionists, but in fact it was already common in the late 18th century when the members of the Hudson River School of American landscape painters were already painting in plein-air. Frederic Edwin Church, a central figure in the Hudson River School, was known for painting large landscapes that he saw during his travels to the Arctic and Central and South America.

Plein-air painting, in its strictest sense, is the practice of painting landscape pictures out-of-doors; more loosely, the achievement of an intense impression of the open air (French: plein air) in a landscape painting. Until the time of the painters of the Barbizon school in mid-19th-century France, it was normal practice to execute rough sketches of landscape subjects in the open air and produce finished paintings in the studio. Part of this was a matter of convenience.

=== Impressionists ===
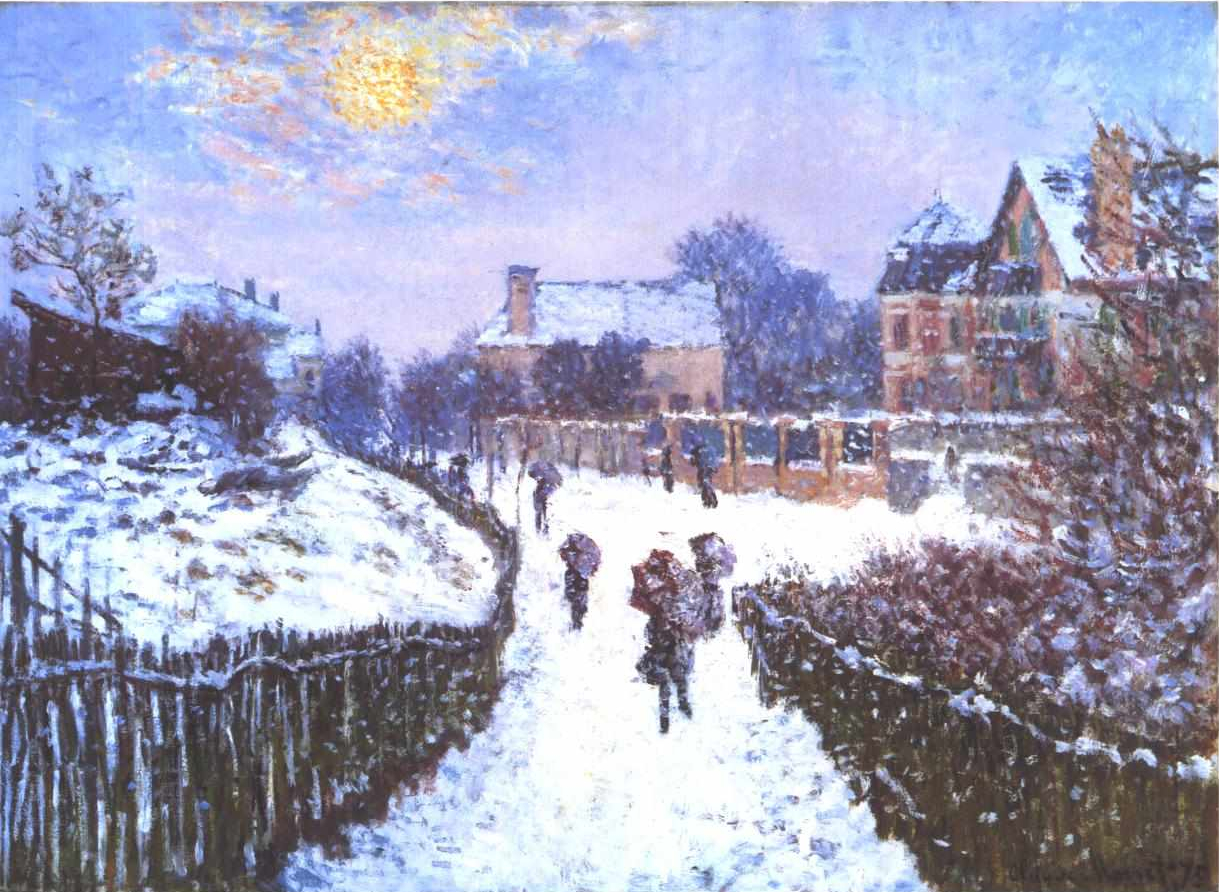
Monet: Boulevard Saint Denis (1875)

The Impressionists were the first artists who made plein-air painting a major genre. They painted outdoors and were interested in real-life subject matter. Their most evident preoccupation and interest was capturing the effect of light and weather at a particular moment – they often painted the same theme all over again in different light and different weather. The Impressionists were influenced in many of their subjects by Japanese woodblock prints. The themes of falling snow and figures with umbrellas in snow are frequent subjects in the ukiyo-e Japanese woodblock prints.

It is possible that a series of severe winters in France also contributed to an increase in the number of winter landscapes produced by Impressionists. Impressionist painters like Claude Monet, Alfred Sisley and Camille Pissarro started painting large numbers of winter landscapes in which they experimented with the use of light and color to paint what they called the effets de neige (the effects of snow). Other painters who painted winter landscapes but less frequently were Pierre-Auguste Renoir, Gustave Caillebotte and Paul Gauguin. The French master Claude Monet's first painting in his winter series of 140 paintings was A Cart on the Snowy Road at Honfleur, which was followed by many other winter landscapes, including a long series with haystacks. In the painting Boulevard Saint Denis, Monet sought to catch the moment when the sun was hidden behind the clouds during a light snowfall. In The Magpie, Monet's largest and probably most widely known winter painting, he used blue-gray colors to depict shadows in the snow.

The Impressionists in Winter was an exhibition organized around the theme Effets de Neige.

Impressionist works

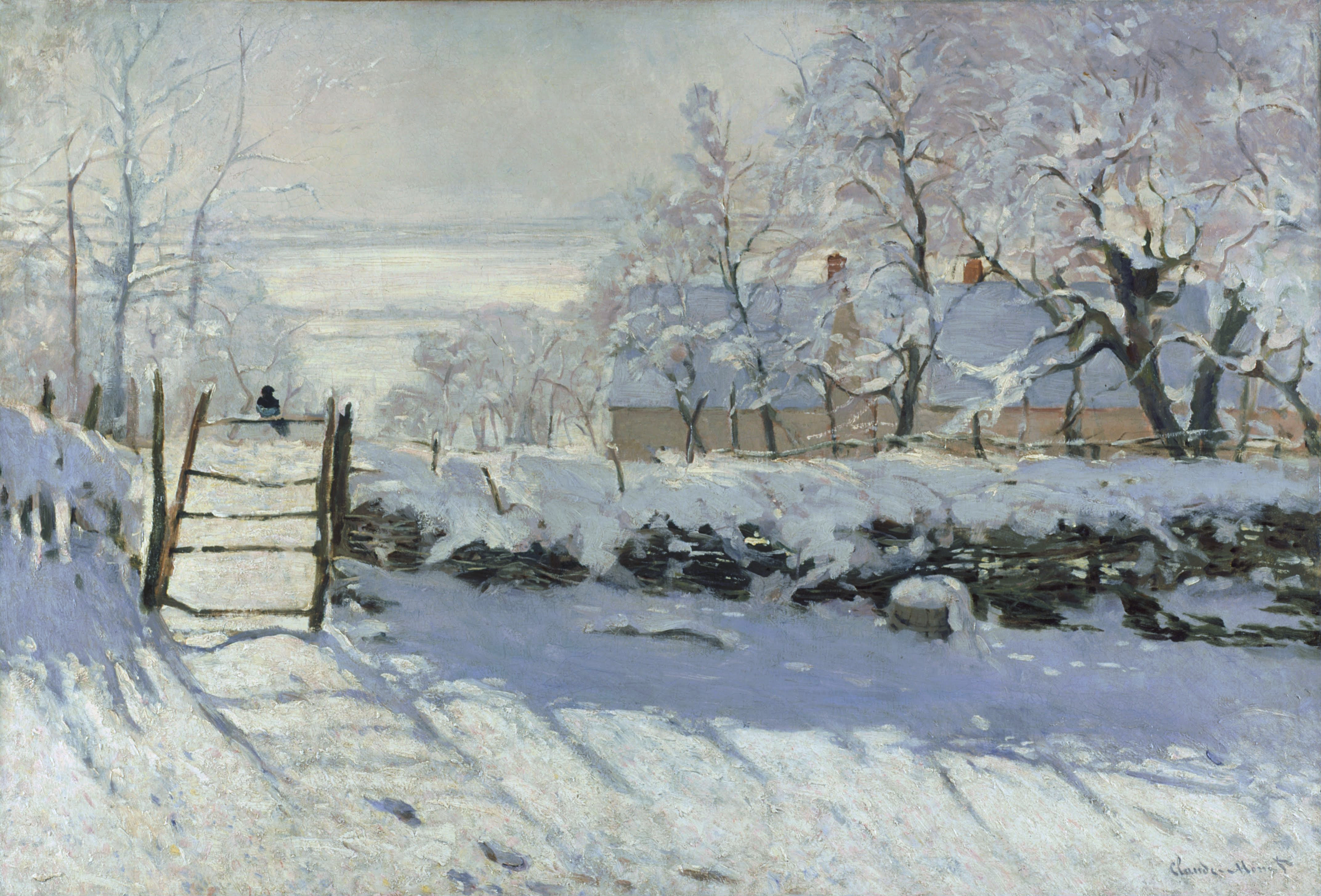
Monet: The Magpie (1869)

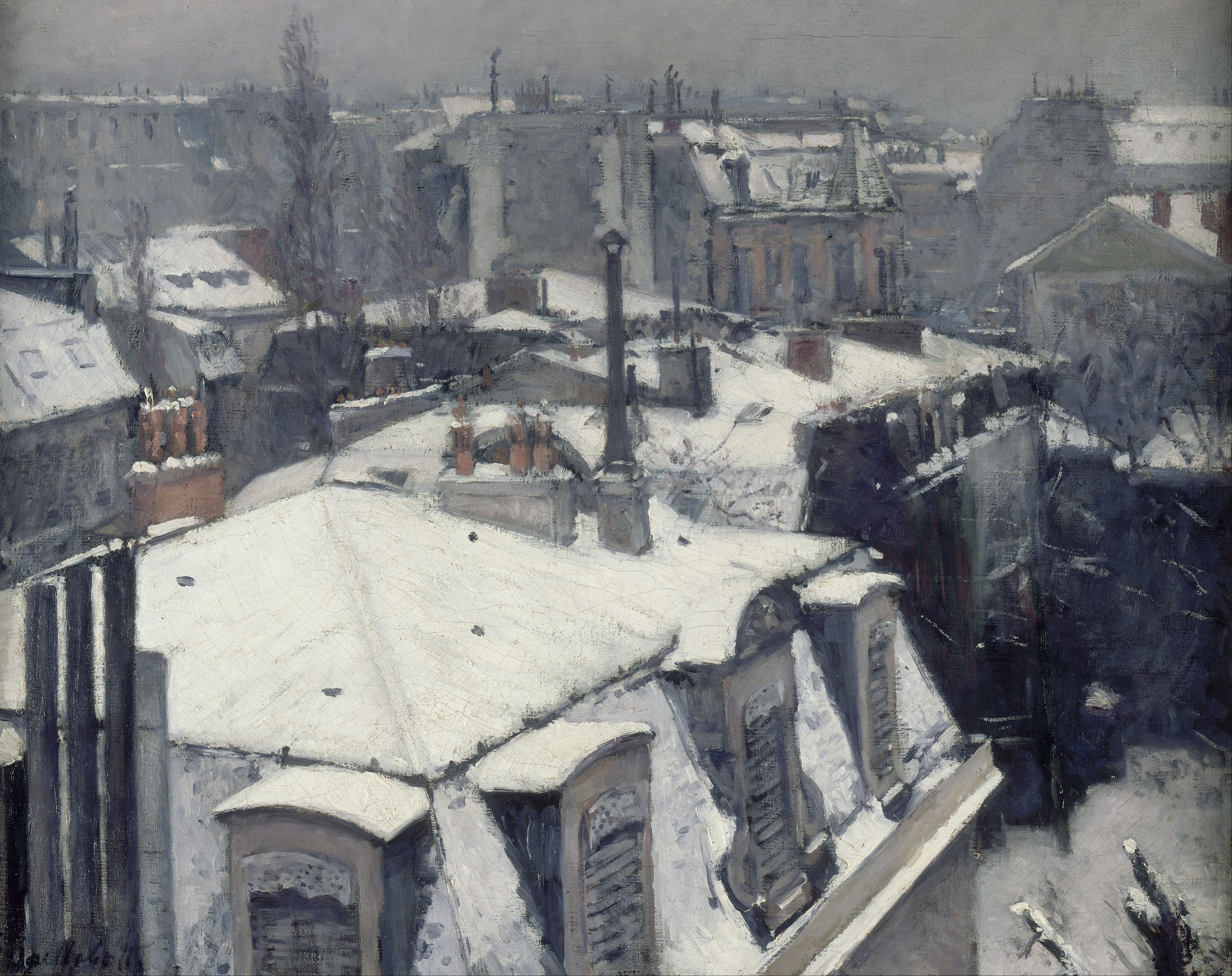
Caillebotte: Vue de toits (Effet de neige) (Rooftops (snow effect)) (1875)

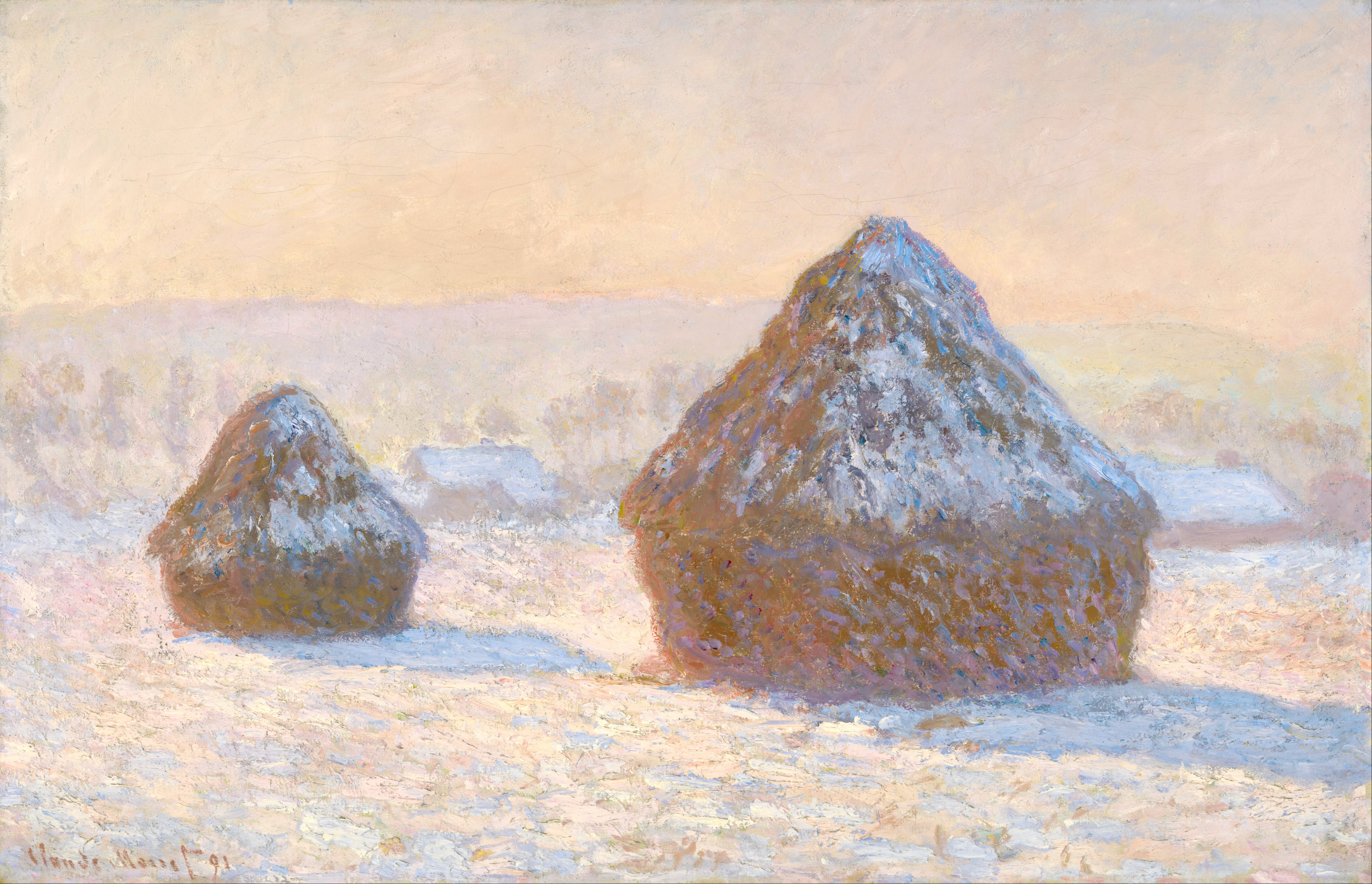
Monet: Wheatstacks, Snow Effect, Morning

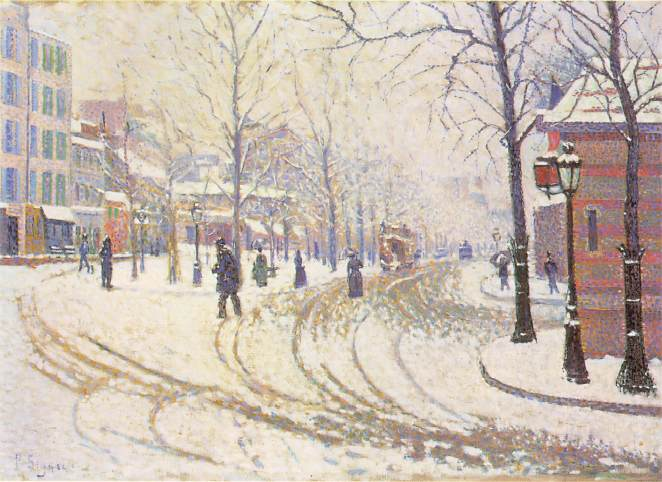
Signac: Boulevard de Clichy (1886)

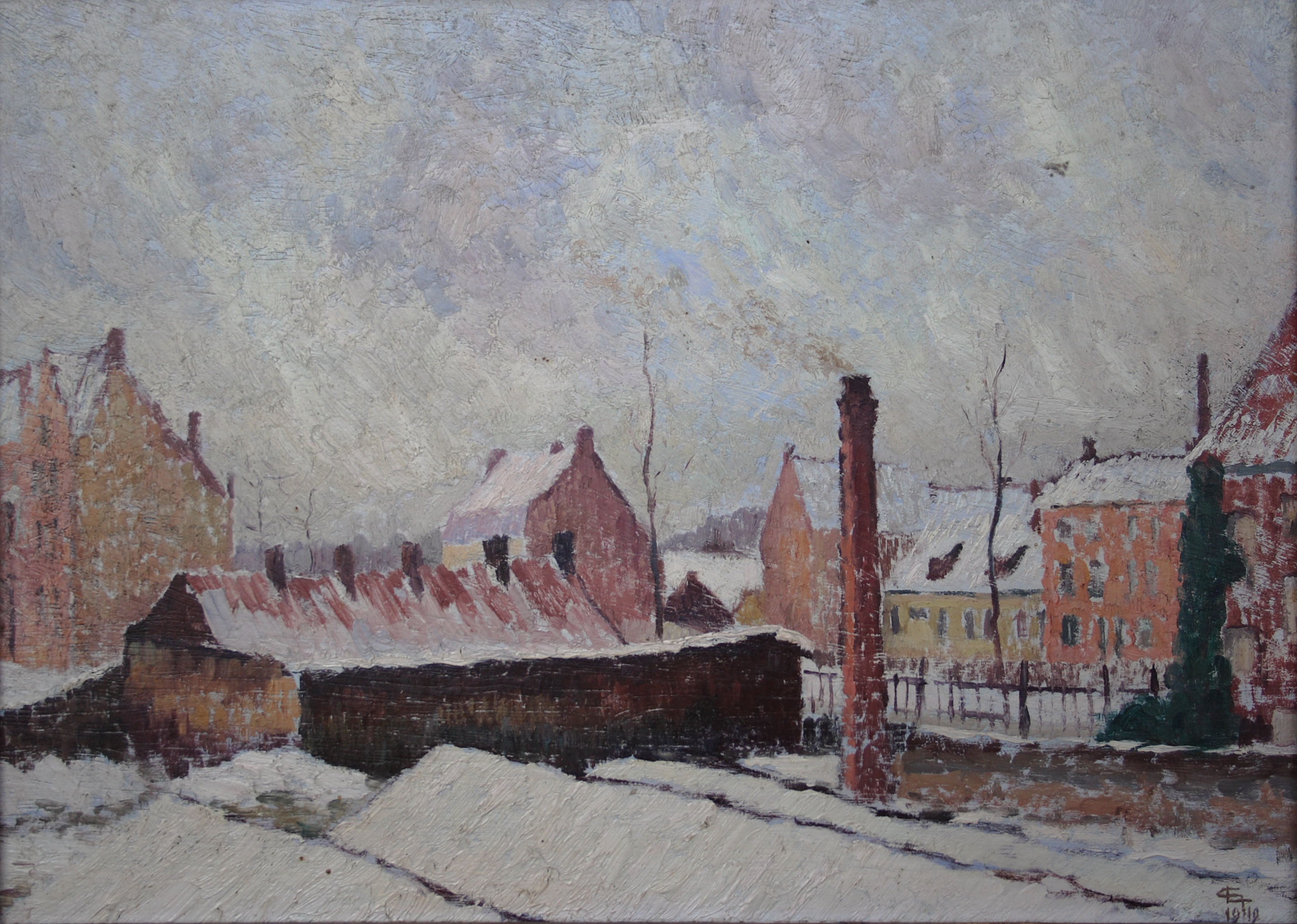
Lebacq: Snow at Bruges (1910)

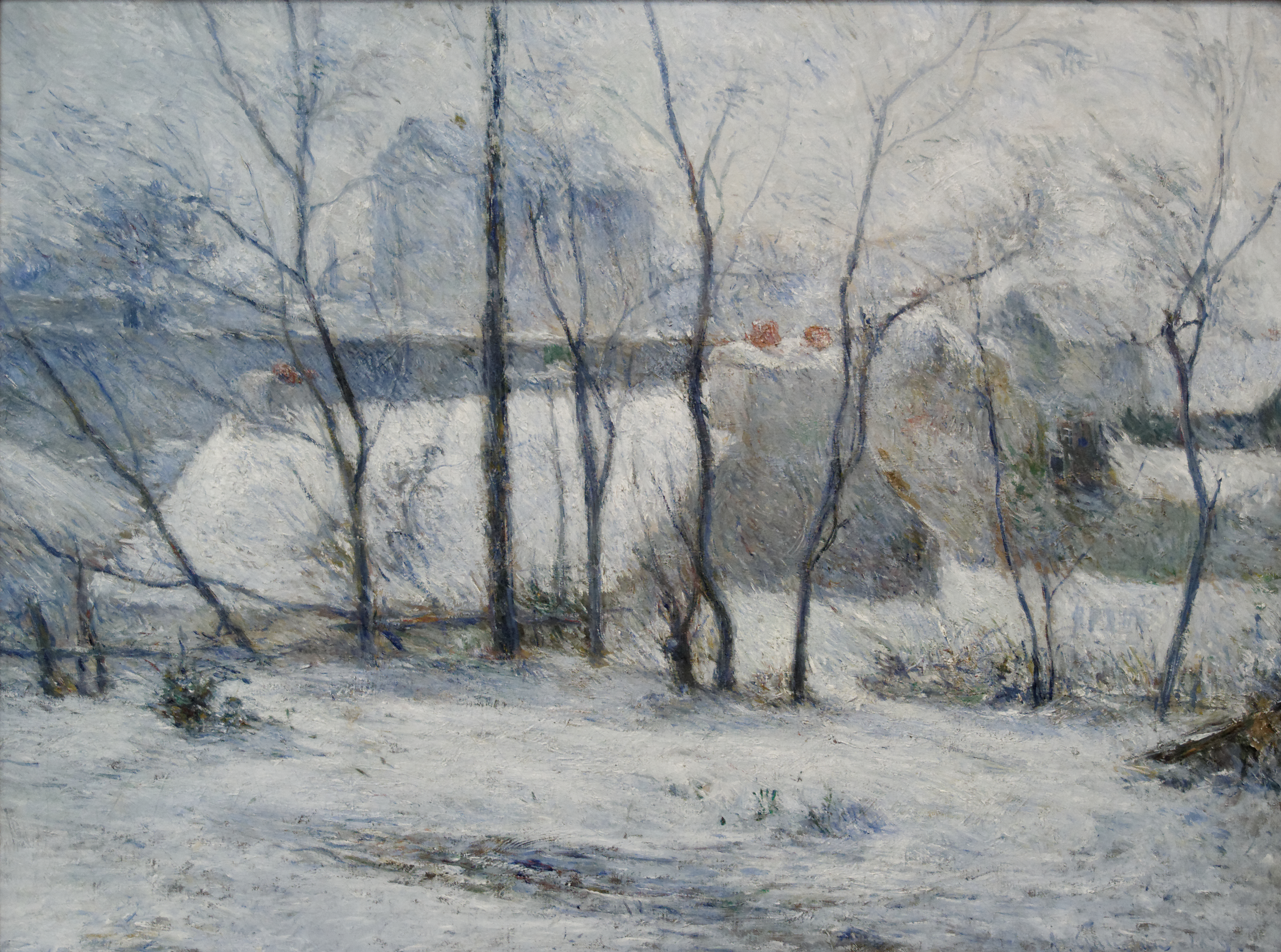
Gauguin: Winter Landscape (1879)

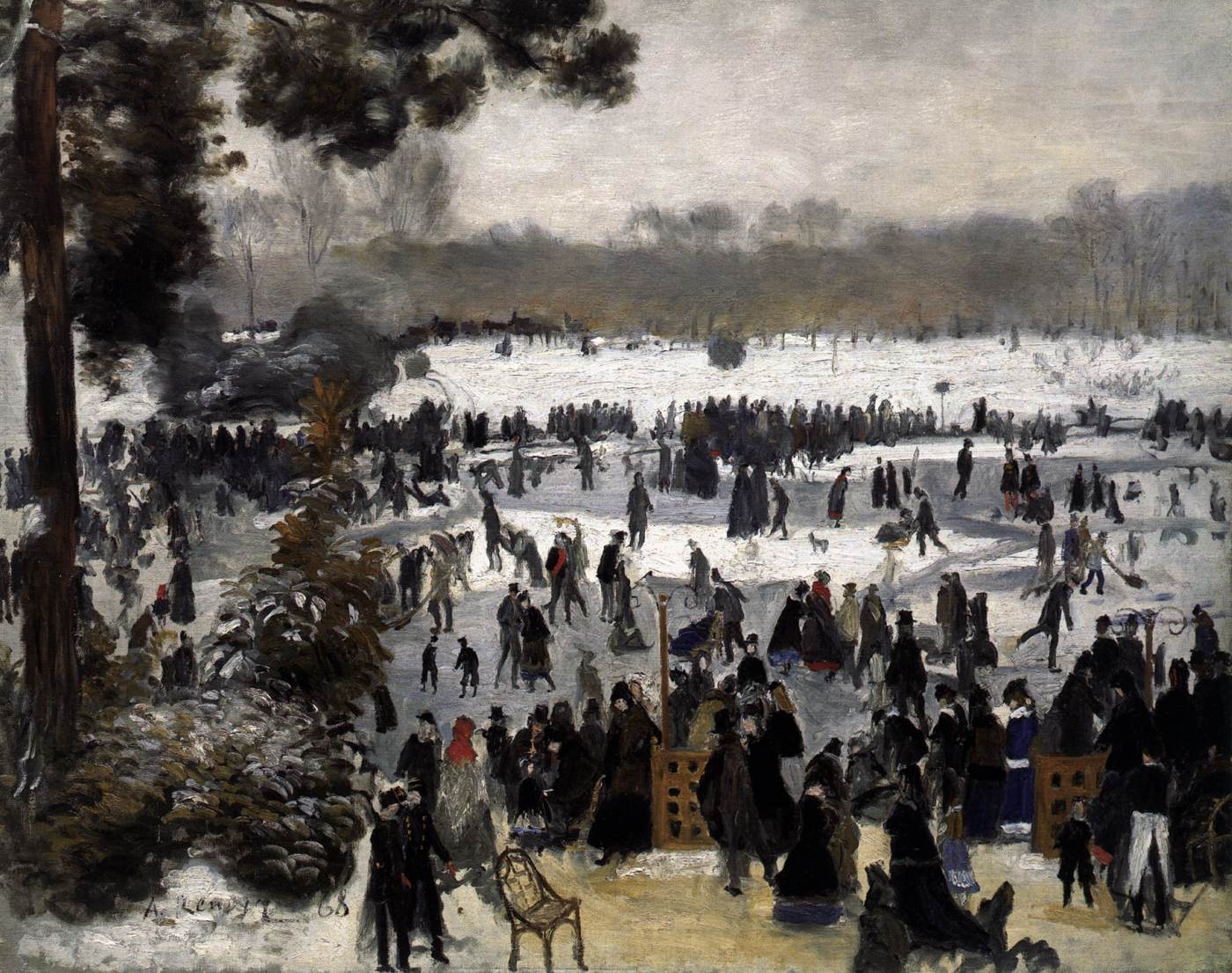
Renoir: Skaters in the Bois de Boulogne (1868)

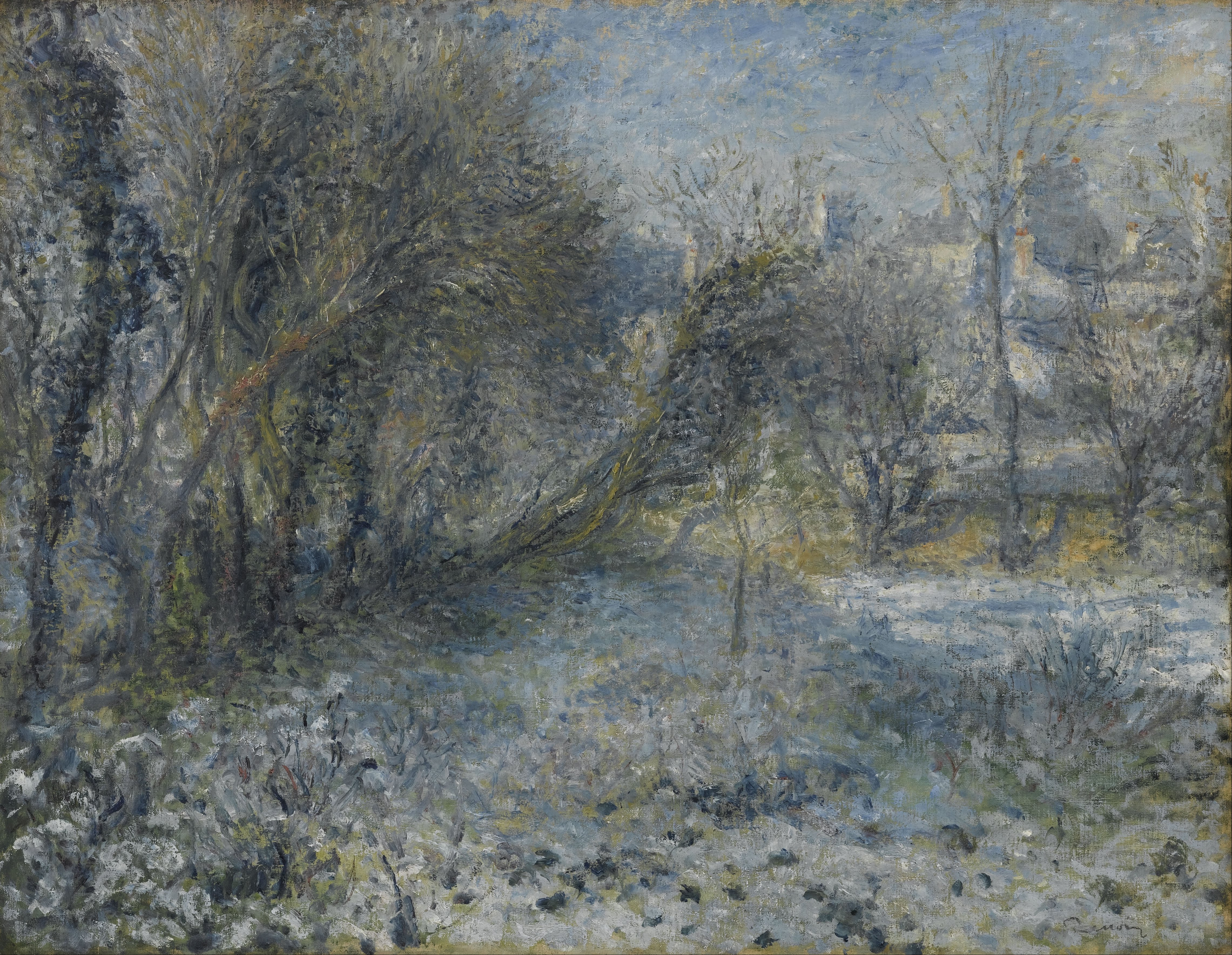
Renoir: Snowy Landscape (1870-1875)

==== Technique ====
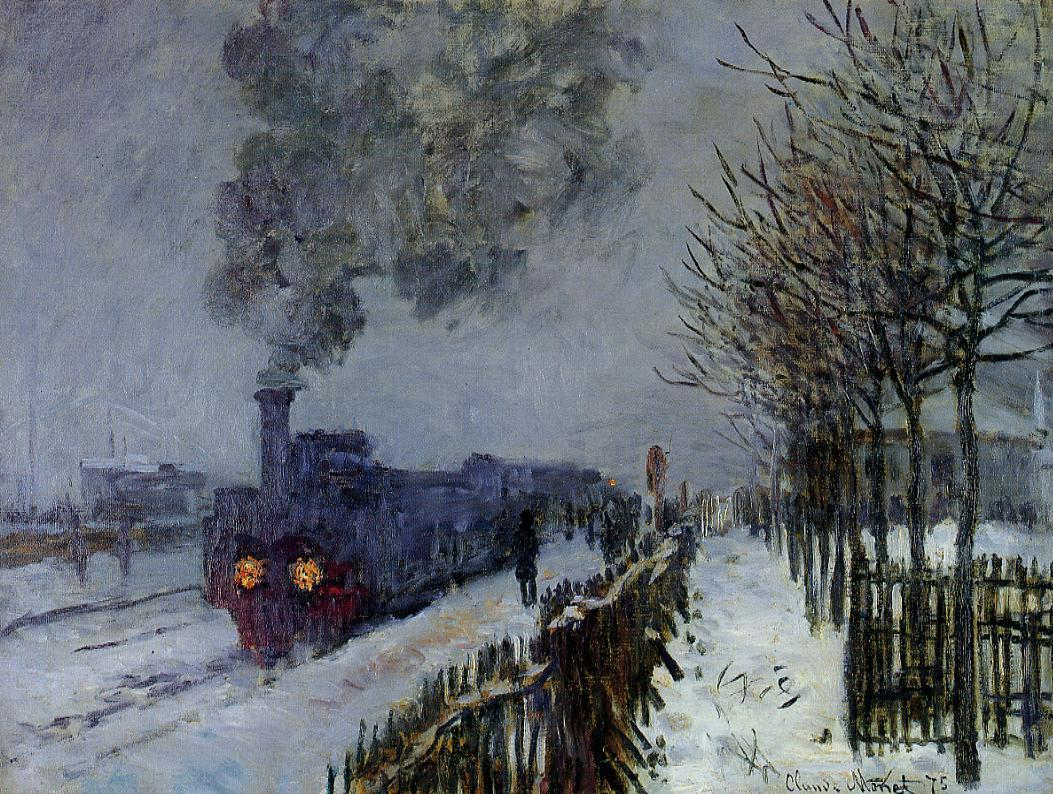
Monet: Train in the Snow (1875)

It was the natural outdoor light that made the Impressionist's treatment of subjects different. They closely observed the various colors of light that were reflected from objects and captured those colors in their paintings. Since Impressionists painted in plein air, the shadows reflected the light of the sky as it was reflected onto surfaces.

Impressionists generally used vivid colors, with often thick application of paint, and real-life subject matter. The new technology of premixed paints in tin tubes aided the development of this style. Previously, painters had made their own paints by grinding and mixing dry pigment powders with linseed oil. In the 1860s, many vivid synthetic pigments became commercially available such as cobalt blue, viridian, cadmium yellow and synthetic ultramarine blue, as well as even newer colors such as cerulean blue. As a result, the Impressionists soon moved toward a brighter style of painting. By the 1870s, Monet, Renoir, and Pissarro usually chose to paint on grounds of a light grey or beige colour, but some of the Impressionists had come to prefer white grounds.

== Gallery ==
Winter landscapes

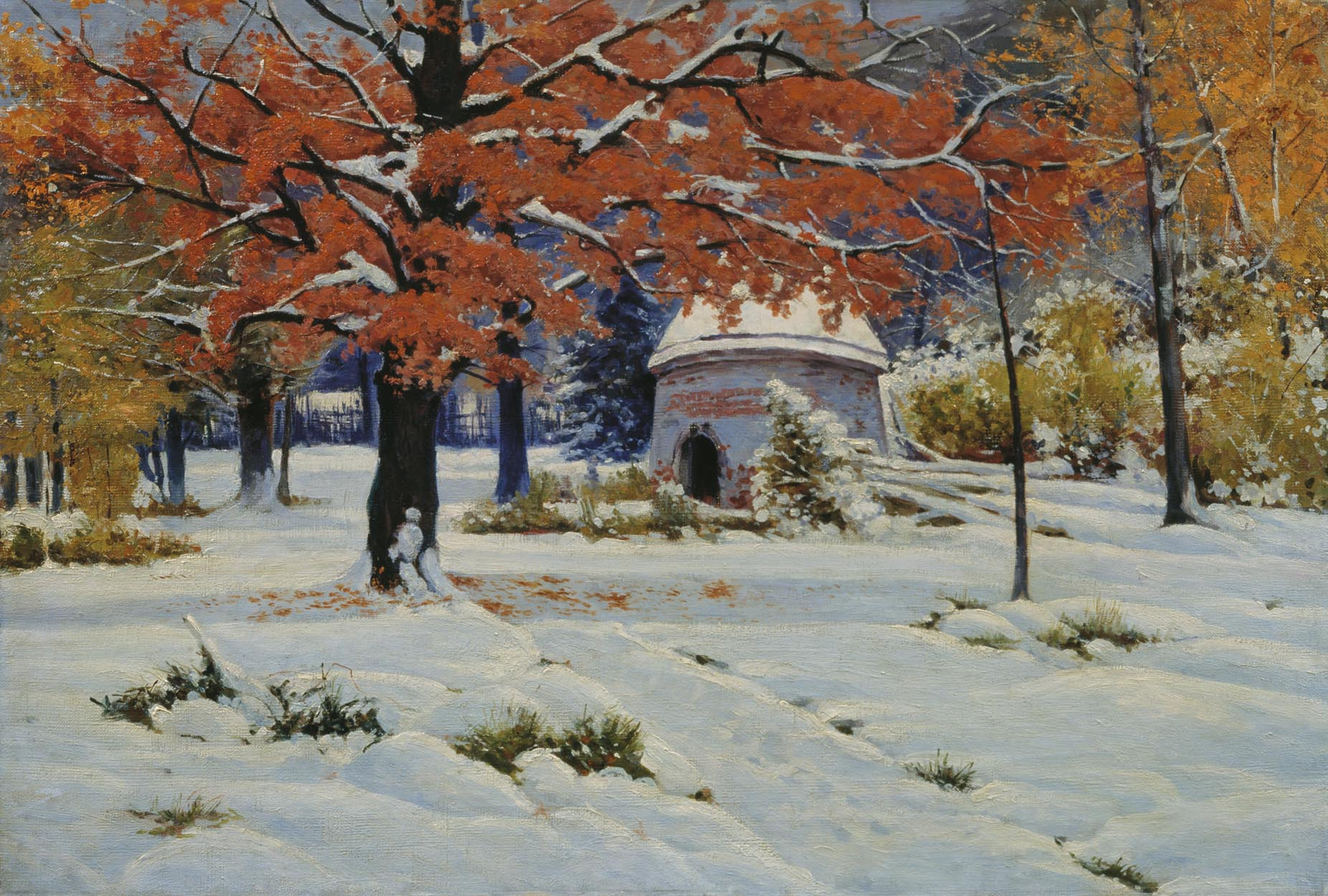
Konstantin Kryzhitsky: Early Snow

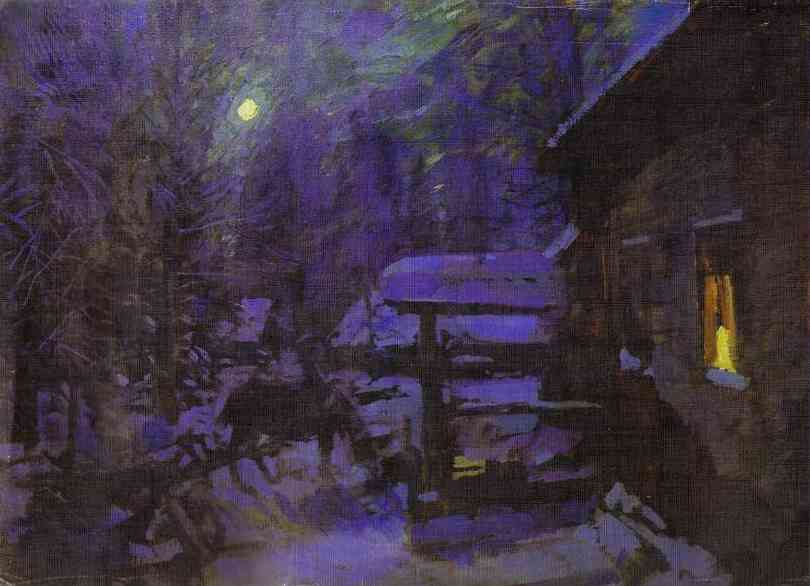
Korovin: Moonlit Night, Winter (1913)

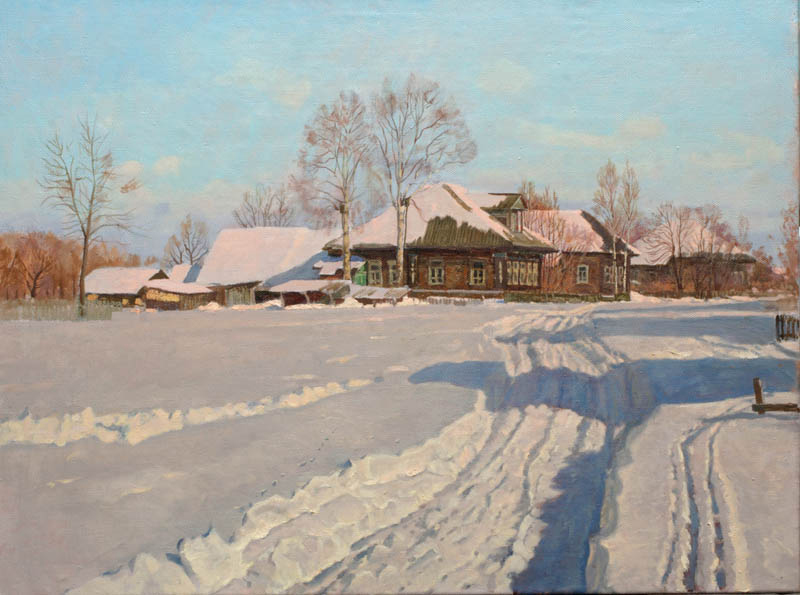
Anokhin: The Village (2006)

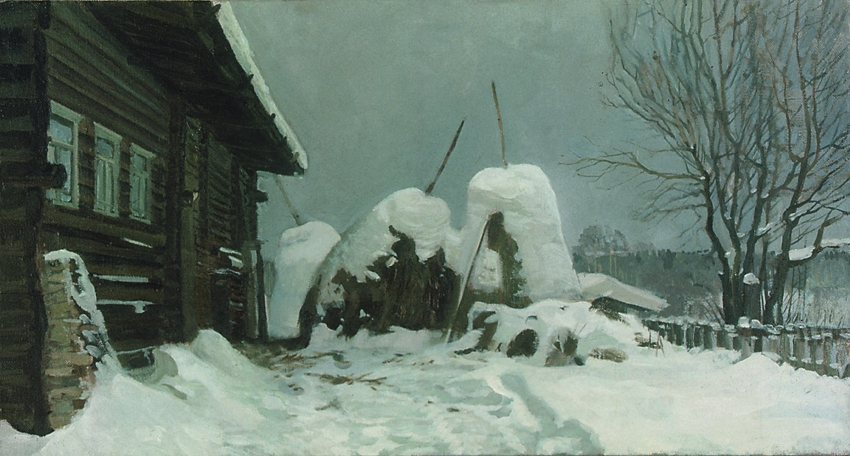
Anokhin: The Thaw (1991)

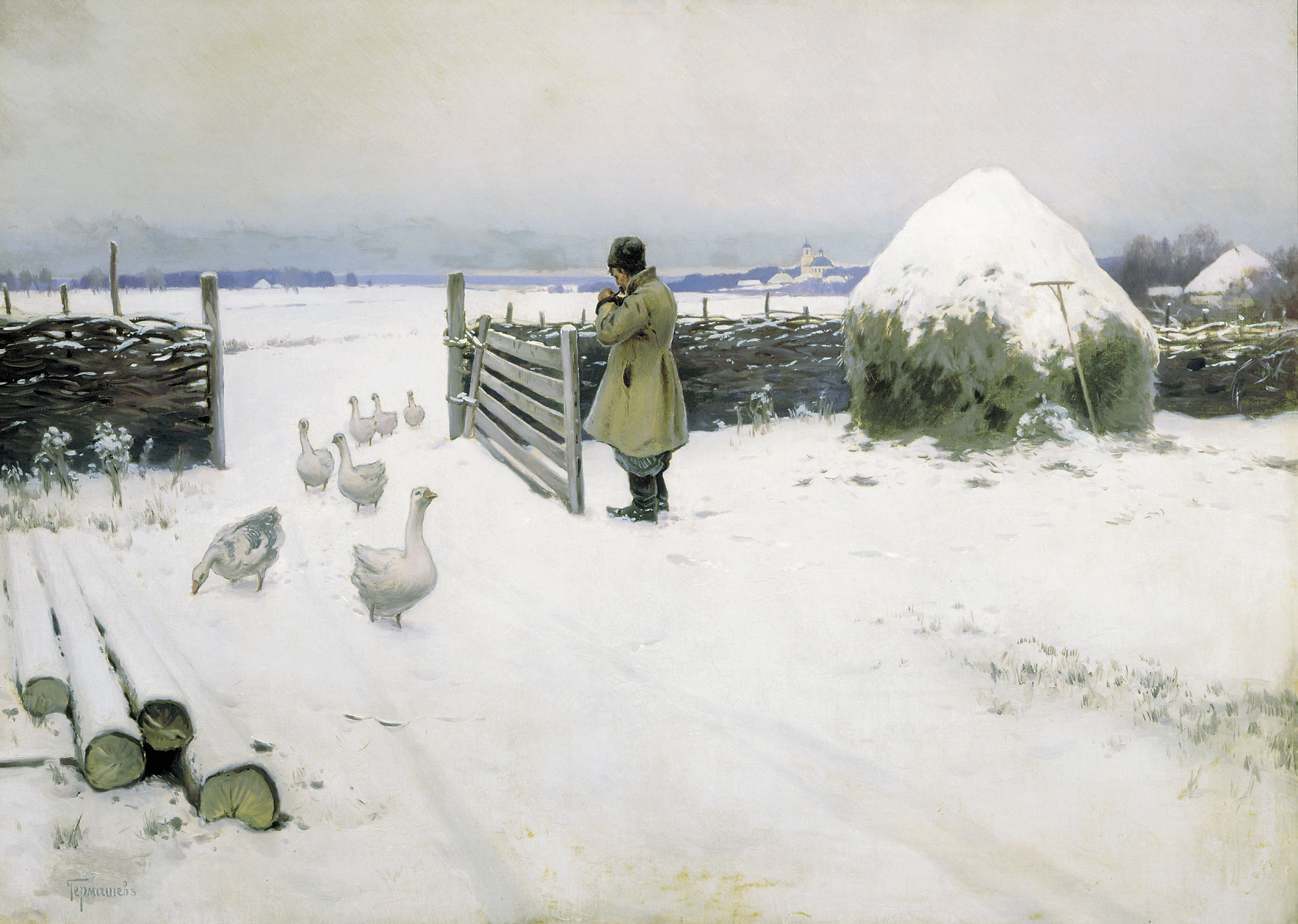
Mikhail Germashev: Snow (1897)

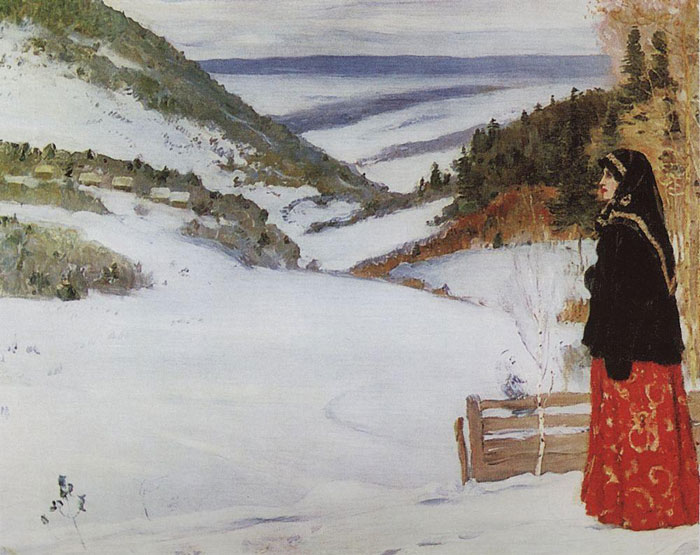
Mikhail Nesterov: Winter in Skite (1904)

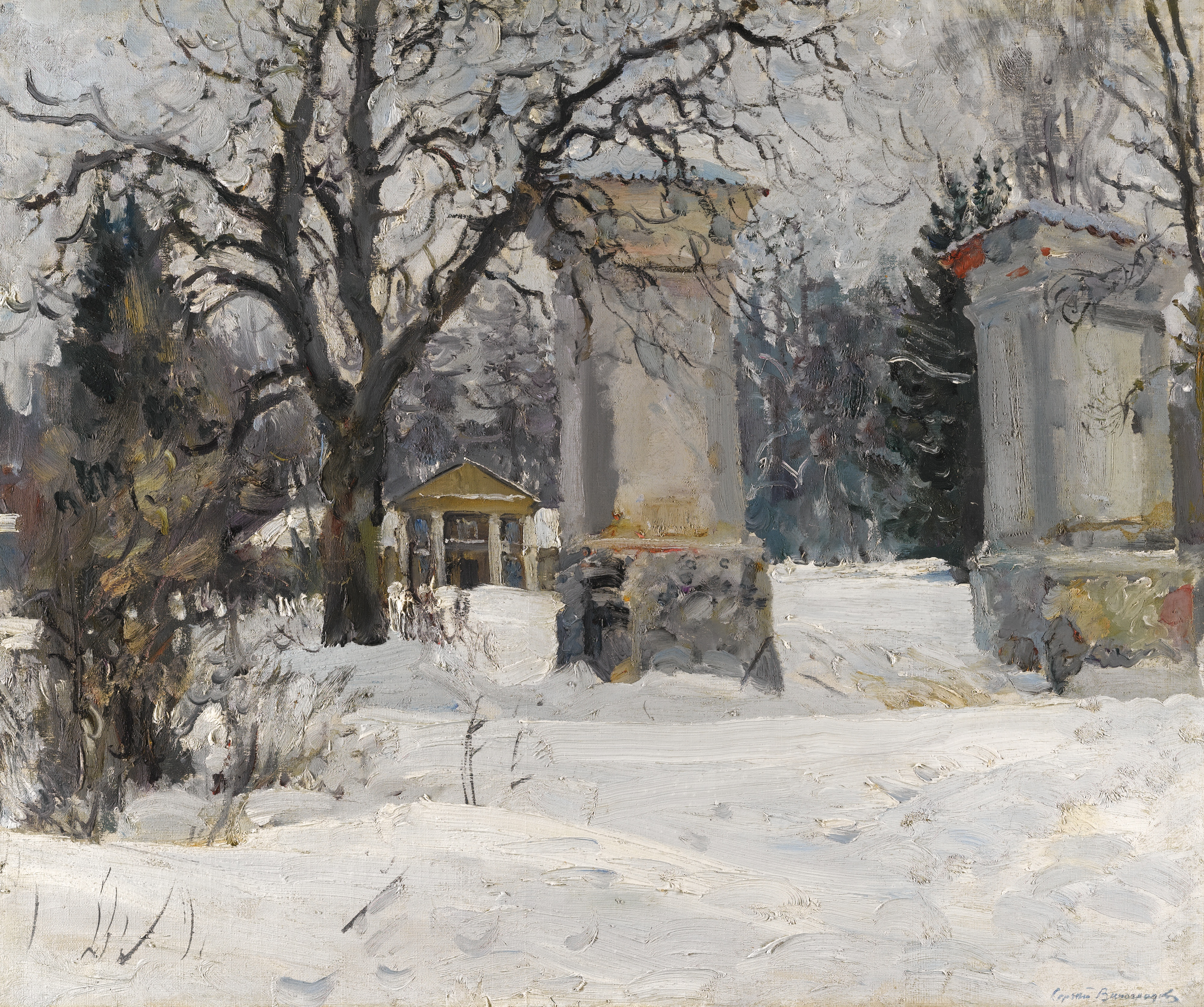
Sergei Vinogradov: Entrance

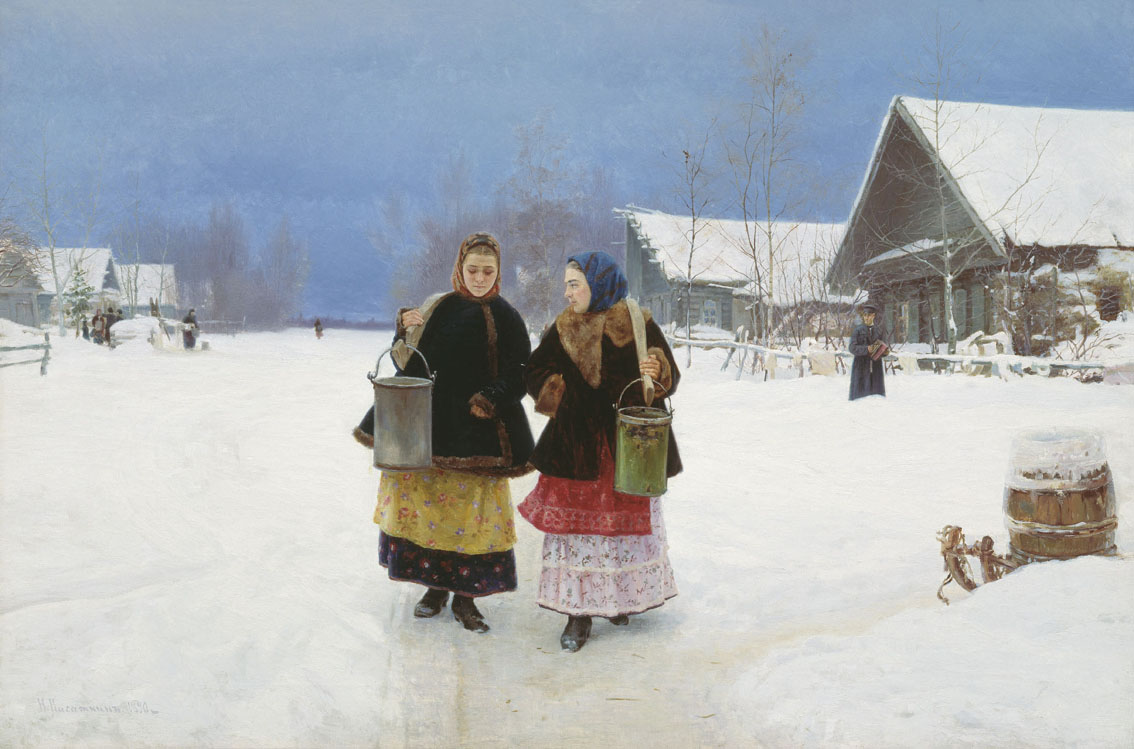
Nikolay Kasatkin: Rival Ladies (1890)

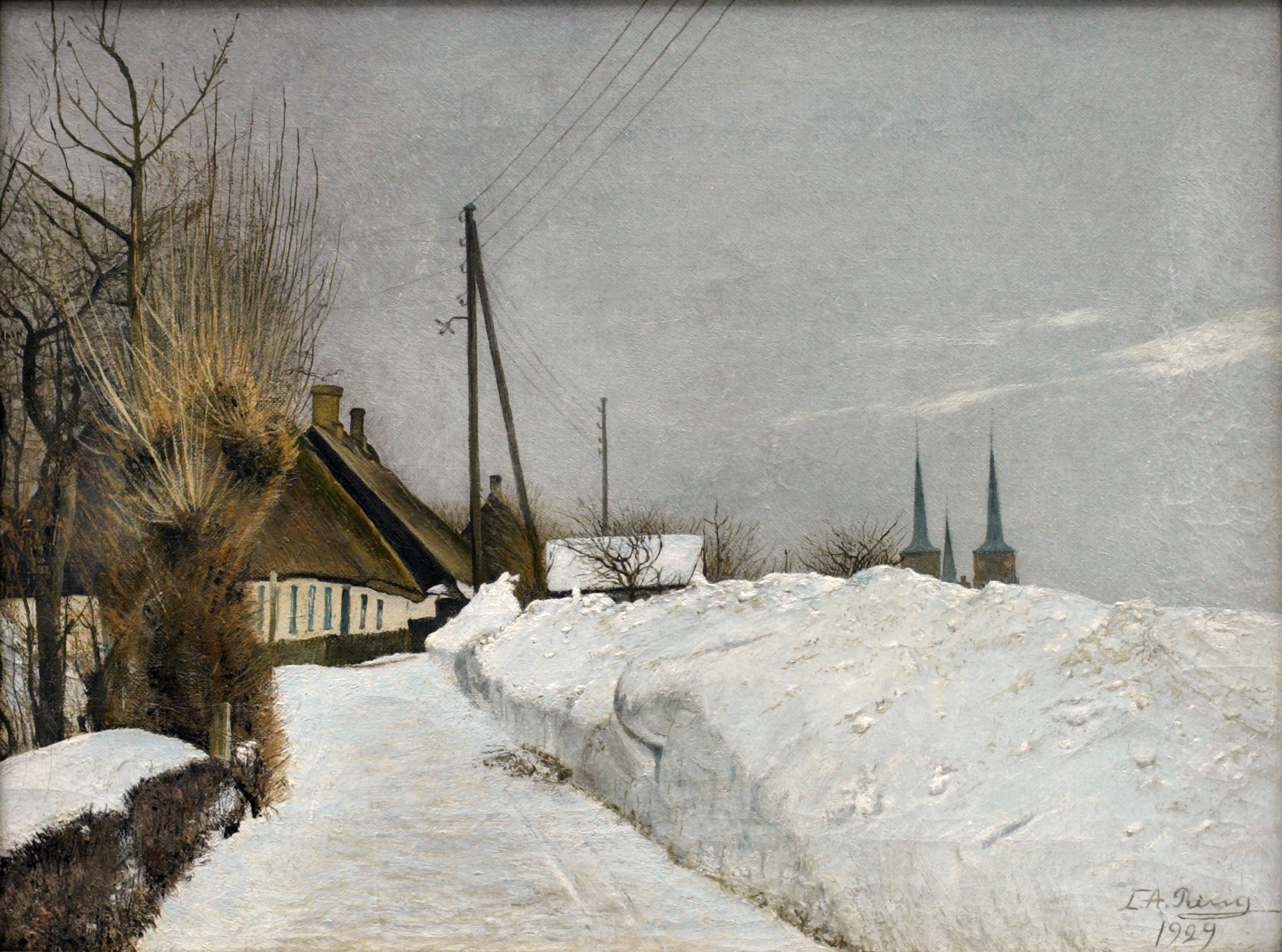
L.A. Ring: Winter Day in Roskilde (1929)

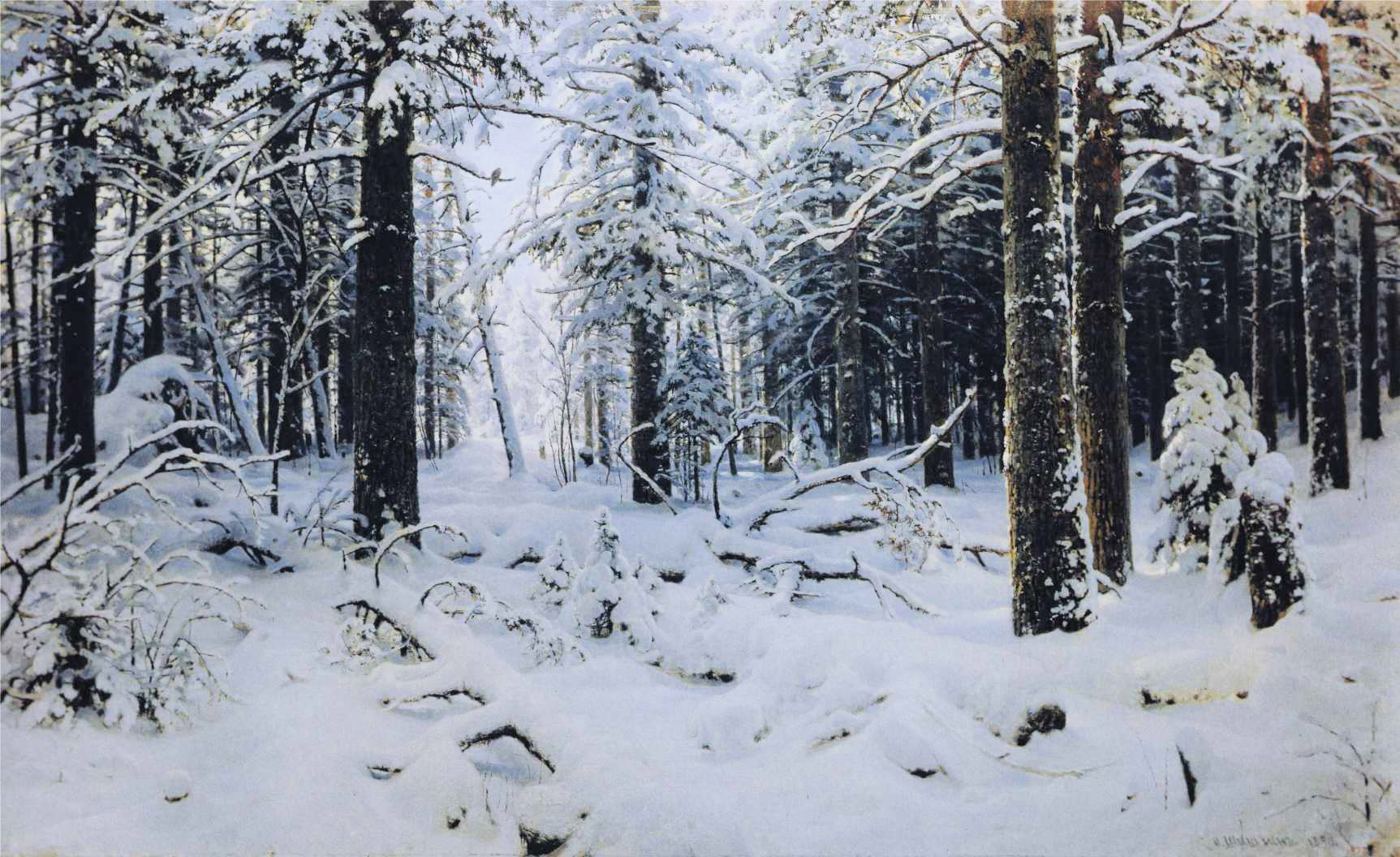
Ivan Shishkin, Winter, (1890)

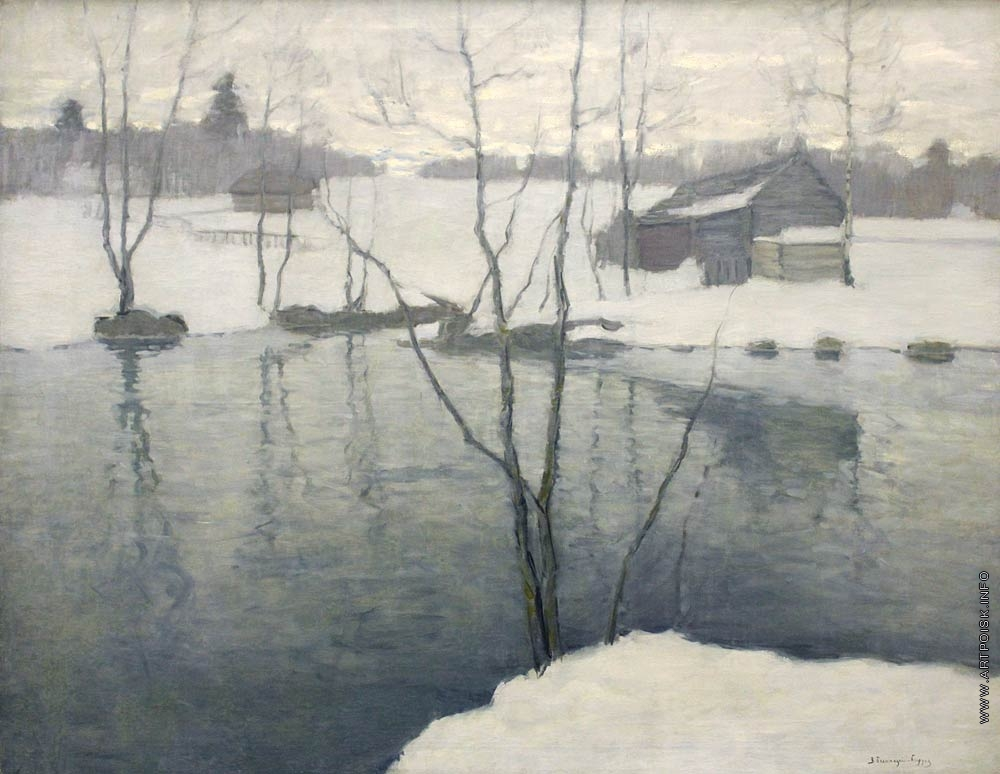
Vitold Byalynitsky-Birulya: Spring is Coming (c. 1910)

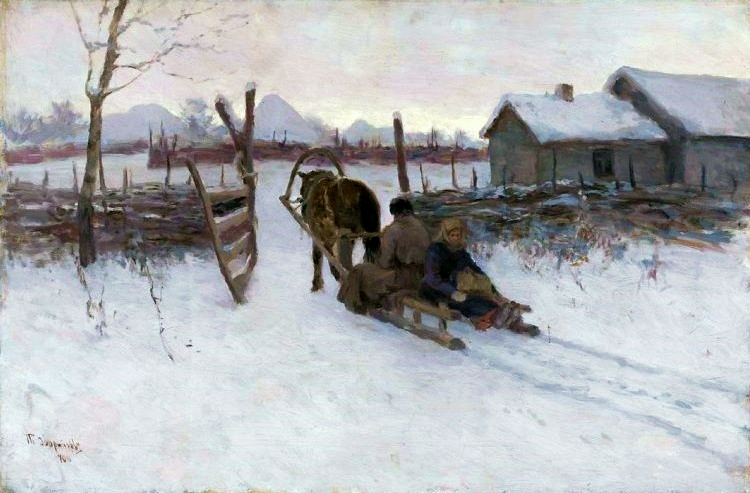
Titus Dvornikov: Farm with Sleigh (1900)

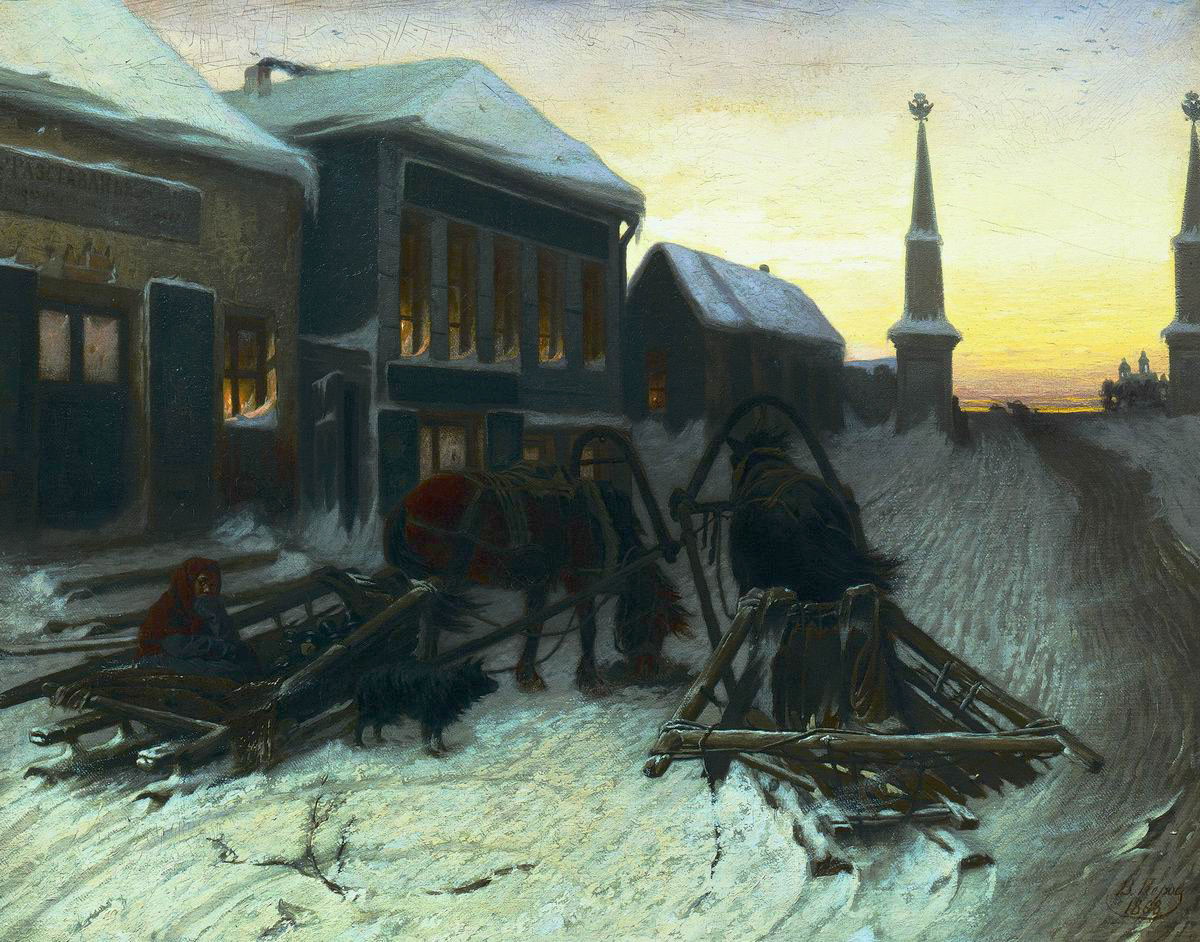
Vasily Perov: Last Tavern at City Gates (1868)

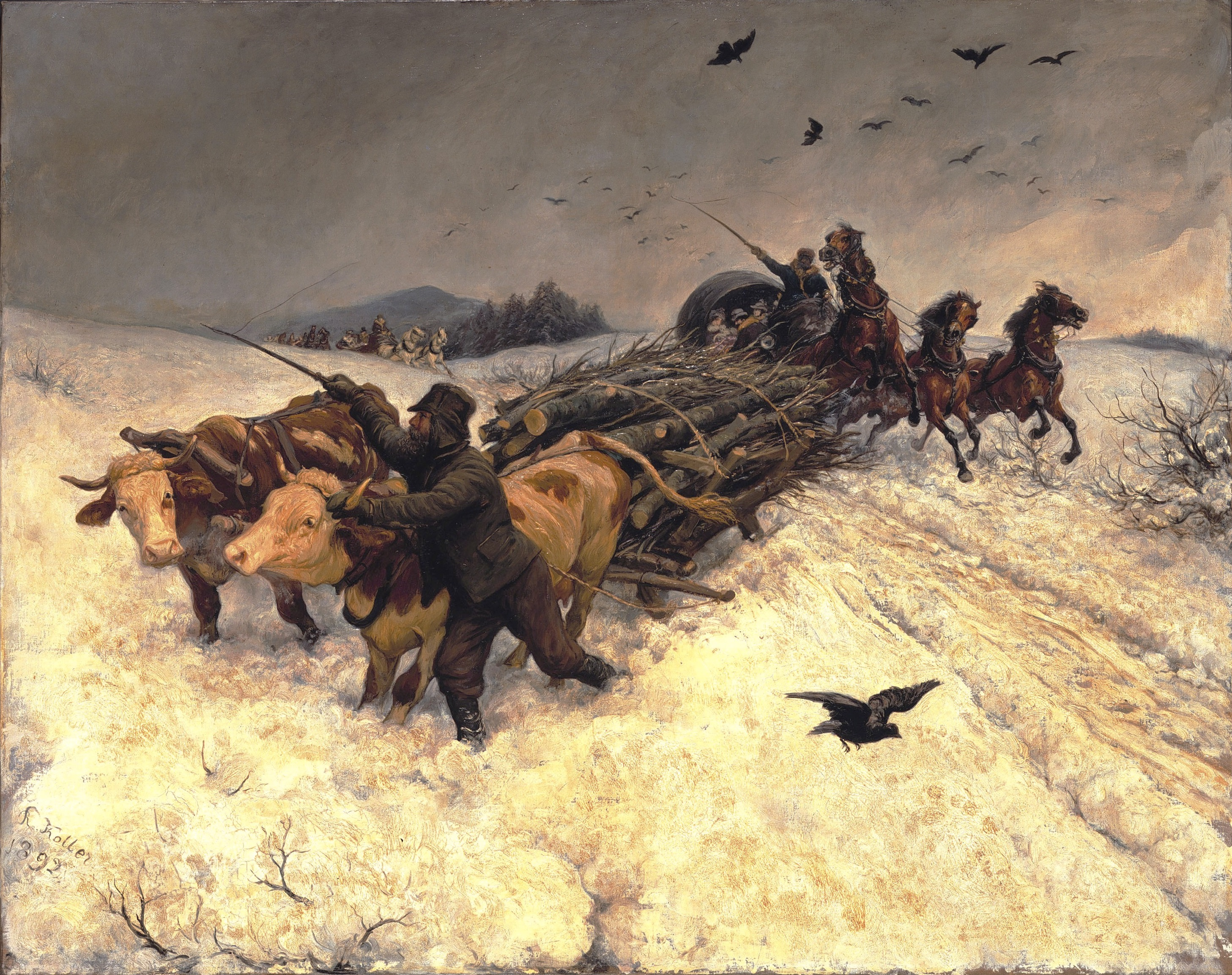
Rudolf Koller: Sleigh Ride (1892)

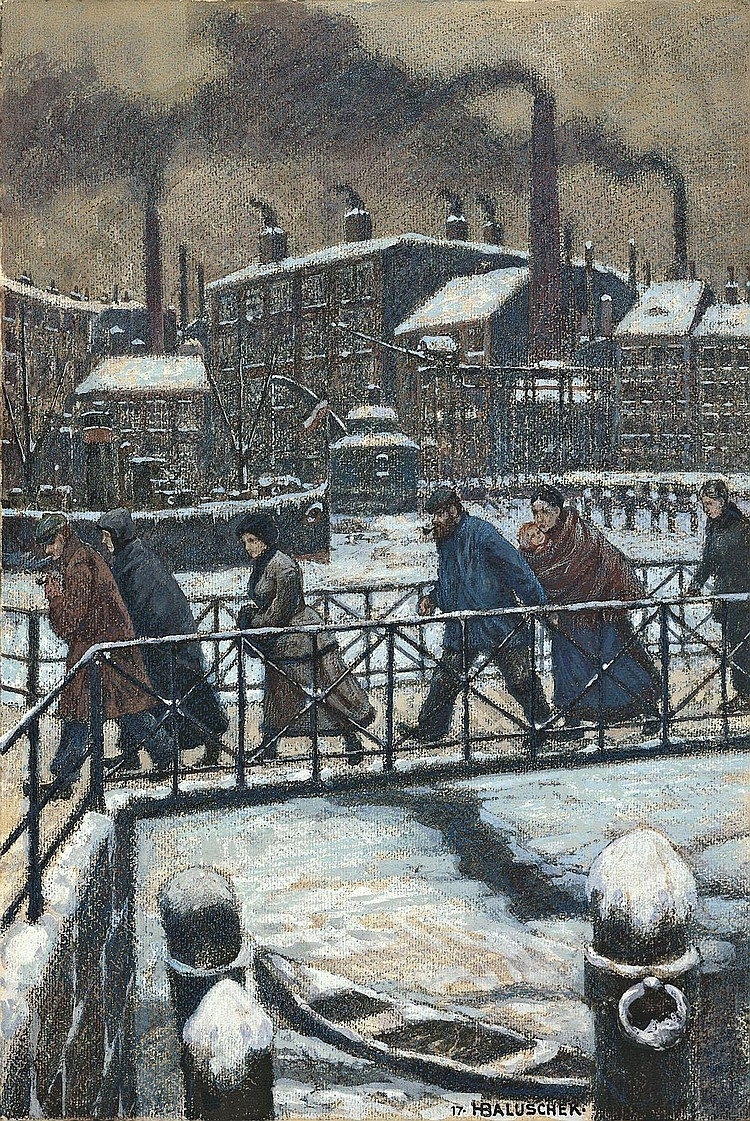
Hans Baluschek: Cold (1917)

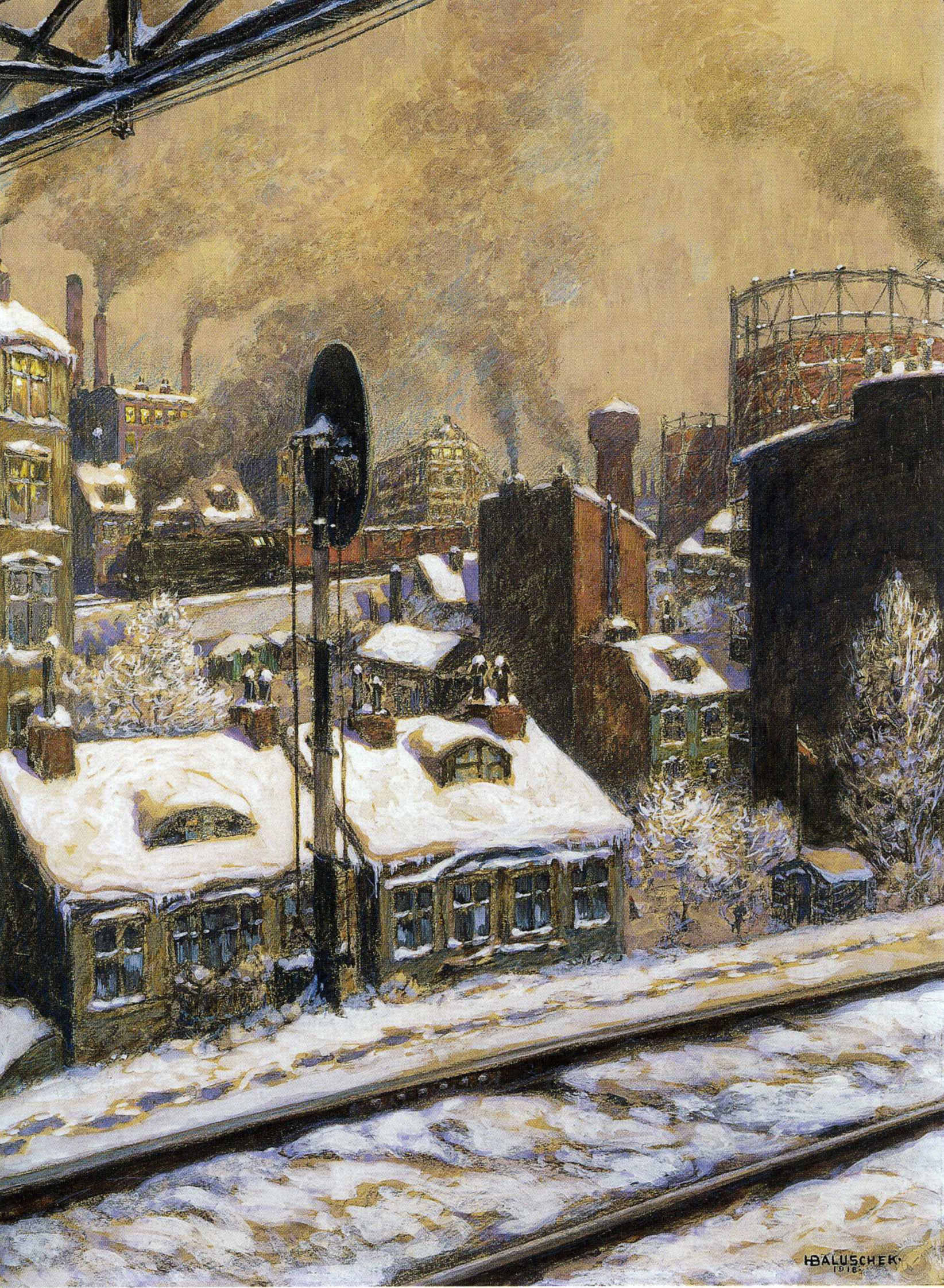
Baluschek: Deep Snow (1918)

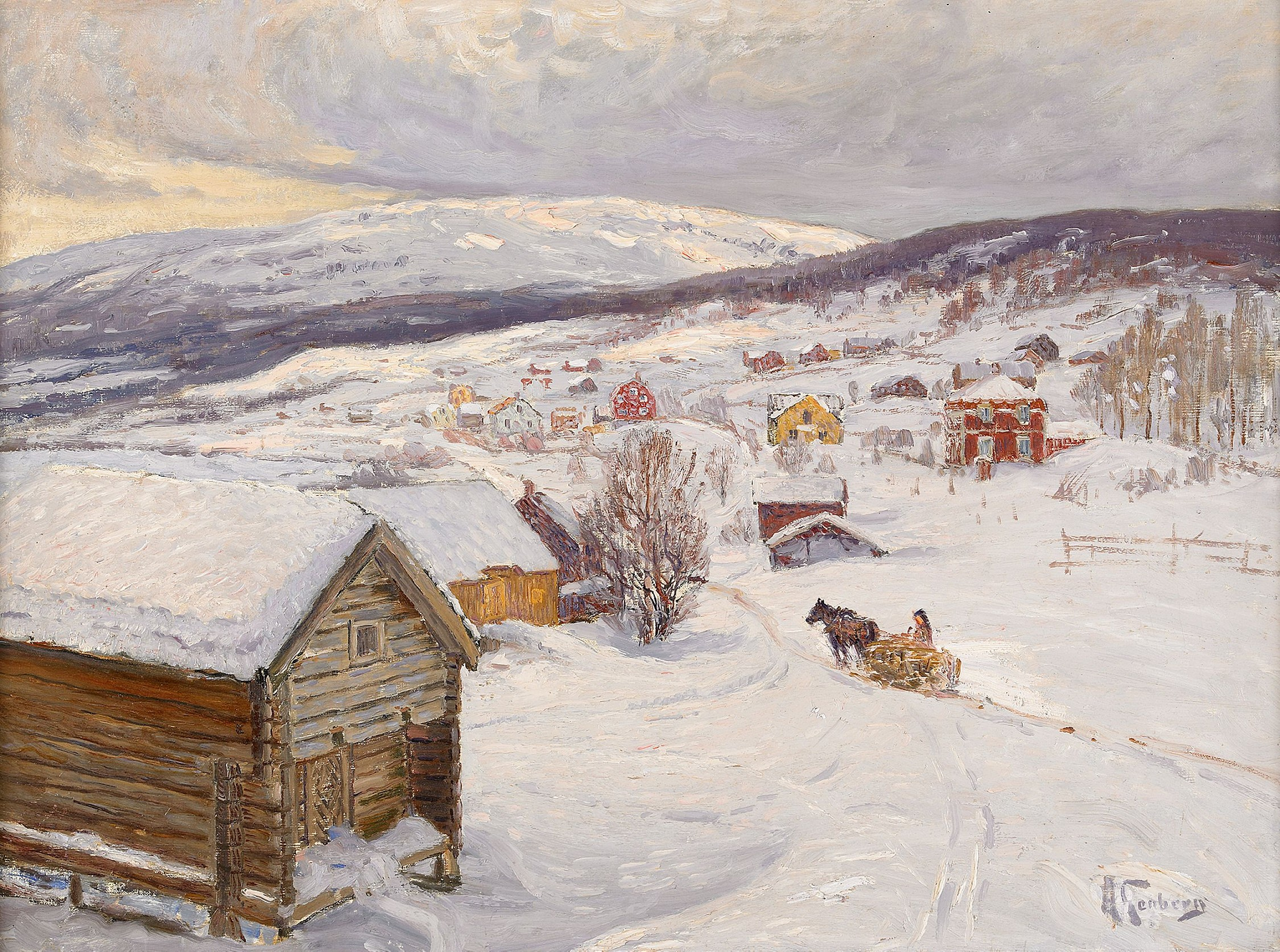
Anton Genberg: Afternoon Mood

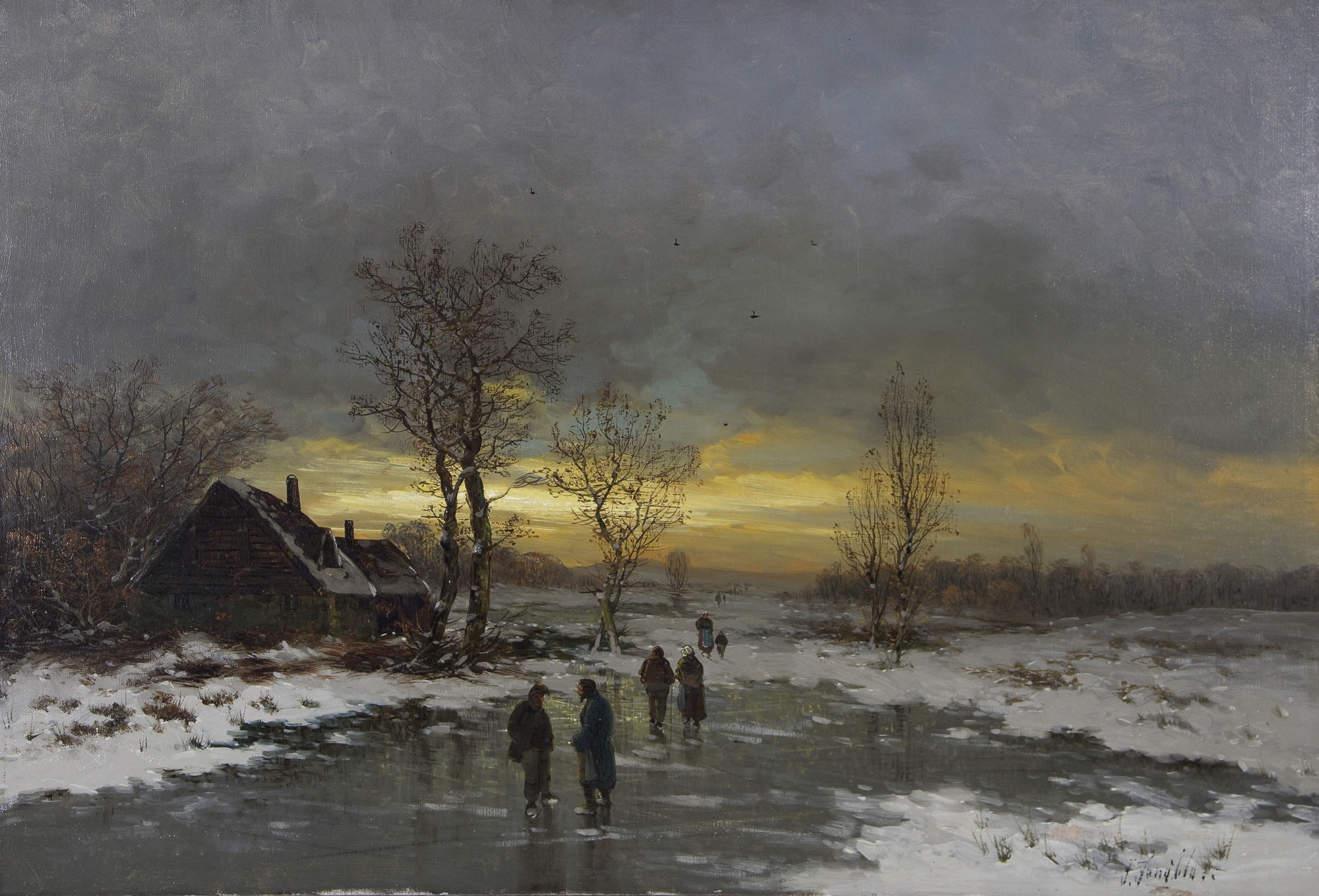
Johann Jungblut: Winter Landscape (1885)

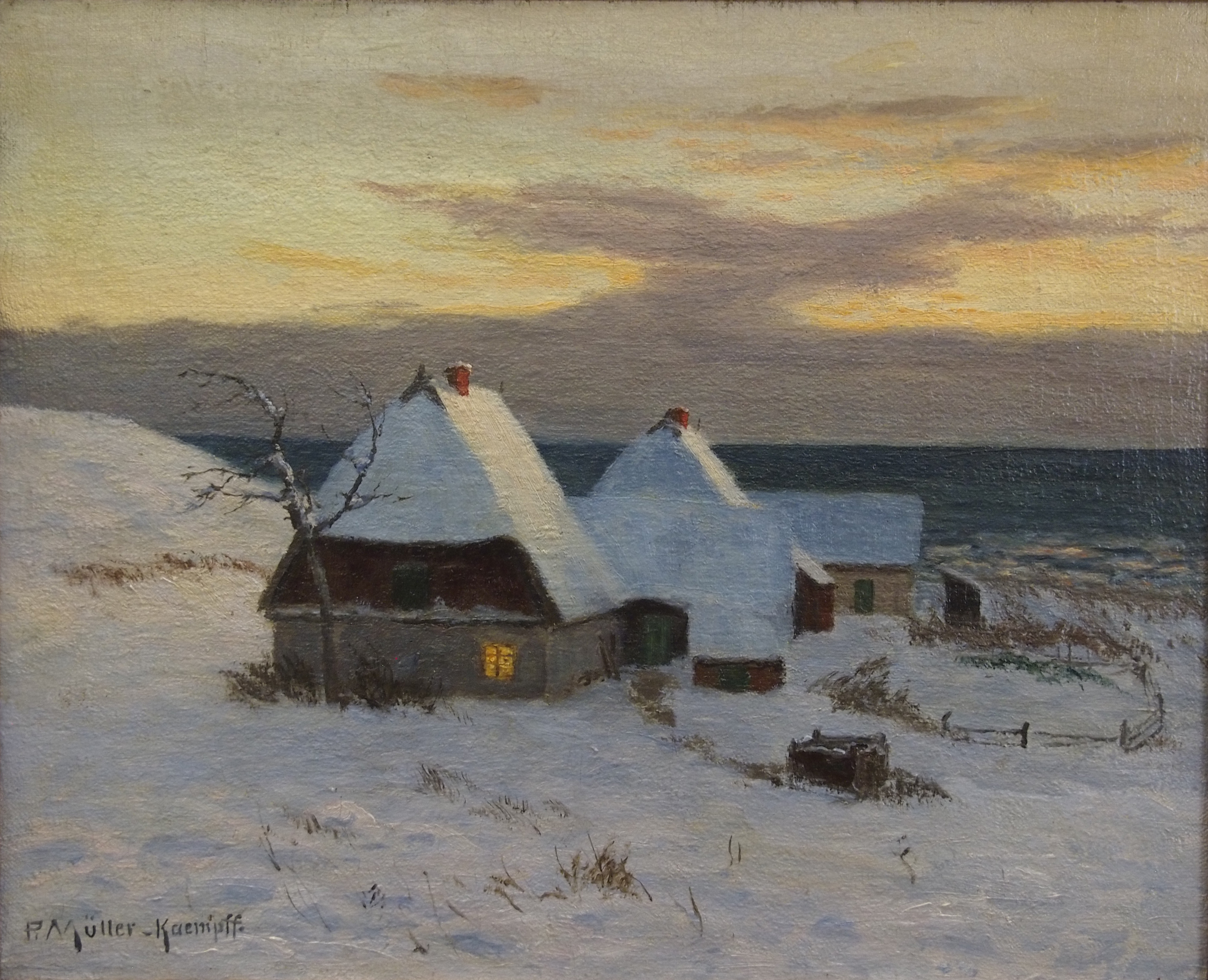
Paul Müller-Kaempff: Winter, Darss Peninsula

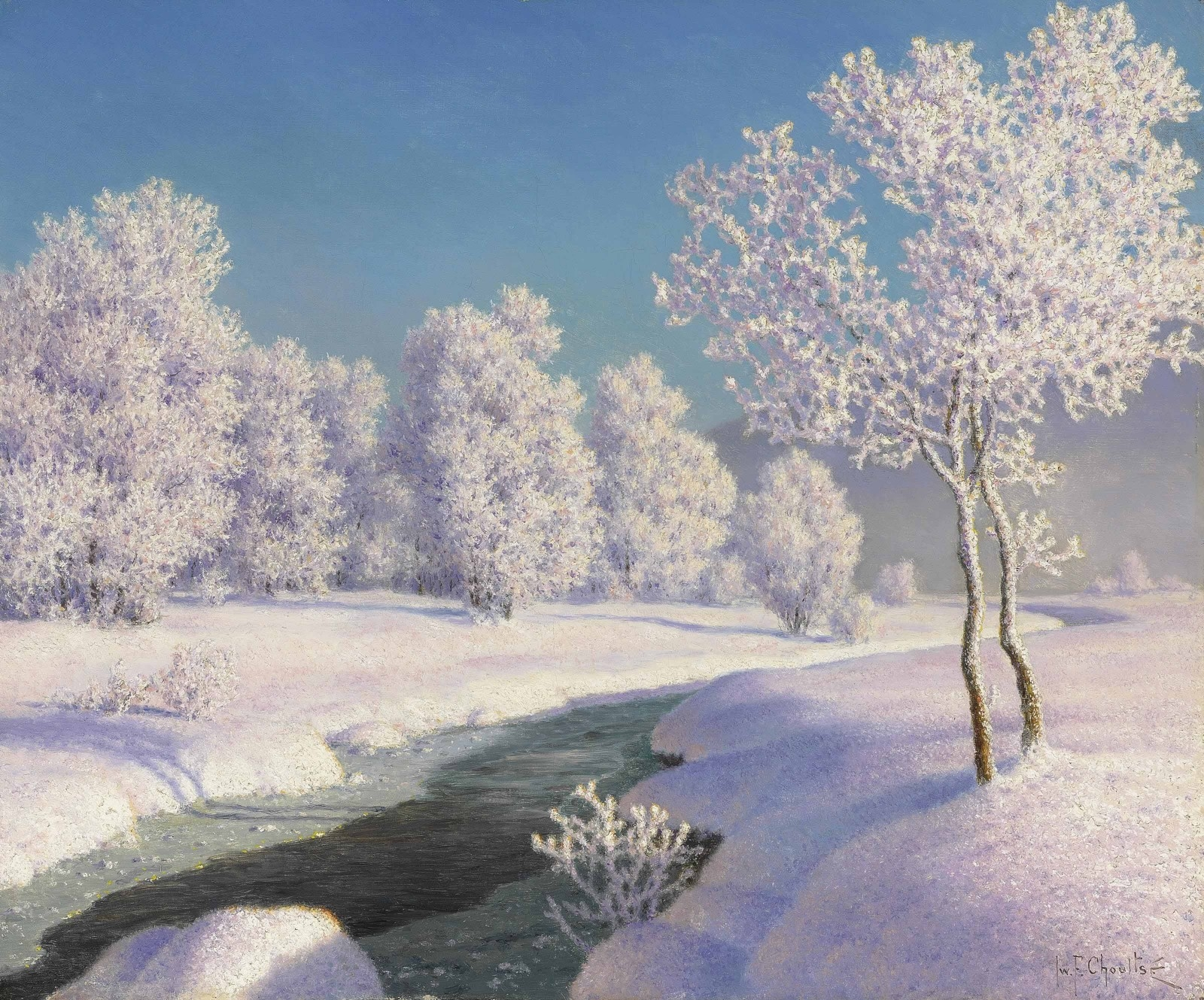
Ivan Choultsé: Winter Morning

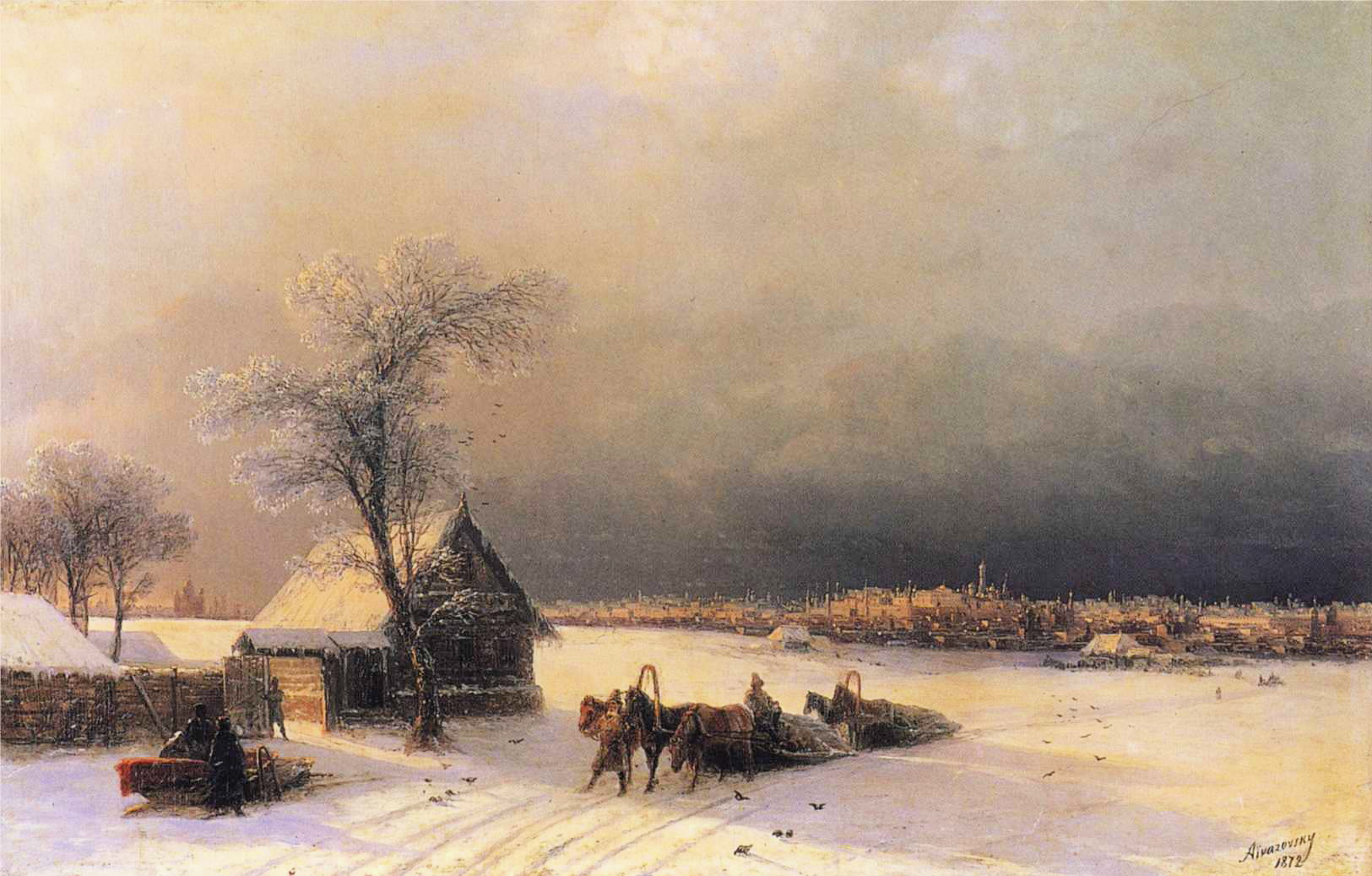
Aivazovsky: Moscow from Sparrow Hills

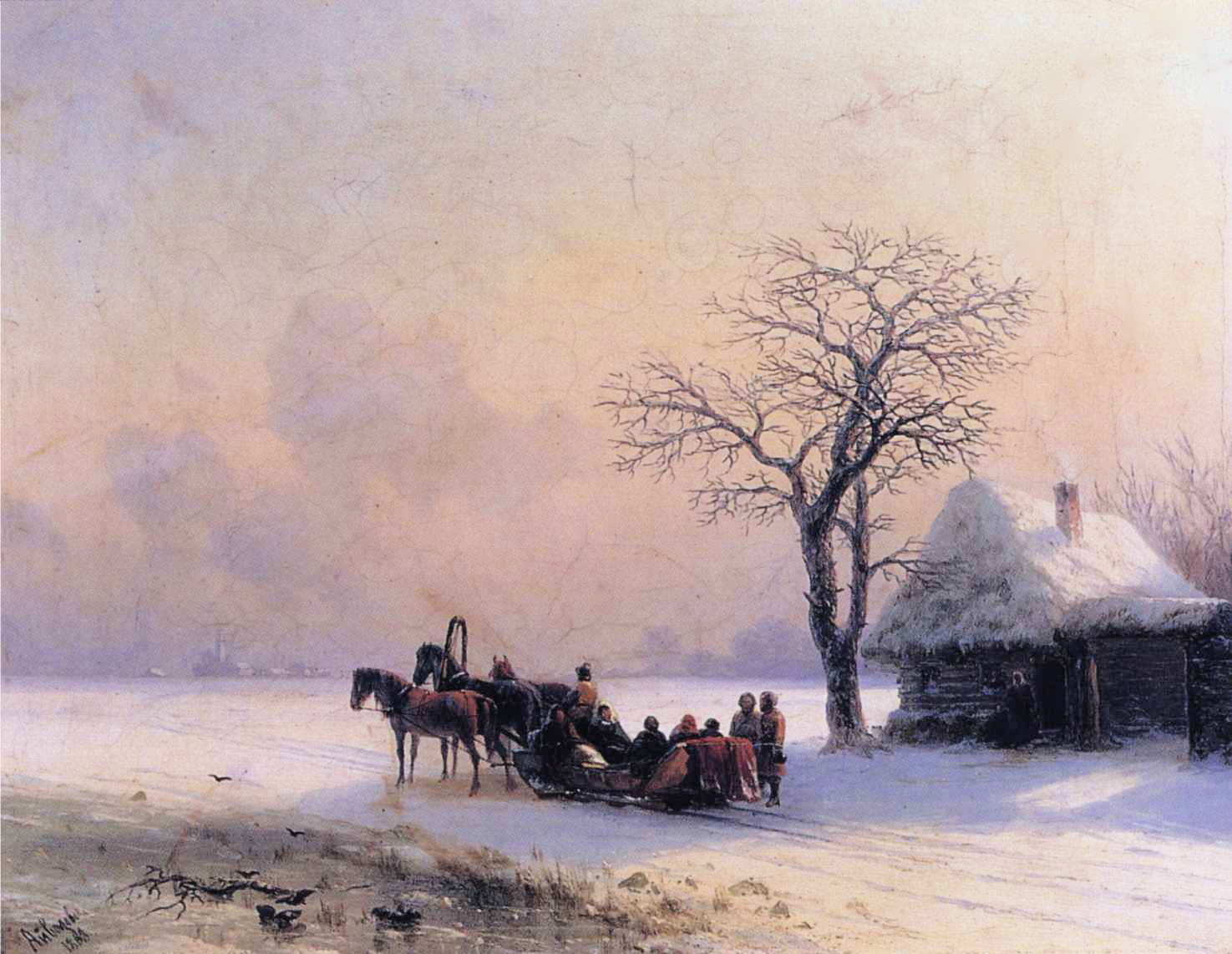
Aivazovsky: - Little Russia (1868)

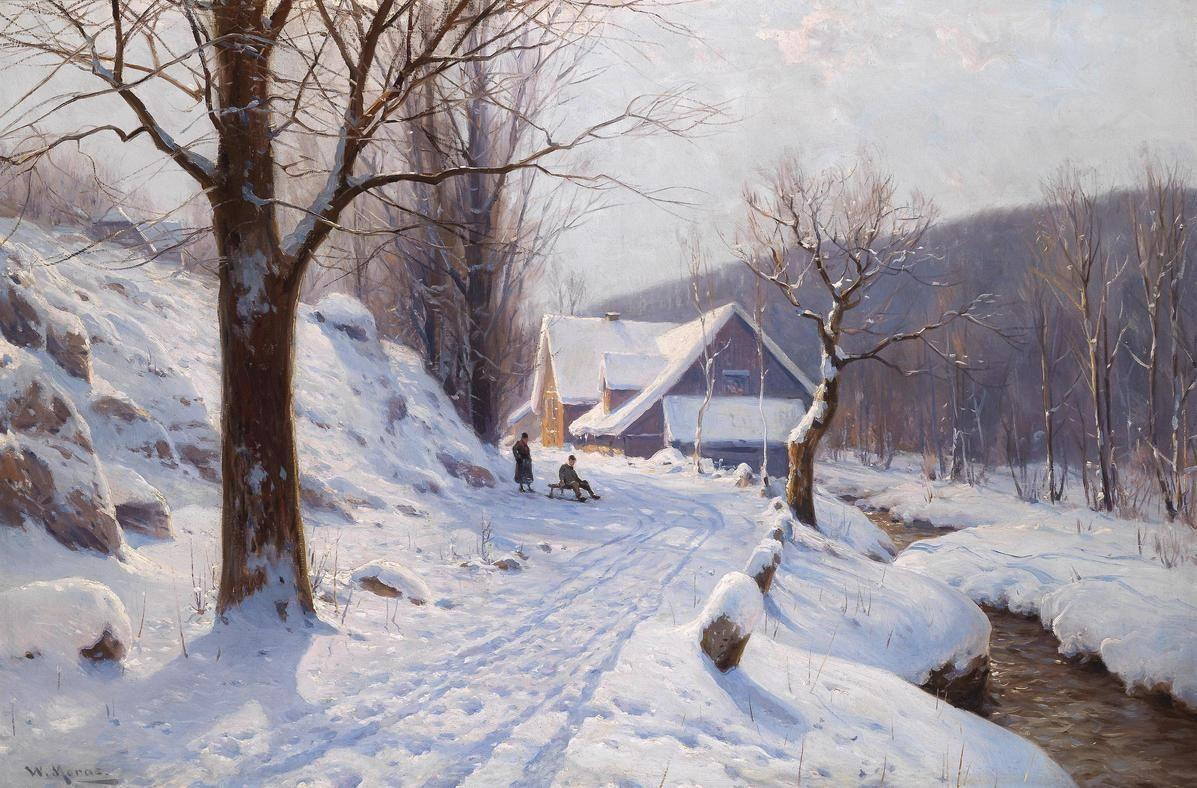
Moras Sledding on a Sunny Day

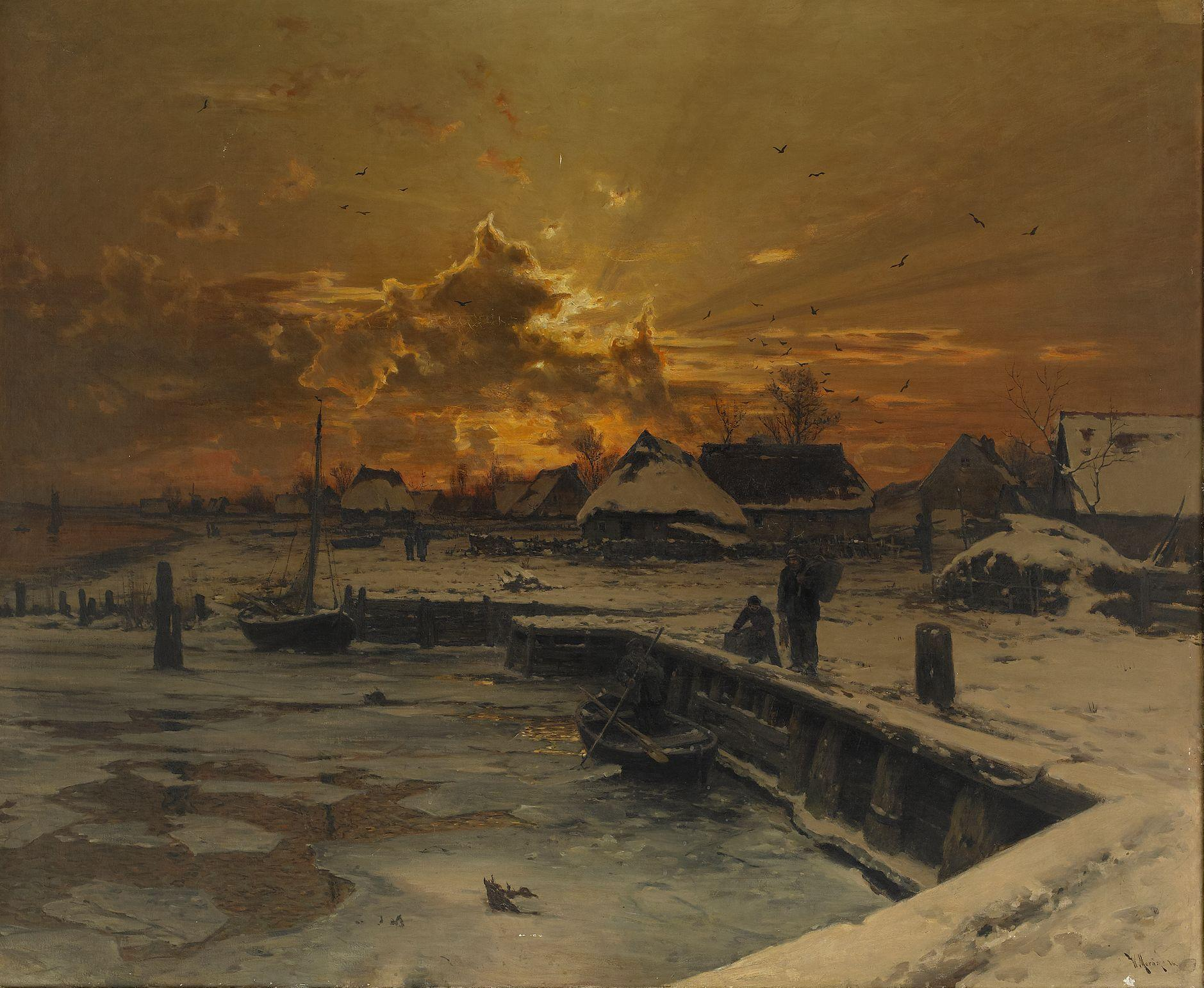
Moras: Fishing Village in Wintertime

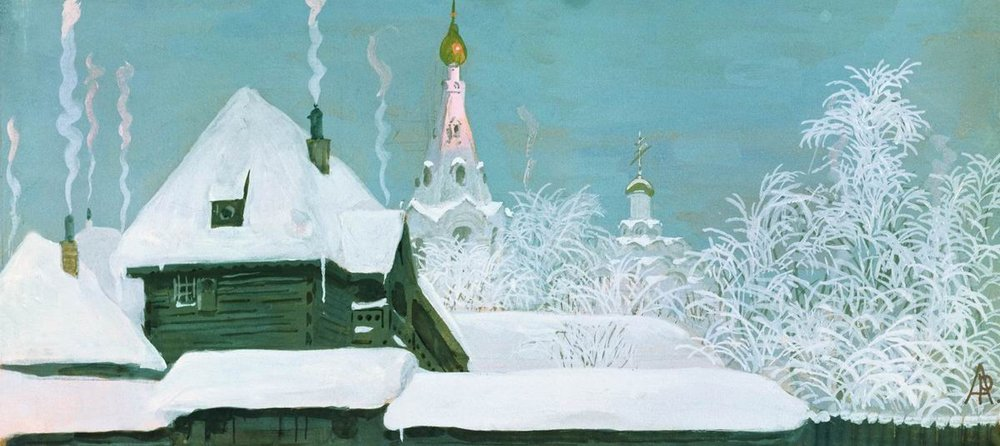
Ryabushkin: Winter morning (1903)

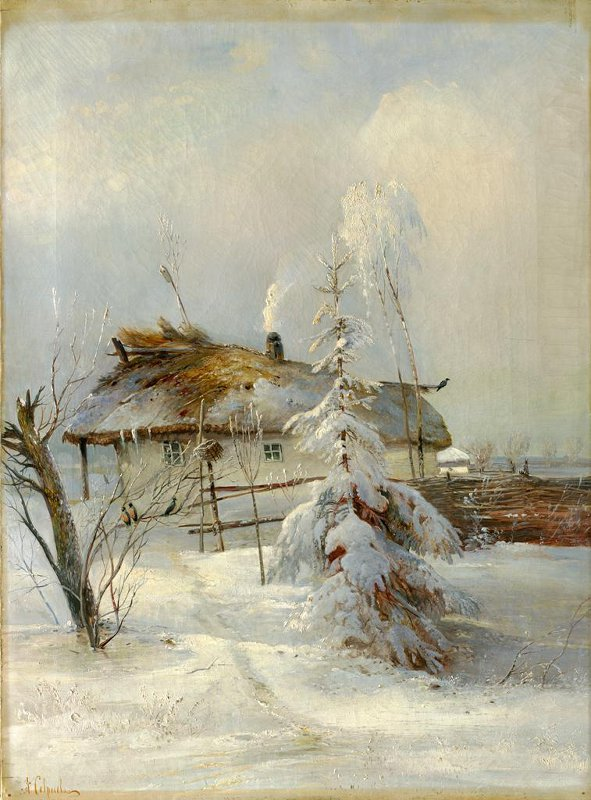
Alexei Savrasov: Winter (1873)

== See also ==
- Snow sculpture
- Landscape with Snow
- Snow Storm: Hannibal and his Army Crossing the Alps
- Effect of Snow on Petit-Montrouge
