= List of Russian artists =

This is a list of Russian artists. In this context, the term "Russian" covers the Russian Federation, Soviet Union, Russian Empire, Tsardom of Russia and Grand Duchy of Moscow, including ethnic Russians and people of other ethnicities living in Russia. This list also includes those who were born in Russia but later emigrated, and those who were born elsewhere but immigrated to the country and/or worked there for a significant period of time.

== Alphabetical list ==
=== A ===
Portrait	Person			
	Ivan Aivazovsky (1817–1900) seascape and landscape painter, portraitist (self-portrait, 1874)	The Ninth Wave, 1850	Storm, 1886	Brig "Mercury" Attacked by Two Turkish Ships, 1892
	Fyodor Alekseyev (1753–1824) cityscape and landscape painter	Red Square in Moscow, 1801	The Foundling Hospital in Moscow	The view of Nikolaev
	Nikolay Anokhin (1966–) still life and landscape painter	In the old house of Rakitins, 1998	A village, 2006	Chronos, 2007
	Evgenia Antipova (1917–2009) portrait, genre, and still life painter			
	Mark Antokolski (1843–1902) sculptor (portrait by Ivan Kramskoi, 1876)	Ivan the Terrible, 1871	Nestor the Chronicler, 1890	Yermak Timofeyevich
	Aleksey Antropov (1716–1795) painter, portraitist (self-portrait, 1784)	Ataman Krasnoschekov, 1761	Catherine II, 1760s	Unknown lady, 1760s
	Ivan Argunov (1729–1802) painter, portraitist (self-portrait, end of the 1750s)	Catherine II, 1762	Kalmyk girl Annushka, 1767	Unknown peasant girl, 1784
	Irina Azizyan (1935–2009) landscape painter	Red leaves, 1978		

=== B ===
Portrait	Person			
	Léon Bakst (1866–1924) painter, stage and costume designer (self-portrait, 1893)	Zinaida Gippius, 1906	Terror Antiquus, 1908	Costume of Cléopâtre for Ida Rubinstein, 1909
	Maria Bashkirtseva (1858–1884) painter (self-portrait, 1880)	The Studio, 1881	Autumn, 1883	The Meeting, 1884
	Nikolai Baskakov (1918–1993) portrait, genre, and landscape painter			
	Alexandre Benois (1870–1960) painter, stage designer (portrait by Léon Bakst, 1898)	Illustration to Pushkin's Bronze Horseman, 1904	Set for Stravinsky's Petrushka, 1911	At the German Quarter, 1911
	Alexandre Beridze (1975–); Expressive abstraction painter	Intersection Opus 415, 2014	Intersection Opus 232	Opus
	Ivan Bilibin (1876–1942) painter, illustrator, stage designer (portrait by Boris Kustodiev, 1901)	Set for The Golden Cockerel, 1909	Ivan Tsarevich catching the Firebird's feather, 1899	Ilya Muromets and Nightingale the Robber
	Ivan Bogdanov (1855–1932) genre painter (portrait by Leonid Solomatkin)	For calculation, 1890	Beginner, 1893	
	Nikolai Bogdanov-Belsky (1868–1945) realist painter (self-portrait, 1915)	Reading a letter, 1892	Counting in their heads, 1895	Nikolay Yusupov, 1911
	Alexey Bogolyubov (1824–1896) landscape and seascape painter	Battle of Sinop, 1860	The final moments of the imperial yacht Livadia, 1878	Sledging on the Neva, 1854
	Victor Borisov-Musatov (1870–1905) symbolist painter (self-portrait with sister, 1898)	Spring, 1898-1901	Daphnis and Chloe, 1901	The Pool, 1902
	Vladimir Borovikovsky (1757–1825) painter, portraitist (portrait by Bugaevsky-Blagodatny, a pupil of Borovikovsky)	Catherine II in Tsarskoe Selo, 1794	Maria Lopukhina, 1797	Pavel I, 1800
	Osip Braz (1873–1936) painter, portraitist	Portrait of Anton Chekhov, 1898	Wife, 1907	Portrait of painter Sergey Ivanov, 1903
	Alexander Briullov (1798–1877) neoclassical architect and painter, portraitist (self-portrait, 1830)	Castel Sant'Angelo in Rome, 1823-1826	E.M. Lvova, 1830s	Natalia Pushkina, 1831
	Karl Bryullov (1799–1852) neoclassical painter (self-portrait, 1848)	Italian midday, 1827	A horse rideress, 1832	The Last Day of Pompeii, 1830-33
	Alexey Brodovitch (1898–1971) painter, illustrator, graphic designer, photographer			
	Feodor Bruni (1799–1875) neoclassical painter (self-portrait, 1810s)	Maenad giving drink to Cupid, 1828	Z.A.Volkonskaya dressed as Tancredi, 1820s	Christ

=== C ===
Portrait	Person			
	Marc Chagall (1887–1985) painter, illustrator, stained glass artist, stage designer, ceramics and tapestries designer (portrait by Yehuda Pen)	Reclining Nude, 1911		The Fiddler, 1912
	Mikhail Chapiro (1938–) artist, painter			
	Nikolai Chekhov (1858–1889) painter, illustrator	Portrait of Anton Chekhov	The Party at Sokolniki	The Young Widow at the Grave of Her Husband
	Mihail Chemiakin (1943–) sculptor, painter, stage designer			
	Pavel Chistyakov (1832–1919) painter, arts teacher (portrait by Chistyakov's pupil Ilya Repin)	Sophia of Lithuania at the Wedding of Vasily the Blind, 1861	Giovannina sitting by the window	Patriarch Hermogenes refuses to bless the Poles
	Peter Clodt (1805–1867) sculptor	The 3rd group of Anichkov Bridge, Saint Petersburg	Ivan Krylov in Summer Garden, Saint Petersburg	Nicholas I on Isaac's Square, Saint Petersburg
	Mikhail Clodt von Jürgensburg (1832–1902) landscape painter (portrait by Ivan Kramskoi)	Oak Grove, 1863	The Volga near Simbirsk, 1881	Village in Oryol Governorate, 1864

=== D ===
Portrait	Person			
	Mechislav Dalkevich (1861–1941) artist and illustrator			
	Vasily Demut-Malinovsky (1779–1846) neoclassical sculptor	Vladimir the Great in Kiev (with Peter Clodt)	The Chariot of Victory on the Triumphal Arch of General Staff Building, Saint Petersburg	The Chariot of Victory on the Narva Triumphal Gates, Saint Petersburg
	Alexander Deyneka (1899–1969) social realist painter, graphic artist, sculptor			
	Dionisy (c. 1440–1502) medieval fresco and icon-painter	Hodegetria of Smolensk	Christ's Harrowing of Hell	Metropolitan Peter
	Nikolai Dmitriev-Orenburgsky (1838–1898) genre and battle artist (portrait by Ivan Kramskoi)	Capture of the Grivitsa redoubt at Plevna, 1885	Introduction of the Captive Osman Pasha to Alexander II at Plevna, 1898	Fire in the village, 1885
	Pyotr Drozhdin (1745–1805) portraitist (self-portrait)	Portrait of Peter the Great, 1795	Portrait of Catherine the Great, 1796	

=== E ===
Portrait	Person		
	Alexander Viktorovich Egorov (1967–); Symbolist painter	Are we more than the sum of our parts?. Oil on Canvas.	Talking in the forest, Mixed techniques on canvas, 2005
	Stepan Erzia (1876–1959); Art Nouveau sculptor, woodcut artist (a lithography by an Argentinian artist)		Sculpture in wood
	Andrey Esionov (1963–) portraitist, cityscape painter, graphic artist		
	Mikhail Evstafiev (1963–) avant-garde painter, writer, photographer	Village under a dream sky	A photo of circus Chimes act (directed by Valentin Gneushev)

=== F ===
Portrait	Person			
	Peter Carl Fabergé (1846–1920) jeweler	Memory of Azov Egg, 1891	Bouquet of Lilles Clock Egg, 1899	Moscow Kremlin egg, 1906
	Étienne Maurice Falconet (1716–1791); Rococo sculptor	Milo of Croton, 1754	Cupid menacing, 1757	Bronze Horseman, 1782
	Vladimir Favorsky (1886–1964) graphic designer, woodcut illustrator, stage designer, painter (1920s photo)	Self-portrait, Indian ink, 1912		
	Pavel Fedotov (1815–1852) realist painter	Breakfast of an Aristocrate	Encore, again Encore!	Young widow, 1851
	Konstantin Flavitsky (1830–1866) neoclassical painter (portrait by Fyodor Bronnikov, 1866)	Pharaoh's daughter finding baby Moses	Children of Jacob sell their brother Joseph, 1855	Princess Tarakanova, 1864
	Longin Frikke (1820–1893) landscape painter	View of the Fal estate of Count A. H. Benckendorff near Reval, 1837	View of the surroundings of Novocherkassk, circa 1885	Landscape with figures, circa 1845

=== G ===
Portrait	Person			
	Naum Gabo (1890–1977) constructivist sculptor, kinetic artist	Fountain by St Thomas' Hospital, London	Gestileerde bloem, a sculpture in Rotterdam	
	Nikolai Galakhov (1928–2022) landscape painter			
	Fyodor Gavrilov painter			
	Nikolai Ge (1831–1894) history painter, realist, portraitist (portrait by Nikolai Yaroshenko)	Peter the Great interrogating Tsarevich Alexei Petrovich at Peterhof Palace, 1871	Leo Tolstoy, 1882	Head of Jesus, 1893
	Mikhail Gerasimov (1907–1970) archaeologist, anthropologist, forensic sculptor			Reconstruction of Tamerlane
	Ivan Godlevsky (1908–1998); Soviet Union; Russian Federation landscape painter			
	Feofan Grek (c. 1340 – c. 1410) medieval fresco and icon-painter	St. Makarios of Egypt fresco	Our Lady of the Don	Transfiguration of Jesus, 1408
	Alexander Grigoriev (1891–1961) realist painter, public figure		Birch Grove, 1959	
	Elena Guro (1877–1913) futurist painter	Portrait of Mikhail Matyushin, 1903	Little Deer, 1908/09	

=== H ===
Portrait	Person			
	Alexei Harlamov (1840–1925) painter, portraitist	A Russian Beauty	Literary Pursuits of a Young Lady	The Flower Girls
	Viktor Hartmann (1834–1873) painter, ornamentist, architect, Russian Revival style artist	Plan for a City Gate in Kiev	Paris Catacombs	Naval Russia's pavilion at the 1873 World Fair, design

=== I ===
Portrait	Person			
	Alexander Ivanov (1806–1858) neoclassical painter (portrait by Sergey Postnikov)	Apollo	The Appearance of Christ to Mary Magdalene, 1834-36	The Appearance of Christ before the People, 1836—57
	Sergei Ivanov (1864–1910) history painter, realist, graphic artist, illustrator (portrait by Osip Braz, 1909)	Living of East Slavs	Monomachos' Princely Congress at Uvetichi	At the Southern Border of Muscovy
	Mikhail Ivanov (1748–1823) landscape painter, watercolorist (portrait by Yakov Vasilyev, 1818)	Russian squadron under the command of Vice Admiral F. F. Ushakov, sailing through the strait of Constantinople on 8 September 1798	View of the fortress in Bendery	View of three churches against the backdrop of Mount Ararat in Armenia
	Anton Ivanov-Goluboy (1818–1863) neoclassical landscape painter	Italian peasants	Fishing Vessels off a Jetty, Kostroma, 1839	Gorge

=== J ===
Portrait	Person			
	Valery Jacobi (1834–1902) neoclassical and realist painter	Serene holiday of a beggar, 1860	Prisoners Stopping Place, 1861	Jesters at the Court of Empress Anna, 1872
	Alexandre Jacovleff (1887–1938) neoclassical painter, draughtsman, designer, etcher (self-portrait Arlecchino and Pierrot,1914)	Feodor Chaliapin as Don Quichotte, 1916	Kabuki dancer	Afghans

=== K ===
Portrait	Person			
	Ilya Kabakov (1933–2023) conceptual installation artist, painter, illustrator	Installation in Münster, Germany	The fallen Chandelier in Zürich, Switzerland	Wordless, on the German-Dutch border
	Fyodor Kamensky (1836–1913) sculptor	Young sculptor, 1866	First steps, 1872	Mushroom girl
	Wassily Kandinsky (1866–1944) abstractionist painter	Der Blaue Reiter, 1903	Munich-Schwabing with the Basilica of St. Ursula, Cologne, 1908	Composition VII, 1913
	Mikhail Kaneev (1923–1983) cityscape and landscape painter			
	Nikolay Kasatkin (1859–1930) realist painter	Rival Ladies, 1890	Miner girl, 1894	Who?, 1897
	Ivan Khrutsky (1810–1885) still life and genre painter, portraitist (self-portrait, 1883)	Flowers and fruits	Portrait of a boy	Still life, 1839
	Orest Kiprensky (1782–1836) romantic painter, portraitist (self-portrait, 1828)	Yevgraf Davydov, 1809	Vasily Zhukovsky, 1815	Alexander Pushkin, 1827
	Vyacheslav Klykov (1939–2006) monument sculptor	A bell-tower in Prokhorovka, monument to the Battle of Kursk		
	Boris Kocheishvili (1940–) painter and poet			
	Stepan Kolesnikoff (1879–1955) landscape painter			
	Sergei Arksentevich Kolyada (1907–1996) painter, landscape artist, Russian avant-garde, portraitist (Self Portrait, 1934)			
	Boris Kondrashin (1923–1994) painter	Bath day, 1980	Untitled	
	Sergey Konenkov (1874–1971) sculptor (portrait by Pavel Korin)	Kore, 1912	Bather, 1917	The Poor, 1917
	Pavel Korin (1892–1967) history painter, portraitist, art restorer (portrait by Mikhail Nesterov)	Alexander Nevsky, 1932, on 1967 postage stamp		
	Konstantin Korovin (1861–1932) impressionist painter (portrait by Valentin Serov, 1891)	Two Ladies On a Terrace, 1911	Pier in Gurzuf, 1914	Feodor Chaliapin, 1915
	Alexei Korzukhin (1835–1894) genre painter	Fed up, 1886	Girlish BBQ, 1889	Return From the War, 1865
	Nikolai Kuzmin (1938–) impressionist painter			
	Mikhail Kozlovsky (1753–1802) neoclassical sculptor	Cupids, a draft	Alexander Suvorov as Mars, Saint Petersburg, 1799—1801	Samson fountain in Peterhof Palace, 1800-02
	Egor Kraft (1988–); Interdisciplinary artist, art-based researcher	Content Aware Studies, 2018—		
	Mikhail Kozlovsky (1753–1802) neoclassical sculptor	Cupids, a draft	Alexander Suvorov as Mars, Saint Petersburg, 1799—1801	Samson fountain in Peterhof Palace, 1800-02
	Ivan Kramskoi (1837–1887) painter, portraitist, arts critic (self-portrait)	Christ in the Desert, 1872	Unknown Woman, 1883	Alexander III, 1886
	Jan Kryjevski (1948–2024) painter			
	Arkhip Kuindzhi (1842–1910) landscape painter (portrait by Viktor Vasnetsov, 1869)	The Ladoga Lake, 1873	A birch grove, 1879	Elbrus, 1890-1895
	Boris Kustodiev (1878–1927) painter, stage designer (self-portrait, 1912)	The Merchant's Wife, 1918	Bolshevik, 1920	Russian Venus, 1926

=== L ===
Portrait	Person			
	Gennady Ladyzhensky (1852–1916) landscape painter (Portrait by Nikolai Kuznetsov)	Landscape near Kologriv	Chickens	Odessa
	Mikhail Larionov (1881–1964) avant-garde painter (self-portrait, 1910)	Acacias in Spring, 1904	Red Rayonism, 1913	Bull's Head, 1913
	Klavdy Lebedev (1852–1916) history painter	Svyatoslav's meeting with Emperor John	Baptism of Kievans	Dance
	Sergei Lednev-Schukin (1875–1961) landscape painter, impressionist	Church in snow (New York Metropolitan Museum)	Chapel Zvenigorod	Frosty morning at abbey gate
	Aristarkh Lentulov (1882–1943) avant-garde painter (self-portrait, 1915)	Skybell (Nebozvon)	Portrait of Artist's Wife and Daughter	Saint Basil's Cathedral, 1913
	Alexei Leonov (1934–2019) cosmonaut and amateur painter	Selenodesists (On the Moon) on 1967 post stamp	Human spacewalk on 1972 post stamp (with Andrey Sokolov)	Lunokhod 1 on 1972 post stamp (with Andrey Sokolov)
	Isaac Levitan (1860–1900) landscape painter (self-portrait, 1880)	Birch Forest, 1885-1889	Over Eternal Peace, 1894	March, 1895
	Rafail Levitsky (1847–1940) genre and portrait painter (portrait by Ilya Repin, 1878)	Bridge in the Woods, 1885-86	View of Mazzolada di Lison, Veneto, Italy, 1896	Morning Impression along a Canal in Venice, Veneto, Italy, 1896
	Dmitry Levitzky (1735–1822) portrait painter (self-portrait, 1783)	Prokofiy Demidov, 1773	Duchess Ursula Mniszech, 1782	Yekaterina Dashkova, 1784
	El Lissitzky (1890–1941) avant-garde painter, photographer, typographer (self-photo, 1924)	Suprematistische Komposition, 1919	Proun 93 (Konischer), 1923	Proun, c. 1925
	Vladimir Lisunov (1940–2000) nonconformist, mystic symbolist painter	The fugitive, 1976. Canvas, oil. 108x187.	Epiphany,1996. Canvas, oil. 90х118.	Forest visions, 1995. Canvas, oil. 60х81.
	Mikhail Lomonosov (1711–1765) polymath, scientist, writer, artist (portrait by L. S. Miropol'sky, 1787, after G. Prenner)	A ship model	Peter I mosaic, 1754	Battle of Poltava mosaic, 1762-64
	Anton Losenko (1737–1773) neoclassical painter, portraitist	Ivan Shuvalov, 1760	Fyodor Volkov, 1763	Vladimir and Rogneda, 1770

=== M ===
Portrait	Person			
	Konstantin Makovsky (1839–1915) history painter, portraitist (self-portrait, 1856)	Boyaryshnya	Tamara and Demon, 1889	Proclamation of Kuzma Minin, 1896
	Kazimir Malevich (1878–1935) avant-garde painter and theorist (self-portrait, 1912)	Englishman in Moscow, 1914	Black Square, 1915	Mower, 1930
	Sergey Malyutin (1859–1937) painter, folk artist, architect, portraitist (self-portrait)	The first Russian matryoshka doll (carved by Zvyozdochkin), 1890	Pertsov Building design, Moscow, 1906-1910	Dmitry Furmanov, 1922
	Ivan Martos (1754–1835) neoclassical sculptor (portrait by Alexander Varnek, 1819)	Minin and Pozharsky on Red Square, Moscow, 1818	Duc de Richelieu, Odessa, 1828	Alexander I, Taganrog, 1830
	Michael Matusevitch (1929–2007) painter			
	Vladimir Mayakovsky (1878–1930) avant-garde poet, playwright and propaganda artist (1912 photo)	Rosta Windows agitprop	Costumes draft for Mystery Buff, 1919	Rosta Windows agitprop
	Leonid Mezheritski (1930–2007) painter landscape, still-life, portrait (Self Portrait with Dog, 1968. Art Museum Chernigov, Ukraine)	Beach of Bolshoi Fontan, 1961	Springtime Sea Surf, 1970s	
	Yevgeniy Migunov (1921–2004); Illustrator			
	Mikhail Mikeshin (1835–1896) painter and sculpture enthusiast (portrait by Ilya Repin, 1888)	Millennium of Russia in Veliky Novgorod, 1859	Catherine II in Saint Petersburg, 1873	Bohdan Khmelnytsky in Kiev, 1888
	Efim Minin (1886–1937); Byelorussian artist and graphic artist of Jewish origin			
	Vera Mukhina (1889–1953) sculptor, social realist	A man with a sword, 1916		

=== N ===
Portrait	Person			
	Ernst Neizvestny (1925–2016) sculptor (left on photo, receiving Order of Honor from Vladimir Putin, 2000)		Lotus Flower at the Aswan Dam in Egypt, 1971	Mask of Sorrow, 1996
	Mikhail Nesterov (1862–1942) religious symbolist painter, portraitist (portrait by Viktor Vasnetsov, 1926)	The Vision to the Youth Bartholomew, 1890–91	Holy Rus', 1901-06	Philosophers Pavel Florensky and Sergei Bulgakov, 1917
	Gury Nikitin (1620/25–1691) fresco and icon-painter, illustrator	Quiricus and Julietta, c. 1680	The head of John the Baptist, c. 1680	The feast of the Cross, c. 1680
	Ivan Nikitin (1690–1742) painter, portraitist	Princess Elizabeth, 1712-1713	Hetman (Pavlo Polubotok?), 1720es	Peter the Great on his deathbed, 1725
	Aleksandr Nikolayev (1897–1957) painter			
	Nina Niss-Goldman (1892–1990) sculptor, painter		In Nina Niss-Goldman´s studio, Moscow, Verkhnyaya Maslovka Street. 1985	Still life with flowers. Canvas, oil, 48x67 cm. Impressionism painting
	Igor Novikov (1961–) painter, member of Russian Academy of Arts	Diamond Grove, 2007	Goodbye Russia, 2003	Miss Switzerland

=== O ===
Portrait	Person			
	Alexander Opekushin (1838–1923) monument sculptor, architecture decorator	Pushkin, Moscow, 1880	Karl Baer, Tartu, 1886	Lemontov Monument, Pyatigorsk
	Boris Orlovsky (1793–1837) neoclassical monument sculptor (portrait by Mikhail Markov, 1827)	Mikhail Kutuzov in front of Kazan Cathedral, Saint Petersburg	Michael Barclay de Tolly in front of Kazan Cathedral, Saint Petersburg	The angel on the Alexander Column, Saint Petersburg
	Sergei Osipov (1915–1985) landscape and still life painter	Cornflowers, 1976		

=== P ===
Portrait	Person			
	Andrey Pashkevich (1945–2011) cinematographer, film director & producer, and painter			
	Gennady Pasko (1940–) impressionist painter			
	Leonid Pasternak (1862–1945) post-impressionist painter, graphic artist, illustrator (self-portrait, 1908)	Moscow in Winter, 1912	E. Levina, 1916	Rainer Maria Rilke
	Joseph Pavlishak (1923–1995) painter and teacher, member of the USSR Union of Artists			
	Andrew Pavlovsky (1962–) expressionist painter, graphic designer	The beloved, 1994	The blue bottle, 1998	Trees at the river, 2001
	Vasily Perov (1834–1882) realist painter (self-portrait, 1870)	Troika, 1866	The Hunters at Rest, 1871	A Governess Arriving at a Merchant's House
	Kuzma Petrov-Vodkin (1878–1939) symbolist painter (self-portrait, 1918)	Bathing of a Red Horse, 1912	On the Line of Fire, 1916	Petrograd Madonna, 1918
	Ilyas Phaizulline (1950–) classical realist			
	Stepan Pimenov (1784–1833) sculptor (self portrait)	Statue of Vladimir the Great, 1807	Hercules and Antaeus, 1809	Chariot of Glory, 1827
	Vasily Polenov (1844–1927) landscape painter, realist (portrait by Ilya Repin, 1877)	A courtyard in Moscow, 1878	Grandma's garden	Caesar's amusement
	Andrei Popov (1832–1896) realist painter (self-portrait, c.1864)	An Eating House, 1859	Demyan's Fish Soup, 1865	Easter Fair in Tula, 1873
	Lyubov Popova (1889–1924) cubist abstractionist painter	Air+Man+Space, 1912	The Pianist, 1914	Portrait of a Philosopher, 1915
	Vasili Pukirev (1832–1890) realist painter (self-portrait, 1868)	The Unequal Marriage, 1862	Dowry	Metropolitan Philip and Ivan IV

=== R ===
Portrait	Person			
	Charles Radoff (1894–1986) landscape painter, neo-impressionist			
	Ilya Repin (1844–1930) history painter, realist, portraitist (self-portrait 1878)	Barge Haulers on the Volga, 1870-73	Cossacks write to the Turkish Sultan, 1880-91	What freedom!, 1903
	Alexander Rodchenko (1891–1956) avant-garde painter, sculptor, photographer, graphic designer (1935 photo)	Dance, 1913	Portrait of N. A. Rusakov, 1915	Workers' Club, 1925
	Nicholas Roerich (1874–1947) painter, philosopher, culture scientist, traveler, public figure (portrait by Boris Kustodiev, 1913)	Guests from Overseas, 1901	And we see, 1922	Monhegan, Maine, 1922
	Fyodor Rokotov (1736–1809) painter, portraitist	Count I. G. Orlov, c.1762-1765	Catherine II, 1770	Lady in a Pink Dress, 1770s
	Andrei Rublev (c. 1360–1430) medieval fresco and icon-painter (Russian Icon of St. Andrei Rublev, holding one of his works)	Trinity, c. 1410	Christ the Redeemer, c. 1410	Archangel Michael
	Alexandra Rozenman (1971–) surreal Russian American painter			
	Lev Russov (1926–1987) portrait, genre, and still life painter			
	Andrei Ryabushkin (1861–1904) history painter (portrait by Vasiliy Mate)	Tsar Mikhail Feodorovich and the Boyar Duma, 1893	Merchant Family in the 17th century, 1896	A Young Man Breaking into the Girls' Dance, 1902

=== S ===
Portrait	Person			
	Vasily Sadovnikov (1800–1879) perspective painter	Palace Square, c. 1847	Arch of the General Staff Building, 1956	Anichkov Palace, 1862
	Alexander Samokhvalov (1894–1971) easel and monumental painter, graphic artist, book illustrator			
	Bogdan Saltanov (1626–1703) icon-painter, illustrator, portraitist	Cross of Kiy of the Crucifix church in Moscow Kremlin, 1670s	Feodor III of Russia (attribution disputed), 1685	
	Konstantin Savitsky (1844–1905) realist painter (portrait by Nikolai Grandkovsky, 1902)	Repairing the Railroad , 1874	Morning in a Pine Forest by Ivan Shishkin, 1886 (Savitsky painted the bears)	To the War, 1888
	Alexei Savrasov (1830–1897) lyrical landscape painter (portrait by Iosif Volkov)	The Rooks Have Returned, 1871	Sukharev Tower, 1872	Rasputitsa (Sea of Mud), 1894
	Alexander Semionov (1922–1984) cityscape and landscape painter			
	Zinaida Serebriakova (1884–1967) painter, social realist (self-portrait At the Dressing-Table, 1909)	Bath-house, 1913	The Shoots of Autumn Crops, 1908	Harvest, 1915
	Valentin Serov (1865–1911) impressionist painter, portraitist (self-portrait, 1880s)	The girl with peaches, 1887	The Kidnapping of Europe	Ida Rubinstein, 1910
	Ivan Shadr (1887–1941) sculptor	Stone is a Weapon of the Proletariat	Worker, 1922	
	Silvestr Shchedrin (1791–1830) neoclassical landscape painter (self-portrait, 1817)	Lake of Albano, 1825	Moon Night in Naples, 1828	Terrace of the Seashore, 1828
	Georgy Shishkin (1948–) painter, portraitist, graphic artist, architect, stamp designer			400th anniversary of the reunification of the Russian nation Russian Post, 2012
	Ivan Shishkin (1832–1898) landscape painter (portrait by Ivan Kramskoi, 1880)	Morning in a Pine Forest, 1886	Rye	Rain in an Oak Forest
	Fedot Shubin (1740–1805) neoclassical sculptor (self-portrait, c. 1794)	Zakhar Chernyshov	Antonio Rinaldi, medallion, 1782	Mikhail Lomonosov, 1792
	Anatolii Ivanovich Sivkov (1952–) easel painter, graphic artist, stage designer			
	Pyotr Sokolov (1791–1848) portraitist (portrait by Vasily Tropinin, 1833)	Portrait of Idalia-Maria Poletica, 1820s	Portrait of Ekaterina Pavlovna Bakunina, 1828	Alexander II of Russia as a child, 1828
	Konstantin Somov (1869–1939) painter, graphic artist, illustrator, portraitist (self-portrait, 1898)	Alexander Blok's Theatre, 1909	A galant scene	Sergei Rachmaninoff, 1925
	Grigory Soroka (1823–1864) genre painter, portraitist (self-portrait)	Dam in Spasskoye, Tambov Guberniya, 1840s	Peasant boy, 1840s	Reflection in a mirror, 1850s
	Evgraf Semenovich Sorokin (1821–1892) painter, professor Portrait by Vladimir Makovsky, 1891	Crucifixion of Christ, 1873	Rendezvous, 1858	Spanish Beggar Girl, 1852
	Alexei Stepanov (1858–1923) genre painter	The Swing	Morning Greetings	Moose Herd
	Alexander Stupin (1776–1861) painter Portrait by Alexander Varnek, 1804	Boy with a Leaf		
	Rafael Stupin (1798–1860s) painter			
	Vasily Surikov (1848–1916) history painter (self-portrait)	Bronze Horseman, 1870	Boyaryna Morozova, 1887	Suvorov crossing the Alps, 1899

=== T ===
Portrait	Person			
	Nikolai Timkov (1912–1993) landscape painter			
	Feodor Tolstoy (1783–1873) neoclassical painter, illustrator, medallion and wax-relief artist (portrait by Sergey Zaryanko, 1850)	People's militia of 1812, 1816	Family portrait, 1830	An illustration to Dushenka, 1820-33
	Nikolai Tomsky (1900–1984) monument sculptor	Statue of Lenin, Berlin, 1970	Nikolai Gogol, Moscow, 1952	
	Vasily Tropinin (1776–1857) romantic painter, portraitist (self-portrait, 1844)	The Lace Maker, 1823	Alexander Pushkin, 1827	Woman in the window, 1841
	Zurab Tsereteli (1934–) painter, sculptor, architect		Birth of a New Man, 1995	
	Israel Tsvaygenbaum (1961–) painter	People Of Derbent, 1999	Duet, 2000	Abraham And Isaac, 2001
	Alexander Tyshler (1898–1980) modernist painter, stage designer			

=== U ===
Portrait	Person			
	Grigory Ugryumov (1764–1823) neoclassical history painter (portrait miniature by Aleksandr Golovachevsky, 1814)	Testing the strength of Jan Usmar, 1796-97	Vocation of Mikhail Romanov, before 1800	Capture of Kazan by Ivan the Terrible, before 1800
	Yevgeny Ukhnalyov (1931–2015) painter, illustrator, designer, heraldic artist	Standard of the president of Russia	Star of the Order of Service to the Fatherland	State Prize of Russia medal
	Simon Ushakov (1626–1686) icon-painter	Saviour Not Made by Hands, 1658	Archangel Michael Trampling the Devil Underfoot, 1676	Last Supper, 1685

=== V ===
Portrait	Person			
	Nina Tokhtaman Valetova (1958–) metaphysical realism, fantasy, and visionary painter	Claustrophobia, 2003	Lost Without a Trace, 2008	Ancient Epics of Ancestors, 2008
	Feodor Vasilyev (1850–1873) lyrical landscape painter (self-portrait, 1873)	After a Thunderstorm, 1868	Illumination in St. Petersburg, 1869	Wet Meadow, 1872
	Apollinary Vasnetsov (1856–1933) history painter, stage designer (portrait by Nikolai D. Kuznetsov, 1897)	Arrival of Rurik to Ladoga	Set for Tchaikovsky's opera The Oprichnik, 1911	Moscow Kremlin, 1897
	Viktor Vasnetsov (1848–1926) mythology and history painter, Russian Revival style artist (portrait by Nikolai D. Kuznetsov, 1891)	Flying Carpet, 1880	Bogatyrs, 1898	The Frog Princess, 1918
	Alexey Venetsianov (1780–1847) genre painter (self-portrait, 1810)	In the Ploughed Field: Spring, 1820s	Girl in a shawl	Fortune telling, 1842
	Vasily Vereshchagin (1842–1904) battle painter	The Apotheosis of War, 1871	Suppression of the Indian Revolt by the English, 1884	Peace at all costs (Napoleon in Moscow)
	Pyotr Vereshchagin (1834–1886) landscape and cityscape painter	The Market in Nizhny Novgorod	View of the Palace of Grand Duke Mikhail Nikolayevich, Viceroy of His Imperial Majesty in Tiflis	View of Moscow Kremlin, 1879
	Ivan Vishnyakov (1699–1761) portraitist	Petr Ivanovich Panin, 1742	A Girl with a Bird	Sarah Eleonor Fermor, 1750
	Adrian Volkov (1827–1873) genre painter (self-portrait, 1868)	The Interrupted Betrothal, 1860	Obzhorny Ryad in Saint Petersburg, 1858	Early snow
	Ekaterina Vorona (1975–) painter			
	Mikhail Vrubel (1856–1910) symbolist painter (self-portrait, 1885)	The Demon Seated, 1890	The Swan Princess, 1900	Pearl oyster, 1904
	Yevgeny Vuchetich (1908–1974) monument sculptor	Soviet War Memorial in Berlin, 1946-49	Let Us Beat Swords into Plowshares in the UN garden, New York City, 1957	The Motherland Calls, 1967

=== W ===
Portrait	Person			
	Marianne von Werefkin (1860–1938) avant-garde expressionist painter (self-portrait, c. 1910)	Autumn. School, 1907	A Red City, 1909	Stormwind
	Constantin Alexandrovich Westchiloff (1875–1945) impressionist painter	On the Road, 1903	Breakthrough of the Cruiser Askold in 1904 in the Yellow Sea, 1906	Still Life on a Terrace

=== Y ===
Portrait	Person			
	Nikolai Yaroshenko (1846–1898) realist, genre and landscape painter, portraitist (self-portrait, 1895)	Gipsy Woman, 1886	On Swing, 1888	Vladimir Solovyov, 1892
	Konstantin Yuon (1875–1958) painter, stage designer (self-portrait, 1912)	Troitse-Sergiyeva Lavra from Vokzalnaya Street, 1911	Rostov the Great in Winter, 1906	Blue Bush, 1908

=== Z ===
Portrait	Person			
	Nikolai Zagorsky (1849–1893) genre painter	David and Saul, 1873	At the local hospital, 1886	The Carpenter , 1887
	Pyotr Zakharov-Chechenets (1816–1846) painter, portraitist (self-portrait, 1842)	Children of Pyotr Yermolov, 1839	Aleksey Petrovich Yermolov, 1842	Timofey Granovsky, 1845
	Karp Zolotaryov (fl. last quarter of the 17th century) icon-painter, interior designer, wood carver	Saints Faith, Hope and Charity and their mother Sophia, 1685	Theotokos and The Child	
	Alexey Zubov (1682 – c. 1750) etcher	Swedish Ships Brought to Saint Petersburg after the Battle of Gangut, 1715	View of Catherinehof, 1716	Battle of Grengam, end of the 1720s

== See also ==
- Russian Academy of Arts
- List of 19th-century Russian painters
- List of 20th-century Russian painters
- List of Russian landscape painters
- List of painters of Saint Petersburg Union of Artists
- Category:Russian artists
- List of Russian architects
- List of Russian inventors
- List of Russian explorers
- List of Russian language writers
- Russian culture
