= Anokhin =

Anokhin is a common Russian surname. Notable people having this surname include:

- Andrey Victorovitch Anokhin (1867–1931) Russian ethnographer, musical scientist and composer
- Liza Anokhina (born 2007), Russian blogger
- Maksim Olegovich Anokhin (Limewax; born 1988), Ukrainian musician
- Nikolay Yuryevich Anokhin (born 1966), Russian artist
- Pyotr Kuzmich Anokhin (1898–1974), Russian biologist and physiologist
- Sergei Anokhin (disambiguation)
  - Sergei Nikolayevich Anokhin (born 1981), Russian football player
  - Sergei Nikolaevich Anokhin (1910–1986), Russian test pilot
- Vasily Anokhin (born 1983), Russian politician
- Yelena Anokhina (born 1947), Soviet diver
