= Andrew Pavlovsky =

Russian painter

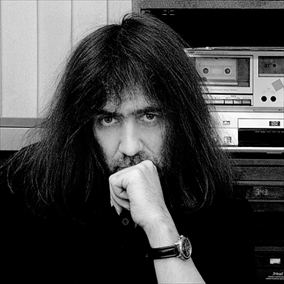
- Born: 1962 (age 63–64); Moscow
- Known for: Graphic design, Advertising, Painting

Andrew Rostislavovich Pavlovsky is a Russian artist. He is a member of the Moscow Artists Union, the International Federation of Artists (IFA) and Russian Philosophical Union.

== Biography ==
Pavlovsky's family comes from the nobles of South-Western land of the Russian Empire and the Don Military. Among his ancestors were participants of the War of 1812, listed on the memorial board of the Cathedral of Christ the Savior; Anatoly A. Linkov, a participant of the Ice March of the White Army (1918), (insignia 3543) and F.P. Kazantsev, railway inventor and engineer.

He was influenced by Dmitry A. Shuvalov (1932–2013), a Russian artist, a professor of St. Petersburg Art and Industry Academy, and Serafim A. Pavlovskiy (1903–1989), a graduate of VKHUTEMAS.

Pavlovsky began his painting career in 1984. His paintings are kept in private collections in Russia, Germany, the U.S., and Sweden.

In 1986 Pavlovsky began working in graphic design and advertising. He collaborated with the Central Committee of the Leninist Young Communist League of the Soviet Union, the Stas Namin Music Center (SNC), publishing houses «Raduga», All Union Record Studio «Melodiya», the Central State Concert Hall «Rossiya», Mosconcert, Moscow State Philarmony, «MiG» corporation, VNPO «ELEKTRONIKA». He was designer of the contest of «Moscow beauty», commercial advertisements and performing artists posters. During the Perestroika period he worked as the director of several advertising agencies: JUPITER (USSR- Hong Kong Joint venture) and SODRUZHESTVO (USSR-USA Joint venture) combining the work of the art consultant and graphic designer. During early Post-soviet times he worked for Russian Government Administration, Russia's State Department of Economic Development and Trade, Russian versions of magazines ELLE, ELLE-Decor, Moulin ROUGE, ANTOURAGE, MEZZANINE, Russian Information Agency «NEWS». Pavlovsky designed advertisements for «Moscow days» in Warsaw, Prague, Madrid, Budapest (director and producer Sergey Vinnikov) and Vienna. Pavlovsky was a producer of art projects such as «The portrait of science in centuries. Moisey Nappelbaum, Alexander Marov», St. Petersburg State Photography Center, 2007. In 1987–1990 he taught at the Studio of the visual perception esthetics «Studio A» where he had introduced a methodology to train a «Viewer». In 2002 he was organizer and chief artist of the creative association M’ART Group.

== Aesthetics ==
Pavlovsky's main discipline is graphic design. He represents a transitional generation of Russian artists between the Soviet and Post-soviet eras. His design style was influenced by Russian constructivism. Pavlovsky coined a term "additive constructivism". His commercial posters are kept in the collection of the Russian State Library.

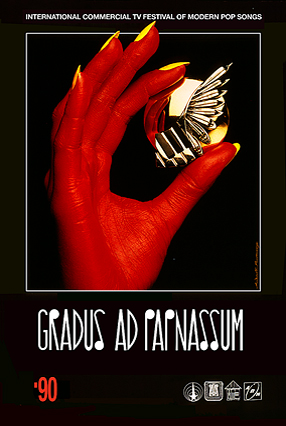
Poster for The International TV-festival of Modern Song, 90x60 cm, 1990

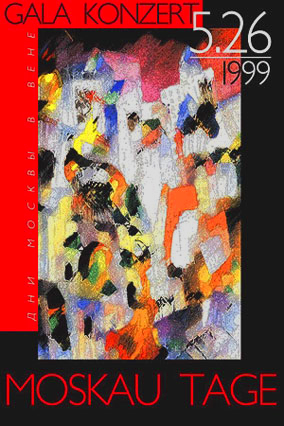
Poster for «Moscow days» in Vienna, 100x70 cm, 1999

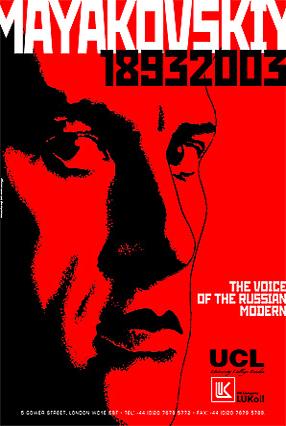
Poster for Literary evening in London, 100x70 cm, 2003

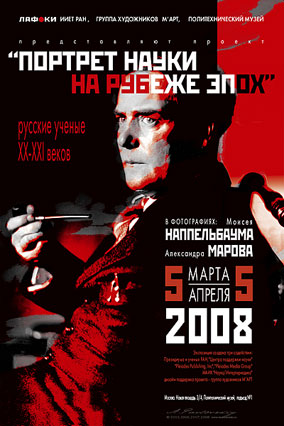
Photo-exhibition Poster, 90x60 cm, 2005-2008

== Projects ==
- Russia – the Planet of Space, M.: Publishing House: RIA «News» (RIAN), 2002. Client: Russian Government Administration (producers: Alexey Volin, Kuzma Mikhailov). 50 000 copies in five languages;
- Deluxe Album edition Department of the Economic Development and Trade. 1802-2002, M.: Publishing house: RIA «News», 2002. Client: Department of the Economic Development and Trade of the Russian Federation. 10 000 copies;
- CHECHNYA. Questions & Answers, M.: Publishing house – RIA «News» (RIAN) 2003. Client – RF President Administration. Total circulation quantity –12 000 copies in six languages;
- Russian Booker, Prize Chief Advertisement Designer 2004 (2005). Client: «Open Russia – Russian Booker»;
- We will recall this sometimes, M.: Publishing house: Department of the Economic Development and Trade of the Russian Federation, 2005. Client: Department of the Economic Development and Trade of the Russian Federation. 5000 copies;
- United Technologies in Russia 2002–2006. M.: UTIO. Client: UT International Operations (producer – Natalia Sorokina), 10 000 copies (four editions at two languages);
- Promotional posters for Lora Kvint, Alla Pugacheva, Brigada S, RONDO, Korroziya Metalla, Scorpions (coupled with GP), etc.
- Advertisements in magazines ELLE, ELLE-Decor, AD, MEZZANINE, Moulin ROUGE (Russian Editions).

== Painting ==
Painting gives Pavlovsky space for rest from modern design creative conflicts and serves as a platform for research in the field of color, proportions, and composition, and informs his design work. He sticks to the Russian aesthetic tradition of the 20th century. He doesn’t have a large number of paintings but they demonstrate his love for color and respect to the masters of the past.

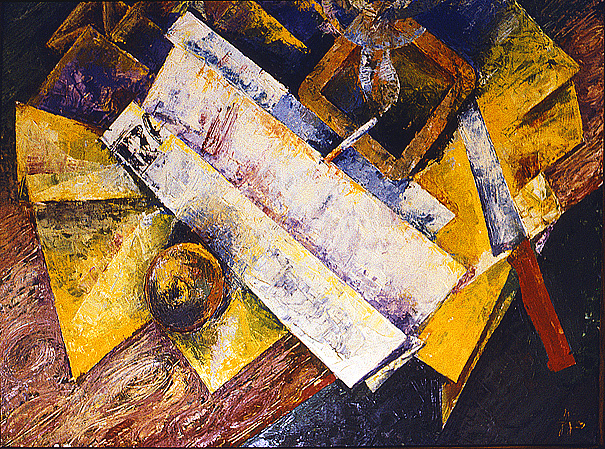
PRAVDA piece. Oil on canvas, 90x110 cm, 1991

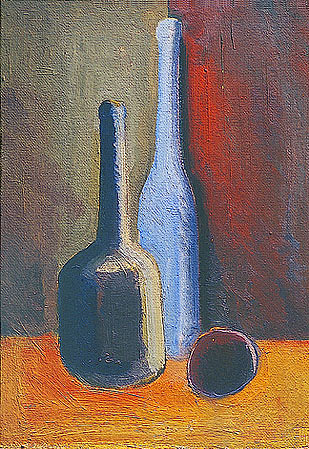
The blue bottle, Oil on plywood, 80x70 cm, 1998

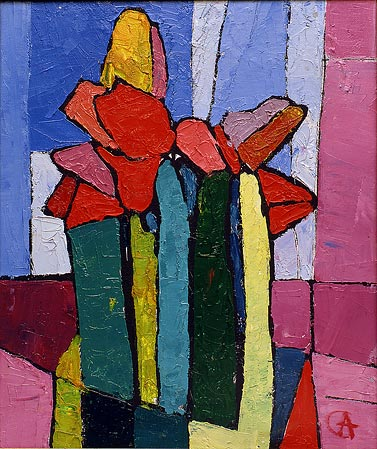
Flowers at a window, Oil on canvas, 100x80 cm, 2001

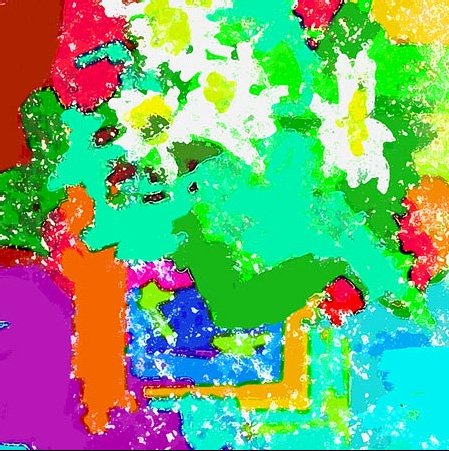
Morning still-life, monotypy, 70x70 cm, 2004

== Sources ==
- ANTOURAGE. Magazin. Publishing House Antourage XXI, registration 018740-99, 30000 copies, #12, Page 051.
- DOROGOY ZHURNAL. Publishing House Moskovskie novosti, registration 018589, 10000 copies, winter 2002/2003(Inlay).
- MODNOE BELJE. Magazine, registration PI 77-17065, 25700 copies, August/September 2004(BackCover).
- BRIDE. Magazine, Publishing House Everest + ALAFOLIE Paris, registration PI 77-4457, 20000 copies, November/December 2001, page 61.
- MOULIN ROUGE. Magazine, Rodionov Publishing House + EMAP FRANCE, registration PI 77-12587, 80000 copies, October 2004, page 3; May 2006 (Inlay).
- ELLE DÉCOR. Magazine, Russian edition, COMPAGNIE INTERNATIONALE DE PRESS ET DE PUBLICITE S.A.M., registration PI -777508, 70000 copies, Number 1, page 31.
- МВ. Magazine, MIGENTA, registration PI -775301, 60000 copies, March 2002, third cover page; December 2002, page 87; April 2004 (Inlay).
- MEZZANINE. Magazine, PARLANT, registration 015924, 50000 copies, 2001, N3, page 37.
- WATCH BUSINESS. Magazine, In Chаs Publishing House, registration PI 77-1451, 5000 copies, 2001, N4, page 18; N5, page 3.
- OPTIMUM. Magazine, Le Magazine de L'Optimum, Rodionov Publishing House Under the license Les Editions Jalou, registration PI -77-17399, 70000 copies, October 2004, page 23.
- WHO IS WHO в РОССИИ. — The International Business Who is Who Corp (Panama), Who is Who, «Verlag für Personenenzyklopädien AG'» (Switzerland), 2008 / 2009. — ISBN 978-3-7290-0069-8

== See also ==
- List of Russian artists
