= Anatoly Sivkov =

Russian painter

- Born: Anatoly Ivanovich Sivkov; February 18, 1952; Meret, Siberia
- Died: February 7, 2017 (aged 64)
- Education: Novosibirsk State University
- Known for: Painting
- Movement: Contemporary

Anatoly Ivanovich Sivkov (Russian: Анатолий Иванович Сивков; also spelled Anatolii; February 18, 1952 – February 7, 2017) is a contemporary Russian painter. Sivkov studied from 1966 to 1973 at the renowned Novosibirsk State University in Akademgorodok, a suburb of Novosibirsk. In recent years he lived and worked in St. Petersburg. He was buried at the Kovalevsky cemetery in St. Petersburg.

== Career ==
After completing his training; Sivkov in 1976 entered the faculty at the Leningrad Institute of Theatre. In pre-perestroika Soviet Russia Sivkov began to work as a creative director for a number of theatres in Leningrad and Perm. With the collapse of the Soviet Union in 1991 his career as an artist grew independently from the artistic mainstream. He is recognized as a member of the Union of Artist of the Russian Federation. Sivkov has participated in exhibitions in St. Petersburg, Moscow, Paris, London, Amsterdam and North America. In 2002 a retrospective of his work was held in Regensburg, Germany.

== Modernist influences ==
As a student Sivkov yearned to explore outside the teleological-milieu of socialist realism the official aesthetic of the Soviet Union since the 1930s. In a rare public exhibition held in 1967 Novosibirsk he was introduced to the radical work of Pavel Nikolayevich Filonov. Filonov was an influential artist of the early Russian avant-garde whose canvases examined the inner substance of their subject. Along with Filonov's analytical art Sivkov’s oeuvre illustrates the influences of Wassily Kandinsky's (Russian: Василий Кандинский) inner necessity, and Joan Miró's biomorphic masses.

== Work ==
Sivkov's paintings are characterized by a kaleidoscopic complexity of colour, the layered impasto of his palette, and an applied etching technique that reinforces a sense of flatness in his composition. Sivkov’s style is enormously individualistic and is evasive of classification. His art holds a tense equilibrium between unrelinquished expression and compositional exactitude.

=== Colour ===

Sivkov’s paintings are composed by the heavy, garish sumptuousness of his palette. His colours and application of, are expressive. The eloquence of his colours come to delineate the non-perspectival pictorial space. Combined with the impasto texture of his work, Sivkov's palette creates a technically sensorial opus.

=== Sivkov's Lines ===
Sivkov's line art aesthetic, which he employs by a process of applying a heated needle to his thickly coated canvases, adds a compositional element that distinguishes his style from his contemporaries. His work draws inspiration from the ancient temple reliefs of Egypt and Mesopotamia. This is most evident in his proportionality, sense of imposing permanence and almost exclusively depicting the facial profile of his subjects. A correlation can be inferred in his work between ancient bas-reliefs and line art. Despite the fact that line art tends to be monochromatic Sivkov's engraved lines act in a semi-autonomous relationship from the other elements in his compositions. In this fashion his lines act independently from the artist's palette to emphasize form and outline.

== Exhibitions ==
Solo and group exhibitions:

- 1997: Group exhibition S.S.S.R., or in Cyrillic 'C.C.C.P' (Synochkin, Sivkov, Safronov. Russia) in the Dostoevsky Literary Memorial Museum, St. Petersburg.
- 1997: Winner of "Window on Holland" exhibition, the Consulate of the Netherlands in St. Petersburg.
- 1996-98: Season auctions of Russian artists working in Paris.
- 1998: Group exhibition in Rochester City, NY.
- 1999: Group Exhibition, Santa Barbara, California.
- 2000: ARTEXPO San Francisco, California.
- 2001: ARTEXPO New York, New York.
- 2003: Group exhibition at Mr. and Mrs. Tovbin home. San - Francisco, California.
- 2003: Group exhibition at Mr. and Mrs. Portnoy, Hillsborough, Calif.
- 2004: Group exhibition in publishing place Artodox, San - Francisco, California.
- 2007: Mix: Russian Contemporary Art. Group exhibition at Fort Mason, San Francisco, California.
- 2010: Group exhibitions outside the U.S: the Netherlands, Britain, France, Russia (St. Petersburg, Moscow, Novosibirsk)
- 2010: Personal exhibition in Galerie Vinogradov, Berlin.

== See also ==
- Line Art
- Contemporary art
- Analytical art
- bas-reliefs
- List of Russian artists
