= Charles Radoff =

Russian painter

Xavier Basil Radoff (15 March 1894 – 1986) was a Russian painter.

== Biography ==
Xavier Basil Radoff (Charles Radoff) was born on March 15, 1894, in Izmail, Bessarabia, Russian Empire (present-day Ukraine). Born to Basil Radoff and Marta Eudokia-Radoff. He was the second son and had three sisters. His family was poor and all the family finances went toward the eldest son's education. His father died when he was very young. His mother remarried but he was never close with his stepfather.

The area he grew up in was diverse in its peoples and cultures. Radoff attained a second grade education only. He then had to start working to help support the family. He was raised in the Russian Orthodox Church.

At the age of 18, Radoff emigrated to the United States arriving at Ellis Island on December 5, 1912. After settling, Radoff chose the Anglicized name "Charles", which he used the rest of his life.

Radoff lived in New York City working any job he could find. He eventually found employment at a posh club for the rich as a member of the wait staff. Here he was taught tennis and learned to play rather well. He would sketch in pencil some of the sights in New York. These drawings are lost.

Radoff served in the United States Army Cavalry during World War I. The U.S. Army Air Service#Air Service of the AEF became aware of Radoff's skills as an artist. His duties included serving as an aerial observer with the Air Corps. While airborne, he would hand draw maps of enemy positions for use in planning by the command staff.

Radoff loved France and would revisit in 1921 where he met and later married Camille Alice Richard. The couple stayed in France as shop owners until 1932. The Radoff's emigrated to the United States for fear of increasing tensions in Europe. They toured the entire US eventually settling in Los Angeles. Their only child, Vivian Renee Toensing (née Radoff), was born in Los Angeles in 1933 and died in Valencia California in 2013.

Radoff continually dabbled with sketching over the years. He didn't take it up as a vocation until the late 1950s. He was living in Southern California and opened an Art Gallery in the San Fernando Valley. He had galleries in Van Nuys, Corona del Mar and Reseda. He may have shown his work at the Festival of Arts in Laguna Beach in the mid-1960s.

Radoff mostly painted seascapes and florals. He tried some neo-impressionist styles also. He was an admirer of Marc Chagall’s work.

Radoff continued to paint until he had a stroke in 1985. He died a year later in 1986.

== See also ==
- List of Russian artists
