= Anton Ivanov-Goluboy =

Russian painter

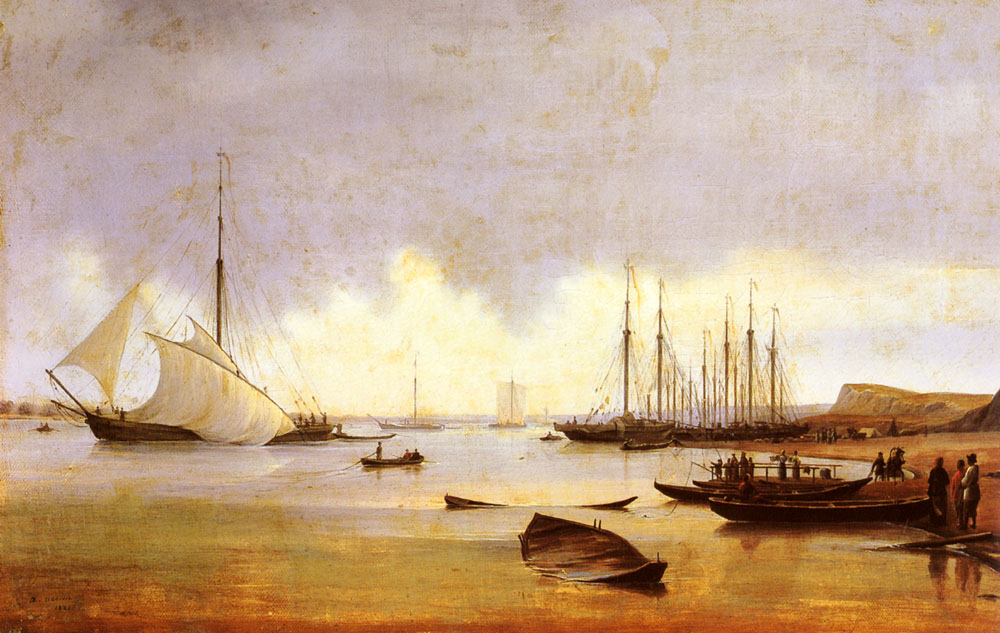
Fishing Vessels off a Jetty, believed to be Kostroma, 1839

Anton Ivanovich Ivanov-Goluboy (Russian: Антон Иванович Иванов-Голубой; 1818 – 6 December [O.S. 24 November] 1863) was a Russian painter.

== Biography ==
Anton Ivanov was born a serf in a village of Kozakovo, Vladimir gubernia. From 1833 he studied painting in Saint Petersburg with Chernetsov brothers. In 1838 he accompanied them on a trip on Volga River. In 1841 he was redeemed from serfdom by Chernetsov brothers. From 1841 to 1849 he was a pensioner of the Imperial Academy of Arts. From 1846 he lived in Italy. He died in Rome and is buried at the Protestant Cemetery.

== See also ==
- List of Russian artists

== External sources ==
- Anton Ivanov article in Artcyclopedia
- Genealogia.ru
