= Sergei Anokhin =

Sergei Anokhin may refer to:

- Sergei Anokhin (footballer) (born 1981), Russian footballer
- Sergey Anokhin (politician) (born 1964), Russian politician
- Sergei Anokhin (test pilot) (1910–1986), Soviet test pilot and potential cosmonaut
