= Boris Kondrashin =

Russian and Soviet painter

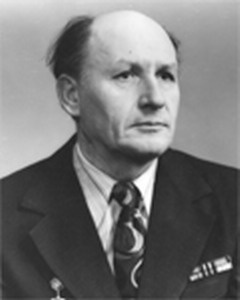
Boris Kondrashin

Boris Vasilevich Kondrashin (Russian: Борис Васильевич Кондрашин; 16 August 1923 – 7 May 1994) was a Russian and Soviet painter of socialist realism, member of the Union of artists since 1960, member of Union, republican and regional exhibitions.

== Biography ==
Boris Kondrashin was born in Sverdlovsk in 1923. He began his study at the Sverdlovsk Art School of Shadr in 1938, but his training was interrupted by the war. He graduated from school specializing in aviation mechanics. He went to the front in October 1941. Since 1943, he was in the aviation wing, freeing the western frontiers of USSR (participated in the battles for the liberation of Belarus and the Baltic States), reached Poland and Germany, participated in the battles for the liberation of Kenigsberg. Kondrashin was awarded the medal Medal "For the Capture of Königsberg", Order of the Patriotic War, "For Courage", "Victory over Germany in the Second War of 1941-1945", and memorative medals.

He resumed art classes in 1948. In 1950 he entered the Moscow State Academic Art Institute of Surikov and trained under the guidance of many masters. In 1956 he successfully graduated from college, and began working in the art field. Kondrashin was the head of the department of painting at the Architectural Institute in Yekaterinburg for 20 years.

Works of Kondrashin are stored in the Art Fund of the Russian Federation, in The Science and Research Museum of the Russian Academy of Arts (St. Petersburg), in the House of Officers of the Central Military District of the city of Yekaterinburg, in Yekaterinburg Art Gallery, in Nizhny Tagil Art Museum, in Irbit Art gallery, as well as in galleries of Moscow, United States, France, Germany and Taiwan.

== Works ==
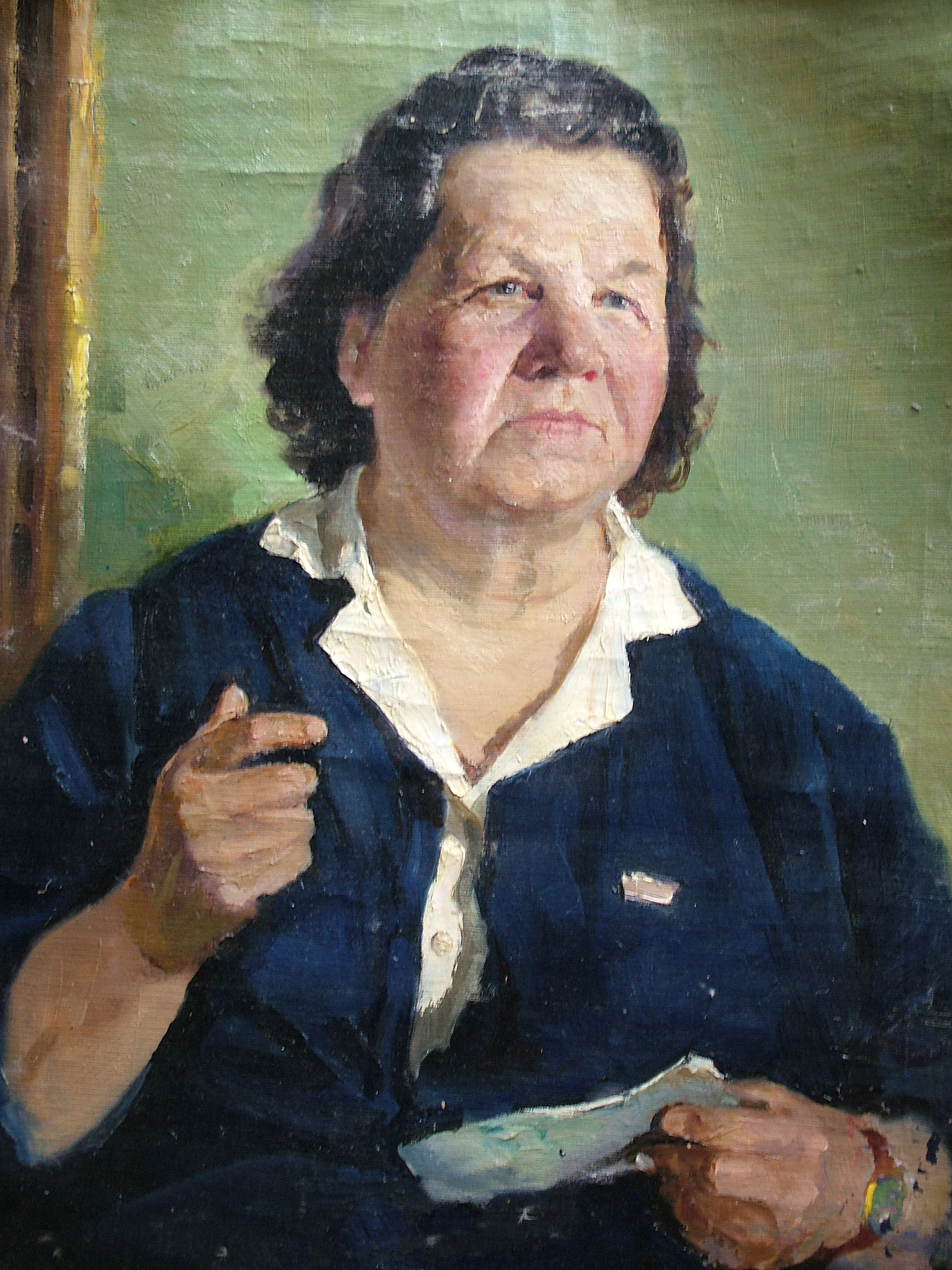
Portrait

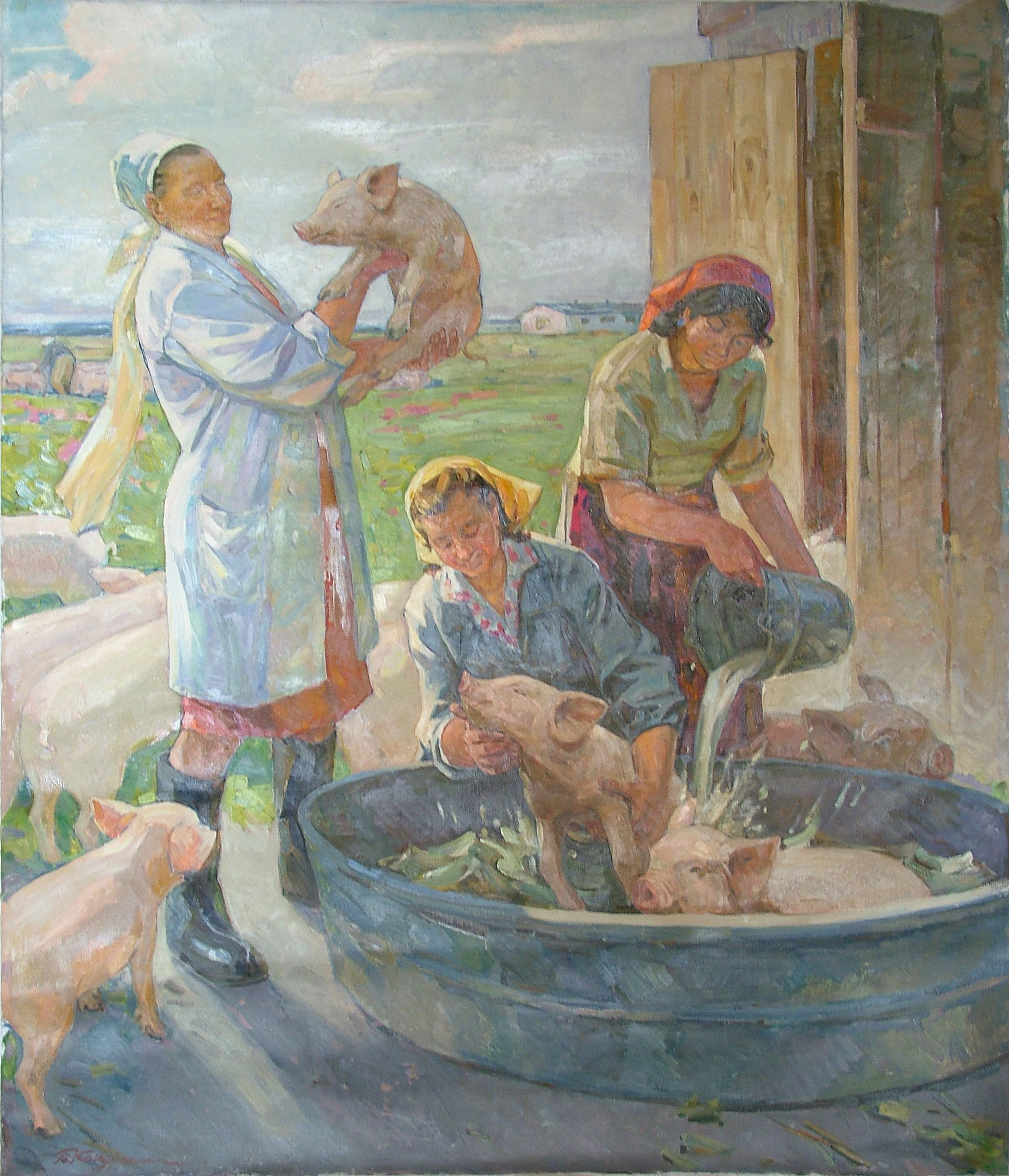
Bath day
