= Joseph Pavlishak =

Russian painter

- Born: Joseph Andreyevich Pavlishak; September 20, 1923; Kaluga, USSR
- Died: September 27, 1995 (aged 72); Kaluga, Russia
- Education: State Art Institute of the Estonian SSR
- Known for: Painting
- Movement: realism impressionism

Joseph Andreyevich Pavlishak (Russian: Иосиф Андреевич Павлишак; September 20, 1923 in Kaluga – September 27, 1995 in Kaluga) was a Soviet and Russian painter and teacher. He was a member of the USSR Union of Artists since 1953. Honored Painter of Russia. He participated in the Great Patriotic War.

He was a participant of the All-Union exhibition of the I Congress of painters in Moscow (1957).

Pavlishak's paintings arose as a result of the natural expansion and development of landscape and portrait themes. These are generalized but expressive images of Soviet peasant women. These are major, energetic, and at the same time poetic stories about peasant life, about Russia.

Shortly before his death, he was introduced to the title of People's Artist of the Russian Federation, but he did not get an estimate.

Joseph Pavlishak died in the fall of 1995 at the 73rd year of his life.
