= Nikolay Anokhin =

Russian artist

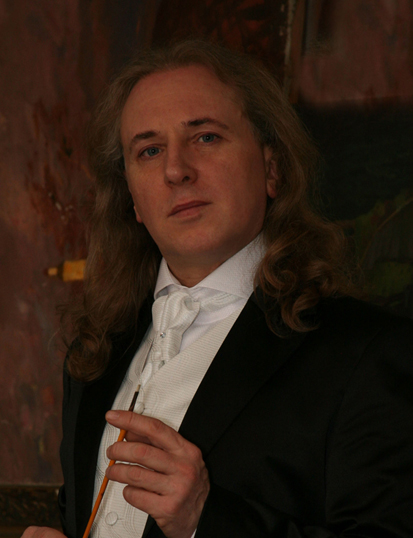
Nikolay Anokhin

Nikolay Yuryevich Anokhin (Russian: Никола́й Ю́рьевич Ано́хин), is a contemporary Russian artist from Moscow, born in 1966. He graduated from the Moscow Art School, and then from Surikov Moscow Art Institute. From 1988 to 1992 he took art courses from Members of the Russian Academy of Arts painters Aleksei Gritsai and Sergei Tkachev. Anokhin's works have been displayed at a number of exhibitions both in Russia and abroad. His younger brother Vladimir is also a classically trained painter.

Anokhin's style represents the evolution of the classic traditions of Russian painting, including elements of academic and traditional painting.

== Selected works ==
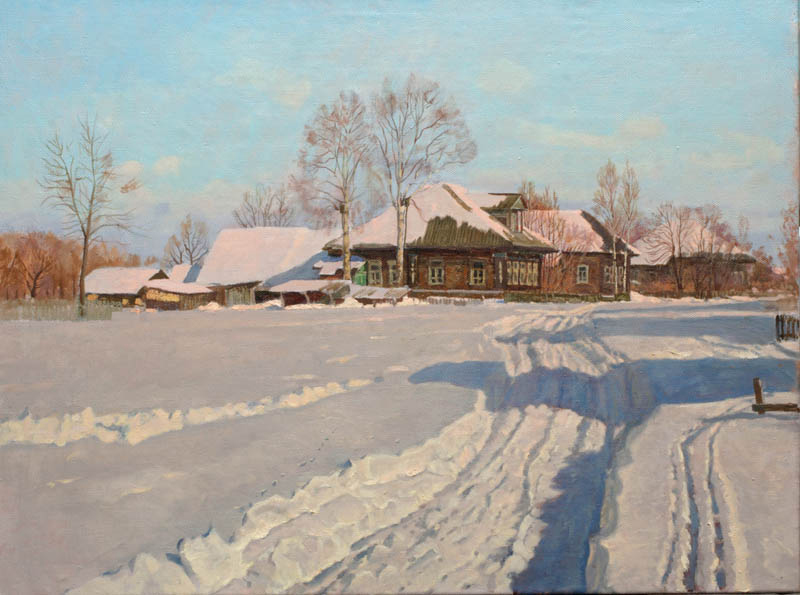
Anokhin, The Village

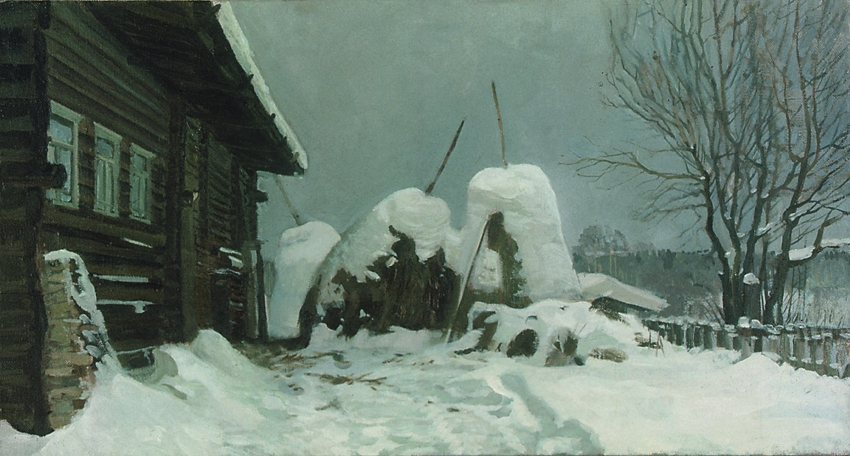
Anokhin, The Thaw, 1991

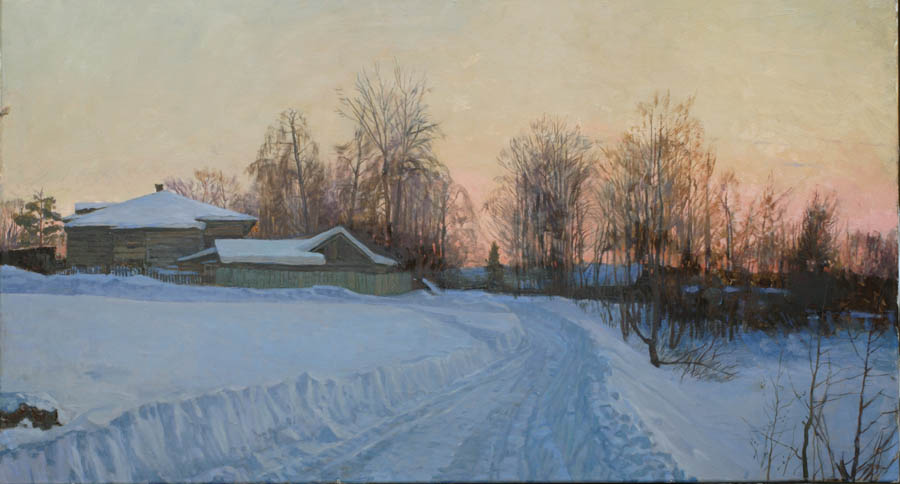
Anokhin, Evening

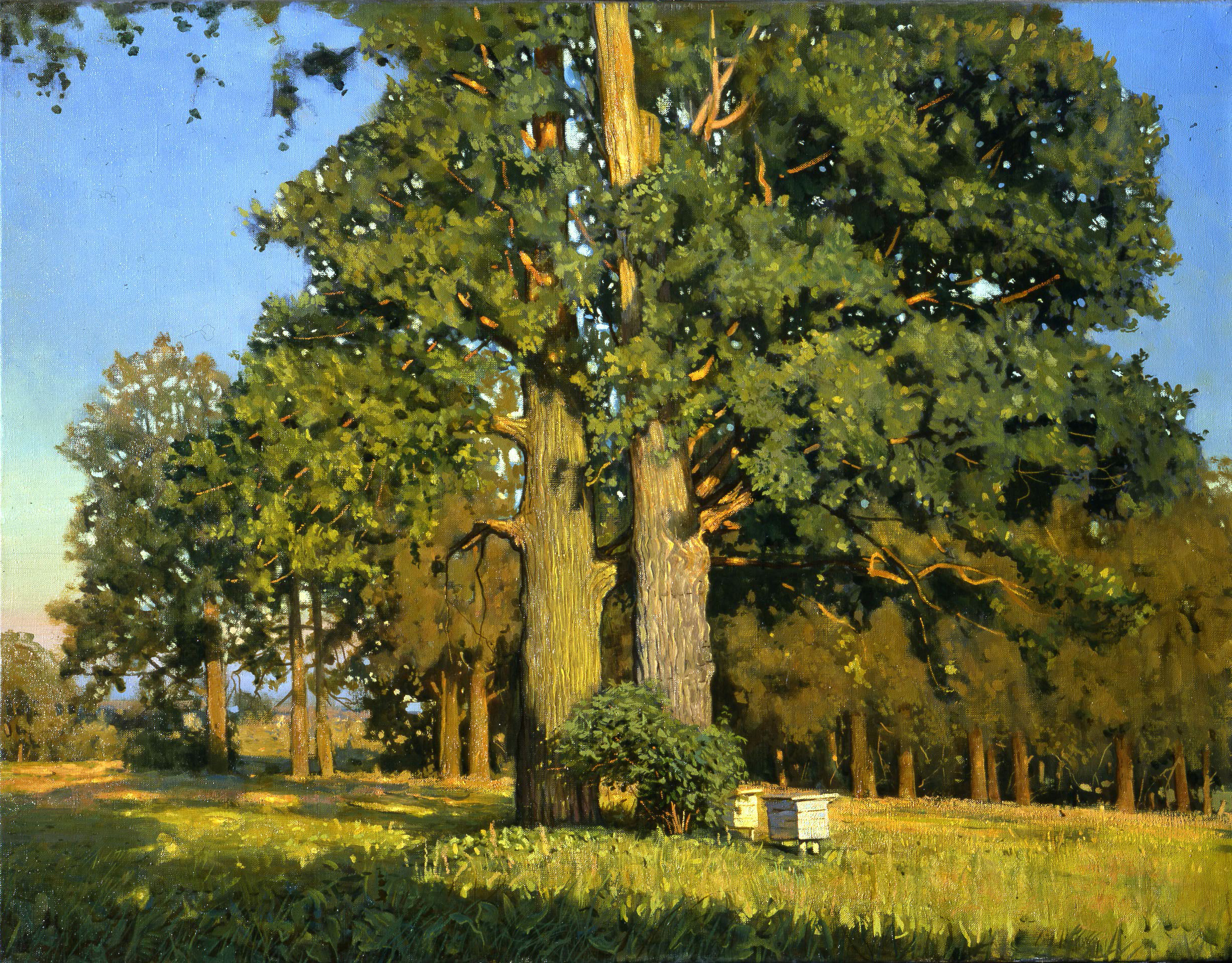
Anokhin, Old Oaks, 1999

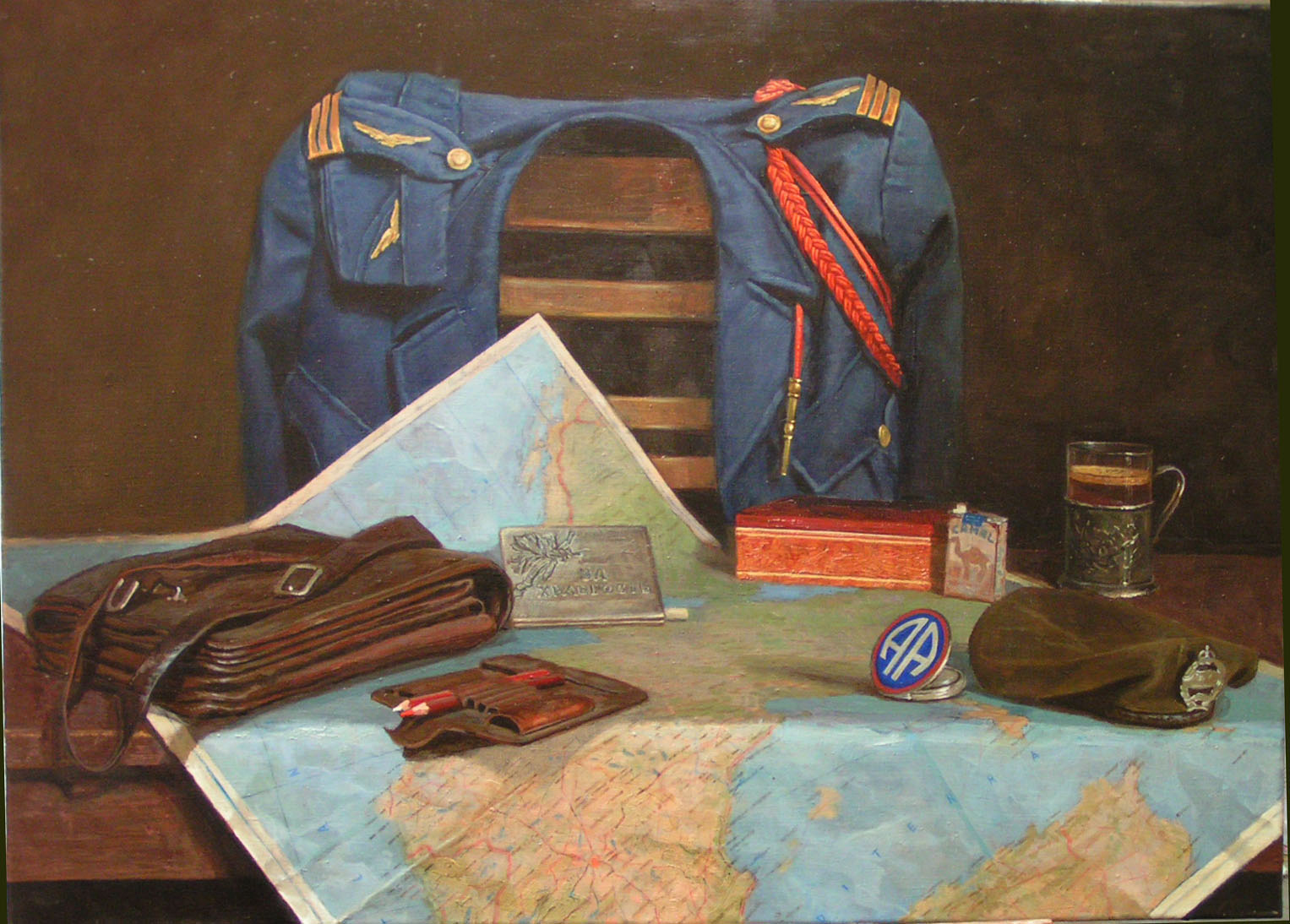
Anokhin, The Allies

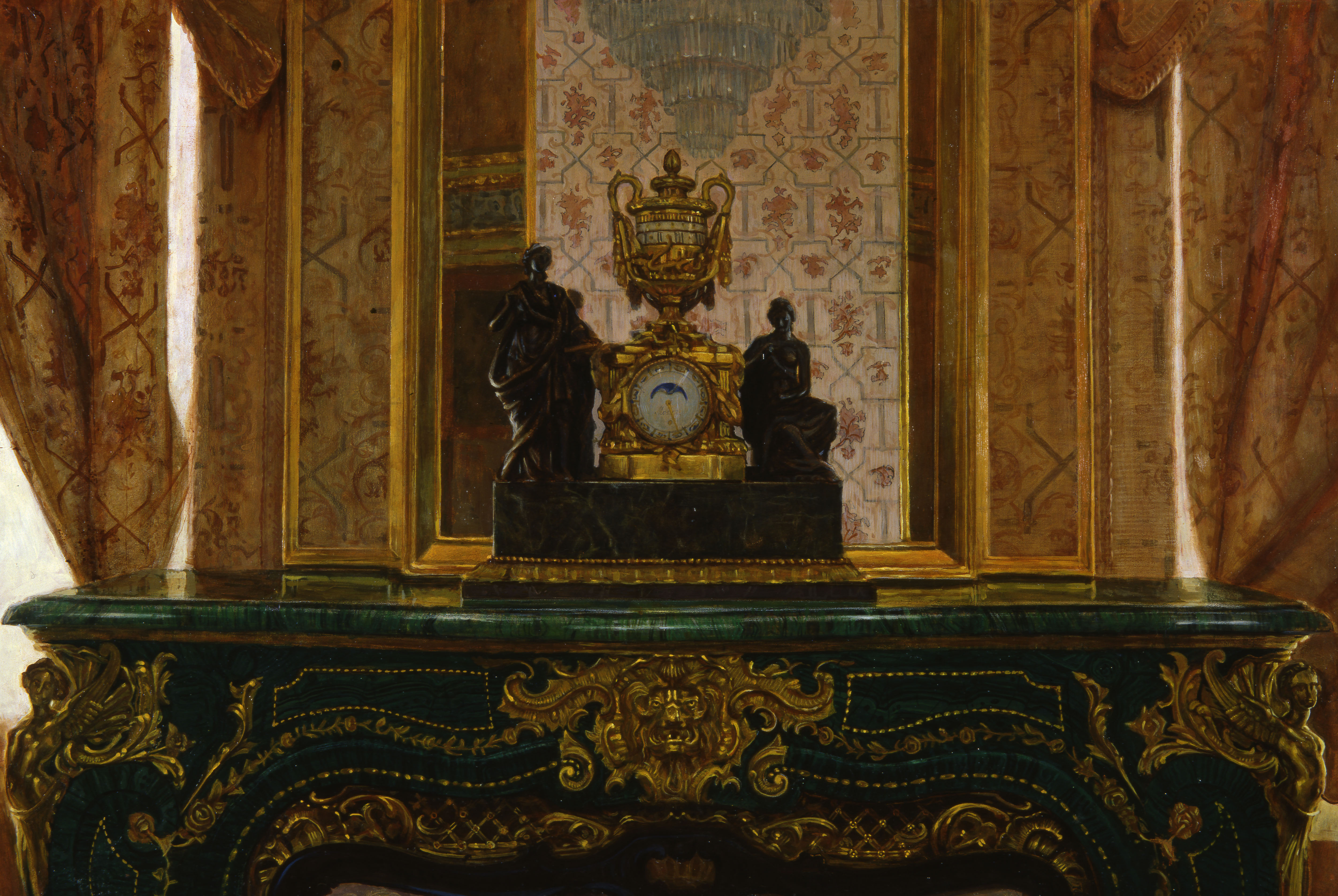
Anokhin, Empress's Fireplace

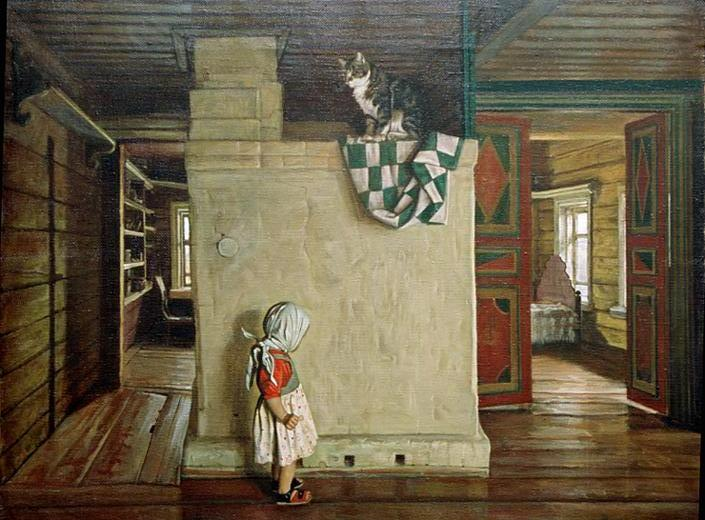
Anokhin, In the old house of Rakitinyh

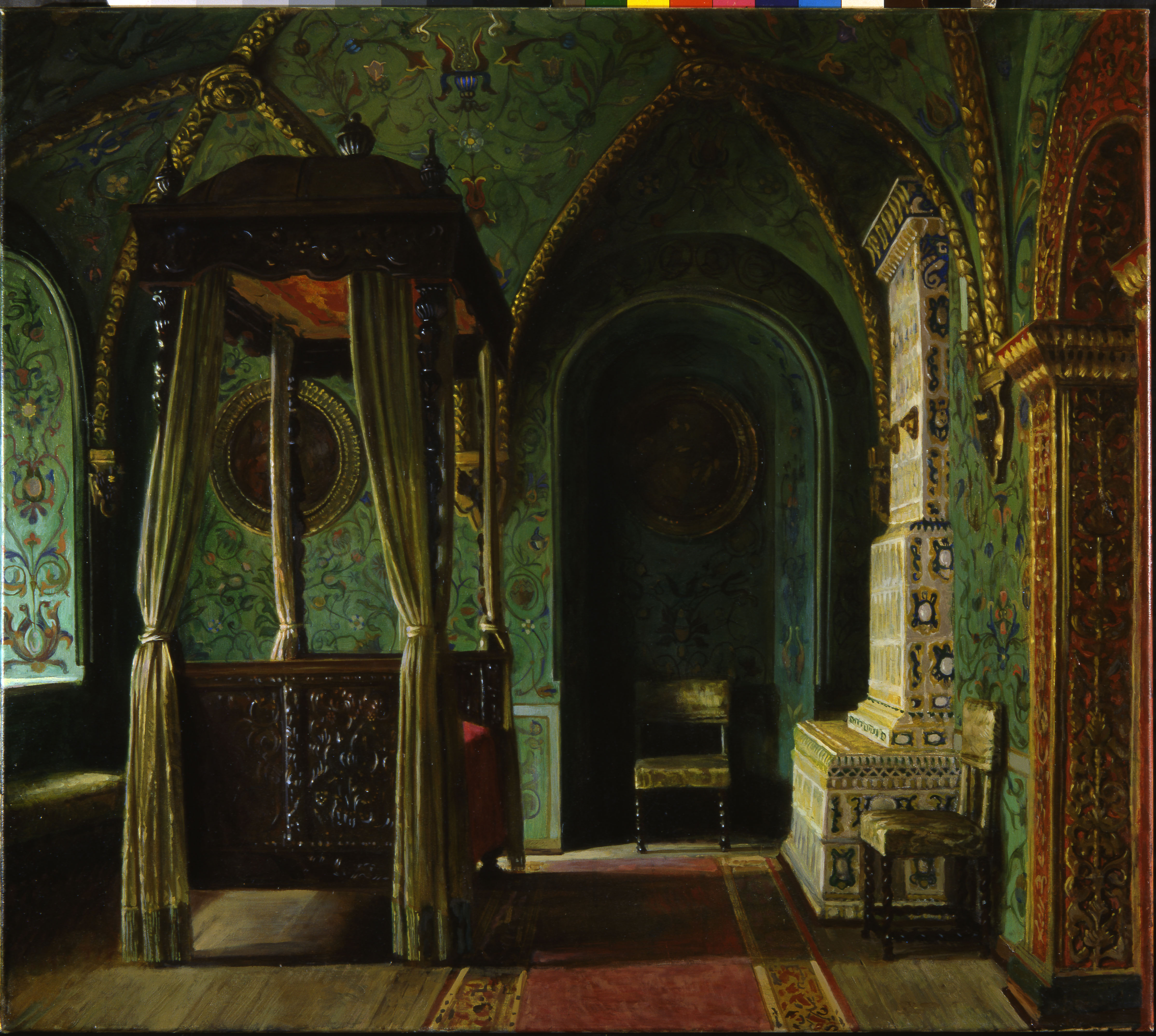
Anokhin, The Royal bedchamber

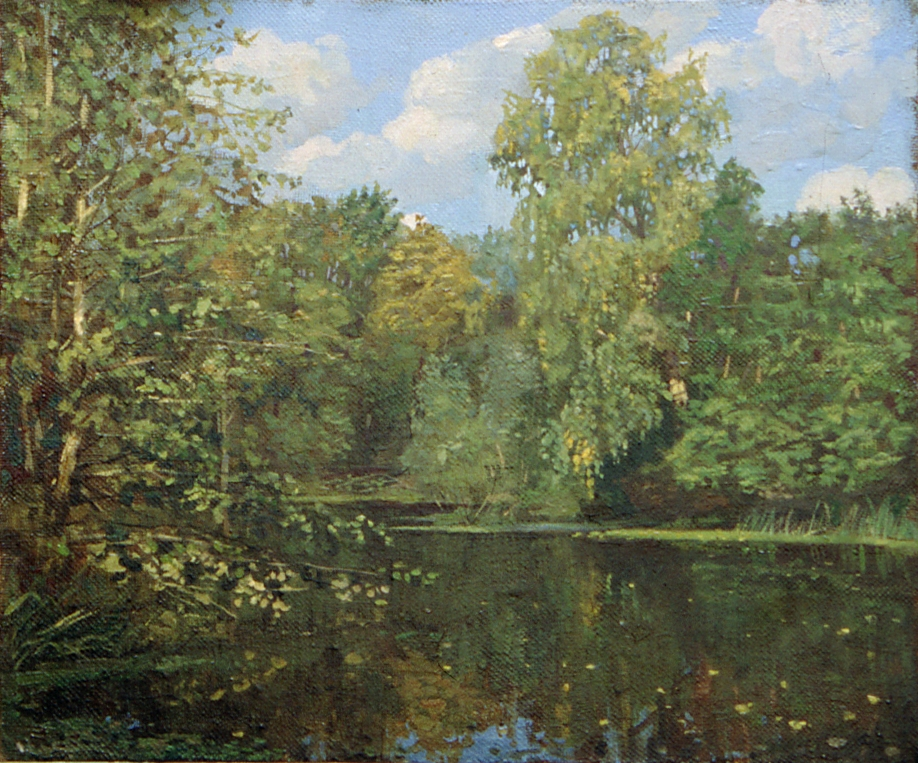
Barsky Pond, 2004

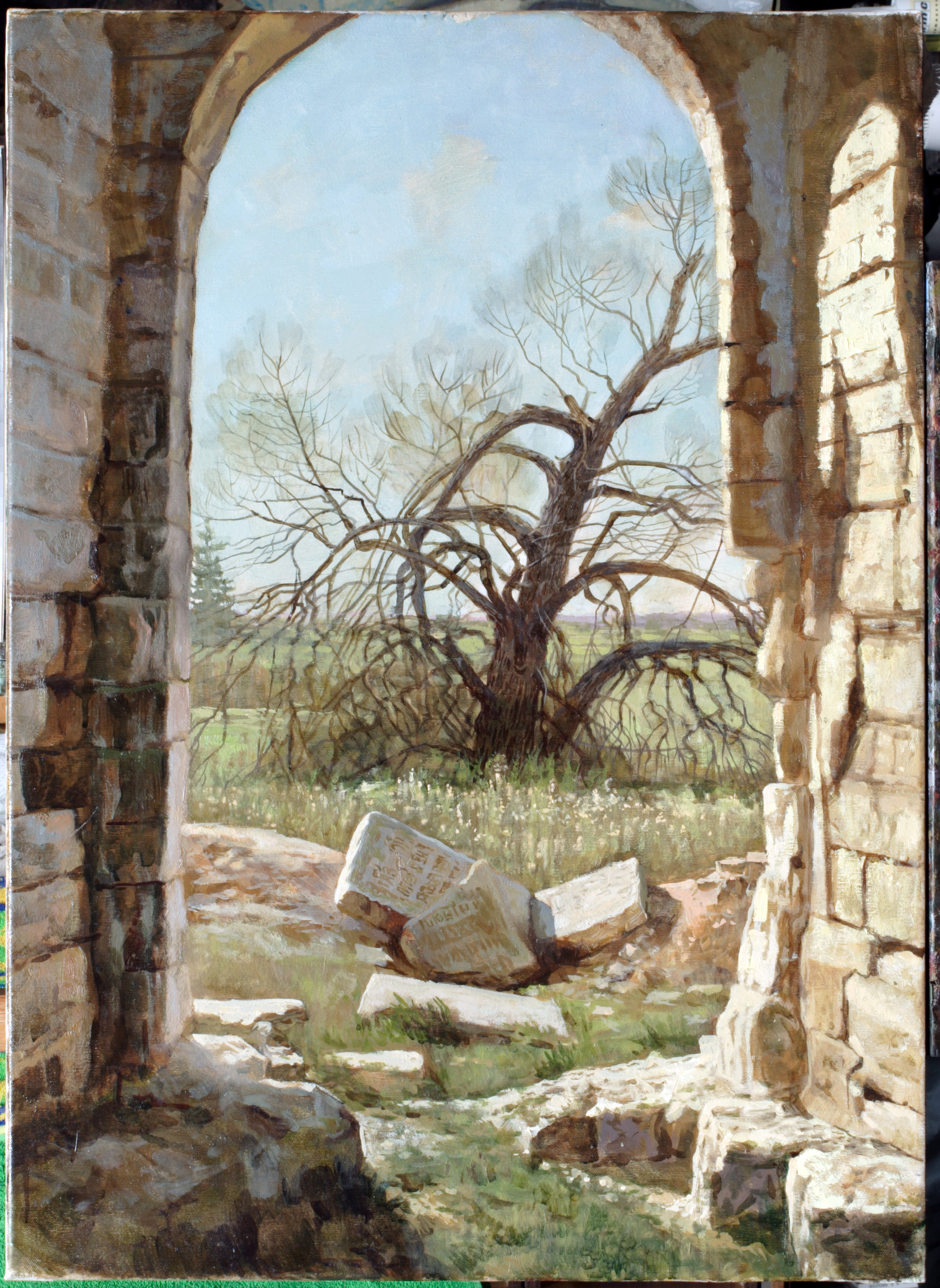
Chronos, 2007

== See also ==
- List of Russian artists
