= Rye (Shishkin) =

1878 painting of a Russian wheatfield

Rye Field
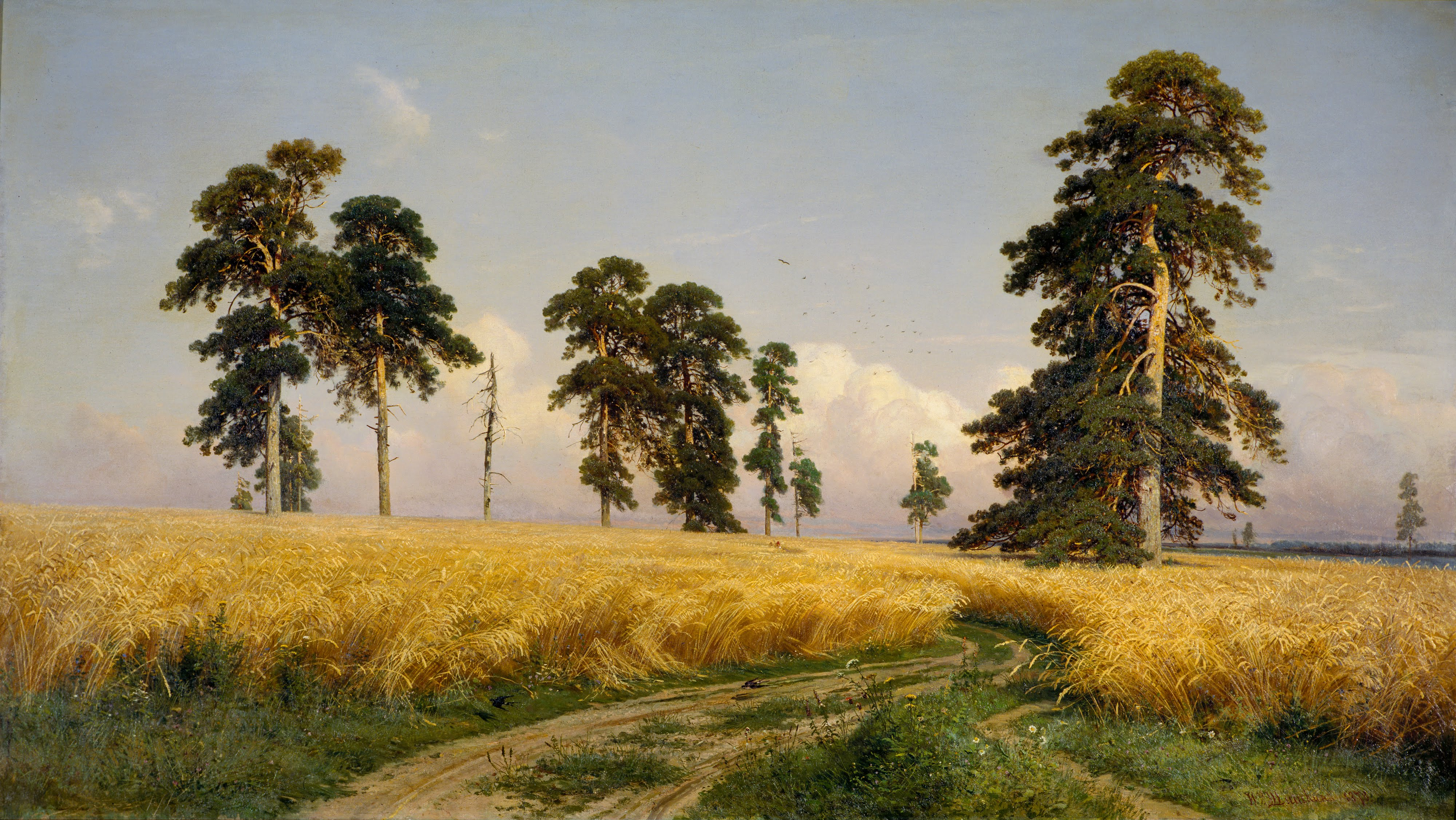
- Artist: Ivan Shishkin
- Year: 1878
- Medium: Oil on canvas
- Dimensions: 107 cm × 187 cm (42 in × 74 in)
- Location: Tretyakov Gallery, Moscow

Rye (Russian: Рожь), sometimes A Rye Field, is an oil painting finished in 1878 by the Russian painter Ivan Shishkin. It depicts a field of rye near the village of Lekarevo, west of Yelabuga in Tatarstan. It measures 107 cm × 187 cm (42 in × 74 in) and is held by the Tretyakov Gallery.

Shishkin was born in 1832 into a Russian merchant family in Yelabuga, then in Vyatka Governorate (today the Republic of Tatarstan), beside the Kama River some 200 km (120 mi) east of Kazan. As with many of his works, this painting draws from the countryside near his early home. It includes two common elements from Shishkin's work: pine trees, and a road leading away from the viewer. Two earlier works in the collection of the Tretyakov, made by Shishkin in the 1860s, show travellers among fields of rye.

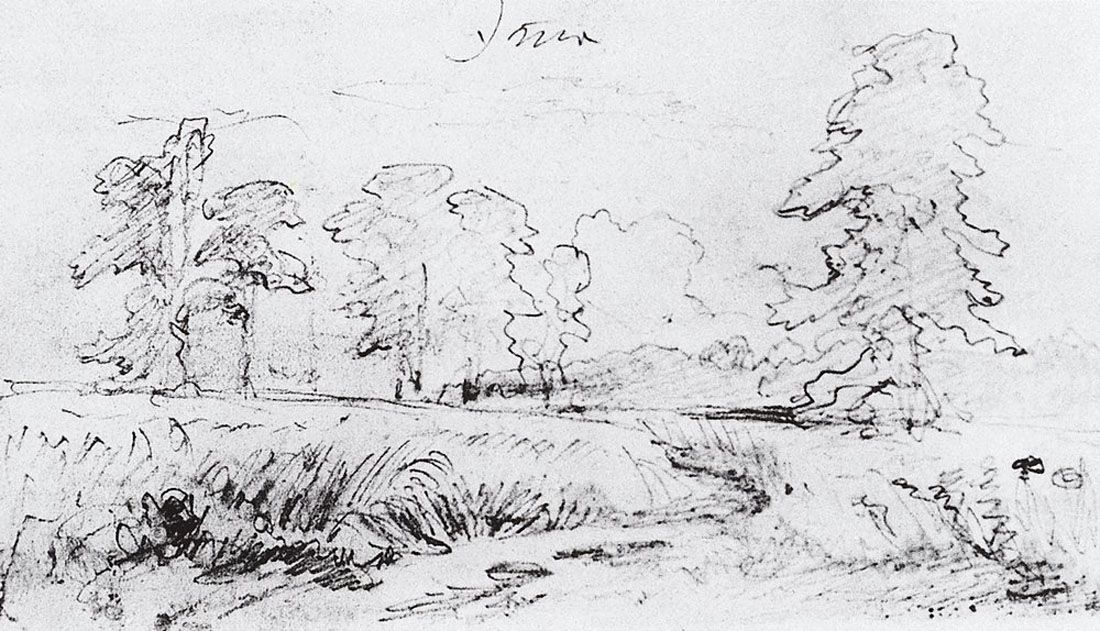
Pencil sketch, 1877

The work is based on a pencil sketch of a field of rye near Lekarevo, which the artist made during a trip with his daughter in 1877, on which he wrote "Эта" (Russian for 'this one'). Notes on another sketch reveal his thoughts: "Раздолье, простор, угодье. Рожь. Божья благодать. Русское богатство" ('Expanse, space, land. Rye. God's grace. Russian wealth')

The painting depicts a field of ripening yellow rye among scattered pine trees, ripening under a hazy blue summer sky, but with threatening clouds in the distance. A country track leads off into the field, with the tiny heads of two people barely visible amid the rye. A swallow swoops past the wildflowers beside the track. The large trees amid the crops are survivors of the forest cleared to make the field. The painting is signed and dated in the lower right corner, "И. Шишкинъ. 1878" ('I. Shishkin. 1878').

The completed work was exhibited at the sixth exhibition of the Peredvizhniki (Russian for 'the Wanderers') in 1878. It was bought that year by Pavel Tretyakov, whose collection has grown into the Tretyakov Gallery.

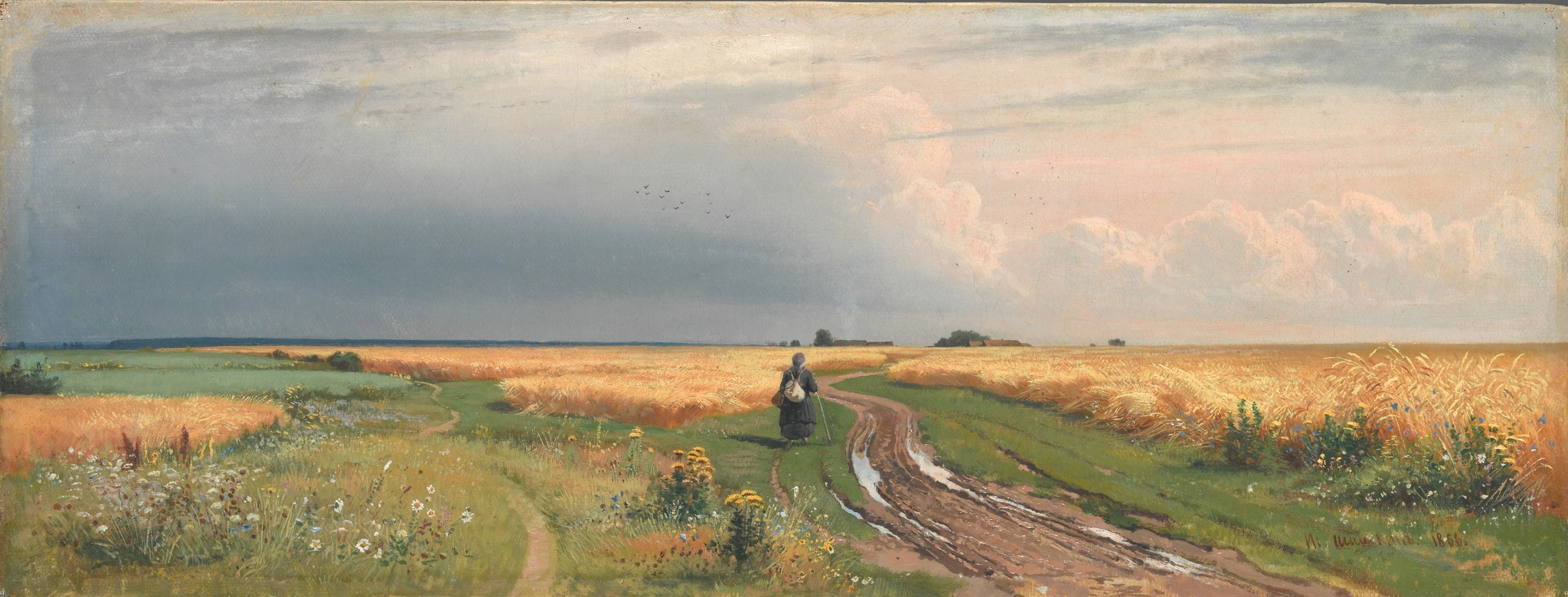
Ivan Shishkin, Дорога во ржи ('Road in rye'), 1866

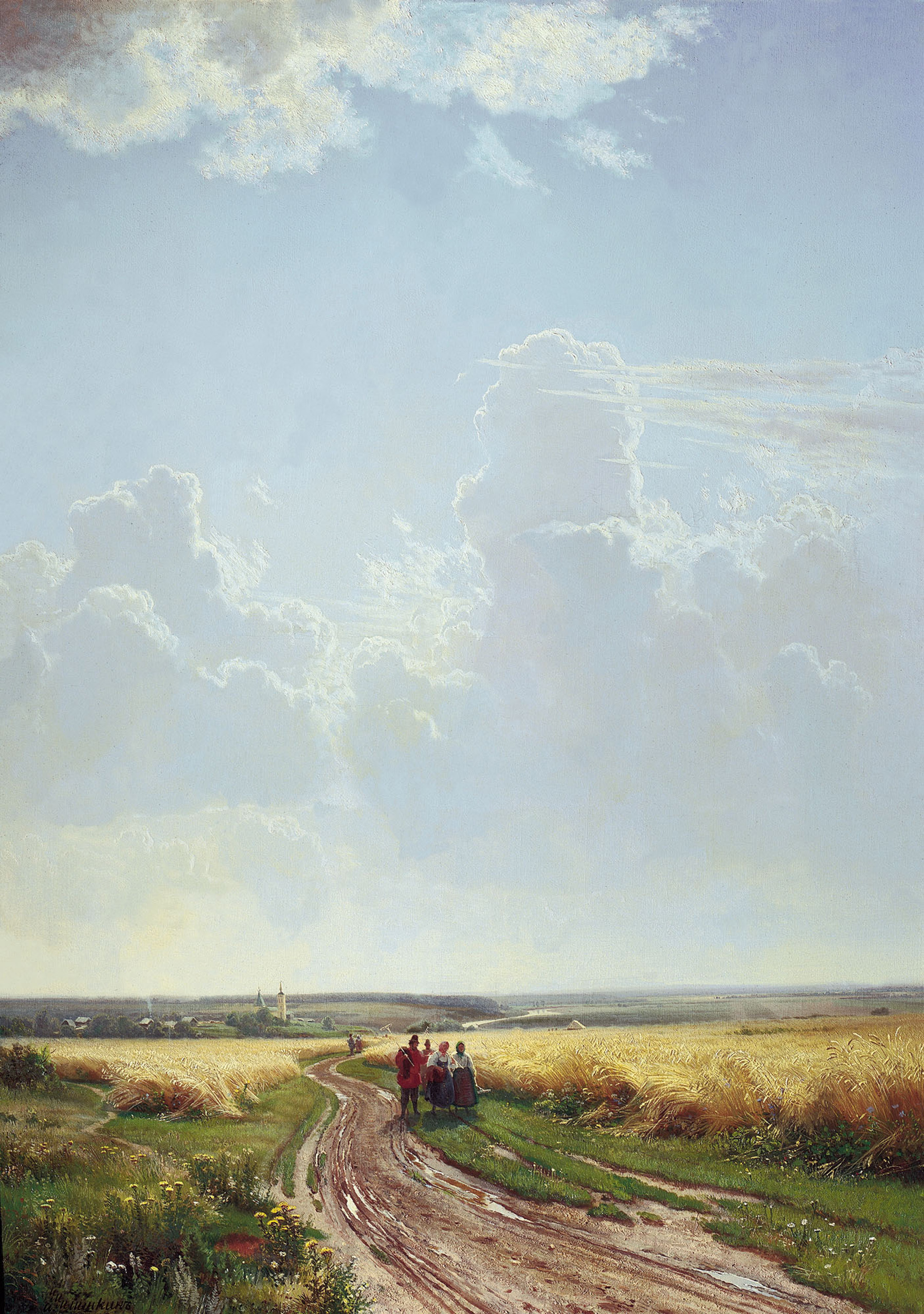
Ivan Shishkin, Полдень. В окрестностях Москвы ('Noon. Neighbourhood of Moscow'), 1869

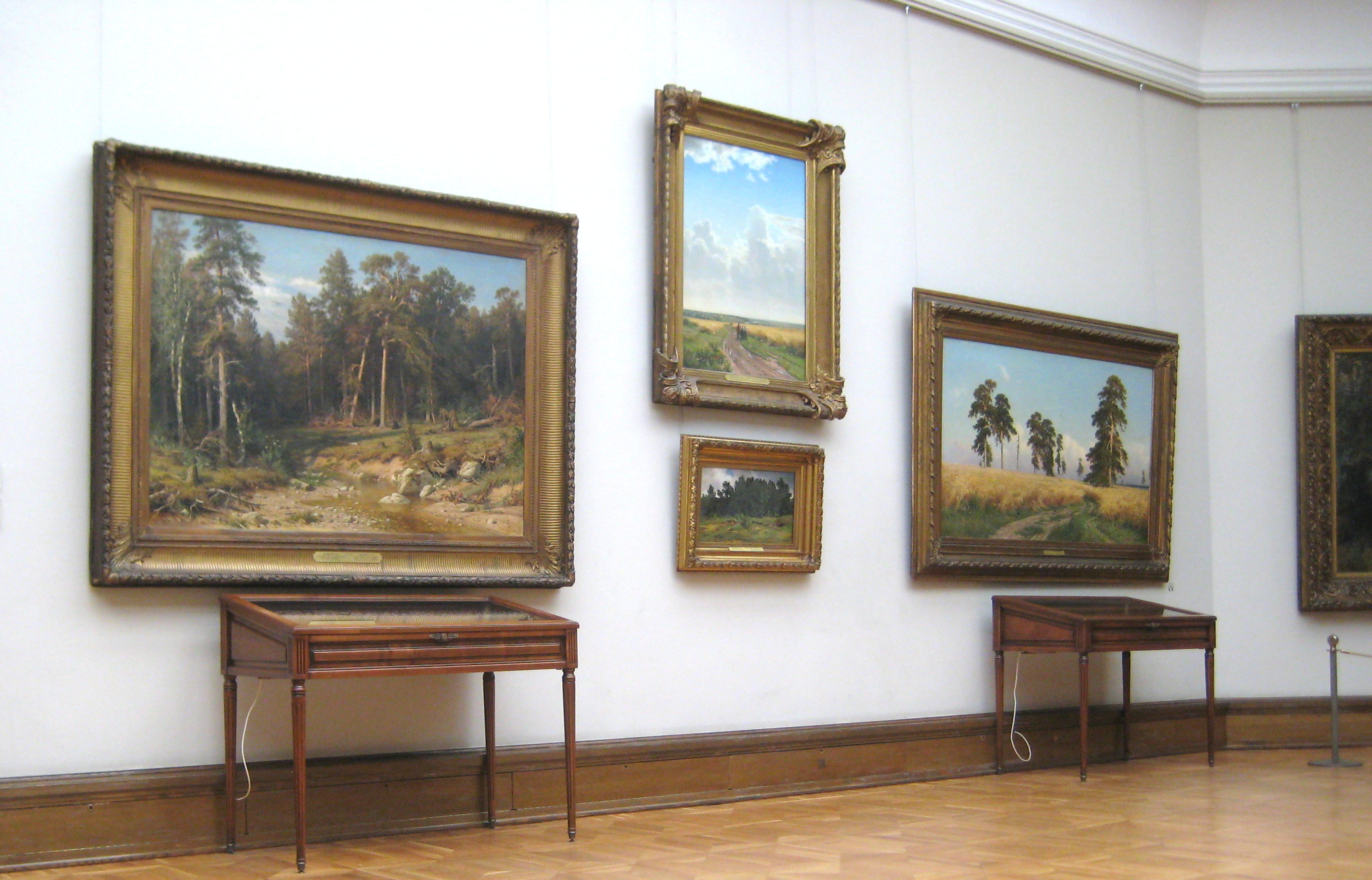
Shishkin's works in room N25 at the Tretyakov Gallery, including Rye to the right
