= Ekaterina Vorona =

Ekaterina Aleksandrovna Vorona
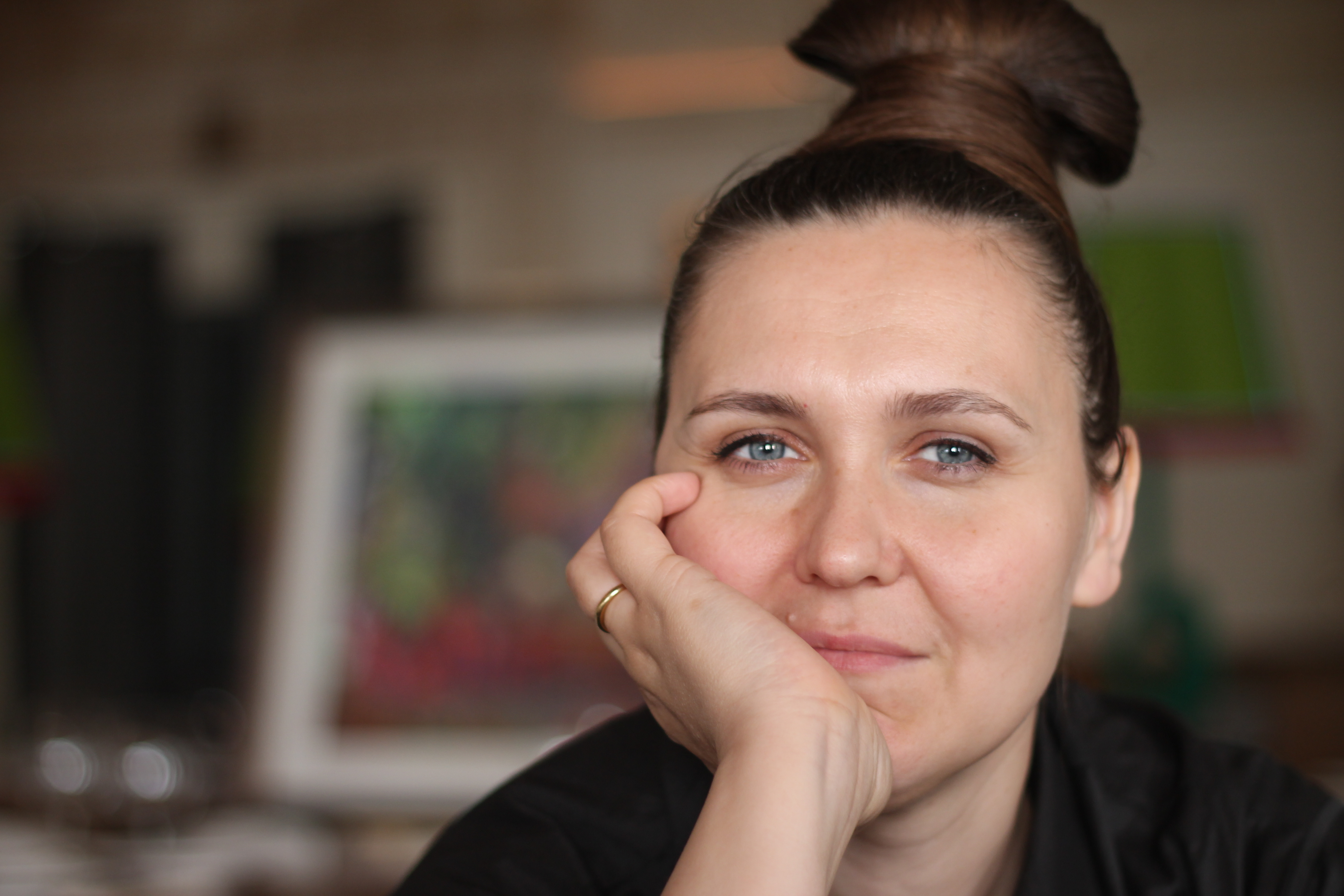
- Ekaterina Vorona
- Born: 21 December 1975 (age 50); Moscow, Russia, USSR
- Education: Graphic Arts Department of the Moscow State Pedagogical University
- Known for: Painter, sculptor
- Notable work: Skeleton of water 2014
- Movement: Honorary member of the Russian Academy of Arts
- Awards: Medal from the Russian Academy of Arts (2014)

Ekaterina Aleksandrovna Vorona (born 21 December 1975) is a Russian contemporary artist.

Vorona was born in the city of Fryazino, in the Moscow Oblast, Russia. She studied art and graphic design at the Moscow State Pedagogical University from 1993 to 1998. Vorona has been a member of the Moscow union of artists since 2009.

She was awarded a medal by the Russian Academy of Arts in 2014, and is an honorary member of the Russian Academy of Arts.

Vorona's works have been displayed in the collections of the Vatican Museum, the State Russian Museum, the State Historical Museum, the Russian cultural foundation, the Central Museum of the Great Patriotic War, among others, and her works are now held in private and corporate collections in Russia, Europe, China, and the United States.

Several catalogues of her works have been published in Russia.

== Selected exhibitions ==
=== 2019 ===
Solo exhibition, museum Palazzo Collicola. Spoleto (Italy).

Libres y decisivas. Artistas rusas, entre tradición y vanguardia, Collection del Museo Ruso. Malaga (Spain).

Solo exhibition «Dreamscape», Piazza di Pietra, 28. Rome (Italy).

=== 2018 ===
Solo exhibition «WORLD OF WATER», POP UP Museum.

Solo exhibition at the Smirnoff gallery.

Russische Kunst heute, Osthaus-Museum Hagen (Germany)

=== 2017 ===
Solo exhibition “Ekaterina Vorona. The Music of Water”.

=== 2016 ===
Solo exhibition, State Russian Museum

Solo exhibition, Moscow Gostiny Dvor

=== 2014 ===
Solo exhibition, Ministry of Culture of the Russian Federation

Solo exhibition, All Russia Decorative Arts Museum.
