= Sergei Lednev-Schukin =

Russian landscape and impressionist painter

Sergei Lednev-Schukin

Sergei Evgrafovich Lednev-Schukin (Russian: Серге́й Евгра́фович Леднев-Щукин; 1875–1961) was a Russian landscape and impressionist painter.

== Biography ==
Sergei was born 14 (26) August 1875 in Zaozerie, Yaroslavl Governorate, Russian Empire. He lived and worked most of his life in Moscow.

Group of Artists, Nezavisimye (Independent), 1911 (Lednev-Schukin, first at right side sitting)

He graduated from the Central Stroganov School of Technical Drawing in Moscow. He was a member of the Association World of Art (Mir Iskusstva), Group of artists Nezavisimye 1907–1912, Saint Petersburg Society of Artists, Member of Moscow Association Sreda. After the Russian revolution he participated in the 2nd National Exhibition of paintings in Moscow (1918–1919), he also participated in the exhibition of Combined Arts in 1925, in exhibitions of Artists Society Assembly 1924–1929 and Iskysstvo Trudyaschimsya 1925-1928. His paintings were exhibited in the State Tretyakov Gallery (1989), Khimki Art Gallery (1990), Primoe Picture Gallery Vladivostok, Novokuznetsk Art Museum, Kherson Museum of Art in Ukraine and several other Russian museums and overseas collections including the New York Metropolitan Museum of Art.

He died on 7 April 1961 in Moscow, USSR.

== Gallery ==
Russian church in snow, gouache and watercolor 40.6 x58.4 cm (from the collections of NY Metropolitan Museum)

Winter morning (Private Collection)

Livadia, Southern Landscape, oil 25.5 x 18 cm (Private Gallery)

Frosty morning at abbey gate, oil/board 26.5 x 37.4 cm (Private Collection, published in Sotheby's catalogue on 25th Nov 2008)

Chapel by the road Zvenigorod, oil/panel 38.6 x 51 cm (Private Collection)
