= Mechislav Dalkevich =

Russian artist and illustrator

- Born: April 2, 1861; Kamyanets-Podil'ska oblast’, Russian Empire
- Died: 1941; Leningrad, Soviet Union
- Education: Imperial Academy of Arts, Peter Clodt, Bogdan Willewalde
- Notable work: Illustrations to Dead Souls

Mechislav Mikhailovich Dalkevich (Russian: Мечислав Михайлович Далькевич; 1861–1941) was a Russian artist and illustrator.

== Biography ==
Mechislav Dalkevich was born in 1861 in Kamyanets-Podil'ska oblast’. He studied at the Imperial Academy of Arts under Peter Clodt von Jürgensburg and Bogdan Willewalde, receiving silver medals for his drawings and landscape art.

From 1878 to 1906 he worked as an illustrator in several magazines: Niva, Fragments, World Illustrations, Art Review, Dragonfly, and some others.

Mechislav Dalkevich was also a master of theatrical makeup. Since 1890 he taught drawing and makeup in the theater school at the Alexandrinsky Theatre and in private theater schools in Saint Petersburg. In 1916-1921 he was the head of makeup departments in the state theatres in Petersburg. Many of the theatrical makeup artists working in the USSR were his students.

He died in 1941 in Leningrad.

== Illustrations to Dead Souls ==
In 1900 the printing house of A.F. Marx published an anniversary edition of Gogol's Dead Souls containing 355 black-and-white illustrations. Mechislav Dalkevich was the main contributor and the art editor of this remarkable work.

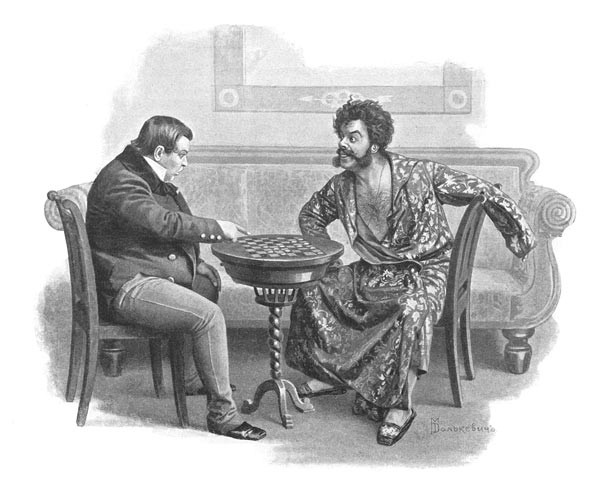
Chichikov and Nozdryov

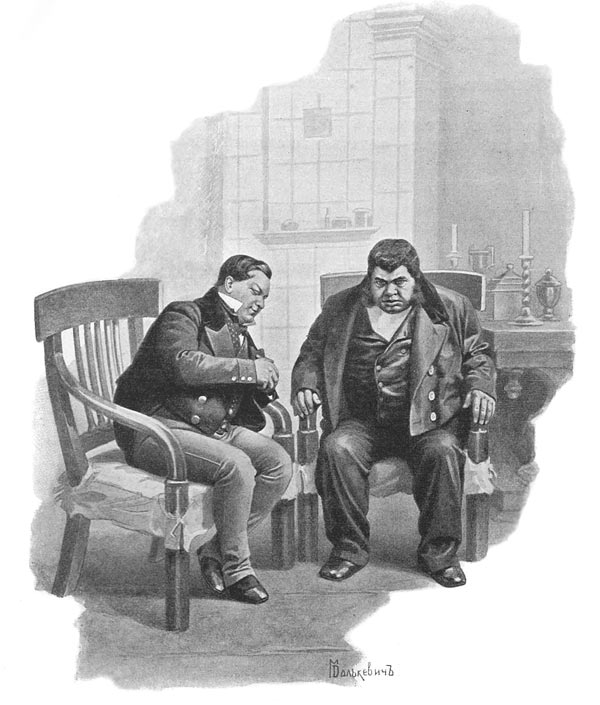
Chichikov and Sobakevich

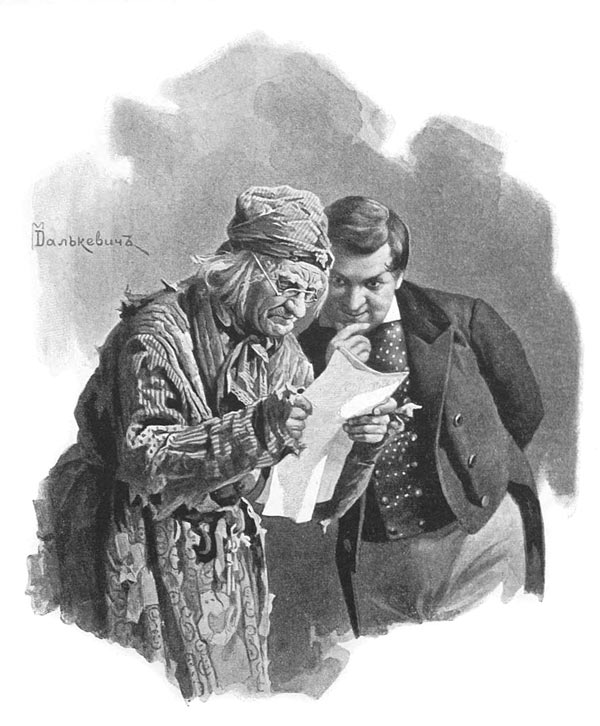
Chichikov and Plyushkin

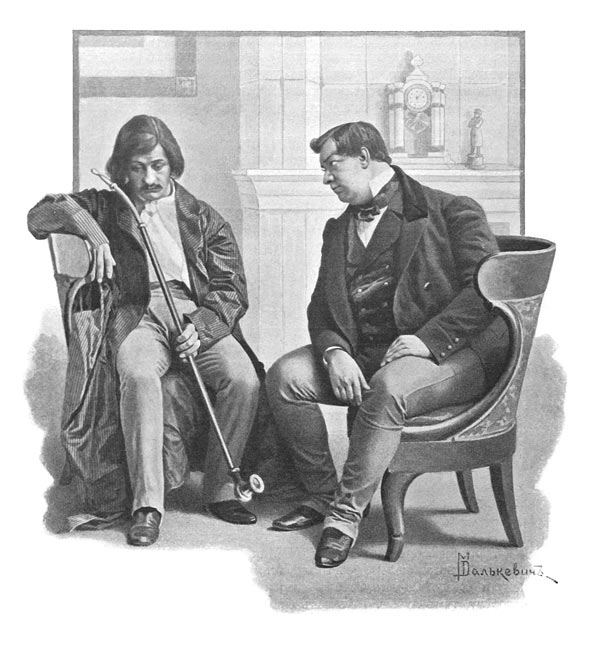
Chichikov and Tentetnikov

== Sources ==
- Art City (in Russian).
