= Yelena Anokhina =

Soviet diver (born 1947)

Personal information
- Nationality: Soviet
- Born: 17 January 1947 (age 78); Moscow, Russia

Sport
- Sport: Diving

Yelena Anokhina (born 17 January 1947) is a Soviet diver. She competed at the 1964 Summer Olympics and the 1968 Summer Olympics.
