= Longin Frikke =

Russian landscape painter (1820–1893)

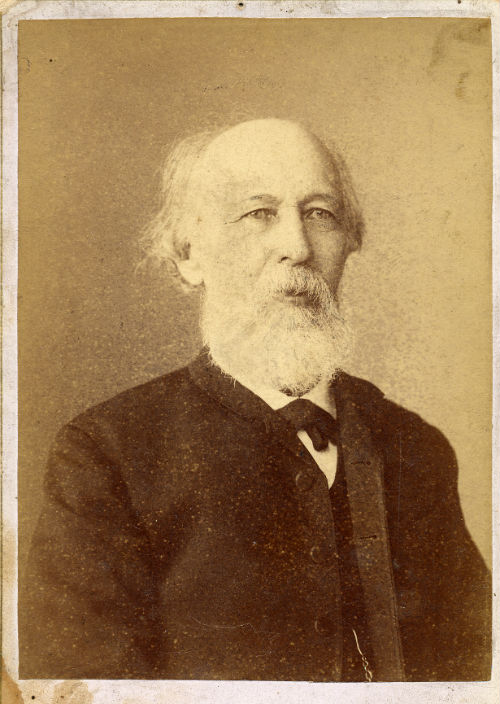
- Born: Longin Khristianovich Frikke; 30 December 1820; Gorodets, Russia
- Died: 9 September 1893 (aged 72); Novocherkassk, Russia
- Known for: Landscape painting
- Awards: Gold Medal of the Imperial Academy of Arts (1839)

Longin Khristianovich Frikke (Russian: Лонгин Христианович Фрикке; 30 December 1820 – 9 September 1893) was a Russian landscape painter.

Born into the family of an inspector at the Imperial Academy of Arts, Frikke took up studies at the academy and won plaudits and awards for his early work. He attracted the attention of the noble Alexander von Benckendorff, and was invited to produce studies of his estate. On his graduation, Frikke's success allowed him to travel to Europe to further his studies, and he spent a number of years in Italy. Returning to Russia, he was appointed a full academician of the Imperial Academy, and produced further works and held two exhibitions at the academy. He moved to his wife's home region in 1860, and painted local subjects, exhibiting them in Saint Petersburg in 1882.

Over his life, Frikke's works were collected by members of the Imperial family, and several tsars. Paintings by Frikke are now in the collections of the Tretyakov Gallery, and the Lermontov House Museum in Moscow, the Russian Museum in Saint Petersburg, and in regional museums in Krasnodar, Mykolaiv, Saratov, and at the Tver Regional Art Gallery, the Belarusian National Arts Museum, and the Museum of Don Cossacks. He is commemorated with monuments in Novocherkassk, where the house he lived in has been preserved.

== Career ==
=== Early life and studies ===
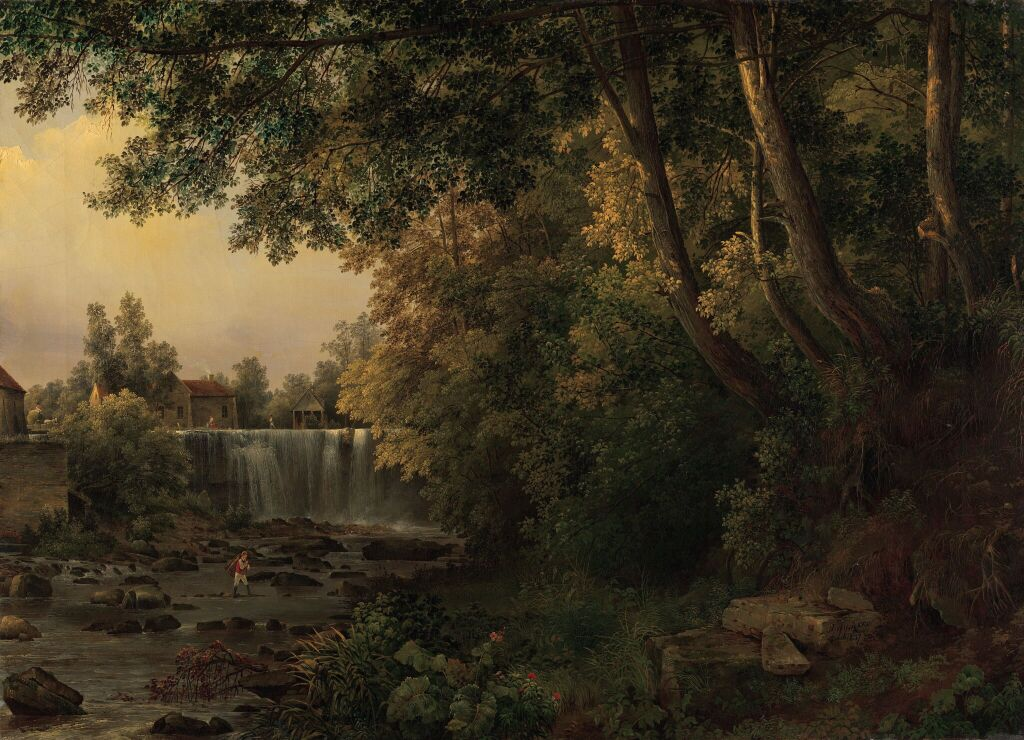
View of the Fal Estate of Count Benckendorff, Near Reval, 1837; Russian Museum

Frikke was born on 30 December 1820 in Gorodets, in what was then Balakhninsky Uyezd of Nizhny Novgorod Governorate in the Russian Empire. He was the son of an assistant class inspector at the Imperial Academy of Arts. Longin himself entered the Imperial Academy of Arts in 1833, studying under Maksim Vorobyov. His work received plaudits from the academy's council, and he was awarded its large silver medal in 1835, its small gold medal in 1837, and its large gold medal in 1839 for his View in the region of Dorpat, the year of his graduation. Recommended by the academy council to Alexander von Benckendorff, head of His Imperial Majesty's Own Chancellery, Benckendorff invited Frikke to his estate at Fal in 1836. Frikke produced several views of the estate, which went on to be exhibited.

Frikke then travelled abroad to study and refine his painting, visiting the Netherlands, Germany and Switzerland, and spending six years in Italy, where he studied and painted in and around Rome, Naples, Capri, Sicily, and Palermo. Frikke returned to Saint Petersburg in 1846, and was made an academician of the Imperial Academy the following year.

=== Russia and the Don ===
In Russia Frikke spent time in Moscow, and had private students. In 1852 he married Elizaveta Ivanovna Roller, the daughter of a landowner in the Don Host Oblast from Novocherkassk. Frikke only participated in two academy exhibitions, in 1854 and 1855, subsequently settling in Crimea in 1856 and continuing to paint subjects, including those of Crimean Tatars. In 1857 he worked on paintings for Grand Duchess Catherine Mikhailovna at her residence in Oranienbaum. Frikke moved to Novocherkassk in 1860, after the death of his father, but returned to Saint Petersburg in 1882 to exhibit twenty of his paintings on subjects related to the Don region. During his lifetime his works were acquired by members of the Imperial family, including Tsars Nicholas I and Alexander II.

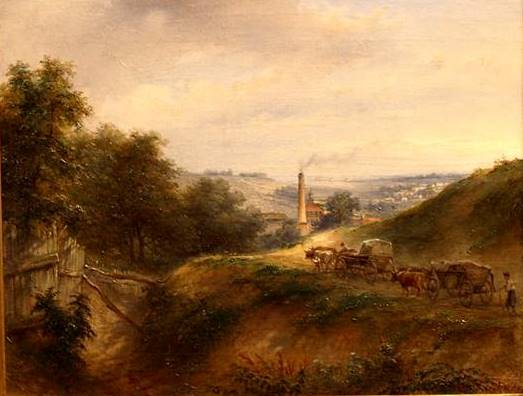
View of the surroundings of Novocherkassk, circa 1885

Frikke died in Novocherkassk on 9 September 1893. Frikke's entry in the Brockhaus and Efron Encyclopedic Dictionary notes that his paintings "are distinguished by the accuracy of the drawing and the correct transmission of linear perspective, but are conditional and sluggish in tones." Several of his paintings were acquired by museums and galleries, with his View of the Fal estate, near Revel displayed in the Museum of Emperor Alexander III in Saint Petersburg. His works are displayed in the Tretyakov Gallery, and the Lermontov House Museum in Moscow, the Russian Museum in Saint Petersburg, and in regional museums in Krasnodar, Mykolaiv, Saratov, and at the Tver Regional Art Gallery, the Belarusian National Arts Museum, and the Museum of Don Cossacks in Novocherkassk.

Frikke's two-storey mansion at No. 66 Platovsky Prospekt in Novocherkassk has been preserved, with a memorial plaque to Frikke unveiled on the building on 27 December 2005. In 2017 a memorial to Frikke was placed on Platovsky Avenue, opposite the building where he had lived. On 21 May 2012, the city administration of Novocherkassk announced that one of the city streets would be renamed after Frikke.

== Sources ==
- "Фрикке, Лонгин Христианович" . Brockhaus and Efron Encyclopedic Dictionary (in Russian). 1906.
