= The Swan Princess (painting) =

1900 painting by Mikhail Vrubel

- Царевна-Лебедь (Russian)
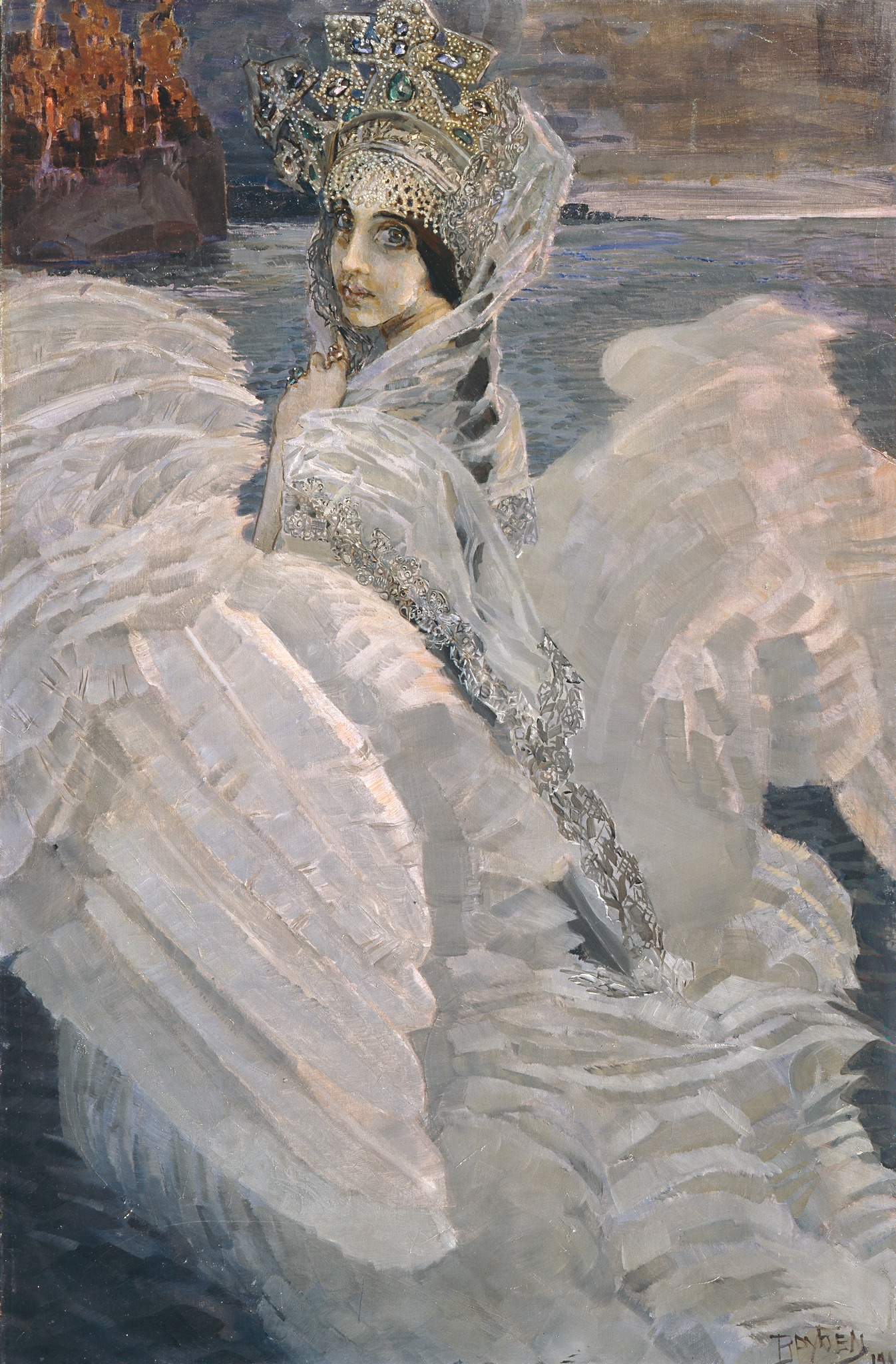
- Artist: Mikhail Vrubel
- Year: 1900
- Medium: Oil on canvas
- Dimensions: 142.5 cm × 93.5 cm (56.1 in × 36.8 in)
- Location: Tretyakov Gallery; Moscow, Russia

The Swan Princess (Russian: Царевна-Лебедь) is a 1900 oil painting (oil on canvas) by the Russian artist Mikhail Vrubel. It is based on the opera The Tale of Tsar Sultan by Rimsky-Korsakov (which was based on the fairytale of the same name by Pushkin). Vrubel designed the decor and costumes for this opera. The part of the Swan Princess was performed by his wife, Nadezhda Zabela-Vrubel.

== History ==
Vrubel drew inspiration for this piece from a Savva Mamontov private opera that premiered on 21 December 1900. Vrubel was the costume designer for the opera, while his wife played the part of the Swan Princess. However, the face of the Swan Princess in the painting does not resemble that of his spouse, as evidenced by a photo taken at the time the opera was shown.

The art critic Nikolai Prakhov opined that the painting drew upon the likeness of his sister, Elena Prakhov. It is possible that Vrubel combined the likeness of Elena and his wife, or an unknown lover. The artist painted this piece at the farm of his parents in Chernigov Governorate (present-day Ukraine), in the summer of 1900.

== Gallery ==
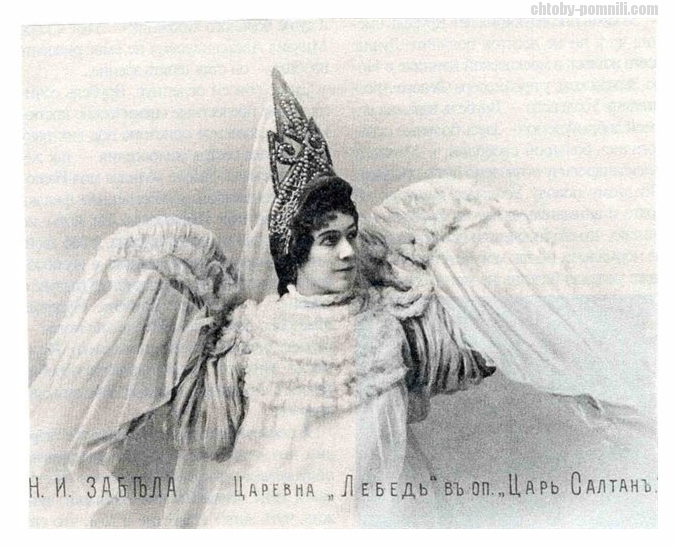
Nadezhda Zabela-Vrubel as the Swan Princess

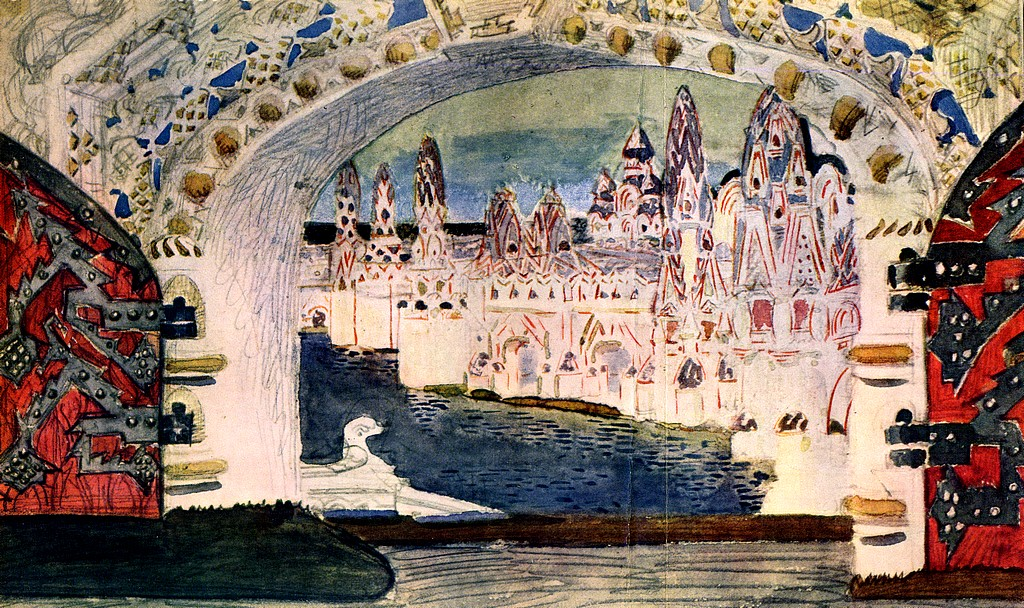
The city of Ledenets in Vrubel's set decor
