= Gennady Pasko =

Russian impressionist painter (born 1940)

Gennady (also Gennadii) Ivanovich Pasko (born 26 October 1940, Sukhumi) is a Russian impressionist painter.

== Education ==
Pasko finished Batumi art school in 1959.

He graduated from the faculty of applied art (decorative arts) of the Moscow Textile Institute in 1965.

== Recognition ==
Pasko is the people's artist of Russia for 1995.

He was awarded a Diploma of the Russian Academy of Arts in 2001.
