= Ilyas Phaizulline =

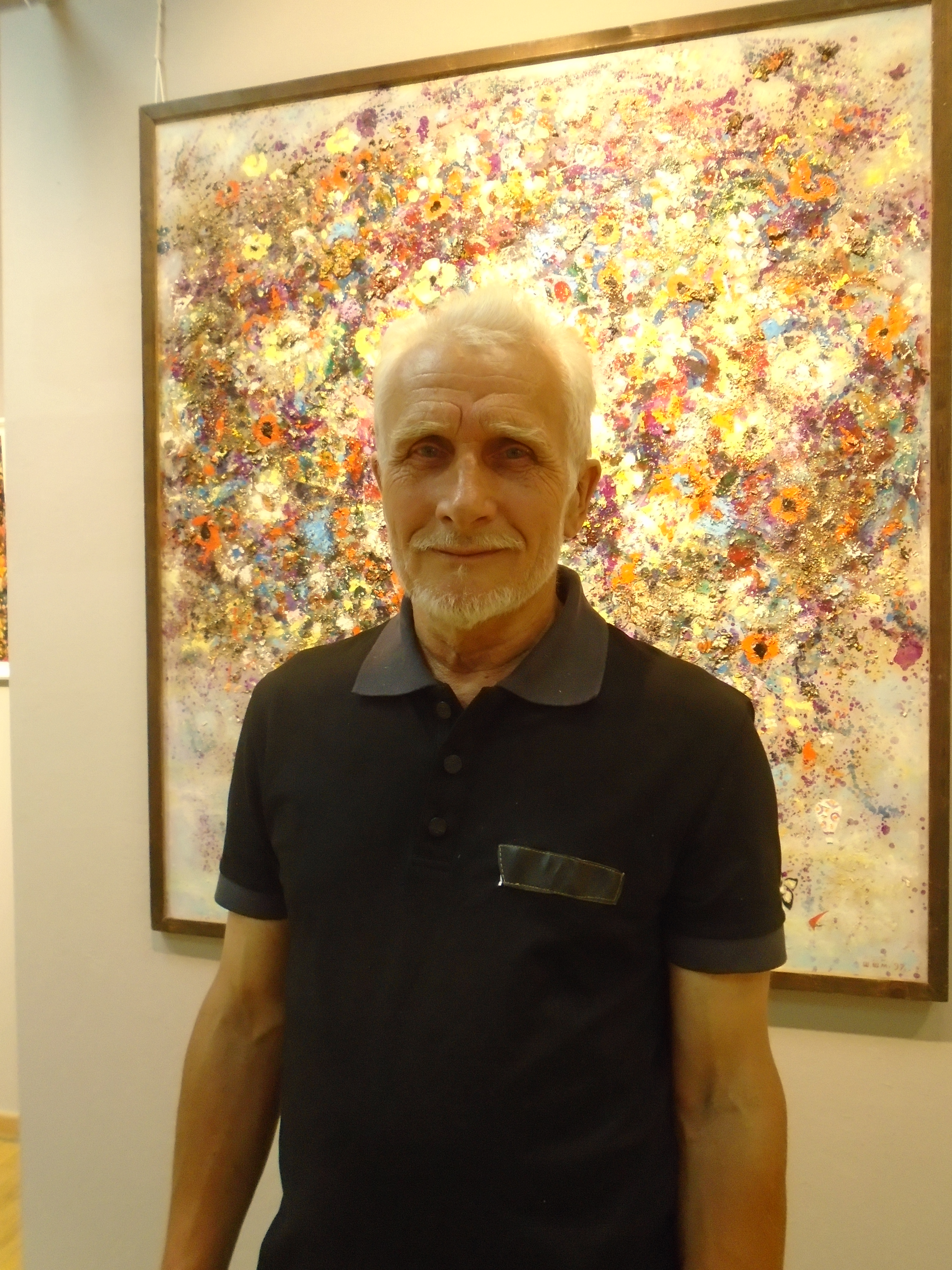
Ilyas Fayzullin in 2022

Ilyas Phaizulline (Russian: Ильяс Фәйзуллин; born August 15, 1950, in Tetyushi, on the Volga River) is an artist from Russia.

He is a painter and draughtsman. Also he is a member of Union of Arts of Russia and A.I.A.P. UNESCO. He lives in Kazan.

After finishing a musical-art-pedagogical secondary school in 1970, he attended the I. E. Repin State Academic Institute for Painting, Sculpture and Architecture in St. Petersburg.

Phaizulline lives and works from the city of Kazan, Russia where some of his works are permanently displayed in the National Museum of Tatarstan Republic. His art is principally that of a classical realist and maintain the same techniques and standards of the Old Masters and mentors such as Velasquez, Da Vinci, and Michelangelo. In this gallery, you will find more than one hundred representations of work from his early period until the present.

Artworks by Ilyas Phaizulline can be found in private collections of Spain, Italy and England. Some of his historical artworks were purchased by the Russian Ministry of Culture for exposition in the National Museum of Tatarstan Republic. Several paintings were purchased for the Kazan Kremlin.
