= Sergei Anokhin (footballer) =

Russian professional football player

Personal information
- Full name: Sergei Nikolayevich Anokhin
- Date of birth: 15 March 1981 (age 45)
- Place of birth: Kaluga, Russian SFSR
- Height: 1.76 m (5 ft 9 1/2 in)
- Position: Forward

Youth career
- Smena Kaluga
- Torpedo Kaluga

Senior career*
Years	Team	Apps	(Gls)
1999–2003	FC Lokomotiv Kaluga	169	(31)
2004–2006	FC Vityaz Podolsk	86	(31)
2006	FC Metallurg-Kuzbass Novokuznetsk	12	(5)
2007–2010	FC Vityaz Podolsk	116	(28)
2010	→ FC Avangard Kursk (loan)	15	(2)
2011	FC Metallurg-Kuzbass Novokuznetsk	8	(0)
2011–2017	FC Kaluga	122	(28)
- * Club domestic league appearances and goals

Sergei Nikolayevich Anokhin (Russian: Серге́й Николаевич Анохин; born 15 March 1981) is a Russian former professional football player.

== Club career ==
He played 3 seasons in the Russian Football National League for FC Vityaz Podolsk and FC Avangard Kursk.
