= 1925 in art =

Events from the year 1925 in art.

== Events ==
- February 23 – Stanley Spencer marries Hilda Carline.
- March 31 – The Bauhaus closes in Weimar and moves to Dessau.
- April–October – In Paris, the Ministry of Commerce and Industry sponsors the International Exposition of Modern Industrial and Decorative Arts; the event gives a name to the Art Deco style. Le Corbusier's Pavillon d'Esprit Nouveau is so disliked by the organizers that they erect a six-meter-high fence around it.
- May 4 – The Royal Academy Exhibition of 1925 opens at Burlington House in London
- May 9 – Josef Albers marries Anni Fleischmann.
- September 17 – Frida Kahlo is seriously and permanently injured when a bus in which she is riding collides with a trolleycar in Mexico City; she takes up painting while immobilized following the accident.
- Autumn – Alfred Stieglitz and Georgia O'Keeffe move to an upper-floor apartment in the Shelton Towers Hotel, New York City from where they begin to photograph and paint the views. This year also, Stieglitz begins taking his Equivalents series of abstract cloud photographs.
- November 13/14 (midnight) – First Surrealist exhibition opens at the Galerie Pierre, Paris.
- Franz Roh's Nach Expressionismus – Magischer Realismus: Probleme der neuesten europäischen Malerei ("After Expressionism – Magical Realism: Problems of the newest European painting") is published, introducing the term magic realism into cultural criticism.

== Awards ==
- Archibald Prize: John Longstaff – Portrait of Maurice Moscovitch

== Works ==
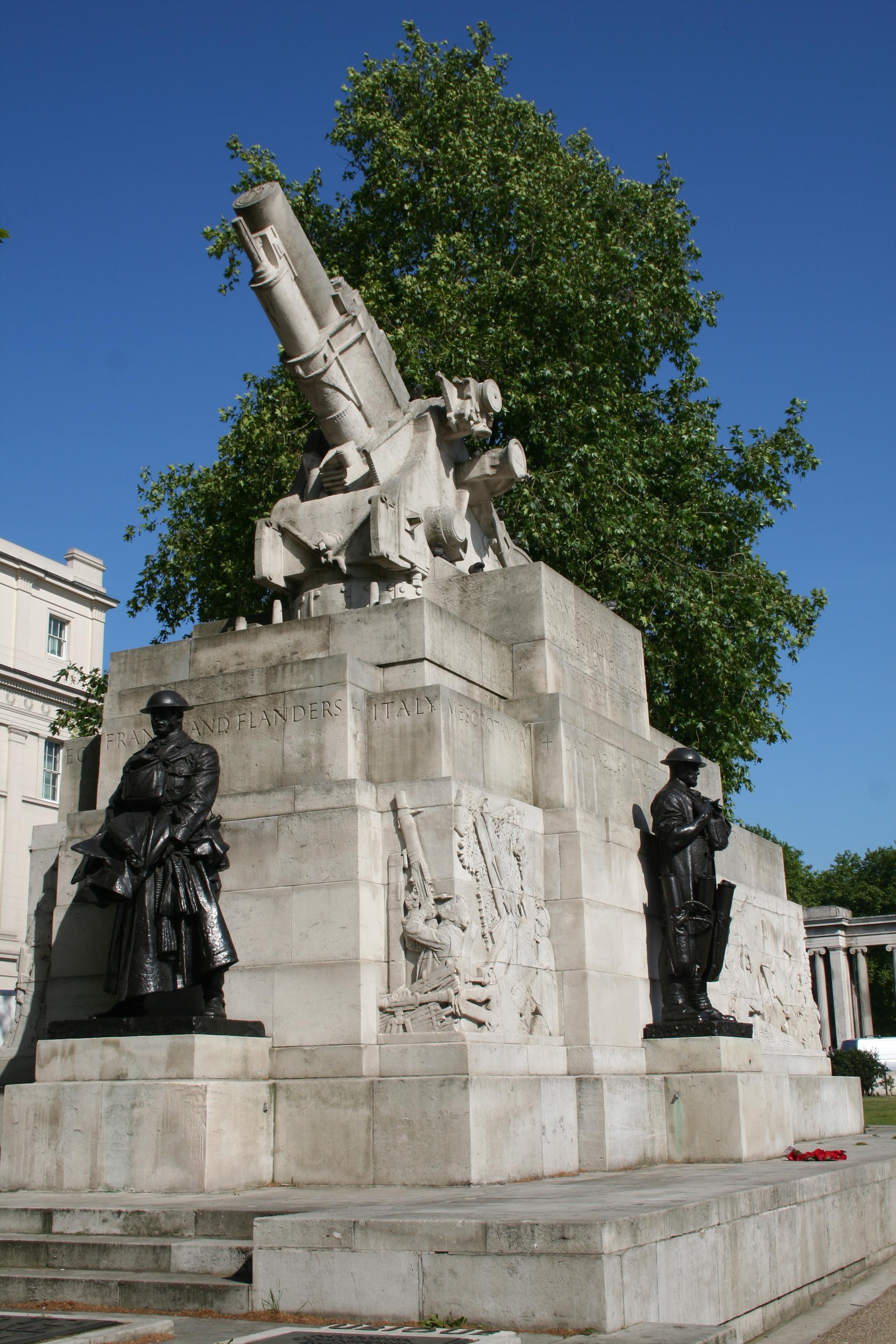
C.S. Jagger – Royal Artillery Memorial

=== Paintings ===
- George Adomeit – Down to the Harbor
- Pierre Bonnard – Nude at the Toilet Table
- Henry Clive – Sultana (approximate year)
- Lovis Corinth – Ecce homo
- Salvador Dali
  - Portrait of My Father
  - Young Woman at a Window
- Otto Dix – Portrait of the Dancer Anita Berber
- Arthur Dove – The Critic
- Lyonel Feininger – Barfüßerkirche in Erfurt I (Staatsgalerie Stuttgart)
- Rudolf Frentz – Horsewoman
- George Grosz – Portrait of the Writer Max Herrmann-Neisse
- Edward Hopper
  - House by the Railroad
  - The Bootleggers
- Wassily Kandinsky
  - Yellow-Red-Blue
  - Three Elements
- Paul Klee – Fish Magic
- Tamara de Lempicka – Autoportrait (Tamara in a Green Bugatti)
- Joan Miró
  - Head of a Catalan Peasant (sequence completed)
  - The Birth of the World
  - The Harlequin's Carnival
- C.R.W. Nevinson – A Studio in Montparnasse
- Hilda Rix Nicholas – Les fleurs dédaignées
- Pablo Picasso
  - The Three Dancers
  - The Three Graces
- Veno Pilon – Russian Woman
- Georg Schrimpf – Martha Reading a Letter
- Charles Sheeler – Still Life
- Alexej von Jawlensky – Abstract Head: Desire
- Xu Beihong – Jiang Biwei by a table

=== Sculptures ===
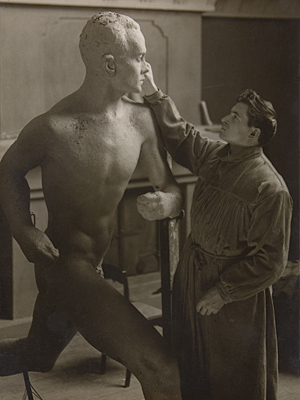
Aaltonen works on the statue of Nurmi

- Wäinö Aaltonen – Statue of Paavo Nurmi
- Josep Clarà – Serenity
- Jacob Epstein – Rima (memorial to W. H. Hudson in Hyde Park, London)
- Emmanuel Frémiet – Equestrian statue of Joan of Arc (Portland, Oregon)
- Daniel Chester French – Statue of Abraham Lincoln (Lincoln Memorial, Washington, D.C.)
- Alberto Giacometti – Torso
- Charles Sargeant Jagger – Royal Artillery Memorial
- Paul Manship – Actaeon, Diana, and The Flight of Europa
- Frederick Roth – Statue of Balto, Central Park
- Francis Derwent Wood – Machine Gun Corps Memorial

== Births ==
- 1 January
  - Mario Merz, Italian artist (d. 2003).
  - Kossa Bokchan, Serbian painter (d. 2009).
- 17 January – Duane Hanson, American sculptor (d. 1996).
- 23 January – James Bingham, Northern Irish painter (d. 2009).
- 12 February – Joan Mitchell, American Abstract Expressionist painter (d. 1992).
- 22 February – Edward Gorey, American illustrator (d. 2000).
- 10 March – Ed van der Elsken, Dutch photographer (d. 1990).
- 13 March – Jane Bown, English portrait photographer (d. 2014).
- 25 March - José Manuel Capuletti (d. 1978).
- 29 March – Sava Stojkov, Serbian painter (d. 2014).
- 1 April – Bryan Robertson, English curator (d. 2002).
- 4 April – Emmett Williams, American poet and Fluxus artist (d. 2007).
- 29 April – Iwao Takamoto, Japanese American animator, television producer and film director (d. 2007).
- 16 May – Hannes Hegen, German cartoonist and illustrator (d. 2014).
- 22 May – Jean Tinguely, Swiss painter and sculptor (d. 1991).
- 21 June – Stanley Moss, American poet, publisher and art dealer (d. 2024).
- 23 July – Burt Glinn, American photographer (d. 2008).
- 26 August – Robert Colescott, American artist (d. 2009).
- 22 October – Robert Rauschenberg, American artist (d. 2008).
- 28 October – Ian Hamilton Finlay, Scottish poet, writer, artist and gardener (d. 2006).
- 15 November – André Lufwa, Congolese sculptor (Batteur de tam-tam) (d. 2020).
- 11 December – Patrick Reyntiens, English stained glass artist (d. 2021).
- 18 December – John Szarkowski, American photographer, curator, historian and critic (d. 2007).
- date unknown
  - Bruce Breland, Americsn artist, theorist and academic (d. 2014)
  - Lamidi Olonade Fakeye, Nigerian Yoruba sculptor (d. 2009).
  - Ben Heller, American art collector (d. 2019)
  - Panayiotis Tetsis, Greek painter.

== Deaths ==
- January 8 – George Bellows, American realist painter (b. 1882)
- March 1 – Ramon Pichot, Catalan impressionist painter, mentor of Salvador Dalí (b. 1871)
- March 8 – Juliette Wytsman, Belgian painter (b. 1866)
- April 14 – John Singer Sargent, expatriate American portrait painter (b. 1856)
- April 25
  - Emily Mary Osborn, English painter (b. 1828)
  - John Quinton Pringle, Scottish painter (b. 1864)
- May 2 – Jan Štursa, Czech sculptor (b. 1880)
- July 17 – Lovis Corinth, German painter and printmaker (b. 1858)
- July 28 – Léon Augustin Lhermitte, French genre painter (b. 1844)
- August 15 – George Barbu Știrbei, Romanian patron of the arts (b. 1828)
- August 21 – Karl Brendel, German schizophrenic outsider artist (b. 1871)
- September 17 – Carl Eytel, German American artist (b. 1862)
- September 25 – Charles Cottet, French post-impressionist painter (b. 1863)
- October 21 – Heinrich von Angeli, Austrian society portrait painter (b. 1840)
- November 27 – Roger de La Fresnaye, French cubist painter (b. 1885)
- c. November – Percy Hetherington Fitzgerald, Irish literary biographer, drama critic and sculptor (b. 1834)
- December 18 – Sir Hamo Thornycroft, English figure sculptor (b. 1850)
- December 29 – Félix Vallotton, Swiss French painter and graphic artist (b. 1865)
- date unknown – Vladislav Titelbah, Serbian painter (b. 1847).

== See also ==
- 1925 in fine arts of the Soviet Union
