= James Bingham =

James Bingham may refer to:

- James Bingham (artist) (1925–2009), Belfast-based painter
- James Bingham (Indiana politician) (1861–1940), American lawyer and politician
- James M. Bingham (1828–1885), American lawyer and politician in Wisconsin
