= 1925 in fine arts of the Soviet Union =

The year 1925 was marked by many events that left an imprint on the history of Soviet and Russian Fine Arts.

== Events ==
- The Institute of Art Culture is transformed into the State Institute of Art Culture (GinKhuK). Kazimir Malevich, Vladimir Tatlin and Mikhail Matyshin work as a heads of its experimental studios.
- February 8 — The VII Exhibition of AKhRR named «Revolution, the everyday life and work» was opened in Moscow in the Pushkin Museum. Exhibited 375 works of painting and sculpture of 122 authors. The participants were Mikhail Avilov, Abram Arkhipov, Mikhail Bobyshov, Isaak Brodsky, Alexander Vakhrameev, Mitrofan Grekov, Nikolai Dormidontov, Yuly Klever, Piotr Kotov, Boris Kustodiev, Rudolf Frentz, and other important Russian artists.
- March 8 — The Exhibition «Woman in Russian painting» was opened in Moscow in Tretyakov gallery. The participants were Abram Arkhipov, Victor Vasnetsov, Alexander Golovin, Anna Golubkina, Natalia Goncharova, Boris Grigoriev, Nikolay Kasatkin, Konstantin Korovin, Boris Kustodiev, Filipp Malyavin, Vladimir Makovsky, Vasily Rozhdestvensky, Kuzma Petrov-Vodkin, Zinaida Serebriakova, and other important Russian artists.
- April — The first Exhibition of the art association «The Four Arts» was opened in Moscow in the Pushkin State Museum of Fine Arts. Exhibited 215 works of painting and sculpture of 28 authors. The participants were Lev Bruni, Aleksei Kravchenko, Pavel Kuznetsov, Nina Niss-Goldman, Kuzma Petrov-Vodkin, Martiros Saryan, Vladimir Favorsky and other important Russian artists.
- In Leningrad artist Pavel Filonov (1883–1941) organized a group of «Masters of Analytical Art».

== Births ==
- February 9 — Yaroslav Krestovsky (Russian: Ярослав Игоревич Крестовский), Russian soviet painter (died 2004).
- April 9 — Ernst Neizvestny (Russian: Эрнст Ио́сифович Неизве́стный), Russian sculptor, painter, graphic artist, and art philosopher (died 2016).
- June 15 — Vasily Golubev (Russian: Василий Васильевич Голубев), Russian soviet painter (died 1985).
- November 1 — Vladimir Malevsky (Russian: Владимир Евгеньевич Малевский), Russian painter and graphic artist (died 1981).
- December 16 — Kapitolina Rumiantseva (Russian: Капитолина Алексеевна Румянцева), Russian soviet painter (died 2002).

== See also ==
- List of Russian artists
- List of painters of Leningrad Union of Artists
- Saint Petersburg Union of Artists
- Russian culture
- 1925 in the Soviet Union

== Sources ==
- VII выставка картин и скульптуры «Революция, быт и труд. М., АХРР, 1925.
- VI выставка Общины художников. Каталог. Циркульные залы Академии художеств. Л., 1925.
- Каталог выставки заключительных работ студентов Ленинградской Академии художеств. Л., 1925.
- Выставка «Женщина в русской живописи». М., Государственная Третьяковская галерея, 1925.
- Каталог выставки художников общества "4 искусства". М., Государственная Академия художественных наук, 1925.
- Artists of Peoples of the USSR. Biography Dictionary. Vol. 1. Moscow, Iskusstvo, 1970.
- Artists of Peoples of the USSR. Biography Dictionary. Vol. 2. Moscow, Iskusstvo, 1972.
- Directory of Members of Union of Artists of USSR. Volume 1,2. Moscow, Soviet Artist Edition, 1979.
- Directory of Members of the Leningrad branch of the Union of Artists of Russian Federation. Leningrad, Khudozhnik RSFSR, 1980.
- Artists of Peoples of the USSR. Biography Dictionary. Vol. 4 Book 1. Moscow, Iskusstvo, 1983.
- Directory of Members of the Leningrad branch of the Union of Artists of Russian Federation. - Leningrad: Khudozhnik RSFSR, 1987.
- Персональные и групповые выставки советских художников. 1917-1947 гг. М., Советский художник, 1989.
- Artists of peoples of the USSR. Biography Dictionary. Vol. 4 Book 2. - Saint Petersburg: Academic project humanitarian agency, 1995.
- Link of Times: 1932 - 1997. Artists - Members of Saint Petersburg Union of Artists of Russia. Exhibition catalogue. - Saint Petersburg: Manezh Central Exhibition Hall, 1997.
- Matthew C. Bown. Dictionary of 20th Century Russian and Soviet Painters 1900-1980s. - London: Izomar, 1998.
- Vern G. Swanson. Soviet Impressionism. - Woodbridge, England: Antique Collectors' Club, 2001.
- Время перемен. Искусство 1960—1985 в Советском Союзе. СПб., Государственный Русский музей, 2006.
- Sergei V. Ivanov. Unknown Socialist Realism. The Leningrad School. - Saint-Petersburg: NP-Print Edition, 2007. - ISBN 5-901724-21-6, ISBN 978-5-901724-21-7.
- Anniversary Directory graduates of Saint Petersburg State Academic Institute of Painting, Sculpture, and Architecture named after Ilya Repin, Russian Academy of Arts. 1915 - 2005. - Saint Petersburg: Pervotsvet Publishing House, 2007.
