= At the Dressing-Table =

1909 painting by Zinaida Serebriakova

At the Dressing-Table. Self-Portrait
- За туалетом. Автопортрет (Russian)
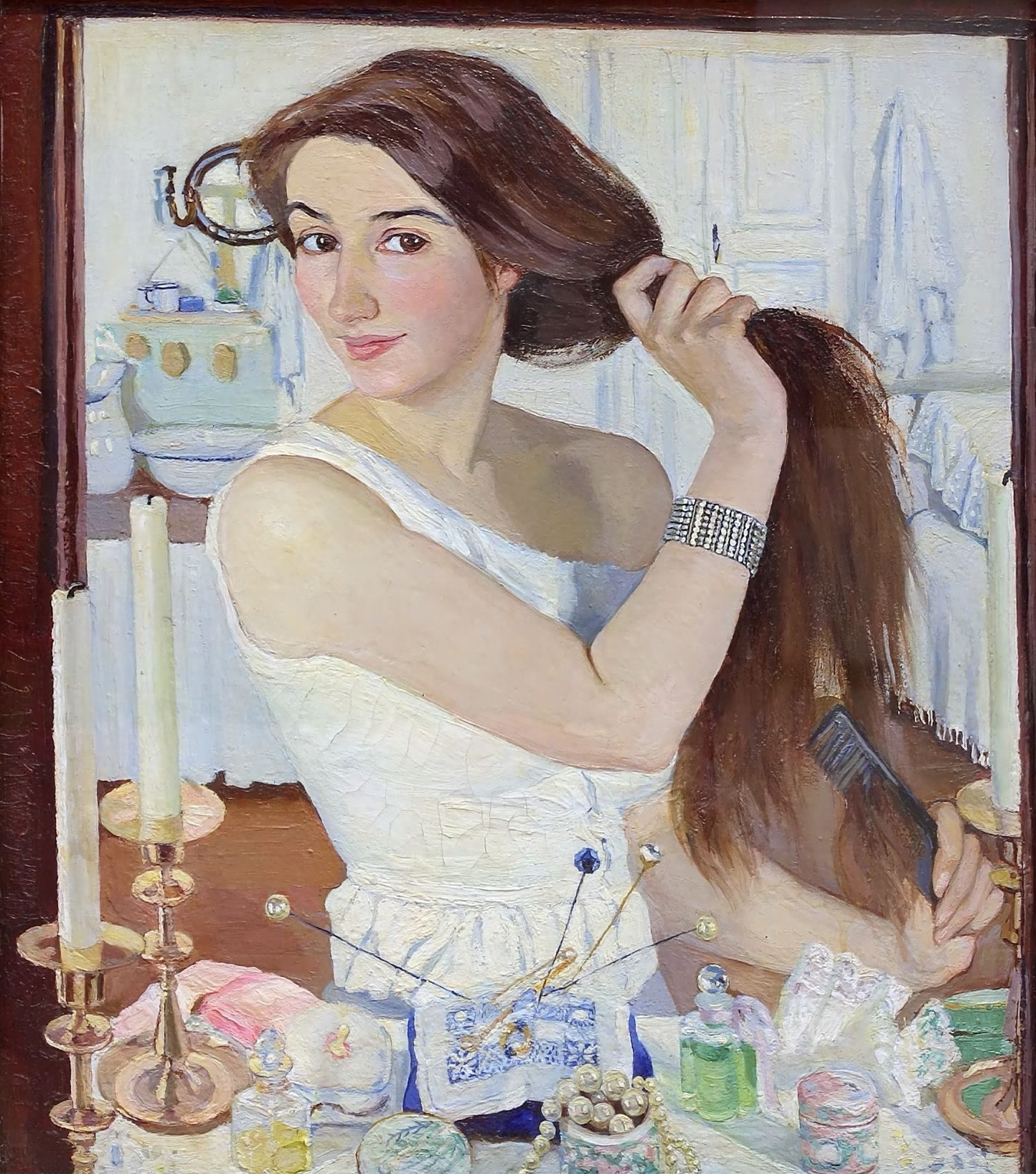
- Artist: Zinaida Serebriakova
- Year: 1909
- Medium: Oil on canvas
- Dimensions: 75 cm × 65 cm (30 in × 26 in)
- Location: Tretyakov Gallery, Moscow

At the Dressing-Table. Self-Portrait (Russian: За туалетом. Автопортрет) is a 1909 painting by Russian painter Zinaida Serebriakova. The painting is in the collection of the Tretyakov Gallery in Moscow. Its size is 75 cm × 65 cm (30 in × 26 in).

At the Dressing-Table was executed by Serebriakova in 1909 while she was living near Neskuchnoye, Kursk Governorate (now Ukraine). According to Serebriakova, the winter came early in that year, there was a lot of snow, but it was warm in the house, so "she started to paint herself in the mirror, entertaining by drawing different small things from her dressing-table".

On the insistence of Eugene Lanceray, her brother, Serebriakova sent At the Dressing-Table to Saint Petersburg. It was exhibited at the 7th exhibition of the Union of Russian Artists, which moved from Moscow in the beginning of 1910. The painting was well received by the public and art critics. The painter Valentin Serov called it a "very cute and fresh thing", while the painter and critic Alexandre Benois wrote that Serebriakova "gave to Russian public such a wonderful gift, such a "smile from ear to ear", that one cannot fail to thank her for that". Right after the exposition the painting was bought by the Tretyakov Gallery.

As of now, At the Dressing-Table is considered one of the most important works of Serebriakova along with Bath-house (1913, Russian Museum), Harvest (1915, Odesa Art Museum) and Whitening Canvas (1917, Tretyakov Gallery).
