= The Shoots of Autumn Crops =

1908 painting by Zinaida Serebriakova

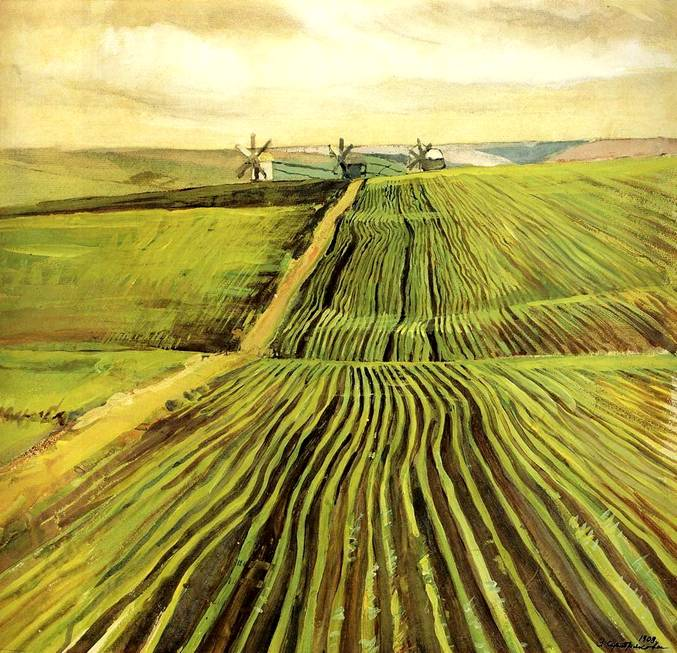
- Artist: Zinaida Serebriakova
- Year: 1908
- Medium: Oil on canvas
- Dimensions: 43.4 cm × 45 cm (17.1 in × 18 in)
- Location: Tretyakov Gallery; Moscow

The Shoots of Autumn Crops is an oil on canvas painting of 1908 by the Russian artist Zinaida Serebriakova. It was purchased by the Tretyakov Gallery in 1910.
