= A Studio in Montparnasse =

Painting by C.R.W. Nevinson

- Artist: C.R.W. Nevinson
- Year: 1925
- Type: Oil on canvas, genre painting
- Dimensions: 127 cm × 76.2 cm (50 in × 30.0 in)
- Location: Tate Britain, London

A Studio in Montparnasse is an oil painting on canvas by the British artist C.R.W. Nevinson, from 1925.

== History and description ==
It depicts the interior of an studio in the district of Montparnasse in Paris. Nevinson based it on the apartment of Sisley Huddleston which he visited that year. The Modernist painting features a nude model petting a cat and a view over the rooftops of the city seen through a large window. The painting was exhibited at the Leicester Galleries in London in 1926. It was acquired by the author H.G. Wells, and admirer of Nevinson, who presented it to the Tate Gallery the following year. When it was publicly displayed at the Tate, Huddleston complained about the addition of the female nude who had not been in the original sketch.

== Bibliography ==
- Ingleby, Richard. C.R.W. Nevinson: The Twentieth Century. Merrell Holberton, 1999.
- Walsh, Michael J.K. Hanging a Rebel: The Life of C.R.W. Nevinson. Lutterworth, 2008.
