= Zinaida Serebriakova =

Russian painter (1884–1967)

- Зинаида Серебрякова
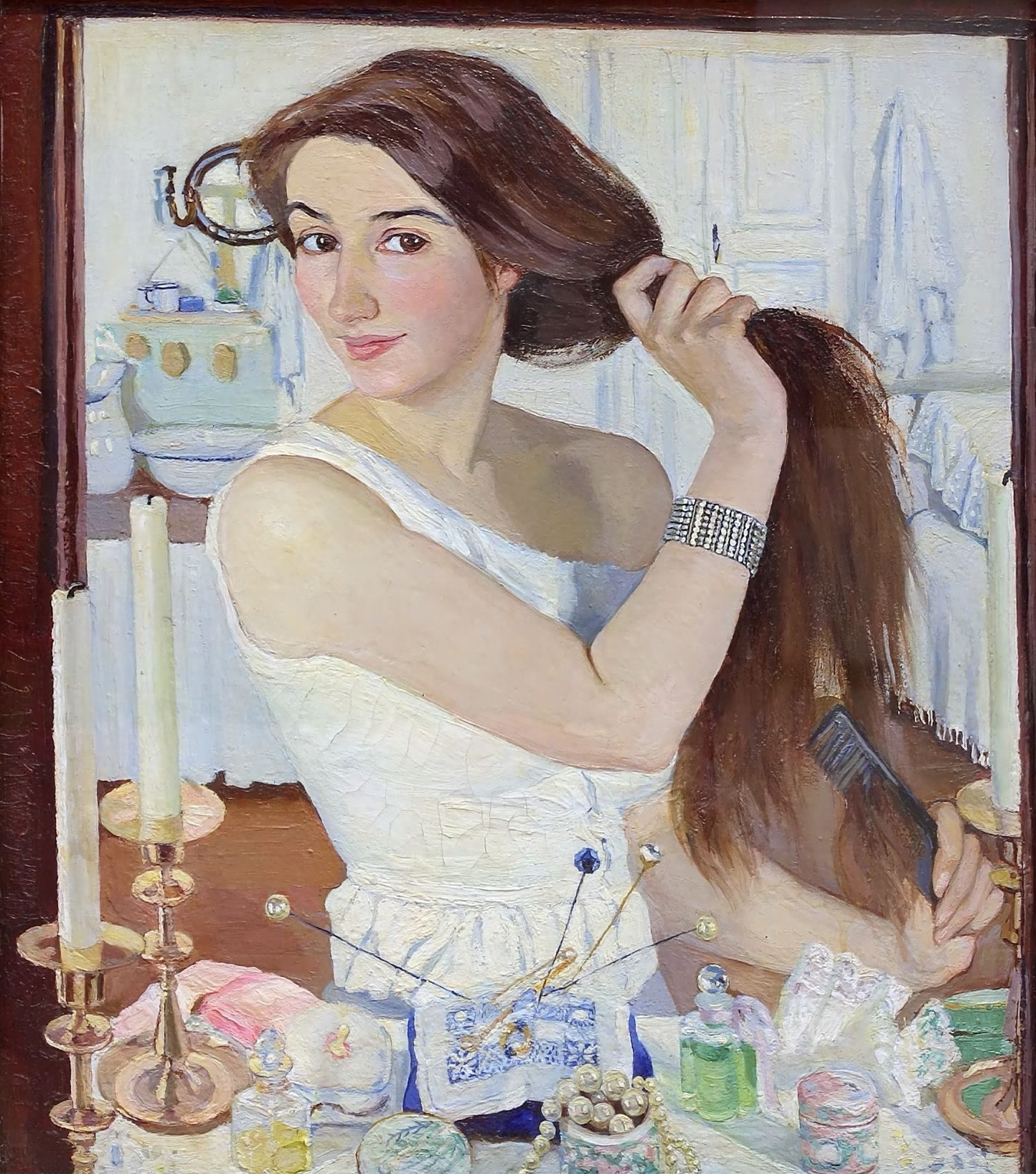
- At the Dressing-Table, self-portrait, 1909; Tretyakov Gallery
- Born: Zinaida Yevgenyevna Lansere; 10 December [O.S. 28 November] 1884; Neskuchnoye, Kursk Governorate, Russian Empire
- Died: 19 September 1967 (aged 82); Paris, France
- Resting place: Sainte-Geneviève-des-Bois Russian Cemetery, Paris
- Citizenship: Russian; French (from 1947)
- Education: Osip Braz; Académie de la Grande Chaumière
- Known for: Painting
- Movement: Representational; Neoclassical Revival; Mir iskusstva
- Spouse: Boris Serebriakov (m. 1905; died 1919)
- Children: four, including Yekaterina
- Relatives: Eugene Lanceray (brother); Nikolay Lanceray (brother)
- Family: Benois family

Zinaida Yevgenyevna Serebriakova (Note: Her last name is also often spelled as Serebryakova and her maiden name is sometimes spelled Lansere (Russian: Лансере́). She usually signed her work Z. Serebryakova or in Cyrillic script and sometimes she spelled her last name Serebryakoff (Rusakova 2006). Her family called her by the nicknames Zika and Zina (Serebryakova 1987). In French, she is also known as Zénaïde Lanceray.) (Russian: Зинаида Евгеньевна Серебрякова; née Lansere [Лансере]; 10 December [O.S. 28 November] 1884 – 19 September 1967) was a Russian painter during the Modernist period.

== Early life and education ==
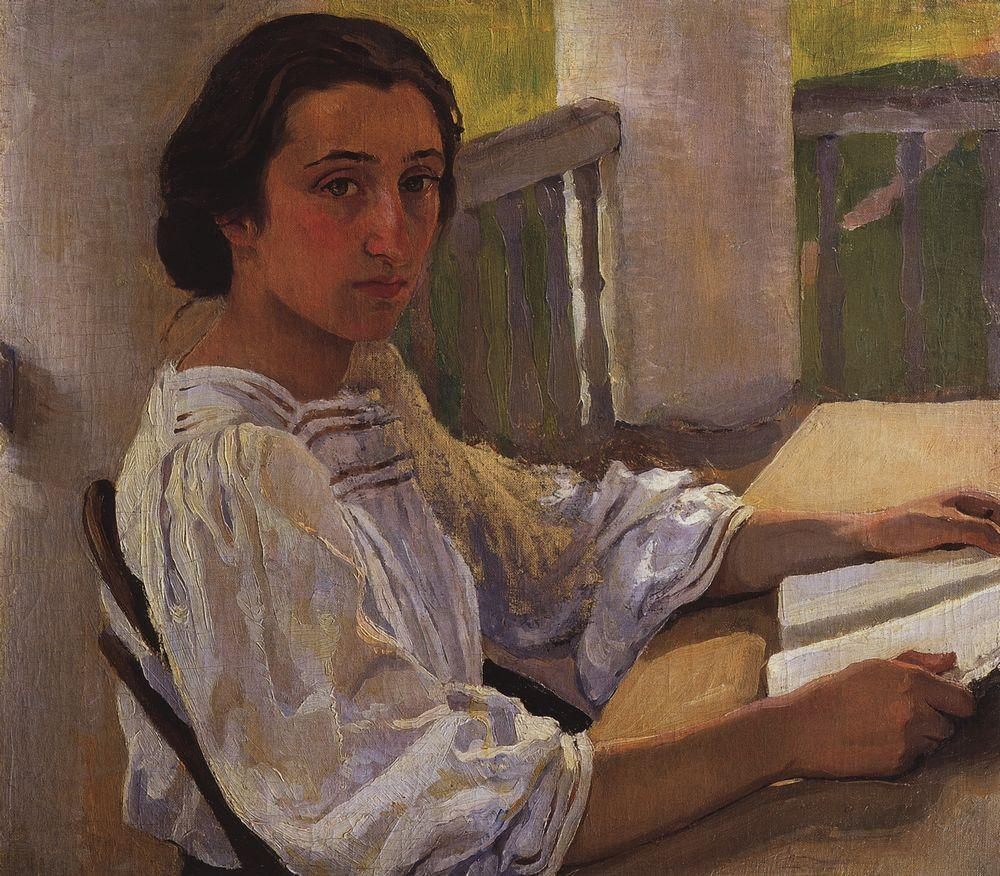
The Artist's Sister, 1911

Zinaida Yevgenyevna Lansere was born on 10 December [O.S. 28 November] 1884 on the estate of Neskuchnoye near Kharkov in the Russian Empire. Her father, Yevgeny Aleksandrovich Lansere (1848–1886), was a sculptor. Her mother, Yekaterina Lansere, was a painter and came from the artistic Benois family. Her grandfather, Nicholas Benois, was a prominent architect, chairman of the Society of Architects and member of the Imperial Academy of Arts. Her uncle, Alexandre Benois, was a painter, founder of the Mir iskusstva art group. One of Zinaida's brothers, Nikolay Lanceray, was an architect, and her other brother, Yevgeny Lanceray, had an important place in Russian and Soviet art as a master of monumental painting and graphic art. The English actor and writer Peter Ustinov was also related to her.

Her father died in 1886. Following this, Zinaida's mother took her and the rest of the children to the Benois household in Saint Petersburg. There they all grew accustomed to the presence of painters, musicians and other artistic figures. In 1900, Zinaida graduated from a women's gymnasium. In 1901, at the age of 17, she entered the art school founded by Princess Maria Tenisheva. From 1902 to 1903, she lived in Italy, and from 1903 to 1905, she studied at the studio of Osip Braz in Saint Petersburg. Following her marriage to Boris Serebriakov, she studied at the Académie de la Grande Chaumière in Paris from 1905 to 1906. During this time, she studied the works of Antoine Watteau, Jean-Honoré Fragonard, and the Impressionists. After returning to Saint Petersburg, she joined the Mir Iskusstva society.

== Early success ==
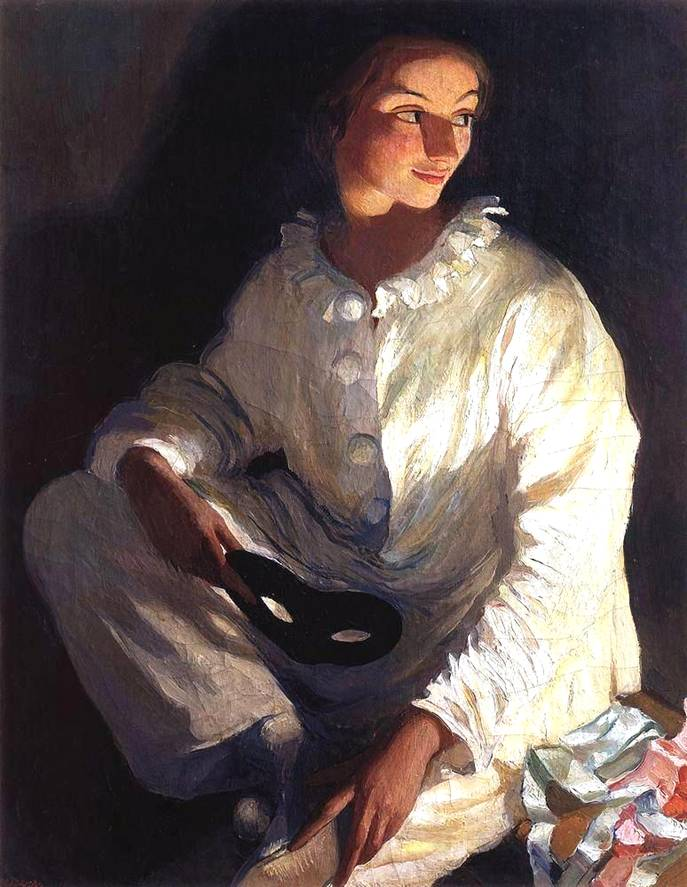
Self-Portrait as Pierrot, 1911

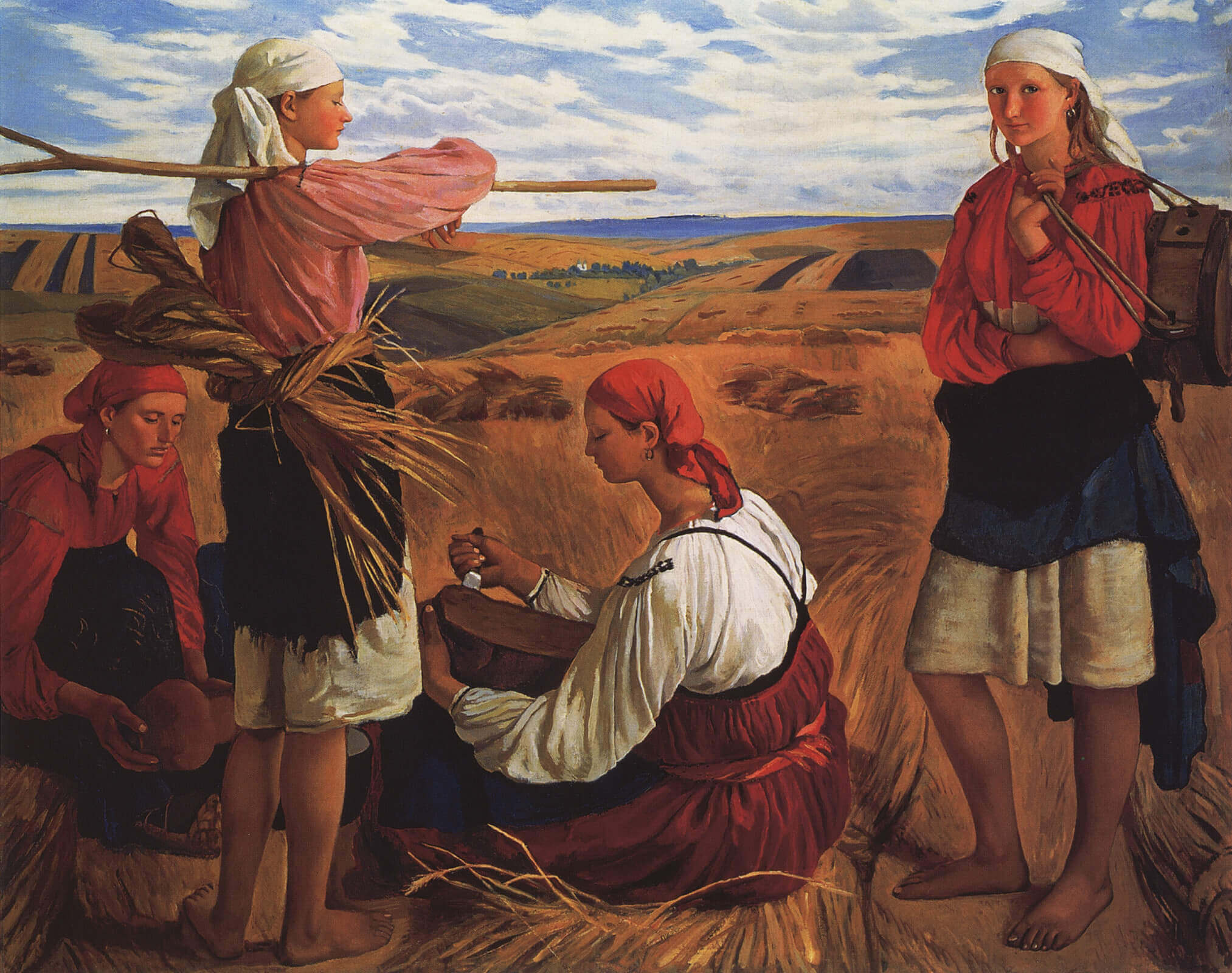
Harvest, 1915

Serebriakova's most famous self-portrait, At the Dressing-Table (1909, Tretyakov Gallery), was painted while she was snowed in at her family home and models from a nearby village were unable to travel there. Her brother Yevgeny encouraged Serebriakova to enter the painting in an exhibition mounted by Mir iskusstva in 1910, where it was received with enthusiasm and purchased for the Tretyakov Gallery collection. This marked the beginning of her success in Russia. The self-portrait was followed by Girl Bathing (1911, Russian Museum), a portrait of Ye.K. Lanceray (1911, private collection), and a portrait of the artist's mother Yekaterina Lanceray (1912, Russian Museum). From 1914 to 1917, Serebriakova produced a series of pictures on the theme of Russian rural life including Peasants (1914–1915, Russian Museum) and Sleeping Peasant Girl (private collection).

Within a decade of completing her studies, Serebriakova had received recognition from her peers. In 1916, the council of the Imperial Academy of Arts took the first steps in recognizing the achievements of Serebriakova and other women. The council recommended that the title of academician be awarded to Serebriakova, Anna Ostroumova-Lebedeva, Olga Della-Vos-Kardovskaya and Aleksandra Shneyder. However, the February Revolution the following year led to the final vote being cancelled.

In 1916, Alexander Benois was commissioned to decorate the Kazan Railway Station in Moscow and he invited Yevgeny Lanceray, Boris Kustodiev, Mstislav Dobuzhinsky, and Serebriakova to help him. Serebriakova painted murals on oriental themes.

== Revolution ==
House of Cards, 1919

After the outbreak of the October Revolution in 1917, Serebriakova's life changed for the worse. In 1918, her country estate was burned to the ground. Her husband Boris was arrested, and in 1919, he died of typhus. She was left without any income, responsible for her four children and her sick mother. All the reserves of Neskuchnoye had been plundered, so the family suffered from hunger. She had to give up oil painting in favour of the less expensive techniques of charcoal and pencil. This was the time of her most tragic painting, House of Cards, which depicts their four fatherless children.

She found some work at the Kharkov Archaeological Museum, where she made pencil drawings of the exhibits. In December 1920, she moved to her grandfather's apartment in Petrograd. After the October Revolution, inhabitants of private apartments were forced to share them with additional inhabitants, but Serebriakova was lucky – she was quartered with artists from the Moscow Art Theatre. Thus, Serebriakova's work during this period focuses on theatre life. Also around this time, Serebriakova's daughter, Tatiana, entered the academy of ballet, and Serebriakova created a series of pastels on the Mariinsky Theater. She painted a series of portraits of ballerinas after developing an interest in ballet.

== Paris ==
In the autumn of 1924, Serebriakova went to Paris, having received a commission for a large decorative mural. On finishing this work, she intended to return to the Soviet Union, where her mother and the four children remained. However, she was not able to return, and although she was able to bring her children, Alexandre and Catherine, to Paris in 1926 and 1928 respectively, she could not do the same for her two other children, Yevgeny and Tatiana, and did not see them again for many years.

After this, Serebriakova traveled a great deal. In 1928 and 1930, she traveled to Africa, visiting Morocco. During a six-week trip to Morocco in December 1928, she created more than 130 portraits and cityscapes which she called "sketches," drawn in haste as none of the locals would agree to pose, and only three landscapes for fear of straying too far from Marrakech. She was fascinated by the landscapes of northern Africa and painted the Atlas Mountains, as well as Arab women and Africans in ethnic clothing. She also painted a cycle devoted to Breton fishermen. The salient feature of her later landscapes and portraits is the artist's own personality — her love of beauty, whether in nature or in people.

In 1947, Serebriakova at last took French citizenship, and it was not until the Khrushchev Thaw that the Soviet government allowed her to resume contact with her family in the Soviet Union. In 1960, after 36 years of forced separation, her older daughter, Tatiana (Tata), was finally allowed to visit her. At this time, Tatiana was also working as an artist, painting scenery for the Moscow Art Theatre.

Serebriakova's works were finally exhibited in the Soviet Union in 1966, in Moscow, Leningrad, and Kiev, to great acclaim. Her albums sold by the millions, and she was compared to Botticelli and Renoir. Serebriakova rejoiced at success in her homeland. However, although she sent about 200 of her works to be shown in the Soviet Union, the bulk of her work remains in France today.

Serebriakova died after a brain hemorrhage in Paris on 19 September 1967, at the age of 82. She is buried in Paris, at the Russian cemetery in Sainte-Geneviève-des-Bois.

== Personal life ==
In 1905, she married her first cousin, Boris Serebriakov, the son of Yevgeny's sister, and took his surname; Boris went on to become a railroad engineer. Together, they had four children: architect Yevgeny Borisovich Serebriakov (1906–1990) and artists Alexander Borisovich Serebriakov (1907–1994), Tatiana Borisovna Serebriakova (1912–1989), and Ekaterina Borisovna Serebriakova (1913–2014).

== Selected works ==
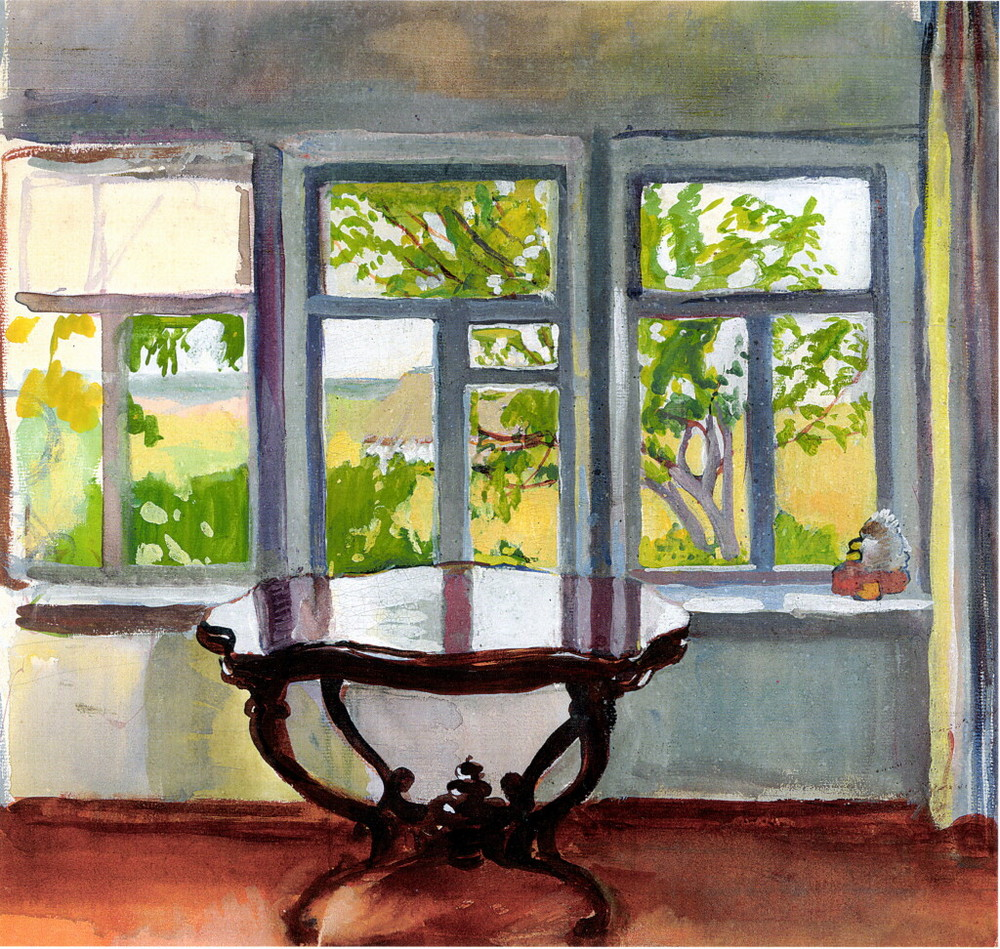
The Veranda in Spring, watercolor, 1900

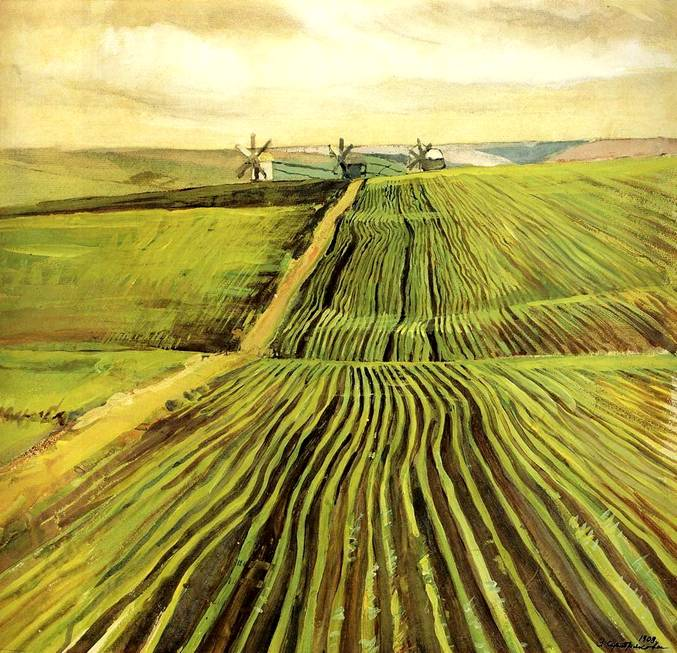
The Shoots of Autumn Crops (Зеленя осенью), 1908

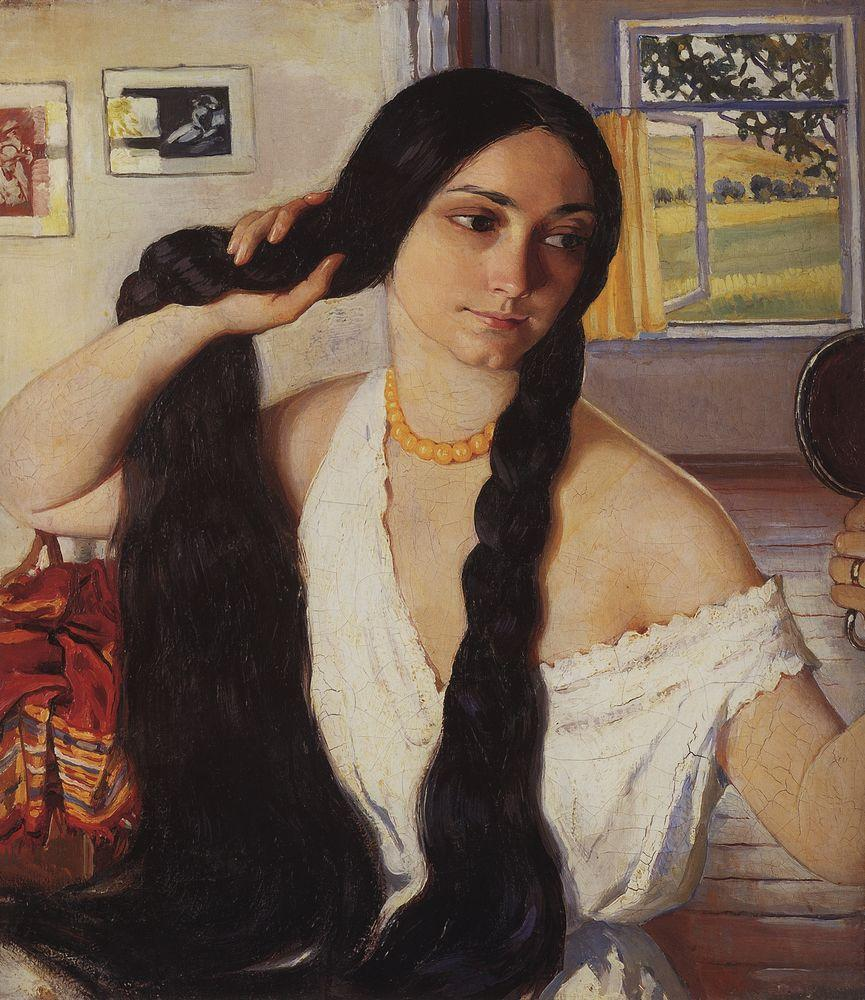
Portrait of Olga Lanceray, 1910

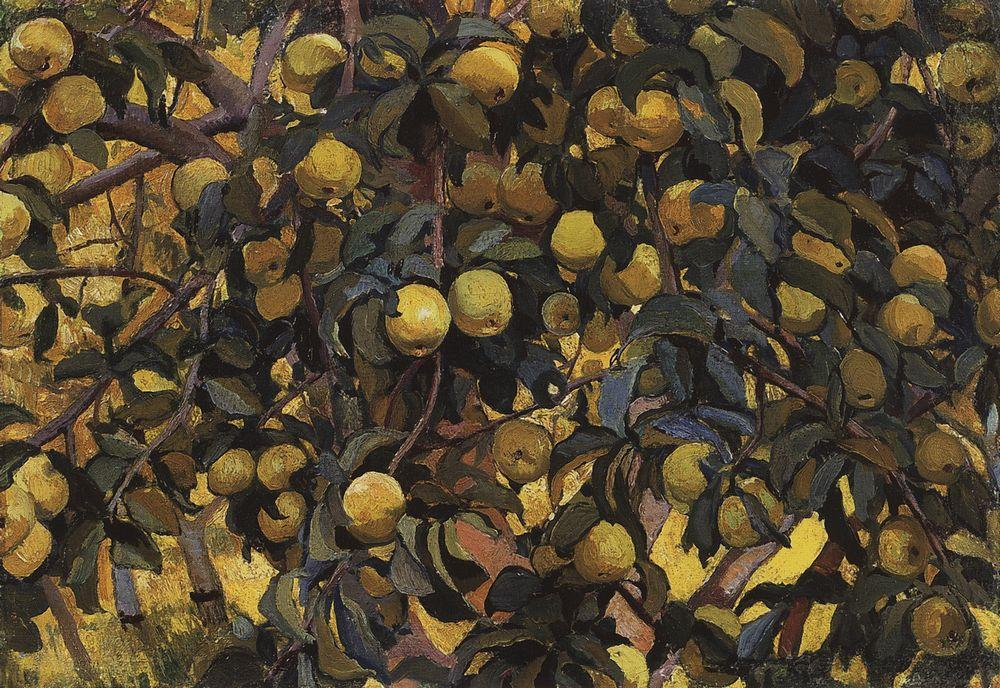
Apples on the Branches, 1910

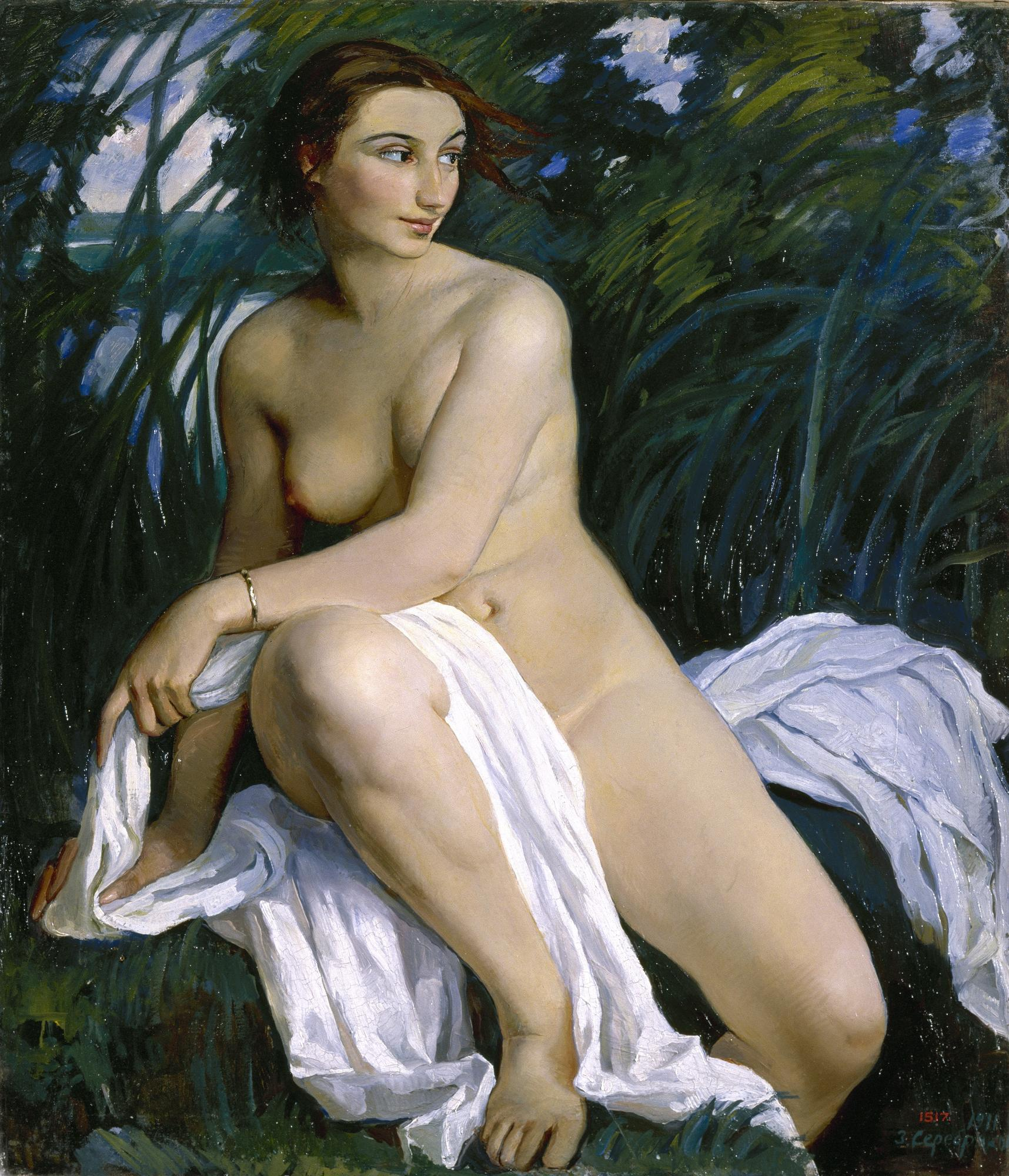
Nude (Купальщица), 1911

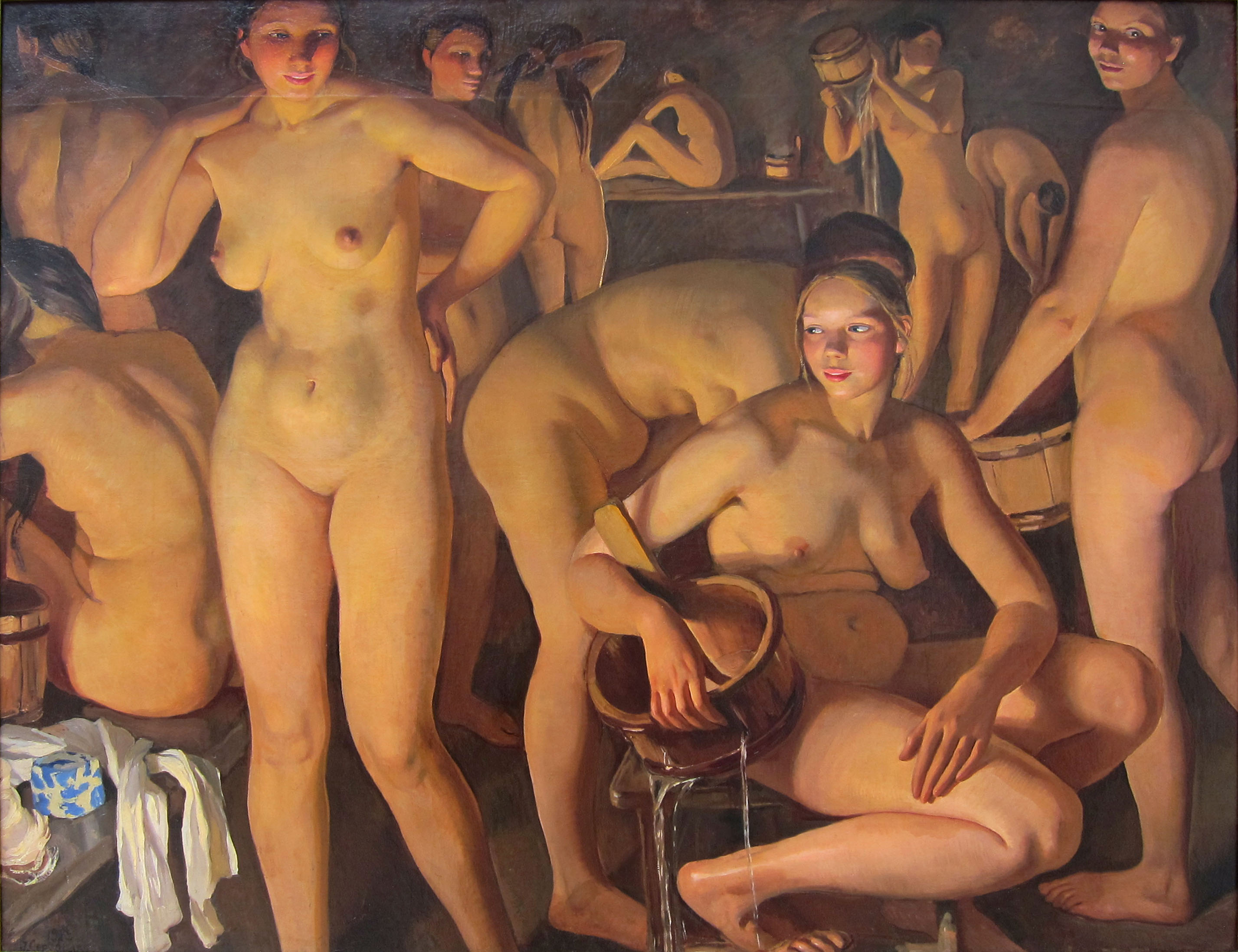
Bath-house, 1913

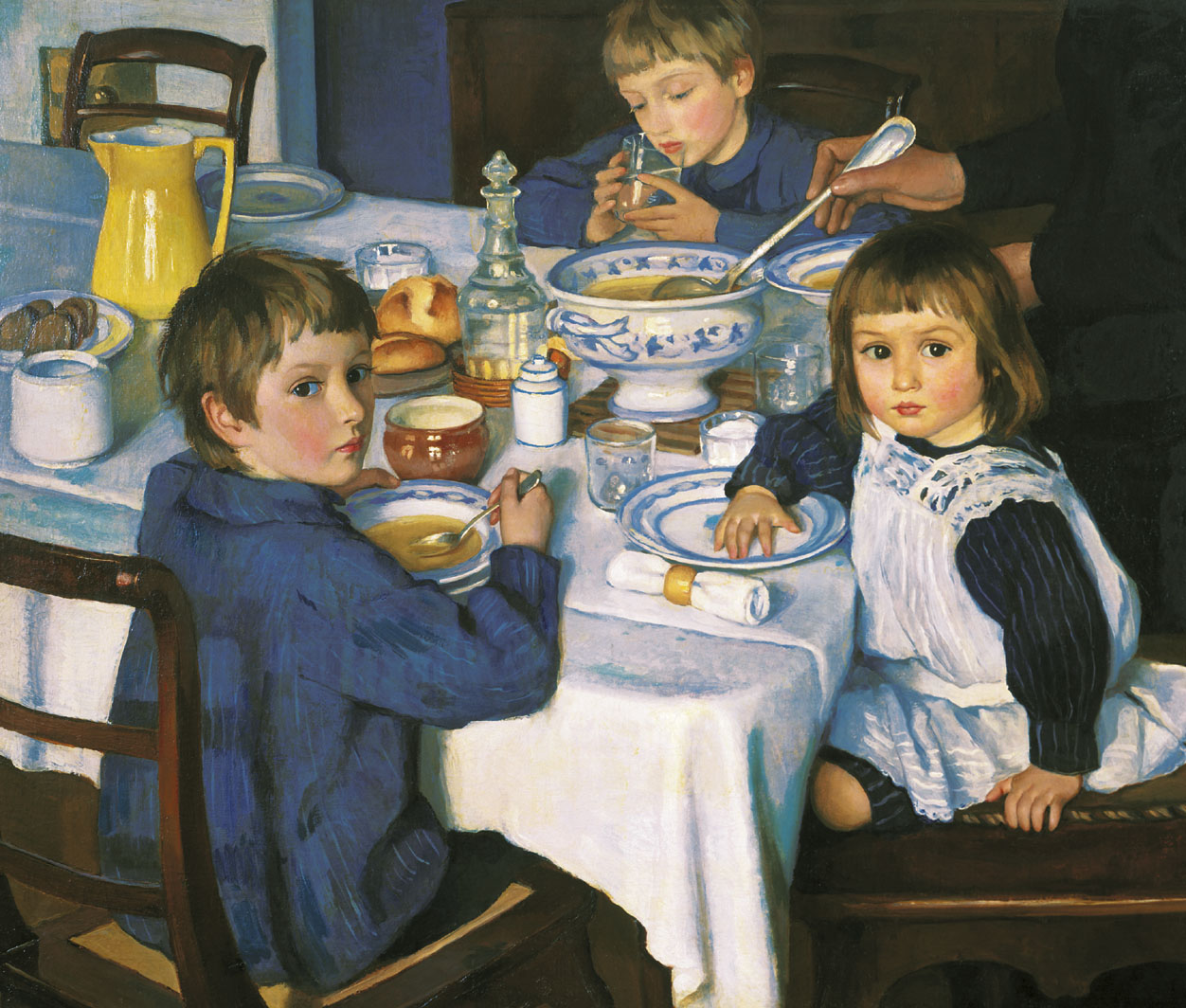
At Breakfast, 1914

== See also ==
- List of Orientalist artists
- Orientalism

== Sources ==
- Hilton, Alison L. (1982–1983). "Zinaida Serebriakova". Woman's Art Journal. 3 (2). Woman's Art, Inc.: 32–35. doi:10.2307/1358032. JSTOR 1358032. (author's home page)
- Hutton, Marcelline (1 November 2013). Remarkable Russian Women in Pictures, Prose and Poetry. Lincoln, NE: Zea Books. ISBN 978-1-60962-045-5.
- Gaze, Delia (3 April 2013). Concise Dictionary of Women Artists. Routledge. ISBN 978-1-136-59901-9.
- Kiselyov, Mikhail F. (2003). "Serebryakova [Lansere], Zinaida (Yevgen'yevna)". Grove Art Online.
- Rusakova, Alla A. [in Russian] (2006). Zinaida Serebriakova, 1884–1967 (in Russian). Moskva: Iskusstvo-XXI vek. ISBN 5-98051-032-X.
- Rusakova, Alla A. (2011) [2008]. Зинаида Серебрякова. Жизнь замечательных людей (in Russian) (2nd ed.). Moscow: Molodaya Gvardiya. ISBN 978-5-235-03436-5.
- Serebriakova, Zinaida Ye. (1987). Zinaida Serebriakova: pisma, sovremenniki o khudozhnitse [Zinaida Serebriakova: Letters, contemporaries on the artist] (in Russian). compiled by V. N. Kniazeva, annotated by U. N. Podkopaeva. Moskva: Izobrazitelnoe iskusstvo.
- Yablonskaya, M.N. (1990). Women artists of Russia's new age, 1900–1935. Anthony Parton (ed. and trans.). New York: Rizzoli. ISBN 0-8478-1090-9.
