= Les fleurs dédaignées =

1925 painting by Hilda Rix Nicholas

- The despised flowers
- Artist: Hilda Rix Nicholas
- Year: 1925
- Type: Oil paint on canvas
- Dimensions: 198 cm × 128 cm (78 in × 50 in)
- Location: National Gallery of Australia, Canberra

Les fleurs dédaignées is a 1925 painting by Australian artist Hilda Rix Nicholas.

== Artist background ==
Emily Hilda Rix (known invariably as Hilda) was born in Ballarat, Victoria on 1 September 1884. She trained at the National Gallery of Victoria Art School from 1902 to 1905, where she was taught by a leading member of the Heidelberg School, Frederick McCubbin. After the death of her father in 1906, her family sailed for England early in 1907, where Hilda Rix trained for a time before then moving to Paris. There she studied at the Académie Delecluse, took lessons with American impressionist Richard Emil Miller, and attended the Académie de la Grande Chaumière, where Swiss-born illustrator Théophile Steinlen taught her. After successfully exhibiting works painted in north Africa, and a tragic marriage that ended within weeks when her husband, Matson Nicholas, was killed on the Western Front, Rix Nicholas returned to Australia. Rix Nicholas exhibited and painted in Australia in the early 1920s, before returning to France in 1924.

== The painting ==
In 1925, Rix Nicholas created one of her most extraordinary works, which would also be her largest canvas. Standing almost 2 metres (6.6 ft) high, and 128 centimetres (4.20 ft) wide, Les fleurs dédaignées ('The despised flowers') is an "unnerving" and "arresting" portrait of a young woman in fashionable eighteenth-century clothing. Painted not with the artist's typical technique, but in a mannerist style, the subject faces the viewer yet is glancing away, her pose tense, with a bunch of discarded flowers on the ground next to the hem of her enormous formal dress. The meaning of her pose and expression has preoccupied critics. While Pigot considered the subject to be "tense", other writers were less sure. Jennifer Gall thought that the subject represented tumultuous emotions, with a deliberate contrast between a pleasant setting and a disdainful expression. Artist Carole Best was in no doubt, concluding that the subject was "clearly pissed off". Curator Anne Gray of the National Gallery of Australia observed "considerable emotional heat emanating from the subject", but wondered whether it was the case that the subject was irritated, or whether her expression could in fact be "the glimmer of a smile?"

Although portraying a young lady, the person chosen to sit was "a Parisian professional model and a prostitute, apparently with a reputation for being moody and cantankerous". The pastiche created in this work is striking: a sixteenth-century artistic style, a composition comprising a seventeenth-century tapestry, but with an eighteenth-century-style dress. The tapestry on which the backdrop is based was owned by the artist (though lost in a fire after her death). The dress was created for the model to wear for this composition.

The work reflects the scope of Rix Nicholas's abilities and ambitions, as she created a painting specifically with the intention of having it hung at the Paris Salon. When the work was displayed in Sydney in 1927, it grabbed The Sydney Morning Herald critic's attention:

For combination of grace, dramatic strength, and clearness in technique this picture would be difficult to surpass. There is nothing finicky about it; it tells its story with vivid directness. As a background to the figure Mrs. Rix Nicholas has set a piece of antique tapestry, so that the trees on either side lean in arch-wise over the head, the face and shoulders stand out clearly against an expanse of sky, and behind the body and limbs extends a countryside full of towers and rivers and trees. The quaint conventionality of this background accords exactly with the late eighteenth-century costume, all sprigged with roses and heliotrope; and the whole mass of detail harmonies [sic] perfectly with the type of the model's face. It is a cold, selfish face. The artist has brought out with revealing strokes an expression of vindictive malice which is for the moment resting there; and the hands, the fingers of one grasped tightly by the other, give a clear indication of nervous tension within. The treatment of flesh tones and the general arrangemet [sic], drawing attention gently but not too obtrusively to the columbines scattered on the polished floor—those are excellent.

The painting was purchased by the National Gallery of Australia in 2008 from the artist's son, Rix Wright.
