= Equivalents =

Photography series by Alfred Stieglitz

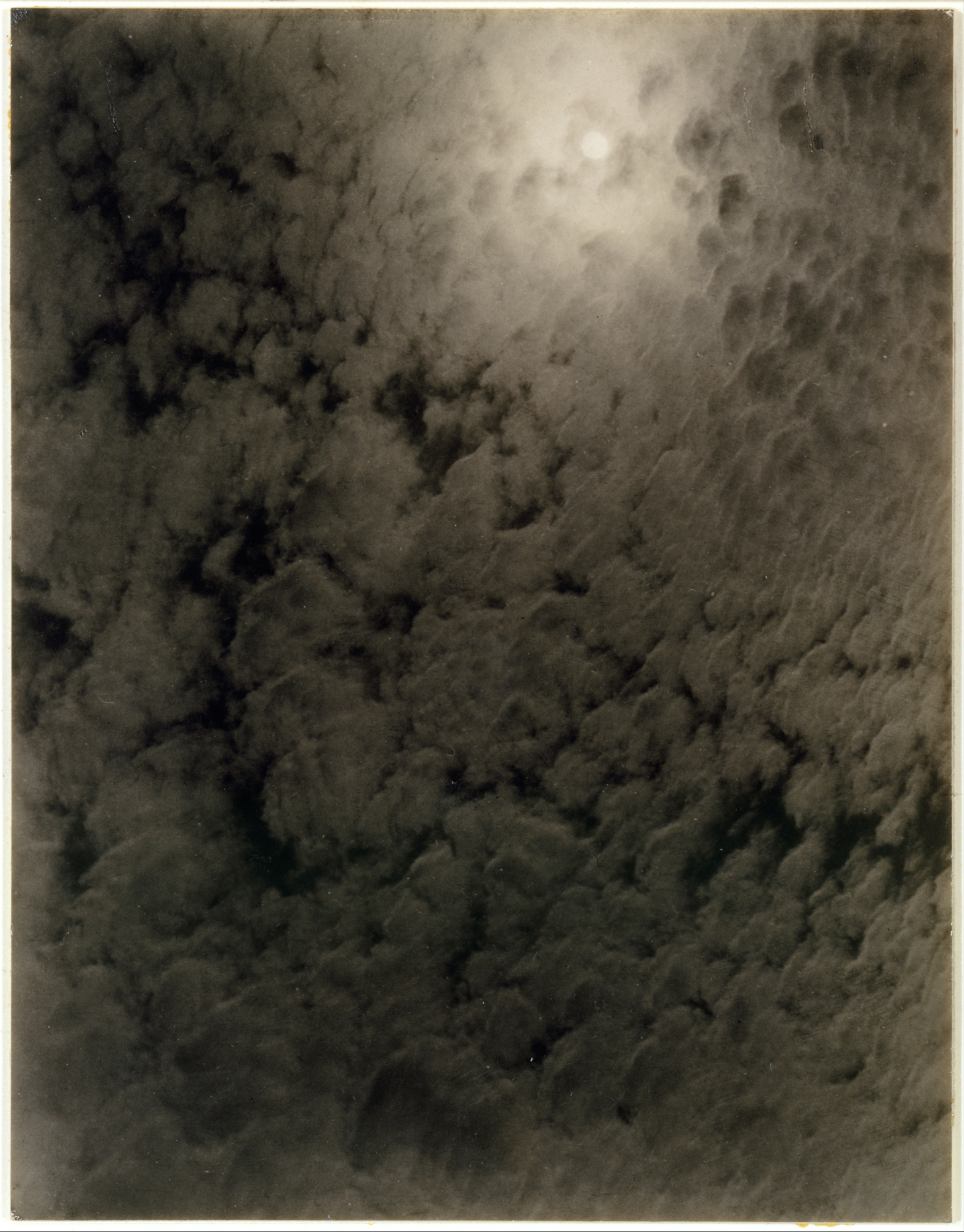
Equivalent (1926), one of many photographs of the sky taken by Stieglitz

Equivalents is a series of photographs of clouds taken by Alfred Stieglitz from 1925 to 1934. They are generally recognized as the first photographs intended to free the subject matter from literal interpretation, and, as such, are some of the first completely abstract photographic works of art.

== Description ==
Stieglitz took at least 220 photographs that he called Equivalent or Equivalents; all feature clouds in the sky. The majority of them show only the sky without any horizon, buildings or other objects in the frame, but a small number do include hills or trees. One series from 1927 prominently features poplar trees in the foreground.

Almost all of the photographs are printed very darkly so the sky often appears black or nearly black. The contrast between the sky and the much lighter clouds is striking in all but a few of the prints. Some images include the sun either as a distinct element in the photograph or as an illuminating force behind the clouds.

== Background ==
The multiple series Stieglitz called Equivalents combined two very important aspects of his photography: the technical and the aesthetic. He was a master at both, but with Equivalents he succeeded in bringing his skills to a new level. On the technical side, Stieglitz had been fascinated by the special problems of photographing clouds ever since the summer of 1887, when he took his first pictures of clouds over Lake Como in Italy. Until the 1920s most photographic emulsions were orthochromatic, which meant they were primarily sensitive to light on the blue end of the spectrum. This made photographing clouds particularly difficult because unless special filters were used the sky would appear very light and the clouds would be lost against it. Over the years Stieglitz repeatedly took photographs of clouds using orthochromatic emulsions, but he reported "Every time I developed [a cloud negative] I was so wrought up, always believing I had nearly gotten what I was after – but had failed."

In 1922 Stieglitz read a commentary about his photography by Waldo Frank that suggested the strength of his imagery was in the power of the individuals he photographed. Stieglitz was outraged, believing Frank had at best ignored his many photographs of buildings and street scenes, and at worst had accused him of being a simple recorder of what appeared in front of him. He resolved immediately to begin a new series of cloud studies "to show that (the success of) my photographs (was) not due to subject matter – not to special trees or faces, or interiors, to special privileges – clouds were there for everyone..." He said "I wanted to photograph clouds to find out what I had learned in forty years about photography. Through clouds to put down my philosophy of life –...My aim is increasingly to make my photographs look so much like photographs that unless one has eyes and sees, they won't be seen – and still everyone will never forget them having once looked at them."

Coincidentally at this same time a new panchromatic photographic emulsion was developed that allowed the full range of colors to be captured. Soon after it became available Stieglitz aimed his 8 in × 10 in (200 mm × 250 mm) view camera at the sky and began taking pictures. By the next year he had created a series of ten mounted photographs he called Music: A Sequence of Ten Cloud Photographs (also called Clouds in Ten Movements). He told his wife Georgia O'Keeffe "I wanted a series that when seen by Ernest Bloch (the great composer) he would exclaim: Music! Music! Man, why that is music! How did you ever do that? And he would point to violins and flutes, and oboes, and brass..." He first exhibited this series in 1923 in his one-man show at the Anderson Galleries in New York, and reported that when Bloch saw them there he had exactly the reaction Stieglitz had wanted.

Encouraged by the success of the Music series he took his smaller 4 in × 5 in (100 mm × 130 mm) Graflex camera and shot dozens of pictures of the sky in the summer of 1923. He arranged many of these photographs into distinct series he called Songs of the Sky. In late 1924 he exhibited sixty-one of his cloud photos in a single room at the Anderson Galleries. In the catalog to the exhibition he wrote "Songs of the Sky – Secrets of the Skies as revealed by my Camera are tiny photographs, direct revelations of a man's world in the sky – documents of eternal relationship – perhaps even a philosophy." After seeing the exhibition, Ananda Coomaraswamy, who was then curator at the Museum of Fine Arts in Boston, persuaded Stieglitz to donate some of his photographs, including five from Songs of the Sky, to the museum. This was the first time a major museum in the U.S. acquired photographs as part of its permanent collection.

Stieglitz continued photographing clouds and skies for most of the next decade. In 1925 he began referring to these photographs as Equivalents, a name he used for all such photographs taken from that year forward. In 1929 he renamed some of the original Songs of the Sky as Equivalents, and these prints are still known by both names today.

Dorothy Norman once recorded a conversation between Stieglitz and a man looking at one of his Equivalents prints:

Man (looking at a Stieglitz Equivalent): Is this a photograph of water?
Stieglitz: What difference does it make of what it is a photograph?
Man: But is it a photograph of water?
Stieglitz: I tell you it does not matter.
Man: Well, then, is it a picture of the sky?
Stieglitz: It happens to be a picture of the sky. But I cannot understand why that is of any importance.

Stieglitz certainly knew what he had achieved in these pictures. Writing about his Equivalents to Hart Crane, he declared: "I know exactly what I have photographed. I know I have done something that has never been done...I also know that there is more of the really abstract in some 'representation' than in most of the dead representations of the so-called abstract so fashionable now."

== Artistic importance ==
The Equivalents are sometimes recognized as the first intentionally abstract photographs, although this claim may be difficult to uphold given Alvin Langdon Coburn's Vortographs that were created almost a decade earlier. Nonetheless, it is difficult to look at them today and understand the impact that they had at the time. When they first appeared photography had been generally recognized as a distinct art form for no more than fifteen years, and until Stieglitz introduced his cloud photos there was no tradition of photographing something that was not recognizable in both form and content. Art critic Hilton Kramer said that Equivalents "undoubtedly owe something to the American modernist painting (Dove's and O'Keeffe's especially) that Stieglitz felt particularly close to at the time. Yet they go distinctly beyond the pictorial conventions that governed avant-garde painting in this period by reaching for the kind of lyric abstraction that was not to enter American painting until the 1940s and 1950s. In the line that can be traced from the paintings of Albert Pinkham Ryder to, say, those of Clyfford Still, it is in Stieglitz's Equivalents – rather than in painting itself – that we find the strongest link."

One of the reasons that the strongest of these photographs appear so abstract is that they are void of any reference points. Stieglitz was not concerned with a particular orientation for many of these prints, and he was known to exhibit them sideways or upside down from how he originally mounted them. Photography historian Sarah Greenough points out that by doing so Stieglitz "was destabilizing your [the viewer's] relationship with nature in order to have you think less about nature, not to deny that it's a photograph of a cloud, but to think more about the feeling that the cloud formation evokes." She further says:

"The Equivalents are photographs of shapes that have ceded their identity, in which Stieglitz obliterated all references to reality normally found in a photograph. There is no internal evidence to locate these works either in time or place. They could have been taken anywhere—nothing indicates whether they were made in Lake George, New York City, Venice, or the Alps—and, except for the modern look of the gelatin silver prints, they could have been made at any time since the invention of photography. And because there is no horizon line in these photographs, it is not even clear which way is 'up' and which way 'down.' Our confusion in determining a 'top' and a 'bottom' to these photographs, and our inability to locate them in either time or place, forces us to read what we know are photographs of clouds as photographs of abstracted forms."

New York Times art critic Andy Grundberg said The Equivalents "remain photography's most radical demonstration of faith in the existence of a reality behind and beyond that offered by the world of appearances. They are intended to function evocatively, like music, and they express a desire to leave behind the physical world, a desire symbolized by the virtual absence of horizon and scale clues within the frame. Emotion resides solely in form, they assert, not in the specifics of time and place."

Photographer Ansel Adams said Stieglitz's work had a profound influence on him. In 1948 he claimed his first "intense experience in photography" was seeing many of the Equivalents (probably for the first time in 1933, when they met).

== Series and sets ==
Stieglitz arranged the photographs he called Equivalent into several different groups when he exhibited or published them, and often he inscribed the mounted prints on the back with one or more letters to further identify what he called "sets". These groupings are not sequential, and Stieglitz did not consider any single series or set as a discrete unit. Some of the individual prints are included in more than one series or set, and some copies of the same print are inscribed with different identifications. In general, his sets should be seen as "totally artificial constructions which mirror, not the passage of real time, but the change and flux of Stieglitz’s subjective state."

The following is a chronological listing of the Equivalents photographs. Many of the prints do not have individual titles, and dozens of photographs are known by the same generic name Equivalent. The most comprehensive catalog of these photographs is found in Alfred Stieglitz: The Key Set., and the numbers in this list refer to the photographs identified in that publication.

- 1923 – Songs of the Sky "W" / Equivalent "W" – two prints (Key Set #950–951). These prints were originally part of the Songs of the Sky series, but in 1929 Stieglitz renamed them Equivalents. These are not the same prints as those belonging to "Set W" taken in 1929.
- 1923 – Songs of the Sky "XX" / Equivalent "XX" –four prints (Key Set #952–955). These prints were originally part of the Songs of the Sky series, but in 1929 Stieglitz renamed them Equivalents. These are not the same prints as those belonging to "Set XX" taken in 1929.
- 1923 – Songs of the Sky / Equivalent – thirty-four prints (Key Set #956–989). These prints were originally part of the Songs of the Sky series, but in 1929 Stieglitz renamed them Equivalents.
- 1925 – Forty-five prints (Key Set #1093–1137)
- 1926 – Twenty prints (Key Set #1159–1178)
- 1927 – Ten prints (Key Set #1198–1207)
- 1928 – Twenty-seven prints (Key Set #1208–1239)
- 1929 – Set B: two prints (Key Set #1282–1283)
- 1929 – Set C2: five prints (Key Set #1253–1257)
- 1929 – Set HH: three prints (Key Set #1258–1260)
- 1929 – Set K: three prints (Key Set #1261–1263)
- 1929 – Set O: seven prints (Key Set #1264–1270)
- 1929 – Set W: five prints (Key Set #1277–1281)
- 1929 – Set XX: nine prints (Key Set #1284–1292)
- 1929 – Thirteen prints ("Key Set" #1293–1305)
- 1930 – Twenty prints (Key Set #1330–1349)
- 1931 – Fifteen prints (Key Set #1412–1426)
- 1933 – Three prints (all from one negative) (Key Set #1512–1514)
- 1934 – Six prints (Key Set #1558–1563)
