= The Harlequin's Carnival =

Painting by Joan Miró

- Artist: Joan Miró
- Year: 1924/1925
- Medium: Oil on canvas
- Dimensions: 66 cm × 90.5 cm (26 in × 35 5/8 in)
- Location: Albright–Knox Art Gallery; Buffalo
- Website: albrightknox.org

The Harlequin's Carnival (Spanish: Carnaval de Arlequín) is an oil painting painted by Joan Miró between 1924 and 1925. It is one of the most outstanding surrealist paintings of the artist, and it is preserved in the Albright–Knox Art Gallery in Buffalo, New York.

Created between 1924 and 1925, Harlequin’s Carnival is one of Joan Miró's best-known pieces. Harlequin is the name of a well-known Italian comic theater character that is generally identified by his checkered costume. The ‘carnival’ in the title of the painting may refer to Mardi Gras, the celebration that occurs before the fasting of Lent begins.

In 1924, poet André Breton formed the Surrealist movement. Around the time of the group's formation, Miró started to paint in the surrealist style. Surrealism focused on dreams and the subconscious as artistic material, and Miró was able to draw from these ideas. He painted the subconscious, but also his own life experiences and memories. To combine these two sources he draws on his imagination to create magical elements in his paintings. This can even be seen in his early work, for instance in his 1922 detailist painting The Farm.

== Description ==
This specific painting is centered on a harlequin at a carnival. Although the harlequin resembles a guitar, he still retains some of his harlequin characteristics such as a checkered costume, a mustache, an admiral's hat, and a pipe. The harlequin in this painting is sad, which could be due to the hole in his stomach. This detail may refer to Miró's personal life experiences because at this point in his life he did not have much money for food and was on the brink of starvation. This is a painting of a celebration; all the characters seem to be happy due to the fact they are playing, singing, and dancing. Some of the objects in the painting are anthropomorphized, and some seem to be moving and dancing as well. One example is the ladder to the left of the painting, which has an ear and an eye (Albright-Knox Art Gallery). According to Miró, the ladder is a symbol of flight, evasion, and elevation. The green sphere to the right of the painting represents the globe because Miró, according to him, was obsessed with the idea of “conquering the world” (Albright-Knox Art Gallery). The cat in the bottom right of the painting represents Miró's actual cat, who was always next to him as he painted. The black triangle in the window in the top right corner represents the Eiffel Tower. The painting includes many other fantastical and magical elements such as mermaids, fish out of water, dancing cats, shooting stars, a creature with wings in a box resembling a dice, floating musical notes, and a floating hand. There are many strange forms and squiggly shapes that seem to be moving or floating around the canvas.

In the international peer-reviewed journal JAMA Psychiatry, James C. Harris, MD, writes that for Miró, “painting was a means to express his inner life through visionary art” (p 226). This is a reference to Miró's style of painting, automatism, essentially painting without planning the subject or composition. In this process the artist paints whatever comes to mind, thereby painting his subconscious thoughts. Once the shapes are on the canvas, the artist is able to create images out of the forms based on his imagination. In 1931, Miró said, “I’m only interested in anonymous art, the kind that springs from the collective unconscious” (JAMA Psychiatry).

== Bibliography ==
- Malet, Rosa Maria (1993). Joan Miró (Segona edició. ed.). Barcelona: Edicions 62. ISBN 84-297-3568-2.
- Malet, Rosa Maria (2003). Joan Miró: apunts d'una col.lecció : obres de la Gallery K. AG = notes on a collection: paintings from the Gallery K. AG. Barcelona: Fundació Joan Miró. ISBN 978-84-932159-8-9.
- Penrose, Roland (1993). Miró (1. ed.). London: Thames and Hudson. ISBN 84-233-1976-8.
- Raillard, Georges (1993). Miró ([1a. ed.]. ed.). Madrid: Debate. ISBN 84-7444-605-8.
- Rebull Trudel, Melania (1994). Joan Miró: 1893-1983. Madrid: Globus. ISBN 84-88424-96-5.
- Saura, Antonio (26 December 1983). "La cara oculta de un pintor". El País, 26/12/1983.
