= Bruce Breland =

Bruce Breland (1925–2014) was an American multi-disciplinary visual artist, academic, and theorist. He is most well known as the founder and progenitor of the DAX art exhchange. He meanwile served as the chairman of the Carnegie Mellon University painting and sculptute department and then a professor emeritus at the same imstitution.

== Biography ==
As a working artist he was an early colleague of Roy Lichtenstein. He was the founder of Digital Art Exchange (DAX). A DAX project was incorporated into the 19th Venice Biennale, the theme of which was an exploration of the historical and conceptual intersections between creative art and scientific inquiry.

As Breland himself explained in his essay "Reversing the Lens System: Dax in 1991" in the journsl Leonardo (MIT Press) ."I like to think of "Daxonians" as sojourners embarked on a journey without end- artist travellers, whom I choose to call mariners, cultural navigators moving about in a great telematic sea working to connect mind to mind'...

His work was included in the exhibition The City of Lost & Found at the Princeton University Art Museum.

He was also associated with the art group Plexus International.
