= Royal Academy Exhibition of 1925 =

1925 art exhibition in London

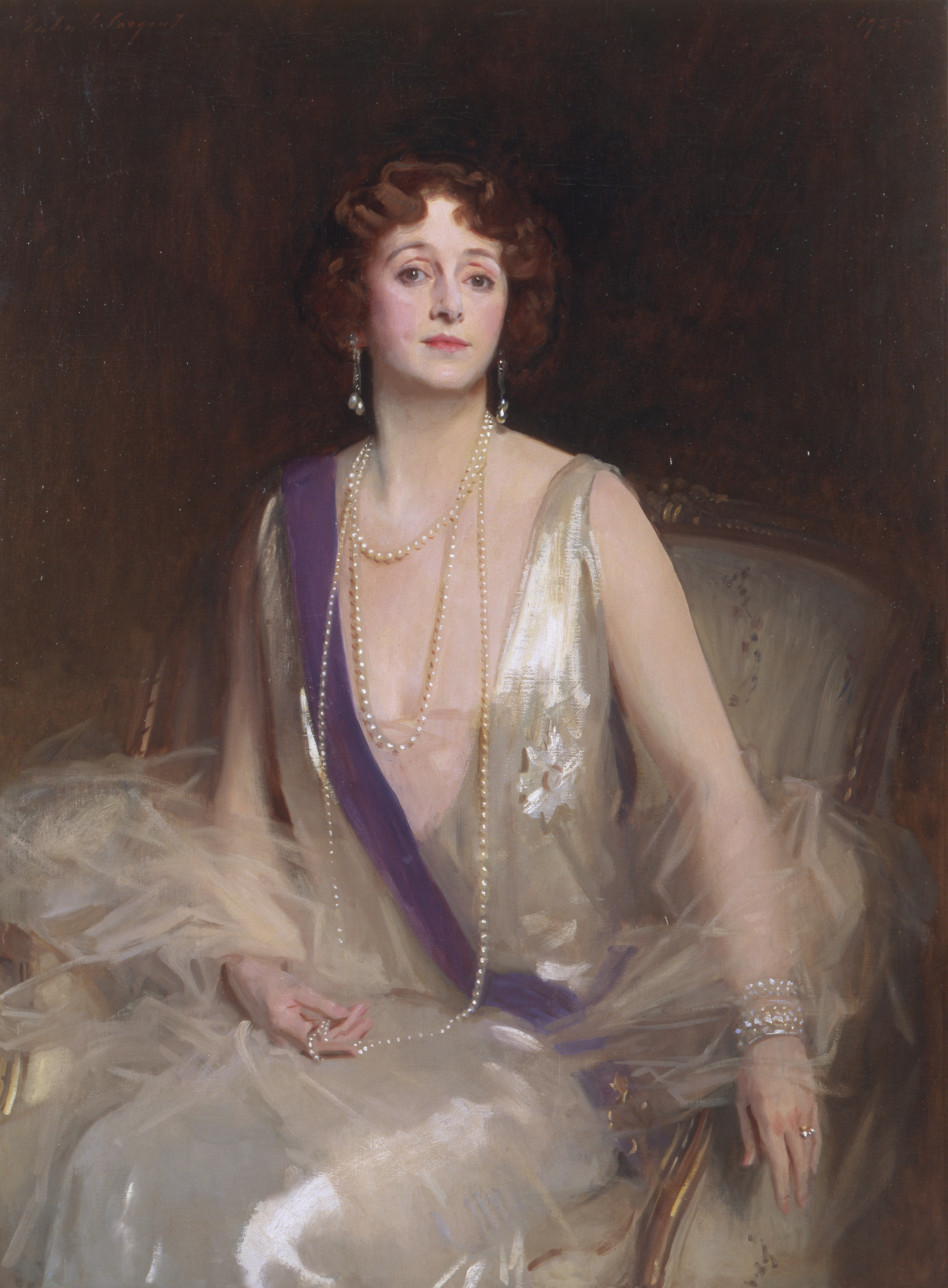
Portrait of the Marchioness Curzon of Kedleston by John Singer Sargent

The Royal Academy Exhibition of 1925 was an art exhibition held in London, the hundred and fifty seventh annual Summer Exhibition of the British Royal Academy of Arts. It took place at Burlington House in Piccadilly from 4 May to 8 August 1925 and attracted over a 154,000 visitors. Reviewers noted that there was a heavy emphasis on more traditional art and an exclusion of Modernism.

The Anglo-American artist John Singer Sargent died in April not long before exhibition opened. His already submitted work a portrait of Grace Curzon, Marchioness Curzon of Kedleston, the wife of the politician George Curzon, was displayed with a wreath of laurel leaves in tribute to the artist. Alfred Munnings, a future President of the Royal Academy, displayed The Coming Storm. Philip Connard exhibited his diploma work Apollo and Daphne.

== Bibliography ==
- The Exhibition of the Royal Academy of Arts. Royal Academy, 1925.
