= Sisley Huddleston =

British journalist and writer

Sisley Huddleston (28 May 1883 – 14 July 1952) was a British journalist and writer.

== Life ==
After editing a British forces newspaper in the First World War, he was resident in Paris after the war until the 1930s, writing for The Times (London) and the Christian Science Monitor. In his Europe in Zigzags (1929) he supported the Pan-Europe manifesto of Richard von Coudenhove-Kalergi. War Unless (1933) was a "deliberately alarmist" call for revision of the Treaty of Versailles.

During the Second World War, he was in Vichy France, taking French citizenship and writing in sympathy with the regime. He interviewed Marshal Philippe Pétain.

He was arrested in October 1944 by French authorities on treason charges. The arrest was ended by the intervention of the representatives of general Eisenhower and of the British ambassador. As well as general de Benouvile, acting for general De Gaulle. Later on the government spokesman admitted the mistake and the court condemned in the most unequivocal terms the "gross blunder" committed by its agents. The administration was ordered to pay Huddleston and his wife substantial damages.

Huddleston wrote a number of works that were critical in particular of the Allied handling of the Liberation of France and politicians' diplomacy.

== Works ==
- Peace-making at Paris, T. Fisher Unwin, 1919.
- Poincaré, A Biographical Portrait, Little, Brown & Company, 1924.
- Those Europeans: Studies Of Foreign Faces, G.P. Putman's Sons, 1924.
- France and the French, C. Scribner's Sons, 1925.
- France: The France of Today, C. Scribner's Sons, 1927.
- In and About Paris, Methuen, 1927 [Illustrated by Hanslip Fletcher].
- Mr. Paname: A Paris Fantasia, George H. Doran Co., 1927.
- Bohemian Literary and Social Life in Paris: Salons, Cafes, Studios, G.G. Harrap & Co., Ltd., 1928. (American edition: Paris: Salons, Cafes, Studios, J. B. Lippincott Company, 1928.)
- Articles de Paris: A Book of Essays, The Macmillan Company, 1928.
- Louis XIV in Love & in War, Harper & Brothers, 1929.
- Europe in Zigzags: Social, Artistic, Literary, and Political Affairs on the Continent, G.G. Harrap, 1929.
- Normandy: Its Charm, Its Curiosities, Its Antiquities, Its History, Its Topography, Doubleday, Doran & Company, Inc., 1929.
- A History of France, 1929.
- Between the River and the Hills: a Normandy pastoral, J. B. Lippincott Co., 1930.
- What's Right with America, J.B. Lippincott Company, 1930.
- Back To Montparnasse: Glimpses of Broadway in Bohemia, G.G. Harrap, 1931.
- The Captain's Table. A Transatlantic Log, J.B. Lippincott Co., 1932.
- War Unless, V. Gollancz, Ltd., 1933.
- In my Time: An Observer's Record of War and Peace, Cape, 1938.
- Cities and Men, by Charles Inman Barnard, E.P. Dutton & Co., 1940 [as editor].
- Free France and Britain. the Franco-British Companion, 1941 [edited by William G. Corp: contributor].
- Le Livre de Saint-Pierre. Vie, Mort et Renaissance d'un Village de France, 1942.
- Le Mythe de la Liberté – Entretiens en Temps de Guerre, H. Lardanchet, 1943.
- Terreur 1944, Témoignage d'un Embastillé, Éditions de la Couronne, 1947.
- Avec le Maréchal, 1948.
- Mediterranean Blue, Evans Bros., 1948.
- Petain, Patriot or Traitor?, A. Dakers, 1951.
- Popular Diplomacy and War, R.R. Smith Publisher, 1954.
- France: the Tragic Years, 1939–1947; an Eyewitness Account of War, Occupation, and Liberation, The Devin-Adair Company, 1955.
- Elisabeth d'Angleterre, Le Mystère d'une Reine Vierge, 1960.

=== Selected articles ===
- "The Last Bohemian", The Living Age, 11 January 1919.
- "Will Europe Go Bankrupt?", The Living Age, 13 March 1920.
- "French Cafes and French Poetry", The Living Age, 3 April 1920.
- "The Menace of the World," The Atlantic Monthly, Vol. 125, 1920.
- "A Conscience for the World," The Atlantic Monthly, Vol. 127, 1921.
- "Europe in the Melting Pot," The Atlantic Monthly, Vol. 130, 1922.
- "The Last Anglo-French Crisis", The Living Age, 7 October 1922.
- "The Road Ahead of Poincare", The Living Age, August 1928.
- "A French Hearst", The Living Age, October 1928.
