= Sava Stojkov =

Serbian painter (1925–2014)

Sava Stojkov Сава Стојков
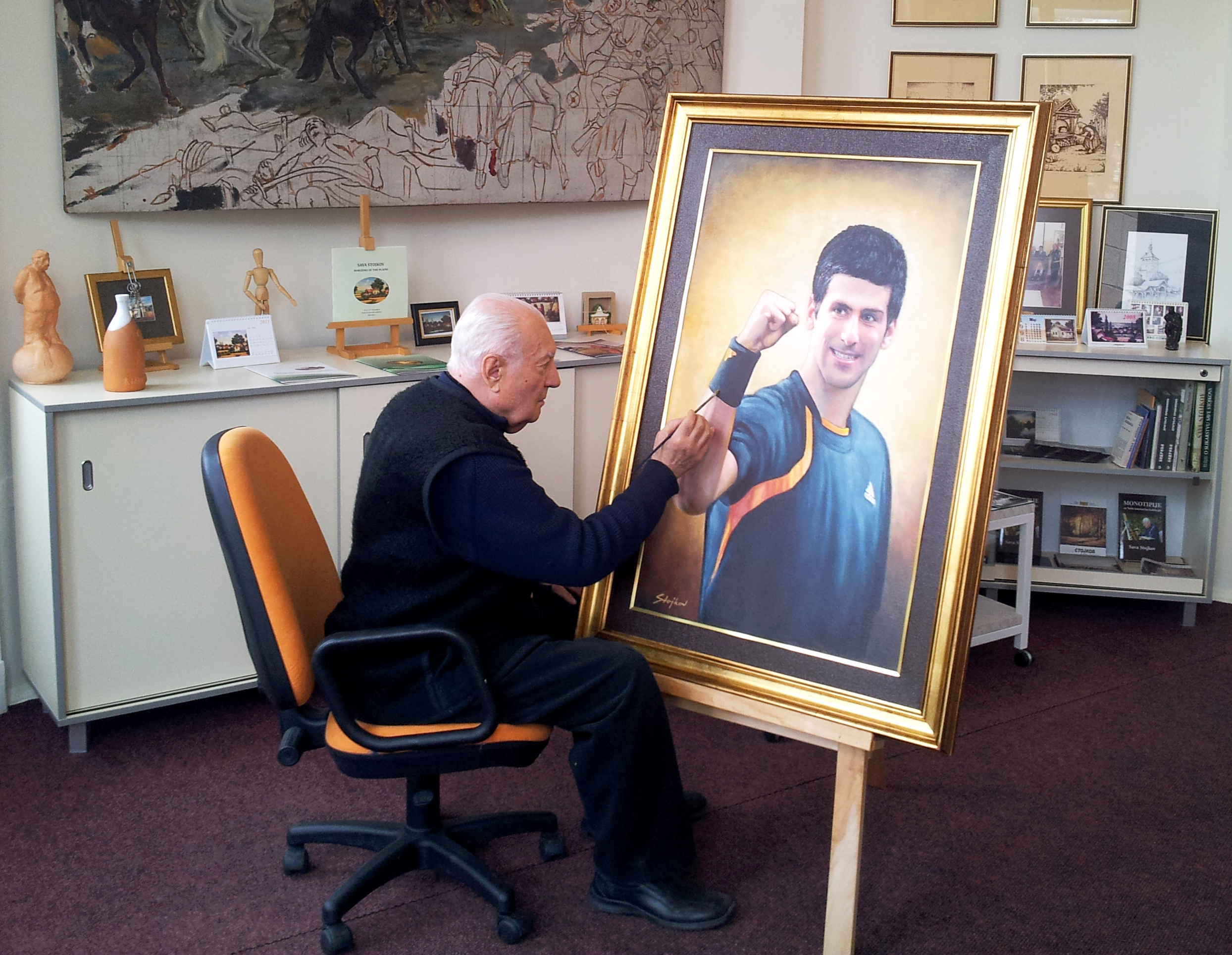
- Sava Stojkov finishing his portrait of Novak Djokovic
- Born: 29 March 1925 (Kingdom of Yugoslavia) Sombor, Kingdom SCS (modern Serbia)
- Died: 20 August 2014 (aged 89); Sombor, Serbia
- Known for: Painting

Sava Stojkov (Serbian Cyrillic: Сава Стојков; 29 March 1925 – 20 August 2014) was a Serbian naive art painter, known for his environment depictions, as well as for his pre-photorealistic tendencies.

== Biography ==
Sava Stojkov was born on 29 March 1925 in Sombor, Kingdom SHS (now Serbia), and began painting from an early age. His first individual exhibition took place in 1945. Since then he has exhibited individually at over 500 exhibitions in Serbia and the countries of former Yugoslavia, as well as in Italy, Austria, Switzerland, Germany, France, Spain, the United Kingdom, the Netherlands, Belgium, Sweden, Finland, the Czech Republic, Slovakia, Hungary, Romania, Russia, Cyprus, Monaco, the US, Japan, South Korea, India, Morocco and Venezuela. Stojkov has exhibited at over 650 group exhibitions and received over 40 awards for his work worldwide. Ten books, monographs and 12 painting maps were published about his art and a large number of documentary films, radio and television shows were recorded. Stojkov was one of the most popular painters in Serbia and in the region. He painted landscapes and plains of Vojvodina, portraits of its people, and occasionally worked in specific oil-on-glass technique. For his 85th birthday the Faculty of Education in Sombor opened the Gallery of Sava Stojkov, in the building of Preparandija, where a permanent retrospective exhibition takes is found, with more than 100 paintings made during the seven decades of his artistic career.

Sava Stojkov died on 20 August 2014. in Sombor.
