= Portrait of My Father =

1925 painting by Salvador Dalí

- Artist: Salvador Dalí
- Year: 1925
- Medium: Oil on canvas
- Dimensions: 104,5 cm × 104,5 cm (41.1 in × 41.1 in)
- Location: Museu Nacional d'Art de Catalunya; Barcelona

Portrait of My Father is an oil on canvas painting by Salvador Dalí, created in 1925, depicting his father, Salvador Rafael Aniceto Dalí Cusí. It is now in the National Art Museum of Catalonia, in Barcelona.

== History ==
Dalí held his first exhibition at the Galeries Dalmau in Barcelona in 1925, before making his first trip to Paris and moving towards Surrealism. This portrait is considered one of the best from his early period, even by Dalí himself, coinciding with his return to Figueres after his final expulsion from the Academy. Dalí focused on the severe expression of his face and especially in the piercing eyes. The portrait demonstrates the forceful character of his father, who was a notary in Figueres, and with whom he had a difficult relationship. The technical mastery the young painter had already achieved at this time can be noticed in the cleanly drawn outlines, the treatment of light and shade and the expressive power of the sombre tone.

The technical mastery of the young painter is demonstrated in the sharply drawn profile, the treatment of light and shadows, and in the expressive power of the sober tones. Dalí's work shows a man with character, imposing and majestic, depicted from a three-quarter perspective. His gaze is directed at the viewer sharply, as if he didn't wanted to lose sight of his bright and rebellious son.

The posture adopted by the father in this painting resembles the artist's Portrait of Father and Sister (1925); but in this case, he appears dressed with more informal clothing and holding a pipe.

== Exhibits ==
- 1925, Barcelona, Galeries Dalmau
- 1962, Madrid, Casón del Buen Retiro
- 1964, Tokyo, Tokyo Prince Hotel Gallery
- 1979, Paris, Centre Georges Pompidou, Musée National d'Art Moderne
- 1983, Madrid, Museo Español de Arte Contemporáneo
- 1985, London, Hayward Gallery
- 1986, Lausanne, Fondation de l'Hermitage
- 1987, Kobe, The Hyogo Prefectural Museum of Modern Art
- 1987, Barcelona, Palau de la Virreina
- 1989, Stuttgart, Staatsgalerie
- 1989, Humlebaek, Louisiana Museum of Modern Art
- 1994, London, Hayward Gallery
- 1998, Liverpool, Tate Gallery Liverpool
- 2004, Venezia, Palazzo Grassi
- 2007, London, Tate Modern
- 2007, Madrid, Museo Thyssen Bornemisza - Fundación Caja Madrid

== See also ==
- List of works by Salvador Dalí
