= The Birth of the World =

1925 painting by Joan Miró

- Artist: Joan Miró
- Year: 1925
- Medium: Oil on canvas
- Dimensions: 250.8 cm × 200 cm (98.7 in × 79 in)
- Location: Museum of Modern Art; New York

The Birth of the World is an oil painting by the Catalonian-Spanish artist Joan Miró, from 1925. It is held in the collection of the Museum of Modern Art, in New York. In 2019 the MOMA organized an eponymous exhibition of Miro's works curated around and including the canvas to offer a comparison between other major pieces by the artist and this seminal canvas.

Joan Miró’s collaboration with Surrealist poet André Breton, a leading figure of the movement, influenced the development of The Birth of the World.

The MOMA has described the process behind the creation of the work by stating that "Here Miró applied paint to an unevenly primed canvas in an unorthodox manner—pouring, brushing, and flinging—so that the paint soaked into the canvas in some places while resting on the surface in others. On top of this relatively uncontrolled application of paint, he added schematic lines and seemingly familiar shapes--a bird or kite, shooting star, balloon, and figure with white head--planned in preparatory studies. Miró once said that The Birth of the World describes "a sort of genesis," an amorphous beginning out of which life may take form".
