= James Bingham (artist) =

Northern Irish painter

- Born: 23 January 1925; Belfast, Northern Ireland
- Died: 8 December 2009 (aged 84); Belfast, Northern Ireland
- Spouse: Elizabeth 'Lily' Bingham née Humphries

James Bingham (23 January 1925 – 8 December 2009) was a Belfast-based painter. He spent thirty years in London working as a signwriter with his brother. In 1967 he returned to Belfast where he met fellow Belfast artist Daniel O'Neill. They became friends and from 1968 he worked with O'Neill in his studio until O'Neill's death in 1974.

Bingham was born in Belfast, Northern Ireland and died there in 2009, after a long illness.
