= Alessio Issupoff =

Russian and Soviet painter

- Born: March 10, 1889; Vyatka (Kirov), Russian Empire
- Died: July 17, 1957 (aged 68); Rome, Italy
- Education: Moscow School of Painting, Sculpture, and Architecture, Apollinary Vasnetsov, Valentin Serov, Konstantin Korovin
- Known for: Painting
- Notable work: "The Market by the Samarkand Mosque", "Samarkand" (1920–1921)
- Movement: Russian Impressionism, Orientalism
- Spouse: Tamara Nikolaevna
- Awards: Venice Biennale (1930)

Alessio Issupoff (1889–1957) was a Russian and Soviet painter known for his landscape paintings, portraits, and genre scenes. Born as Aleksej Vladimirovich Isupov in Vyatka (present-day Kirov), Issupoff became a prominent figure in both Russian and Italian art circles, achieving significant recognition at the Venice Biennale in 1930. His artistic career spanned from early twentieth-century Russia through the Soviet period and culminated in a prolific emigration to Italy, where he spent the latter half of his life.

== Biography ==
=== Early life and training ===
Alessio Issupoff was born on March 10, 1889, in Vyatka to a family with a strong artistic heritage. His father was an engraver and gilder of icons, and Issupoff received his initial artistic education from artisan painters working with his father. However, determined to pursue independent creative work, the young artist left Vyatka for Moscow to attend the prestigious Moscow School of Painting, Sculpture, and Architecture.

In Moscow, Issupoff benefited from mentorship by the painter Apollinary Vasnetsov, brother of the renowned historical painter Viktor Vasnetsov, who introduced him to Moscow's artistic circles and facilitated his professional development. At the School of Painting, Issupoff studied under several influential instructors who shaped his artistic vision. He received instruction from Valentin Serov, known for his rigorous approach to studying nature and artistic truth, and Konstantin Korovin, a master of Russian Impressionism. These teachers exposed Issupoff to contemporary Russian art, academic traditions, and the principles of European Impressionism. Following his graduation in 1912, Issupoff began traveling throughout the Ural region, broadening his artistic horizons through direct observation of Russian landscape and culture.

=== Central Asian period ===
In 1915, Issupoff was conscripted into military service and assigned to garrison in Tashkent during World War I. Rather than viewing this period as an interruption, Issupoff transformed his Central Asian posting into a profoundly creative phase. The landscape, light, and cultural richness of Turkestan, particularly around Samarkand, exerted a transformative influence on his artistic practice. He produced notable works during this period, including "Easter Night" (1916) and "In the Field-ambulance" (1917), which reflected both his observations of wartime conditions and his emerging mastery of color and light.

Following his discharge from military service in 1917 due to health issues, Issupoff returned to Moscow, where he painted Russian nature scenes such as "A Peasant with Wagon" (1917), "Evening Landscape" (1918), and "By the Monastery Mill" (1918). In May 1918, he returned to Tashkent and subsequently settled in Samarkand with his wife, Tamara Nikolaevna.

During his Samarkand years, Issupoff held the position of director of the Restoration and Conservation Committee for works of art and city monuments. This role allowed him to expand his knowledge of restoration techniques, archaeology, and architectural history. In addition to his directorial responsibilities, he conducted archaeological excavations, restored architectural reliefs, and created watercolor illustrations documenting the Committee's restoration work. His study of Central Asian ethnography, daily life, textiles, and household implements enriched his artistic vocabulary. He created compelling depictions of Samarkand's bustling markets, teahouses, blacksmith shops, and architectural landmarks, including notable works such as "The Market by the Samarkand Mosque" and "Samarkand" (1920–1921). During this period, Issupoff also mastered tempera painting on wooden panels, developing a technique that reflected his deep engagement with traditional icon-painting methods and Oriental miniature painting. He created works that demonstrated his ability to achieve harmonious color combinations and luminous surfaces through careful layering of translucent pigments.

=== Return to Moscow and Soviet period ===
In 1921, Issupoff returned to Moscow, marking the beginning of a challenging period in his personal and professional life. Facing severe economic hardship during the early Soviet period, he was compelled to work as an official Soviet artist, producing portraits of Communist leaders and propagandistic scenes depicting Soviet achievements and Red Army life. This "regime art" work provided financial support but offered limited creative satisfaction. Apollinary Vasnetsov, his early mentor, again assisted him by securing a salaried position within one of Moscow's cultural committees.

=== Emigration to Italy and career maturity ===
Increasingly afflicted by health problems in the mid-1920s, Issupoff traveled to Italy in 1926 seeking restoration of his physical well-being. Italy, however, became the decisive turning point in both his personal and artistic life—a place of rebirth and liberation. The artistic community received him warmly, and Italian critics and connoisseurs quickly recognized his talent. His first solo exhibition, organized in Rome in 1926, met with critical and public acclaim. Numerous subsequent exhibitions throughout Italy's principal cities followed, establishing his reputation throughout the peninsula.

In 1930, Issupoff achieved international artistic recognition when his work was prominently featured in the 17th Venice Biennale, an honor that represented the pinnacle of his career. This recognition marked his full acceptance into European artistic circles and secured his status as a significant painter of his era.

Issupoff chose not to return to the Soviet Union. His Italian paintings, created from memory and imagination, reconstructed the Russia of his childhood and youth—specifically the pre-revolutionary Russia he had known, rather than the contemporary Soviet state. As his wife observed, "Turkestan was a wonderful place for Isupov's true art. As an artist of the Russian school, he found there everything that he was looking for: the light, the sun, the shadows." His works from the Italian period reflect deep nostalgia for his homeland, featuring misty heaths, freezing landscapes, snow-covered countryside, silver-trunked birches obscured by fog, grazing horses, sleighs (troikas), and plows—all rendered with the emotional intensity of remembered experience.

=== Later life ===
In Italy, Issupoff enjoyed esteem, financial security, and complete artistic freedom—conditions he had lacked in the Soviet Union. He maintained an exceptionally prolific output, participating regularly in exhibitions and establishing strong relationships with Italian critics and artistic circles. Critics particularly noted his "wide brushstroke, fine detail, striving towards the truth," while his work was most widely admired for its "gentleness of colour."

However, in his later years, unrelenting nostalgia combined with persistent health problems led to depression and social withdrawal. In his final years, Issupoff rarely attended exhibitions held in his honor and painted very little. He died in Rome on July 17, 1957, and was buried in the Testaccio cemetery, Rome's historic burial ground for non-Catholic foreigners.

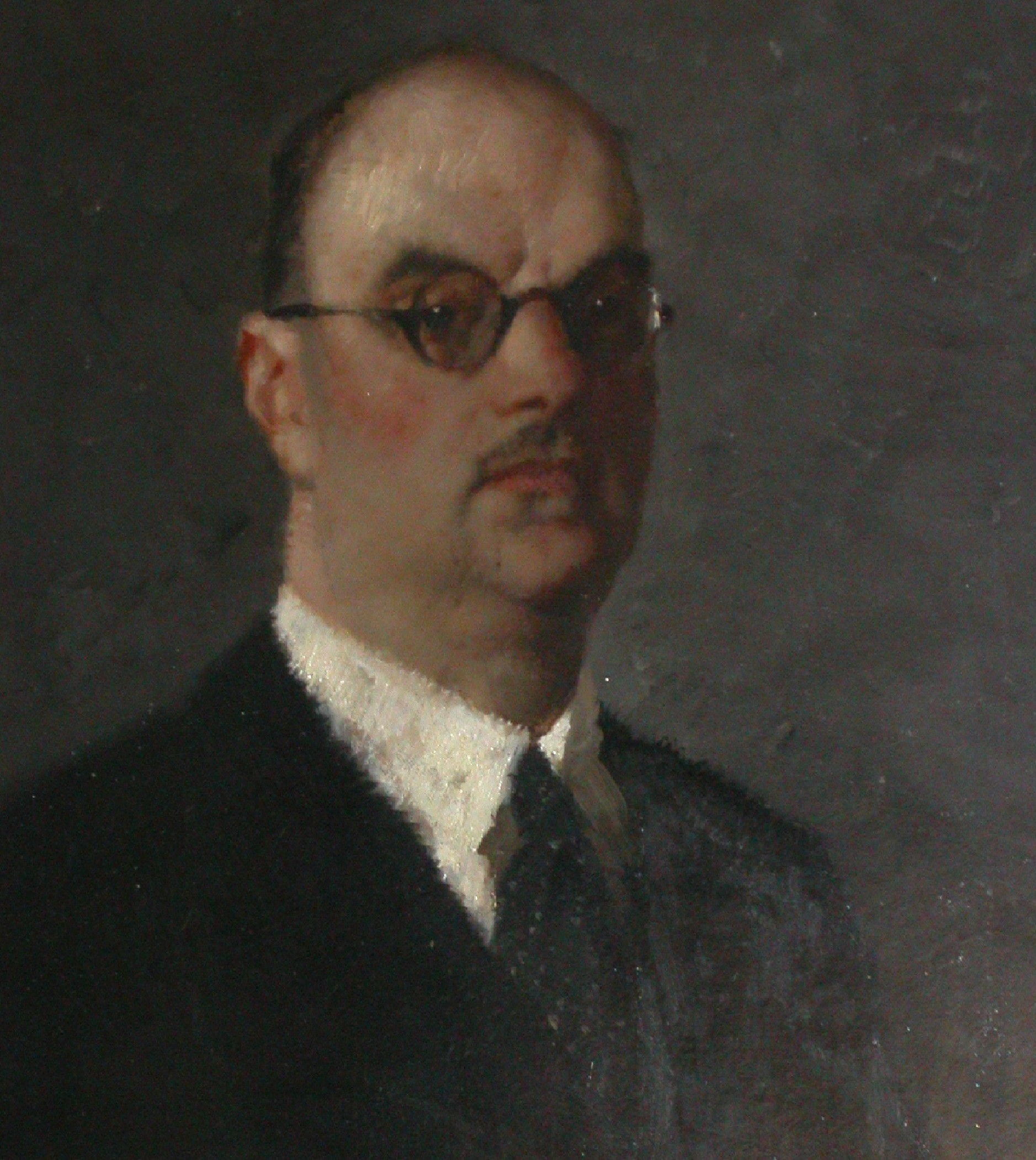
Portrait of Michele Biancale

== Artistic style and characteristics ==
Issupoff's artistic approach emphasized broad brushwork and privileged color over linear drawing, reflecting his intention to capture the spirit and essence of his subjects rather than their objective physical details. As a young painter, he might have been classified as an Orientalist painter, but his mature practice centered primarily on portraiture and landscape painting. His subjects included Russian places and faces throughout his career—even his Italian paintings often displayed Slavic features and transformed Italian landscapes into Russian scenery.

Issupoff's work is situated "among the masters who drew from Impressionism the norm of an open and breathing painting of light." His engagement with Impressionist principles appears in his use of quick, visible brushstrokes and attention to light effects, creating effects of vibrating air and luminosity. The Italian art critic Giorgio Nicodemi noted that Issupoff's horses—frequent subjects in his work—were "those of the Russian peasants or small owners, attached to carts or mounted by riders of genuine skill," reflecting his commitment to authentic representation of rural life.

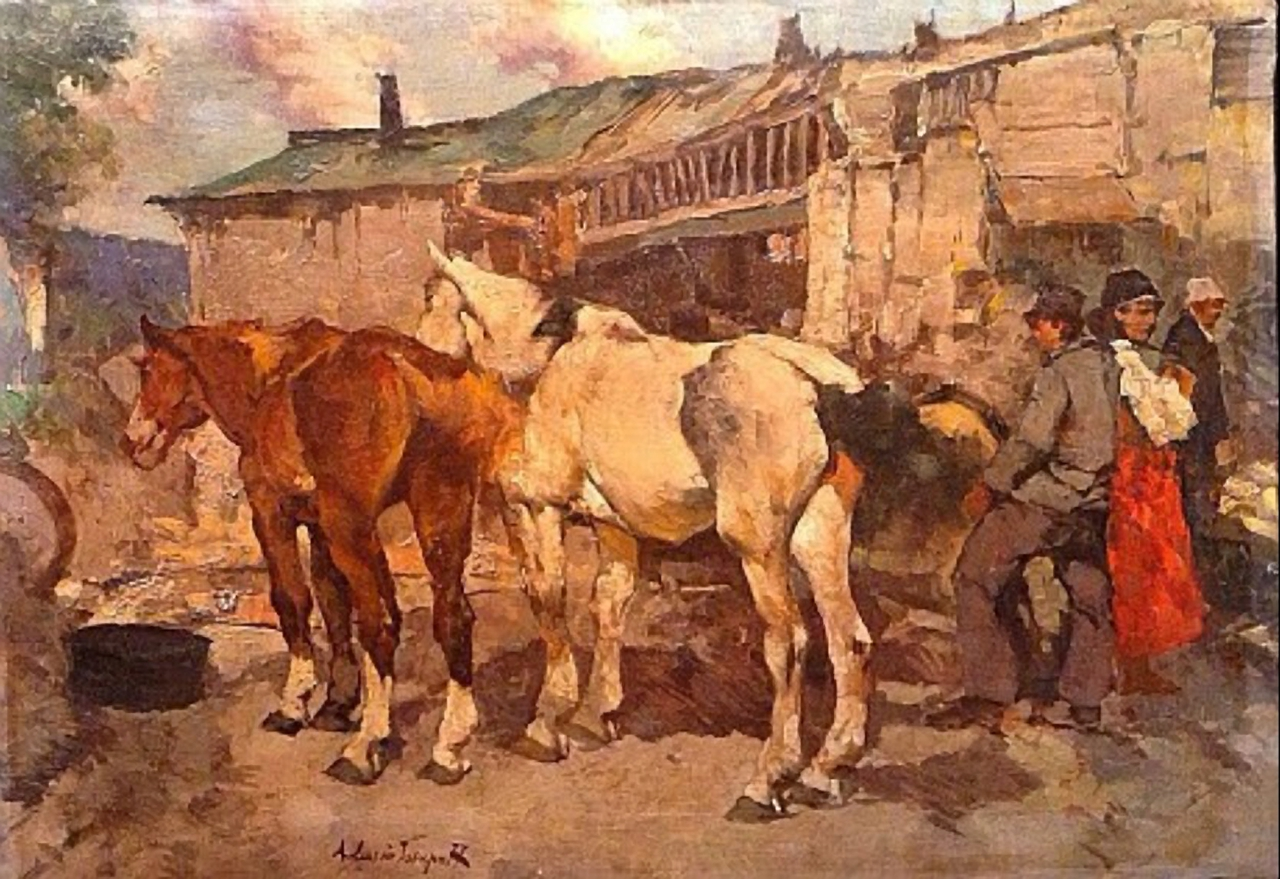

== Legacy and collections ==
Nine years after her husband's death, in 1966, Tamara Nikolaevna Isupova returned to Russia carrying the artistic legacy her husband had left behind. In accordance with Issupoff's wishes, she donated a substantial portion of his works to the Viktor and Apollinary Vasnetsov Kirov Regional Art Museum (known as the Vyatka Art Museum), the preeminent museum in the artist's native city. The Kirov museum now houses the most comprehensive collection of Issupoff's artistic heritage, comprising works spanning his entire career from his Russian period through his extensive Italian production. Additional works by Issupoff are preserved in Russian provincial museums, the Tretyakov Gallery in Moscow, Italian museums, and private collections throughout Europe and the United States.

== Exhibitions ==
Issupoff's first solo exhibition, held in Rome in 1926, inaugurated his position in Italian artistic circles. Subsequent exhibitions in major Italian cities followed, establishing his national reputation throughout the peninsula. Between 1928 and 1929, his paintings were exhibited in Rome and Milan, receiving appreciative recognition from art critics and connoisseurs. His participation in the 17th Venice Biennale in 1930 represented the international climax of his career, securing his recognition as a significant artist of the era. Throughout his Italian residence, Issupoff maintained consistent popularity, participating regularly in both solo and collective national and international exhibitions. His work continued to excite viewers with "its sincerity and emotional truthfulness," making him an outstanding phenomenon in Russian and world art.
