= Antoshin =

Antoshin (feminine: Antoshina) is a Russian-language surname. Notable people with the surname include:

- Tania Antoshina (born 1956), French-Russian artist
- Tatiana Antoshina (born 1982), Russian road bicycle racer
- Vladimir Antoshin (1929–1994), Soviet chess grandmaster and theoretician

== See also ==
- Antoshkin
