= Valeriy Igoshev =

Expert in attributing ancient liturgical books and Russian metal art

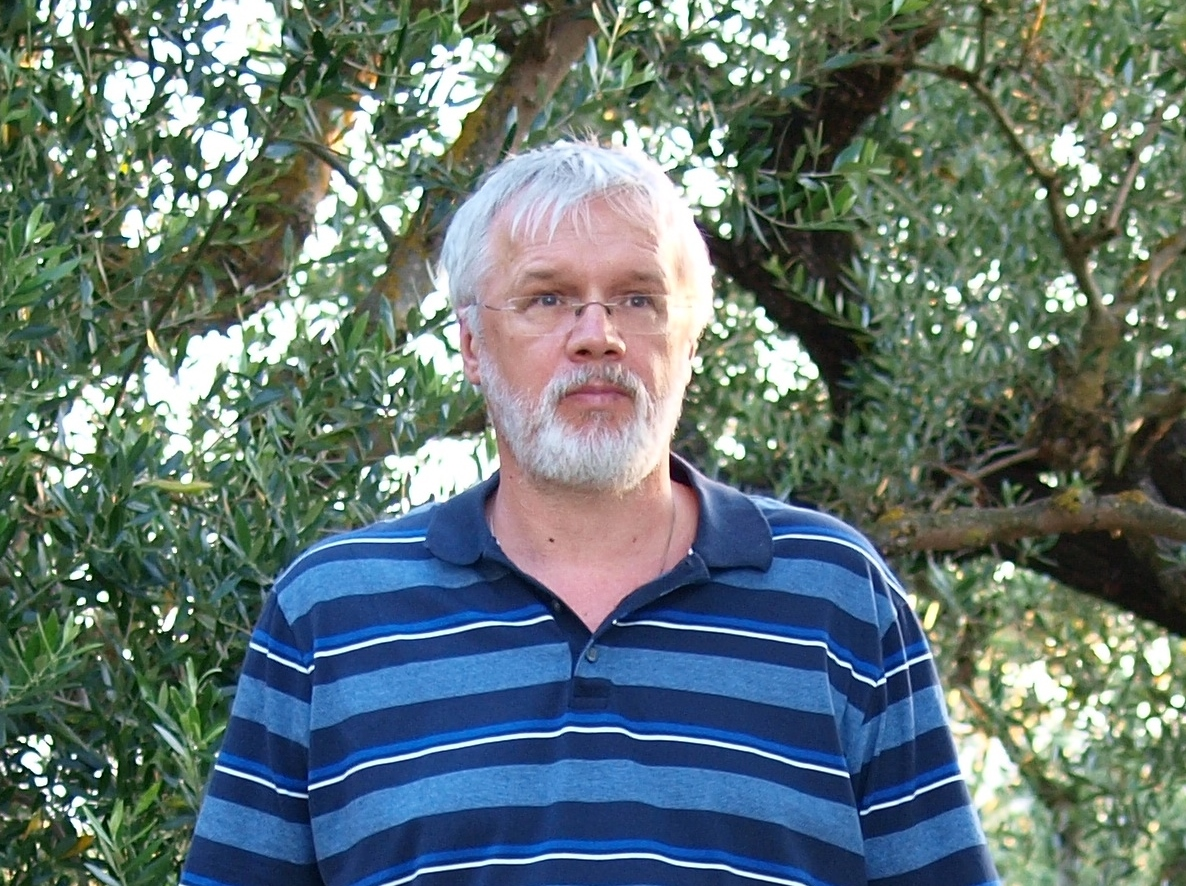
- Igoshev in 2012
- Born: 4 March 1956 (age 70); Moscow, Russia
- Citizenship: Russia
- Education: Stroganov Moscow State Academy of Arts and Industry
- Known for: Metal art restorer of the highest qualification
- Scientific career
- Fields: Medieval studies, Art history, Restoration, Iconography, Museology
- Workplaces: State Research Institute of the Art Restorations in Moscow

Valeriy Victorovich Igoshev (born March 4, 1956, Moscow, Russia; Russian: Игошев, Валерий Викторович) is a Russian scientist. He is a lead researcher in the Department of Manuscripts of the State Research Institute of the Art Restorations in Moscow. His expertise is in attributing ancient liturgical books and Russian metal art from the 14th to 20th centuries.

== Biography ==
In 1990, Valeriy Igoshev graduated from the Russian school for industrial, monumental, and decorative art and design, the Stroganov Moscow State University of Arts and Industry, as a specialist in Metal Art.

He earned his PhD in 1994 from MVHPU S.G. Stroganov, specialty: state code 17.00.05 - arts, crafts, and architecture, and became Doctor of Science (D.Sc.) in 2008: MGHPU S.G. Stroganov (specialty: state code 17.00.04 - fine, decorative and applied arts and architecture). Since 1978, he has been a researcher at the State Research Institute of Art Restorations.

Igoshev has taught and participated in the creation of training programs for art restorers in several educational institutions:

- Suzdal Art Restorations School (1982);
- Moscow State Art and Industry University, S.G. Stroganov (2002–2008),
- Russian Academy of Painting, Sculpture and Architecture (2003–2006).
- Courses on the art of jewelry in the Research University School of Economics (2010–2014).

== Scientific activity ==
Valeriy Igoshev's research areas are the restoration and reconstruction of ancient art, historical objects, icons, church utensils, and temple decorations. He has participated in various research projects and scientific expeditions:

- "Metal Art of the 16th and 17th centuries. Novgorod the Great "(1998–2008);
- "Russian Icons on Sinai" (2004–2011);
- "Antiquities of the Old Believers" (2004–2005);
- "Russian church utensils and works of art in Greece" (2010–2012);
- "Icons of the Russian Modern" (2014–2015).

Igoshev has written over 200 articles about precious collections and participant in the collective monographs and catalogues.
