= Vladimir Semenikhin (designer) =

- Владимир Ильич Семенихин
- Born: February 4, 1956 (age 70)
- Citizenship: USSR, Russia
- Education: Moscow Art School of 1905 (1974); Stroganov Moscow State Academy of Arts and Industry (1981)
- Occupation: Artist
- Style: Graphic design, book design

Vladimir Ilyich Semenikhin (professionally also known by the nickname Syoma; born 4 February 1956) is a Soviet and Russian graphic designer, book artist, and publisher. Founder (1995) and president of the design studio Samolyot (“Airplane”). Researcher of Russian children’s book illustration.

== Biography ==
Vladimir Semenikhin was born on 4 February 1956.

In 1974, he graduated from the Moscow Art School of 1905; in 1981, he graduated from the Stroganov Moscow State Academy of Arts and Industry (formerly the Stroganov School), specializing in industrial graphics and packaging design. At the Stroganov School, he met Vladimir Chaika, who was a year ahead of him and influenced his artistic development. During his student years, Semenikhin acquired the nickname Syoma, derived from his surname; it has remained in professional use ever since.

After graduating from the Stroganov School, following Vladimir Chaika, he was assigned to the Creative Workshop of Applied Graphics at the Graphic Arts Combine of the Moscow City Branch of the Art Fund of the RSFSR (the Industrial Graphics Workshop, “Promgrafika”), where 200–300 “free artists” worked under an artistic council that included Valery Akopov, Mikhail Anikst, Maxim Zhukov, Evgeny Dobrovinsky, Andrei Kryukov, Boris Trofimov, and Arkady Troyanker. At Promgrafika, Semenikhin developed, among other projects, the corporate identity of the Technoexport association. By the late 1980s, the number of commissions at Promgrafika sharply declined and were mainly assigned to senior designers. Among former clients, Vneshtorgizdat continued to commission him directly. Later, Semenikhin worked at the publishing house Sovetsky Khudozhnik and in Mikhail Anikst’s workshop.

In 1990, Semenikhin founded his own studio, Tim Design. From 1993 to 1995, he co-directed the studio Direct Design (together with Dmitry Pyryshkov and Leonid Feygin). In 1995, he founded and became president of the design studio Samolyot. To visually reinforce the name “Airplane,” Semenikhin installed a stylized porthole window in the attic of a sixth-floor Stalin-era building where the studio is located.

Semenikhin curated a number of exhibitions and actively participated in design conferences and symposia, including the Golden Bee festival. In 1997, he organized the design initiative “Think About the High”.

He is the author of the logo and corporate identity for the companies Sedmoi Kontinent (the original design has since been changed) and Comstar (design later replaced).

The Samolyot design studio published several books by Vladimir Krychevsky on the history of Soviet design, including A Book on the Graphic Design of Nizhny Novgorod Printing in the 1920s (20th Century) and Briefly About What Followed; Cover: The Graphic Face of the Era of Revolutionary Onslaught, 1917–1937; and Borr: A Book About a Forgotten Designer of the Twenties and Much More, Including the Design Features of This Very Book.

For the centenary of Daniil Kharms in 2005, Samolyot published the album Figures of Time, with contributions by Kharms scholar Valery Sazhin. Many of the album’s materials were published for the first time. The studio also published poetry books by the poet Alexei Korolyov (This; No. TM).

In 2009, the publishers Samolyot and Uley, under Semenikhin’s supervision, released the two-volume monograph The Illustrated Children’s Book in the History of Russia, 1881–1939, which includes 1,800 reproductions, extensive reference material, 190 short biographies, and a glossary. The book resulted from Semenikhin’s research into Russian children’s book illustration, begun in 2004. A significant portion of the materials was discovered in private collections in the United States.

An exhibition titled Without Borders. The World of Children’s Illustration was held at the KultProekt Gallery in Moscow from 19 September to 19 October 2009 in conjunction with the book’s presentation. In 2012, Semenikhin curated the exhibition Experimental Art of Russian Children’s Books, 1899–1939 (New York).

== Membership in Professional and Public Organizations ==
Member of the Union of Artists of Russia (since 1989)

Member of the Union of Designers of Russia (since 1990)

== Awards and Prizes ==
=== Personal Awards ===
1989 — First Prize at the All-Union Calendar Competition

1990 — Award at the European advertising competition Epica (Paris)

2004 — Special Diploma of the competition The Art of the Book. Traditions and Innovations

=== Awards of the Design Studio Samolyot ===
1996 — Silver Medal at the exhibition Label and Packaging

1997 — Special Diploma at the competition Best Business Cards of Russia

1997 — First Prize at the Moscow International Advertising Festival

2001 — First Prize at the Moscow International Advertising Festival

2004 — First Prize at the Brand of the Year competition

2005 — Second Prize at the Grand Label competition

2005 — Borr: A Book About a Forgotten Designer of the Twenties… by Vladimir Krychevsky (published in 2004) was named “Best Graphic Object” in the ranking of World Paper magazine

2009 — Grand Prix of the All-Russian Book Illustration Competition Image of the Book (for The Illustrated Children’s Book in the History of Russia, 1881–1939)

== Bibliography ==
- Детская иллюстрированная книга в истории России. 1881—1939: В 2-х томах / Текст: Д. Фомин, Е. Пиггот; Составители Л. Ершова и В. Семенихин; Главный редактор Н. Верлинская. — М.: Самолёт, Улей, 2009. — 500 экз. — ISBN 978-5-91529-006-7.
