= Stroganov Moscow State Academy of Arts and Industry =

Art school in Moscow, Russia

Russian State University of Design and Applied Arts (Stroganov University)
- Российский государственный художественно-промышленный университет имени С. Г. Строганова
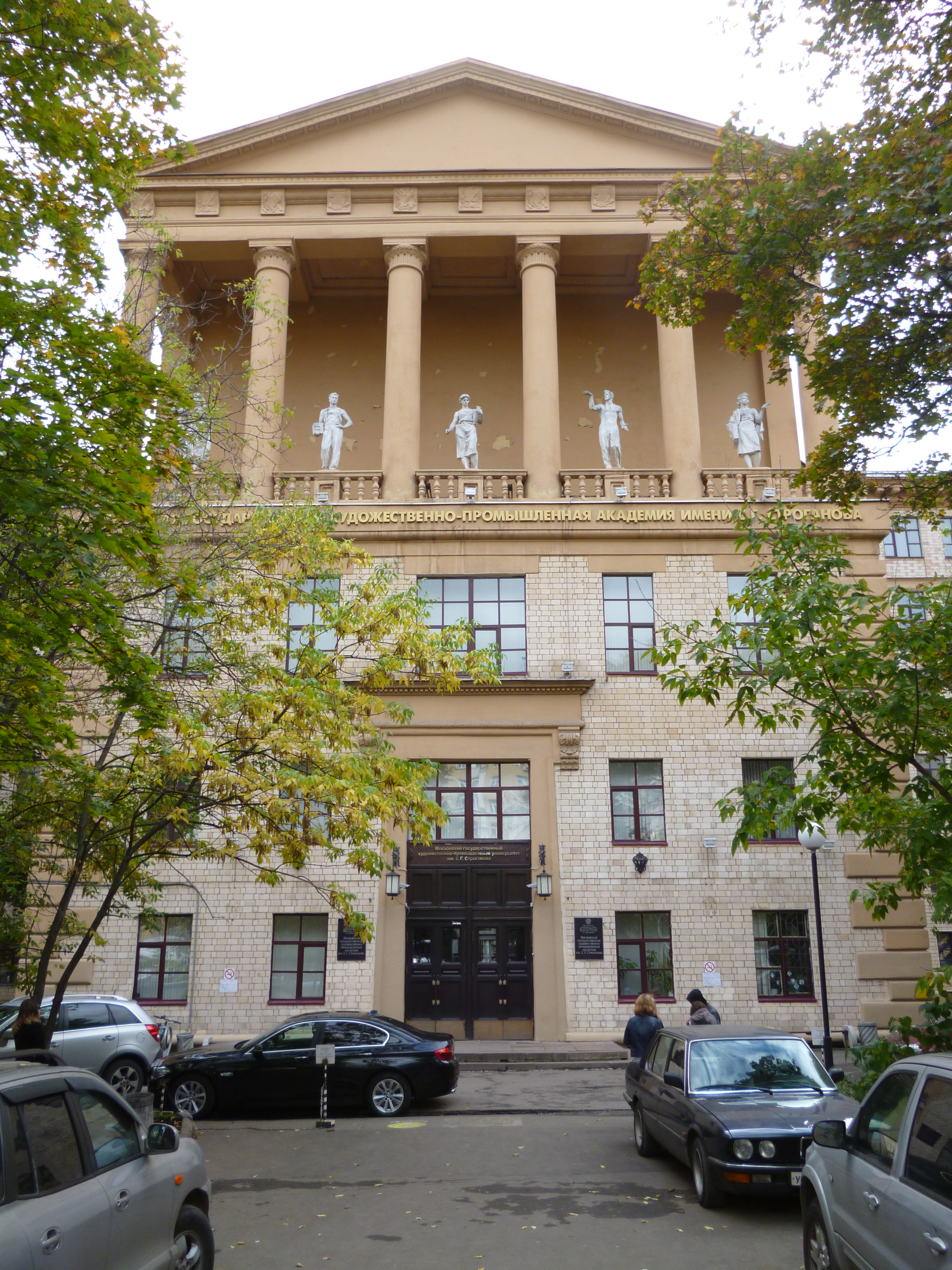
- Former names: Moscow State Stroganov Academy of Industrial and Applied Arts, Moscow School of Painting, Sculpture and Architecture
- Type: College
- Established: 1825
- Location: 9 Volokolamskoye Avenue, Moscow, Russia; 55°48′25″N 37°29′53″E
- Website: академия-строганова.рф

Russian State University of Design and Applied Arts (Stroganov University) (Russian: Российский государственный художественно-промышленный университет имени С. Г. Строганова) informally named Stroganovka (Строгановка) is one of the oldest Russian schools for the industrial, monumental and decorative art and design. The university is named after its founder, baron Sergei Grigoriyevich Stroganov.

== History ==
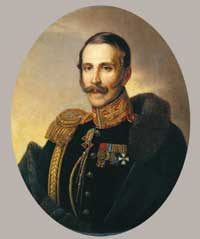
Baron Sergei Grigoriyevich Stroganov, the founder of the school

The school was founded in 1825 by Baron Sergey Stroganov. It specialised on the applied and decorative art. In 1843 the school became state-owned. In 1860 it was renamed Stroganov School for Technical Drawing.

=== First Free State Art Workshops ===
After the October Revolution the school was reorganized and became one of the SVOMAS, known as the First Free State Art Workshops.

=== Later changes ===
Since 1930 it became the Moscow Institute for the Decorative and Applied Arts (Московский Институт Декоративного и Прикладного Искусства), MIDIPI (МИДИПИ). In 1945, after the end of the World War II the school was restored as an applied art educational establishment. Since 1996 the school was named Moscow State Stroganov University of Industrial and Applied Arts. In 2009 the school got its present name Moscow State Stroganov Academy of Industrial and Applied Arts (Russian: Московская Государственная Художественно-Промышленная Академия им. С.Г. Строганова).

Currently it is one of the most diverse artistic schools in Russia. It has three departments and thirteen chairs preparing students of six major and sixteen minor specializations.

== Notable faculty and students ==
- Aleksandr Adabashyan
- Mikhail Mikhailovich Adamovich
- André Andrejew
- Tania Antoshina
- Sergei Gerasimov
- Valeriy Igoshev
- Konstantin Korovin
- Nikolai Kuzmin
- Nikolai Pomansky
- Vladimir Semenikhin
- Dmitry Shcherbinovsky
- Alexey Shchusev
- Vikentii Trofimov
- Mikhail Vrubel
