= Vikentii Trofimov =

Russian painter

Vikentii Pavlovich Trofimov (Russian: Викентий Павлович Трофимов; November 24, 1878 in Talizky Zavod, Yekaterinburgsky Uyezd, Perm Governorate – February 10, 1956 in Zagorsk, Sergiyevo-Posadsky District, Moscow Oblast) was a Russian painter.

== The Trofimov family ==
Trofimov was descended from a family of Siberian Cossacks, explorers and merchants. His father Pavel Trofimov was a well-known ship-owner; his partners and he decided to restart merchant navigation through the famous Northern Sea Route and fairs in Mangazeya (the ancient merchant town). For this purpose in 1911 the famous Fridtjof Nansen had been invited to investigate the river basin of the Ob River, and Pavel Trofimov was among the sponsors of this project. There were ten children in Trofimov's family, and every one became a well-educated person.

== Graduation from Stroganovka ==
In 1899 Vikentii Trofimov graduated from Stroganov Central College of Technical Drawing (now Stroganov Moscow State University of Arts and Industry, informally named Stroganovka). He and his friend Ignaty Nivinsky were both recommended for the gold medal. As there was only one gold medal, the two friends instead were encouraged to travel and teach abroad, and they agreed. A little later Trofimov married Ignaty's sister Vera, a very talented person with abilities in theatre. Trofimov continued his painting education in the private school of Zhukovsky and Halyavin, and travelled extensively in Europe.

== Early career ==
In 1900 Trofimov started his pedagogical work at his alma mater, then continued as director of one of its branches. From 1903-1905 he worked as a painter and as the director of the domestic department of Sudga Zemstvo (a form of local government). There his first son, Ignaty, was born. Later the family lived in Moscow for several years and Trofimov taught watercolour painting in private school. From 1909-1911 he was headmaster of the Stroganovka branch in Sergiyev Posad.

From 1911 to 1922 the family lived in Voronezh, where Trofimov was headmaster of Kolomenkin Art school, another branch of Stroganovka. The beginning of the First World War, Nicholas II of Russia visited Voronezh, and Trofimov made a sketch dedicated this visit. The sketch is now kept in the State Historical Museum of Russia. Some paintings from this period of Trofimov's life are kept in the Voronezh Museum of local lore as well. In spite of living in a small town, Trofimov continually took part in many art exhibitions such as All-Russian contests of art trade in Moscow and St. Petersburg from 1900–1916 and was awarded first prizes. In 1918 his painting "Boys Bathers" was sold during the first day of the show in Moscow.

== Old Voronezh ==
At the beginning of 1920 Vikentii Trofimov was invited to take part in very interesting work. Professor Uspenskiy created a Committee of Archeology (the predecessor of the Community of Saving of Art Monuments) and this Committee invited some painters (locals as well as famous painters such as Apollinary Vasnetsov) to draw old places of the town in order to save them for the future. Trofimov painted some works about the Old Voronezh. For this task he studied archive documents in order to recreate monuments which were no longer in existence at the time. His painting "Uspenskaya Church and the houses of Aleksandr Danilovich Menshikov and Apraksin in Peter the Great Period" drew on the ancient prints and other works kept in the Ivan Kramskoi Museum in Voronezh. These works were also published in the book "Old Voronezh" by Prof. Uspenskiy. Much later, in March 1986 on the Conference of Regional Studies in Voronezh, an address on Trofimov was presented as well as a show of his works. Some articles about his art were published; for example, there is a little citation: "The painter Vikentii Trovimov mostly worked in his favourite watercolour technique though he was able to paint in oil in the same light and transparent manner. His style was honoured by Igor Grabar, who described the paintings by Trofimov as documentary and pictorial portraits of architectural monuments which were correct down to the number of bricks".

== Omsk ==
In 1924 the Trofimov family moved to Omsk. Trofimov was a headmaster of the painting branch of Mikhail Vrubel Art School, and additionally he became a director of the New Siberia branch. In Omsk he painted such works as "Near the crossing of Irtysh", "Ob River near Belokurikha", "The Spring in Omsk Creek" and others. Among them, he created a number of monumental works in the public houses. In the 1930s the portrait of his young son Lev under the name "Our Relief" was published as a postcard by Association of the Painters of the Revolution; 25,000 copies were made.

Vikentii Trofimov was a fine yachtsman and he passed this love to his children. His knowledge of sea-skills gave him the ability to draw sailors with a high degree of accuracy not usually seen in paintings of seascapes.

== Zagorsk ==
In 1932 the Trofimov family moved to Moscow. There Trofimov painted on a heroic scale, including the decorated ceiling of the main staircase in the Soviet Army House, decorated ceilings of the White Hall of Mossovet and Shchusev Museum of Architecture, etc.

At the end of the 1930s the family moved to Zagorsk. There Trofimov took part in the very complex and important restoration works in Troitse-Sergiyeva Lavra, together with his son Ignaty who was invited as general director and architecture restorer. Vikentii Trofimov created art reconstructions of the monuments of Troitse-Sergiyeva Lavra based on the working drawings made by his son. His reconstructions include "Holy Spirit Church and Trinity Cathedral. Perspective view eastwards"; "Holy Spirit Church. Perspective view south-west"; "Hospital Wards and Church of Zosima and Savvaty. Perspective view south-east"; "Refectory. Perspective view north-east"; "Refectory. Section according to east-west axis" and others; these were published in the book written by his son

Vikentii Trofimov didn't stop his easel painting and constantly took part in art exhibitions. On August 23, 1955, he presented a solo exhibition in Zagorsk Preserve Museum. All his masterpieces were presented, from the earliest works to the latest sketches. The main part of the exhibition consisted of the paintings dedicated to Troitse-Sergiyeva Lavra. The catalogue was published with the comment that "the watercolors may serve as documents for the future investigator of Old Russian architecture, so precisely is every detail trimmed up".

== Impact ==
The heritage of Vikentii Trofimov is not currently studied. His archive in 1990-1991 was shown in the Tyumen Art Museum and his paintings are kept in many other museums of the Russian Federation. He brought up a lot of pupils in various fields of easel, monumental and applied paintings as well in art manufacture, and his children were first among his pupils. Lev and Valentina became well-known painters, and Valentina collaborated with her famous uncle Ignaty Nivinsky. Ignaty Trofimov, the general director of restoration of Troitse-Sergiyeva Lavra, the honourable citizen of Sergiyevo-Posadsky District, a member of the Architectural Society, devoted his book to his father. He wrote: "The author revered his father's memory with particular gratitude. The painter Vikentii Pavlovich Trofimov from the years 1938 till 1956 had lived and worked in Troitse-Sergiyeva Lavra and was adviser and leader of the author. His deep knowledge of art and architecture, his creative activities strongly expressed in his paintings, and his love for Russia gave the author the constant model in creation and the author is obliged to the model of all positive things he has in his work."

In spite of his bright and productive activity, Vikentii Trofimov had no titles and ranks as he was a non-Party man and so had been kept in the background during the Communist period.

In 2007, on the XXIII Antiq Saloon, the art exhibition of Vikentii Trofimov was presented by Shishkin Gallery.

Works by Vikentii Trofimov are known and claimed as well abroad. In 2007 Christie's sold one of his early paintings, "The Descent in Voronezsh," and in 2008 another of his pictures, "Kazakhs with a horse at a crossing," was sold through Christie's.
