= Nikolai Kuzmin (artist) =

Russian painter (born 1938)

- Николай Кузьмин
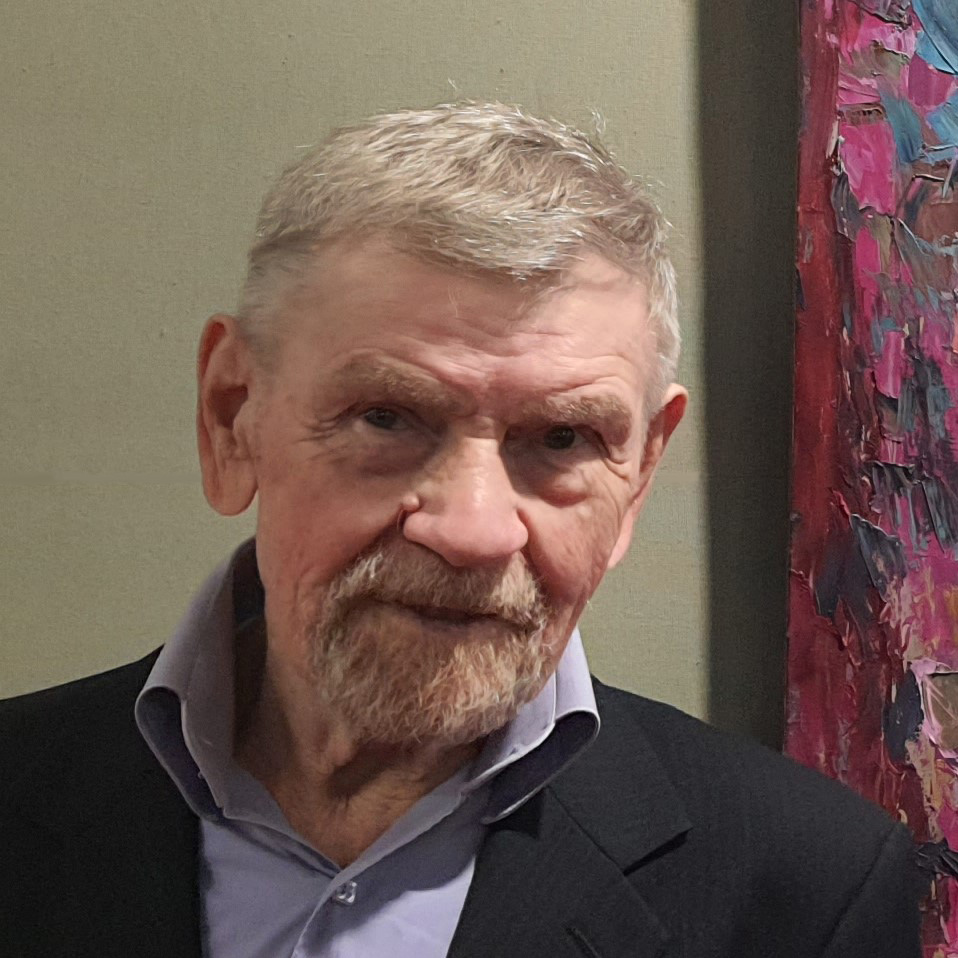
- Born: 1938 (age 87–88); Talynskoye, Vachsky District, Gorky Oblast, Russian SFSR, Soviet Union
- Education: Stroganov Moscow State University of Arts and Industry
- Known for: Painting
- Website: https://kuzmin.art

Nikolai Vasilievich Kuzmin (Russian: Николай Васильевич Кузьмин; born 1938) is a Russian painter. After studying in the Art College of Pavlovo-na-Oke, close to his home village Talynskoye, he entered the Stroganov Moscow State University of Arts and Industry and became an alumni in 1970. In 1991 he entered the Artists' Union of the USSR, which became in 1992 the Union of Russian Artists.

The painter has travelled and painted widely in Western Europe and organised some exhibitions there, notably in France. The artist's paintings are available in the Matthieu Dubuc gallery in Rueil-Malmaison, in the vicinity of Paris-La Défense. The artist's exhibitions take place in galleries, museums and annual exhibitions organised in common by artists, such as Art Capital or Souvenir de Corot in Paris and its neighbourhood. The artist has been participating for many years in the Watercolour and Drawing Annual Exhibition in Grand Palais and in Grand Palais Éphémère, Paris, France. Every year from 2022 onwards, also at Art Capital, Nikolai Kuzmin took part at Grand Palais Éphémère and at Grand Palais in the 'Salon Comparaisons' annual exhibition, together with the 'Ut pictura poesis' and later 'Inevitable Figuration' groups of artists, of which he is a member, both successively led by the painter Carole Melmoux.

Nikolai Kuzmin also has regular exhibitions in Russia, notably with the Moscow Union of artists, of which he is a member. In 2024, Nikolai Kuzmin became an honorary member of the Russian Academy of Arts.

== Artwork ==
Nikolai Kuzmin's favourite painting technique is oil on canvas with spatula.

Nikolai Kuzmin's painting is not far from expressionism and fauvism.

The painter's work has been strongly influenced by the remembrance of his childhood.

Nikolai Kuzmin likes painting the architecture of his home town Moscow. He also paints the landscapes he observes during his travels, like on the island of Korčula in Croatia.

The themes covered by Nikolai Kuzmin's paintings are varied:

- Garden-spring-blooming
- Artwork on paper / On the road to Murom-the Farewell
- Abstract oil artwork / Interlacing of roads
- Portrait
- After the war
- Travel:

○ Paris Region:

- Ponds of Corot
- Forest of Fausses Repose
- Versailles-Viroflay
- Around Paris
- Paris

○ French Province:

- Mediterranean
- Corsica
- Sainte-Victoire-Mountain
- The Alps
- Brittany
- Normandy
- Other French regions

○ Croatia
○ Crimea

- Native soil
- At the dacha
- Architecture:

○ Moscow
○ Russia
○ Western Europe (Denmark, United Kingdom, Germany, Belgium)

- Landscape:

○ Russian landscape
○ Russian winter landscape
○ Western Europe (Denmark, United Kingdom, Germany, Belgium)

- Religious, popular and mythological:

○ Religious
○ Popular
○ Mythological

- Still life and Flowers:

○ Still life
○ Flowers

- Other themes
