= Nikolai Pomansky =

Russian artist

Nikolai Pomansky (1887−1935) was a Russian painter and graphic artist who produced propaganda posters and postcards.

He studied under Konstantin Korovin and Sergei Ivanov at the Stroganov School for Technical Drawing (later Stroganov Moscow State Academy of Arts and Industry), in Moscow. Then in 1904 he went to Paris. Here he continued his education at the École des Beaux-Arts, Académie Colarossi and Siemens. He returned to Russia to teach painting spending four years in Vetluga and Kazan.

He joined the Army in 1914 and welcomed the revolution in 1917. During the Russian Civil War he primarily worked at producing posters. He later returned to painting and book illustration.

== Gallery ==
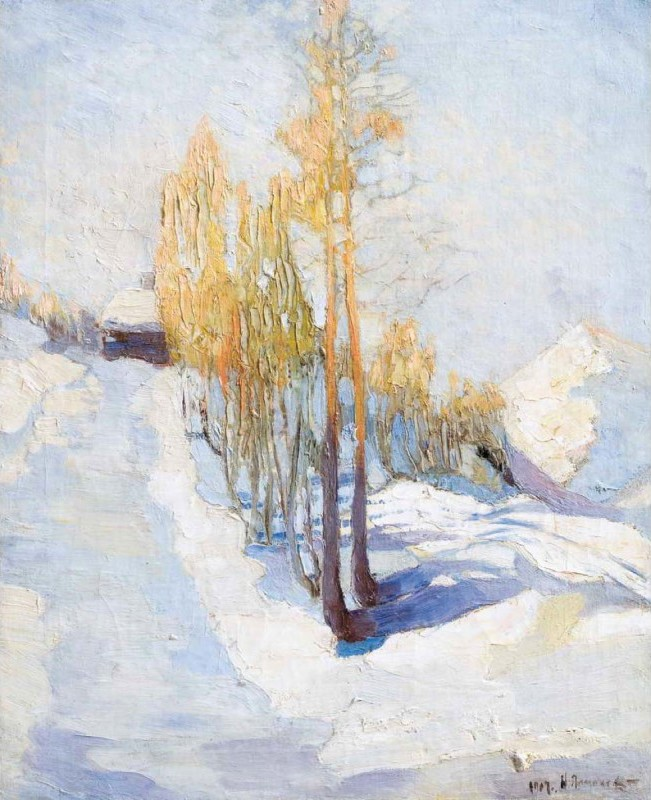
Winter Day,1907

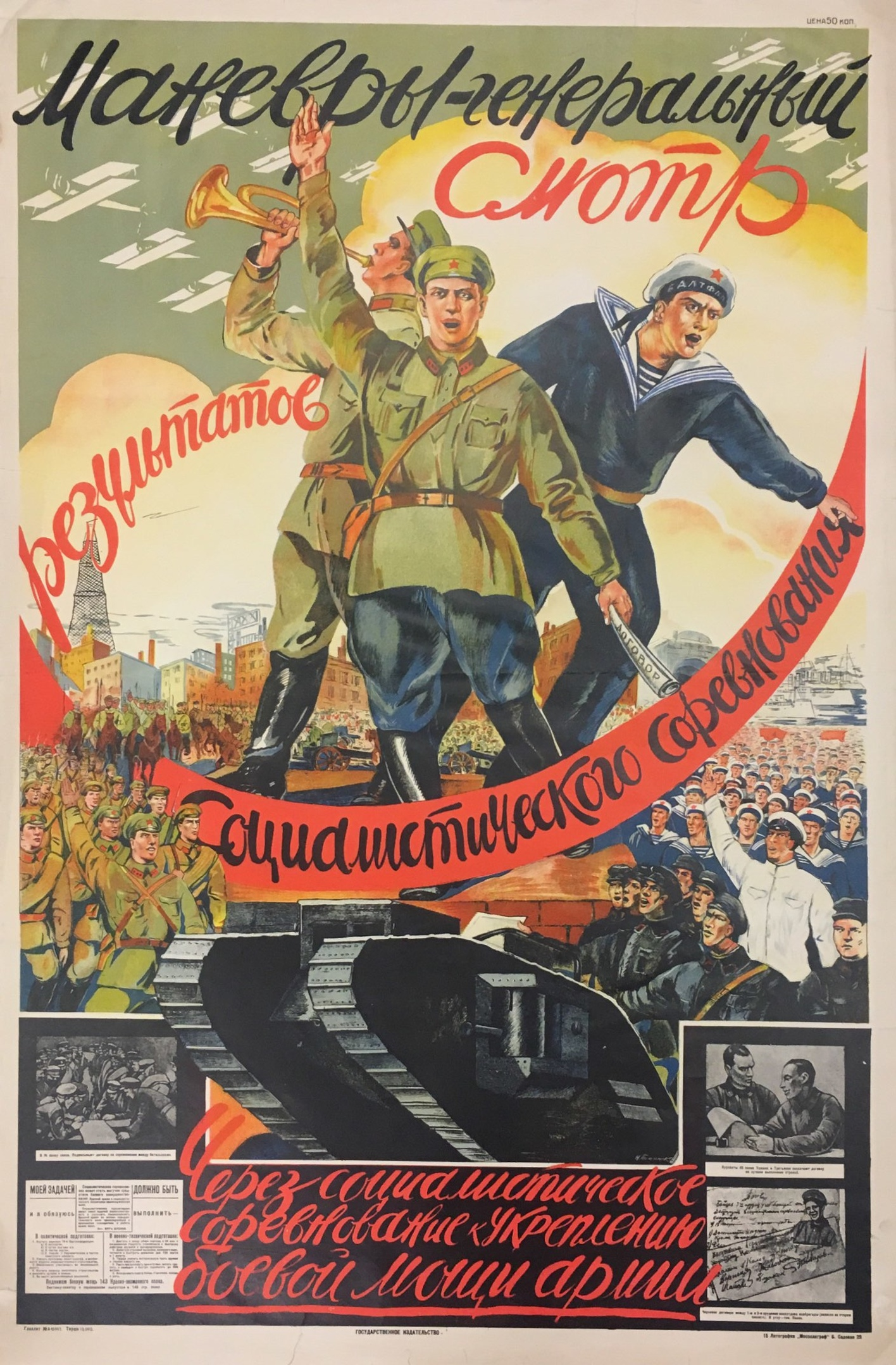
"Maneuvers are a general review of the results of socialist competition. Through socialist competition to strengthen the combat power of the army" (1920's)

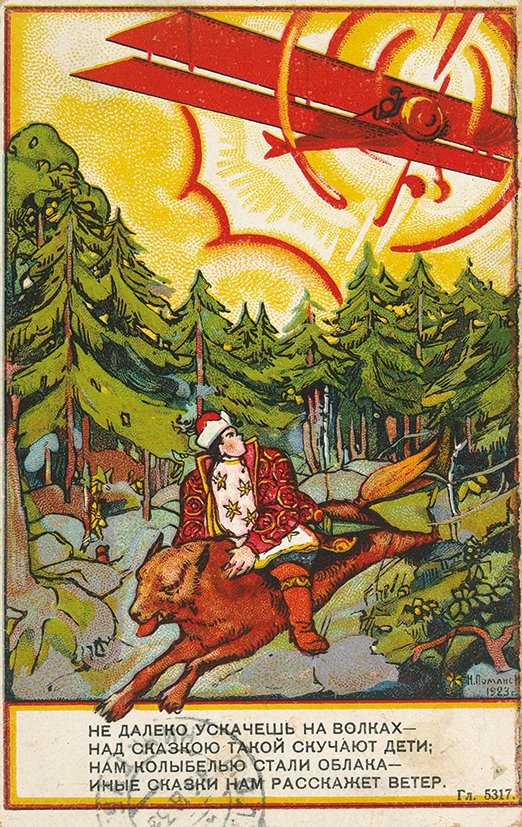
"Ivan Tsarevich and the Gray Wolf"
