= Apollinary Vasnetsov =

Russian painter (1856–1933)

- Аполлинарий Васнецов
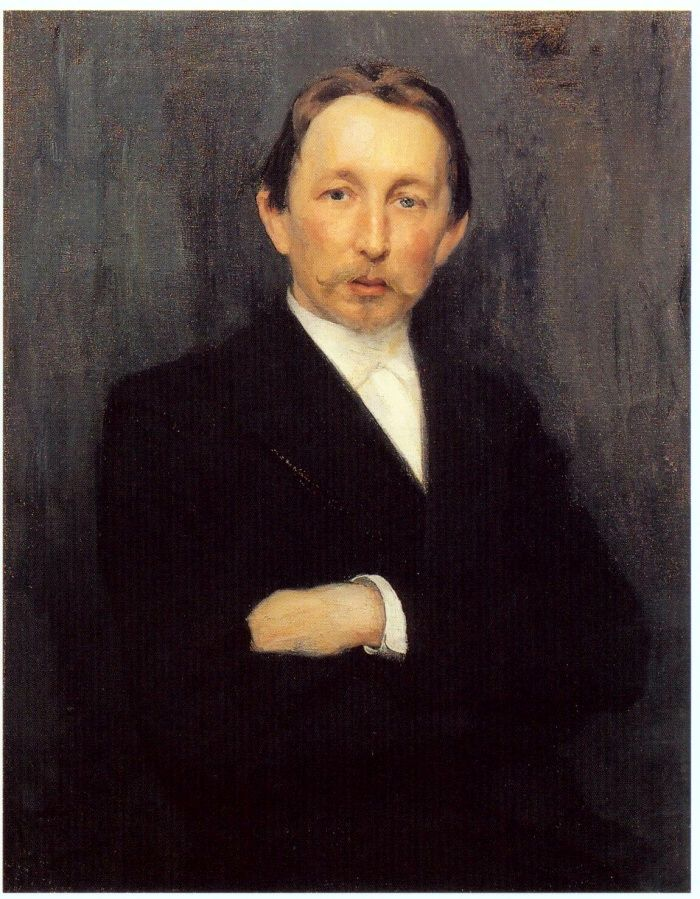
- Portrait by Nikolai D. Kuznetsov, 1897
- Born: 6 August [O.S. 25 July] 1856; Ryabovo, Vyatka Governorate, Russian Empire
- Died: 23 January 1933 (aged 76); Moscow, Russian SFSR, Soviet Union
- Education: Member Academy of Arts (1900)
- Alma mater: Moscow School of Painting
- Known for: Painting
- Movement: Peredvizhniki
- Relatives: Viktor (brother)

Apollinary Mikhaylovich Vasnetsov (Russian: Аполлина́рий Миха́йлович Васнецо́в; 6 August [O.S. 25 July] 1856 – 23 January 1933) was a Russian painter and graphic artist. He specialised in scenes from the medieval history of Moscow.

Vasnetsov did not receive a formal artistic education. He had studied under his older brother, Viktor, also a famous painter. From 1883, he along with his brother lived and worked in Abramtsevo where he fell under the influence of Vasily Polenov. In 1898–1899, he travelled across Europe. In addition to epic landscapes of Russian nature, Apollinary Vasnetsov created his own genre of historical landscape reconstruction on the basis of historical and archaeological data. His paintings present a visual picture of medieval Moscow. He was a member of the Association of Travelling Art Exhibitions (Peredvizhniki) from 1899, and an academician from 1900. He became one of the founders and supervisors of the Union of Russian Artists.

== Early life ==
Vasnetsov had three elder and two younger brothers. His only sister died at the age of four months. Vasnetsov's father played an important role in the upbringing and education of his sons, teaching them to love nature and to become familiar with the life of birds and animals. Vasnetsov's father died in 1870, which came as a terrible blow for him.

== The Caucasus and the Urals ==
In 1890, Vasnetsov made a journey across the North of the Russian Empire and was able to record beautiful views of Siberia and the Urals, including the paintings:

- Forest on the Slopes of Mount Blagodat, Mid-Urals (1890)
- Boreal forest in the Urals (1890)
- Mountain lake in the Urals (1892)
- The Steppes of Orenburg (1895)
- "Koma" (1895)

In 1895, Vasnetsov visited the Caucasus. He was deeply impressed by the beauty of the rugged Caucasus mountains. While there, he climbed the glaciers of Mt. Elbrus, visited Tiflis and lived in the Darial Gorge. He created a great number of his sketches during this period, including:

- View of Elbrus from Bermomut (1895)
- Red Cliffs in Kislovodsk (1896)
- Elbrus before Sunrise (1897)
- Darial (1897)

In 1890, Vasnetsov made a journey across Europe, visiting France and Italy, where he studied the works of famous masters.

At the beginning of 1920, the Committee of Archaeology (the predecessor of the Community for the Saving of Art Monuments) invited Vasnetsov and several other painters (including Vikentii Trofimov) to draw the old places of Voronezh.

A minor planet, 3586 Vasnetsov, discovered by Soviet astronomer Lyudmila Zhuravlyova in 1978, is named after Viktor Vasnetsov and Apollinary Vasnetsov.

== Gallery ==
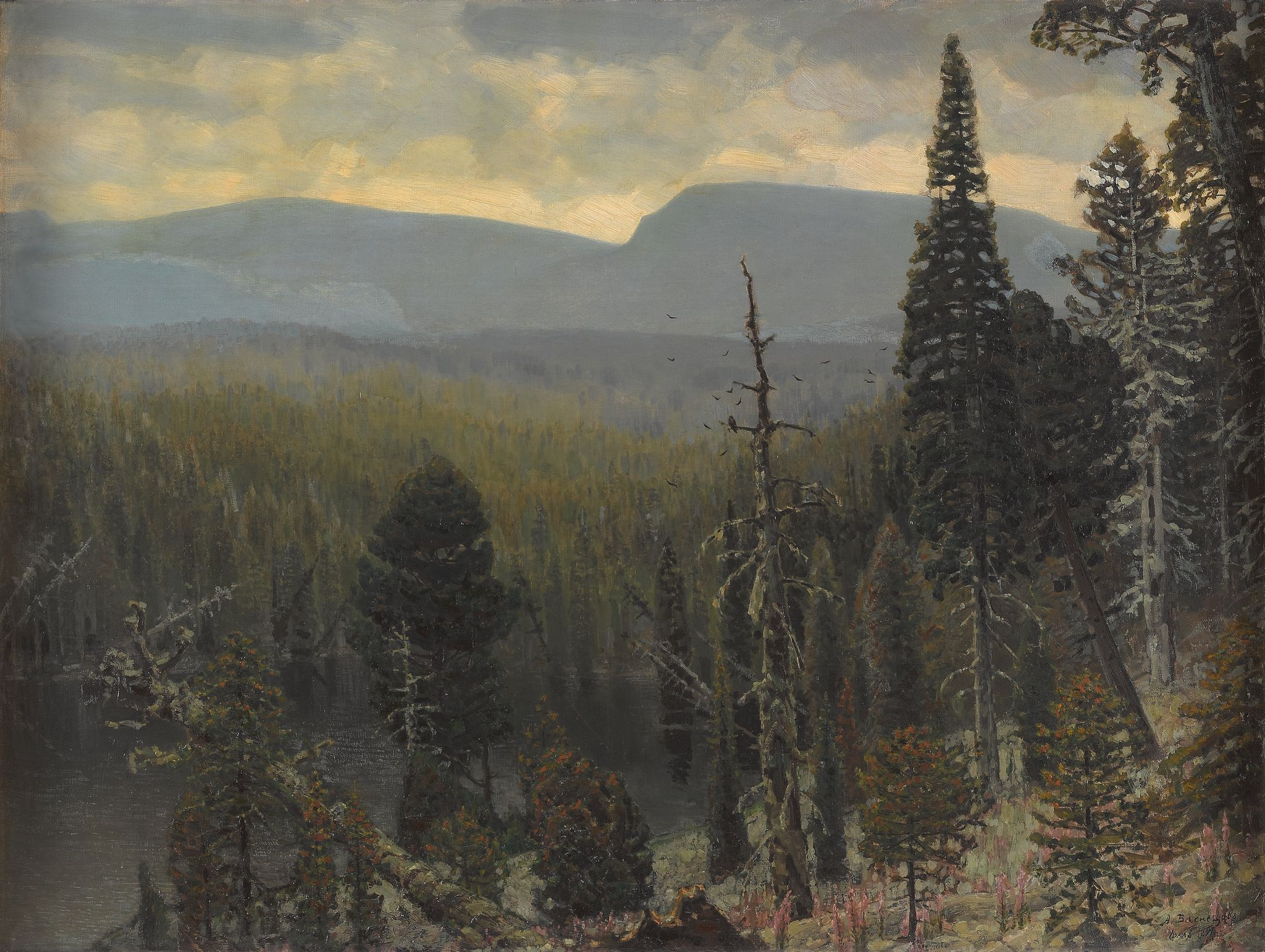
Boreal forest in the Ural mountains (1890)

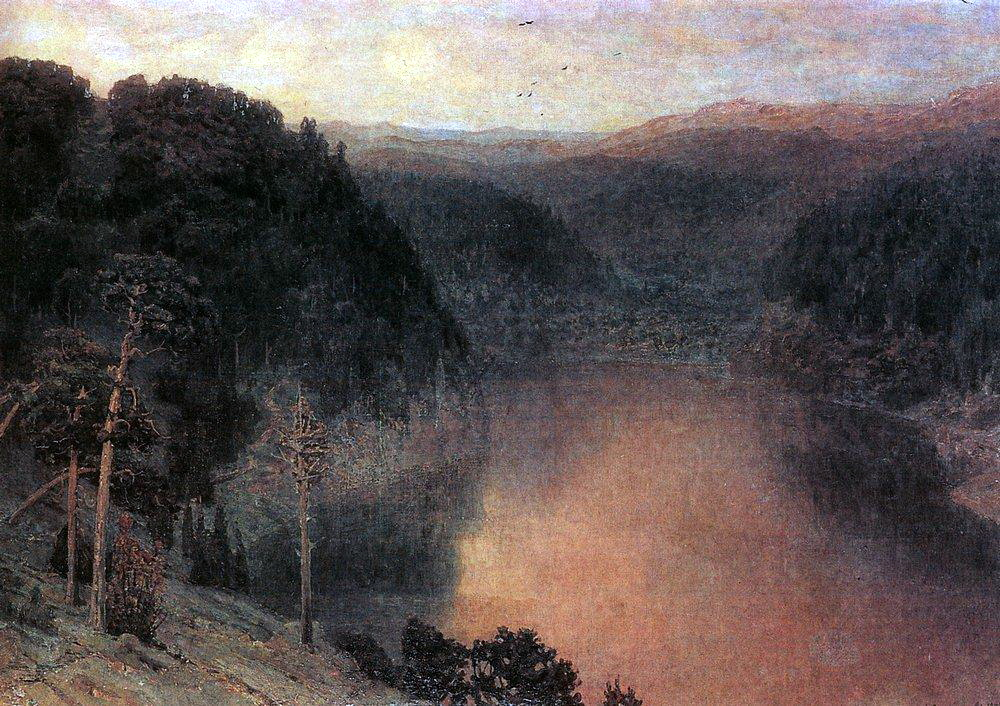
Mountain Lake (1892)

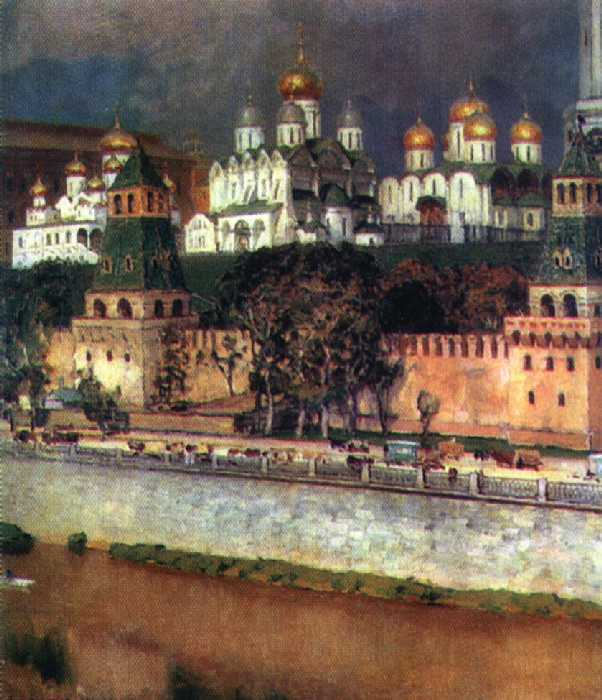
Kremlin (1892)

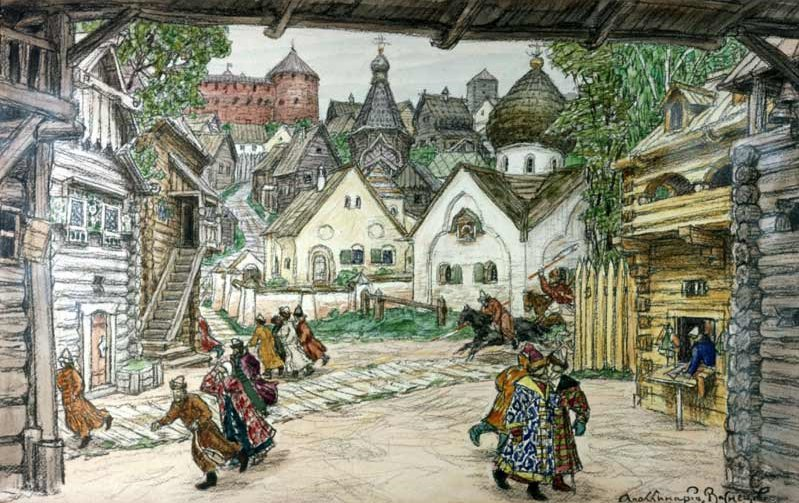
Set for the opera The Oprichnik by Tchaikovsky (1911)

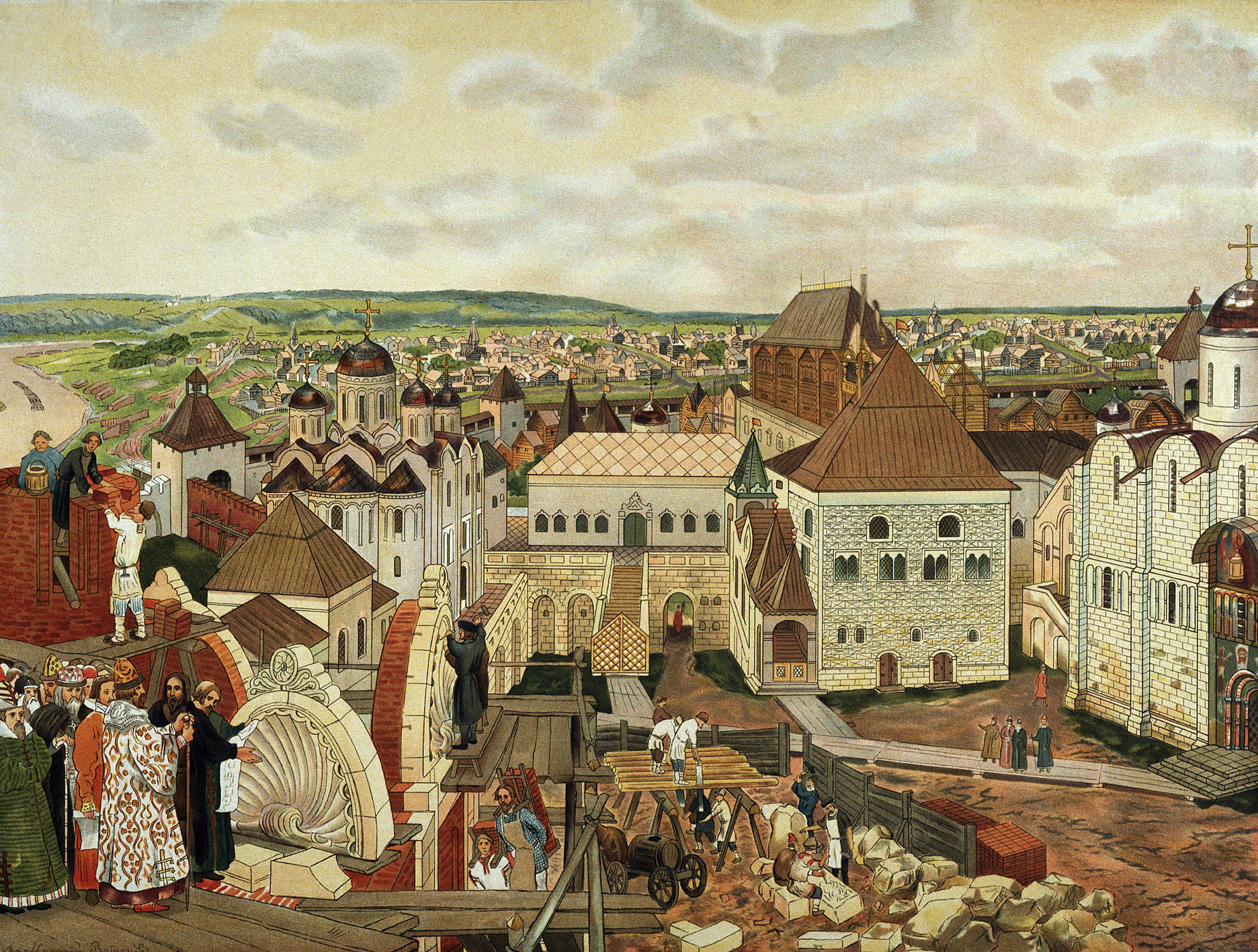
In the Moscow Kremlin

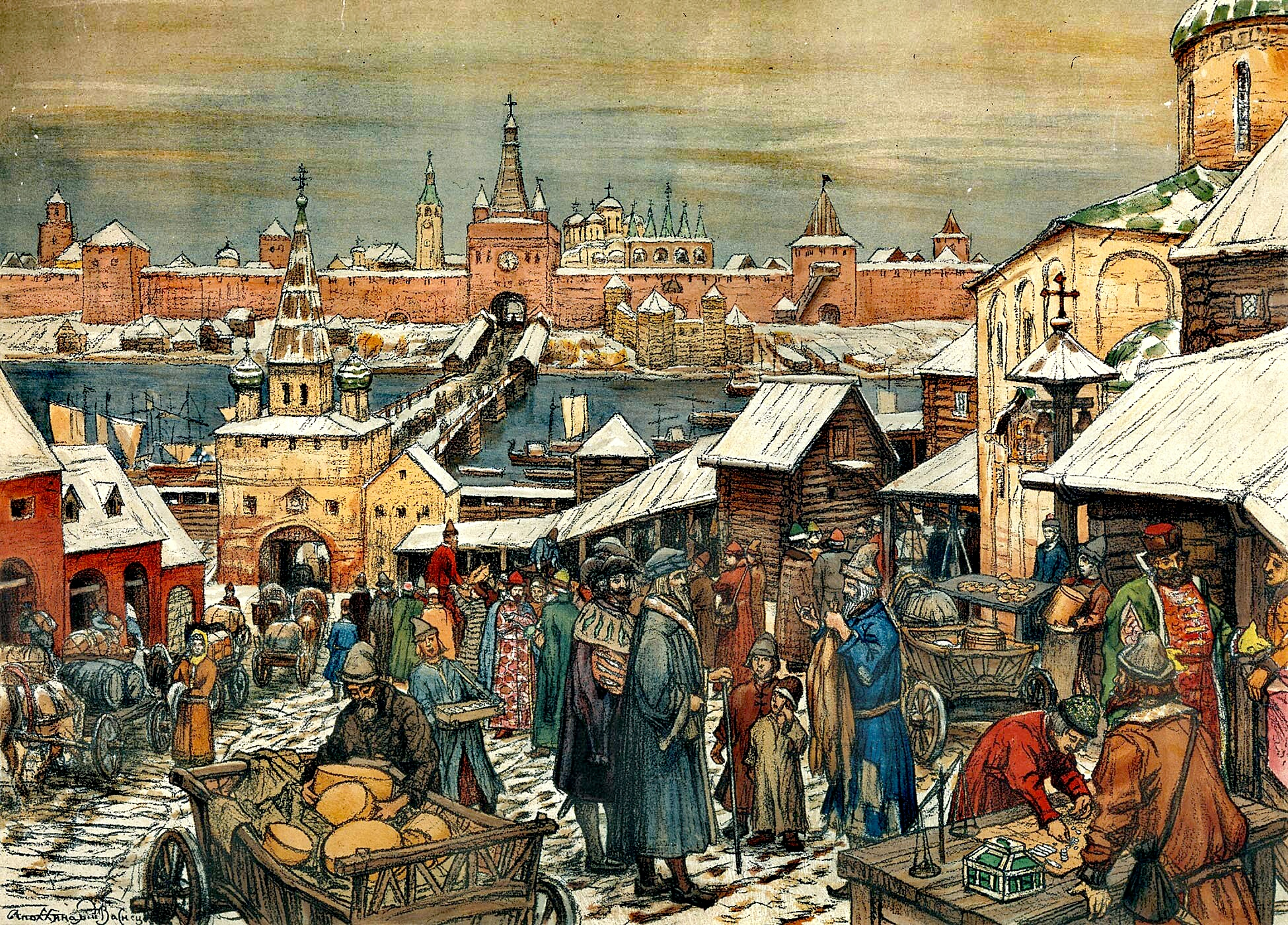
Novgorod marketplace

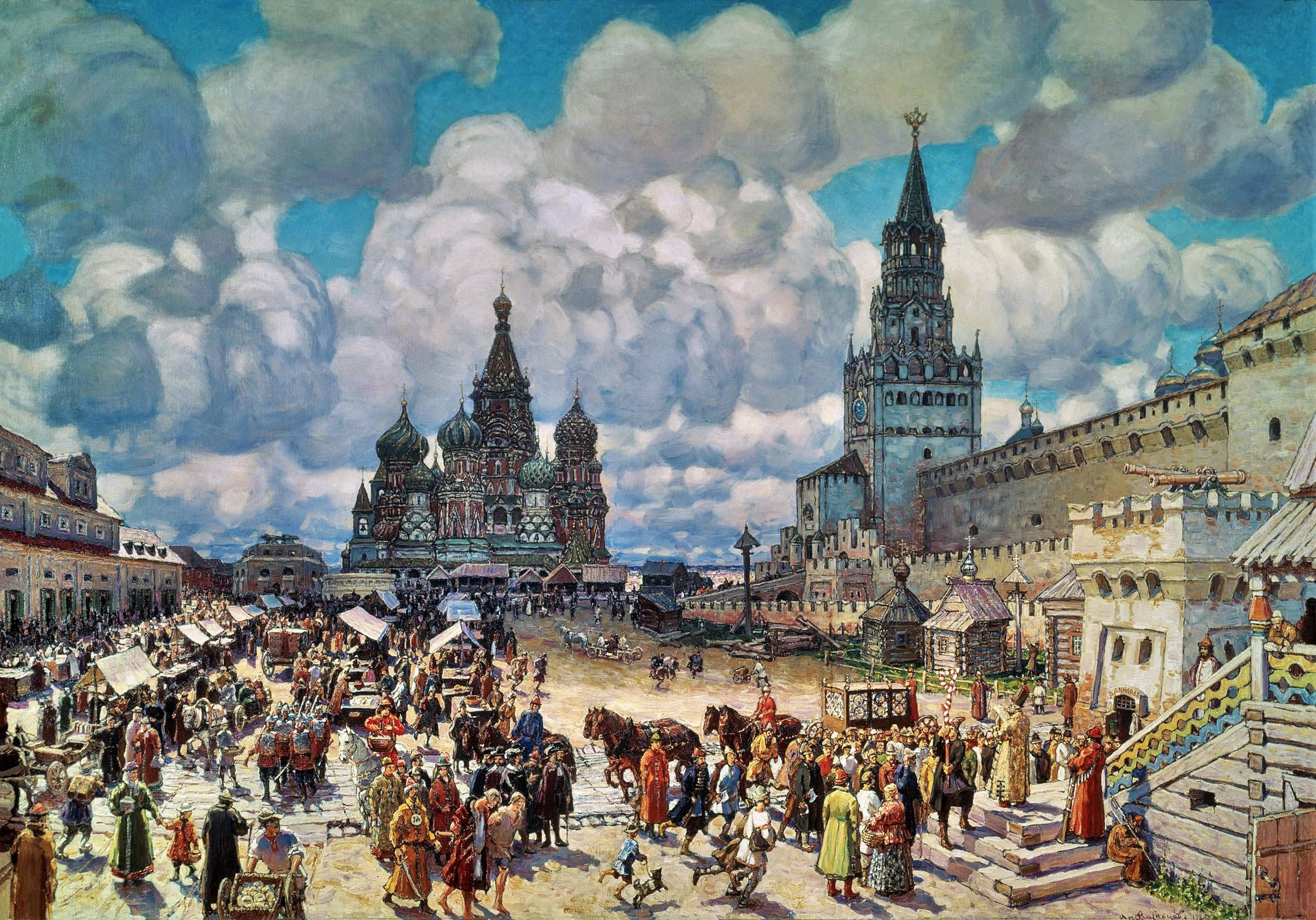
Red Square in the second half of the 17th century

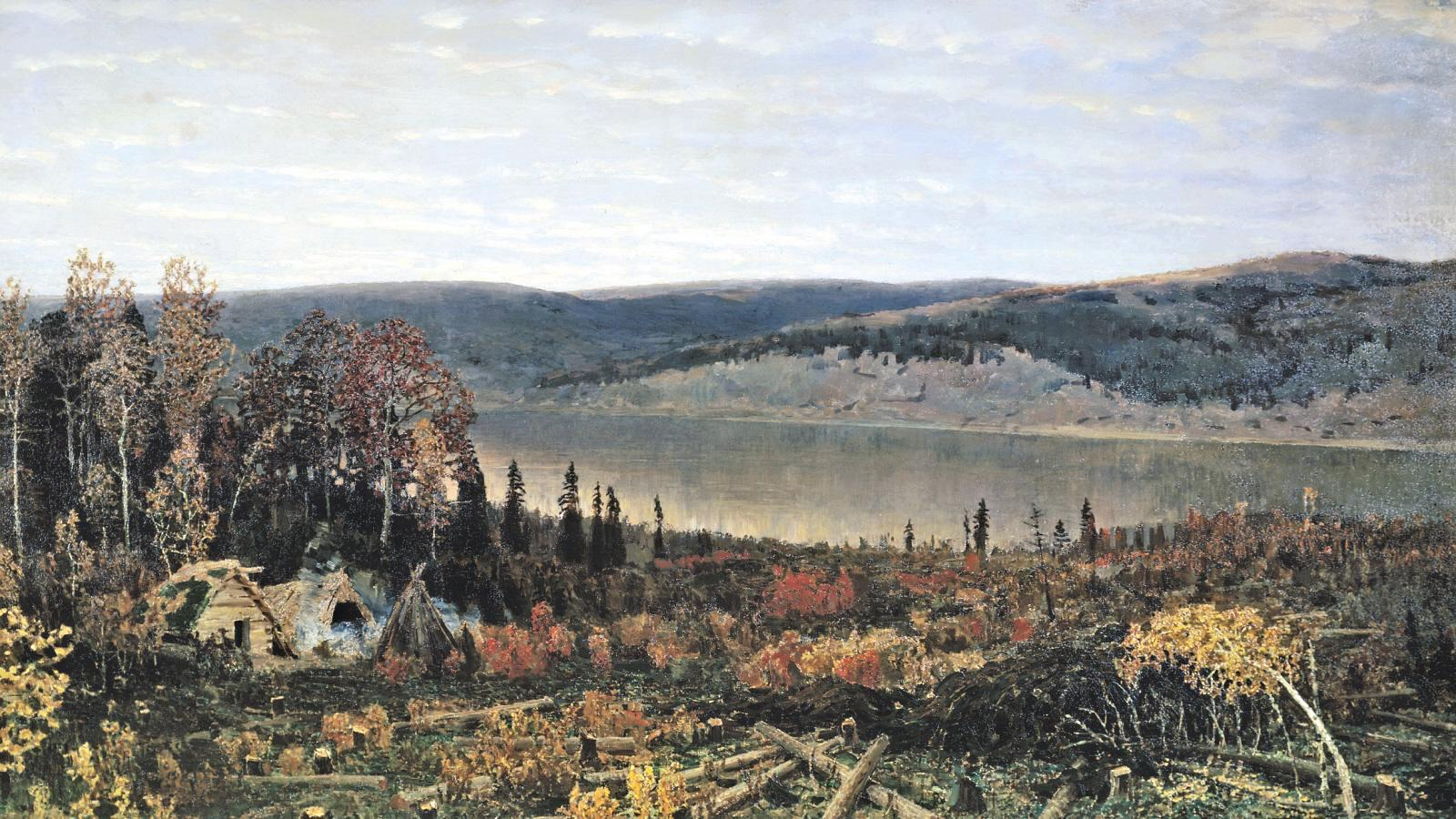
Kama River

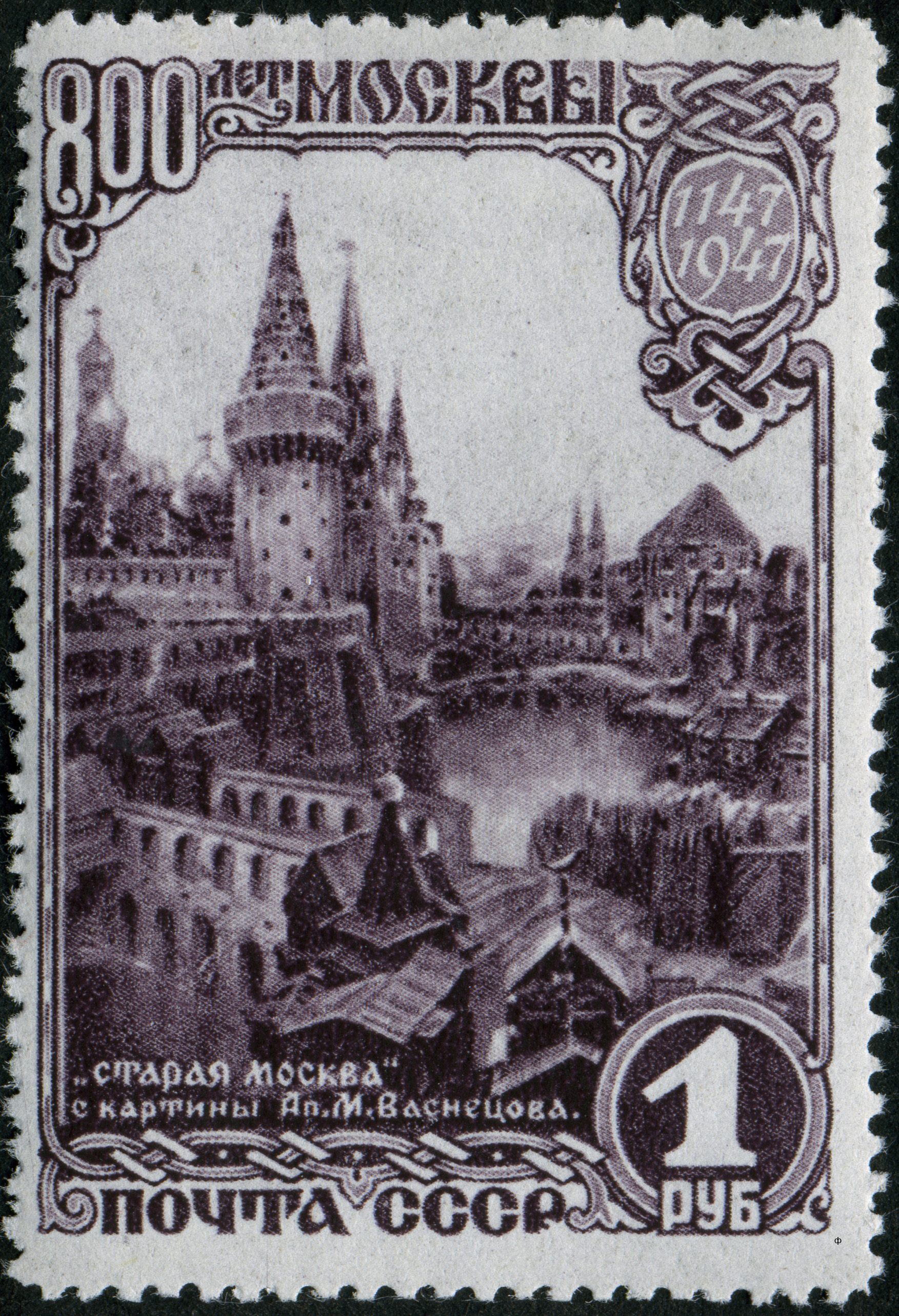
Painting of "Old Moscow" by Vasnetsov, depicted on a 1947 stamp

== See also ==
- List of Russian artists
