= Tania Antoshina =

Russian-born French artist (born 1956)

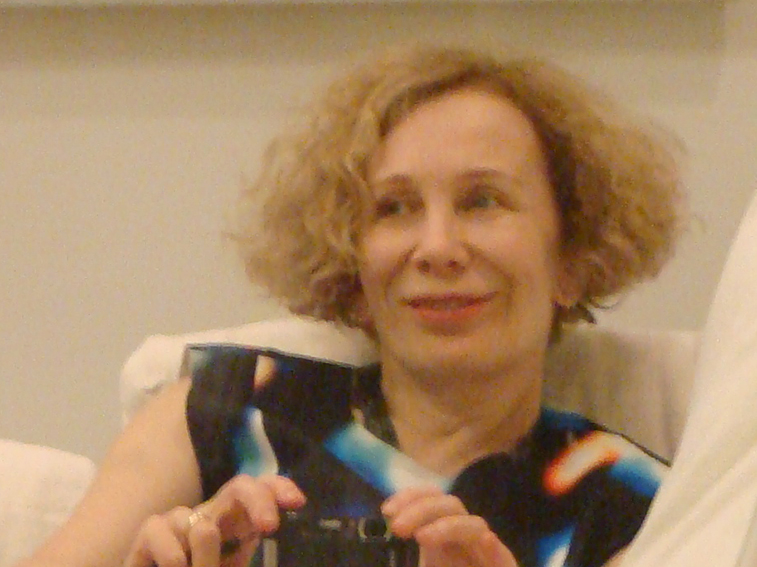
- Born: Татьяна Константиновна Антошина; 1 May 1956 (age 70); Krasnoyarsk, Siberia, Russian Soviet Federative Socialist Republic, Soviet Union
- Education: PhD Stroganov Moscow State University of Arts and Industry
- Known for: Feminist art, Contemporary art, Installation art, Visual artist, Sculpture, Ceramics, Photography, Video art
- Notable work: Museum of a Woman, My Favorite Artists, Europe, Space Travelers, Blue Cities, Space Ark, Cold Land
- Style: Installation art, conceptual art, feminist art
- Movement: Post-Soviet art, Eastern European feminist art
- Parents: Konstantin Fokich Antoshin (1924–1990) (father); Raisa Sergeevna Nosova (1928–2020) (mother)
- Website: antoshina.com

Tania Antoshina (Russian: Таня Антошина; born 1 May 1956, Krasnoyarsk, Soviet Union) is a Russian-born contemporary artist and curator based in Paris. Antoshina is known for her contributions to post-Soviet and Eastern European feminist art, as well as for her artistic projects dedicated to ecology, Russian Cosmism, and the utopian imagination. Working at the intersection of sculpture, ceramics, installation, photography, video, and interdisciplinary practices, the artist explores the relationship between personal memory and collective history, addressing questions of identity, cultural continuity, and the preservation of knowledge in the context of social and political transformations. Antoshina's work gained prominence through projects such as Museum of a Woman, My Favorite Artists, Europe, Space Travelers, Blue Cities, Space Ark, Cold Land. Her artistic practice is examined within the context of feminist discourse, post-socialist identity, and contemporary interpretations of 20th-century utopian projects. In 2015, Antoshina represented the Republic of Mauritius at the 56th Venice Biennale. Her works are held in public and private collections including the American University Museum, the National Museum of Women in the Arts, MUMOK, the State Russian Museum, the New Museum Weserburg Bremen, and others.

== Early life and education ==
Antoshina was born in Krasnoyarsk, Siberia, into an academic family. Her father, Konstantin Fokich Antoshin (1924–1990), was a literary scholar specializing in the literatures of Siberia and one of the first Doctors of Sciences in Khakassia. Her mother, Raisa Sergeevna Nosova (1928–2020), was a physicist, Candidate of Physical and Mathematical Sciences and university lecturer. The intellectual environment in which Antoshina grew up combined the humanities and the sciences and contributed to her lifelong interest in knowledge, memory, cultural transmission and the history of ideas. From 1974 to 1978, she attended at the Krasnoyarsk Art College. Between 1979 and 1983 she studied sculpture and ceramics at the Krasnoyarsk Institute of Arts. In 1987 she entered the Stroganov Moscow State University of Arts and Industry, where in 1991 she defended her dissertation on the topic "Primitive ceramics as an artistic and aesthetic phenomenon (based on materials from South Siberian antiquities)" and received a candidate of science degree, equivalent to a doctorate, in art history.

== Artistic practice ==
=== Moscow period ===
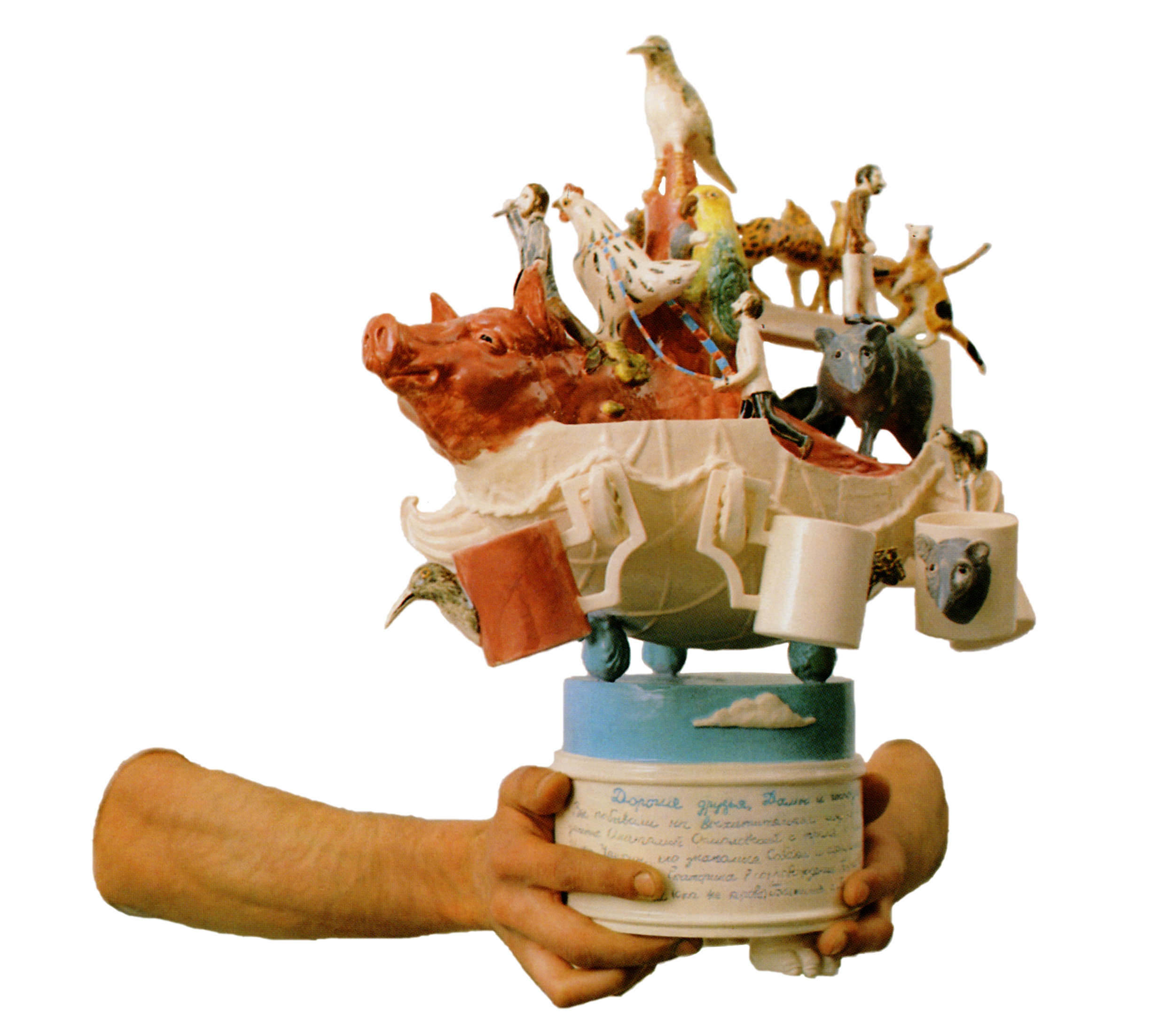
Tania Antoshina, ceramic sculpture Animal Festival, 1992

Antoshina emerged on the Moscow contemporary art scene during the late 1980s and early 1990s. Early projects were associated with conceptual and post-conceptual artistic circles and included collaborations with Yuri Leiderman and Andrei Monastyrski, other representatives of the post-Soviet artistic milieu. Some works from this period were exhibited under the names Tatiana Mashukova and Tatiana Mashukova-Antoshina.

=== Feminist art and Museum of a Woman ===
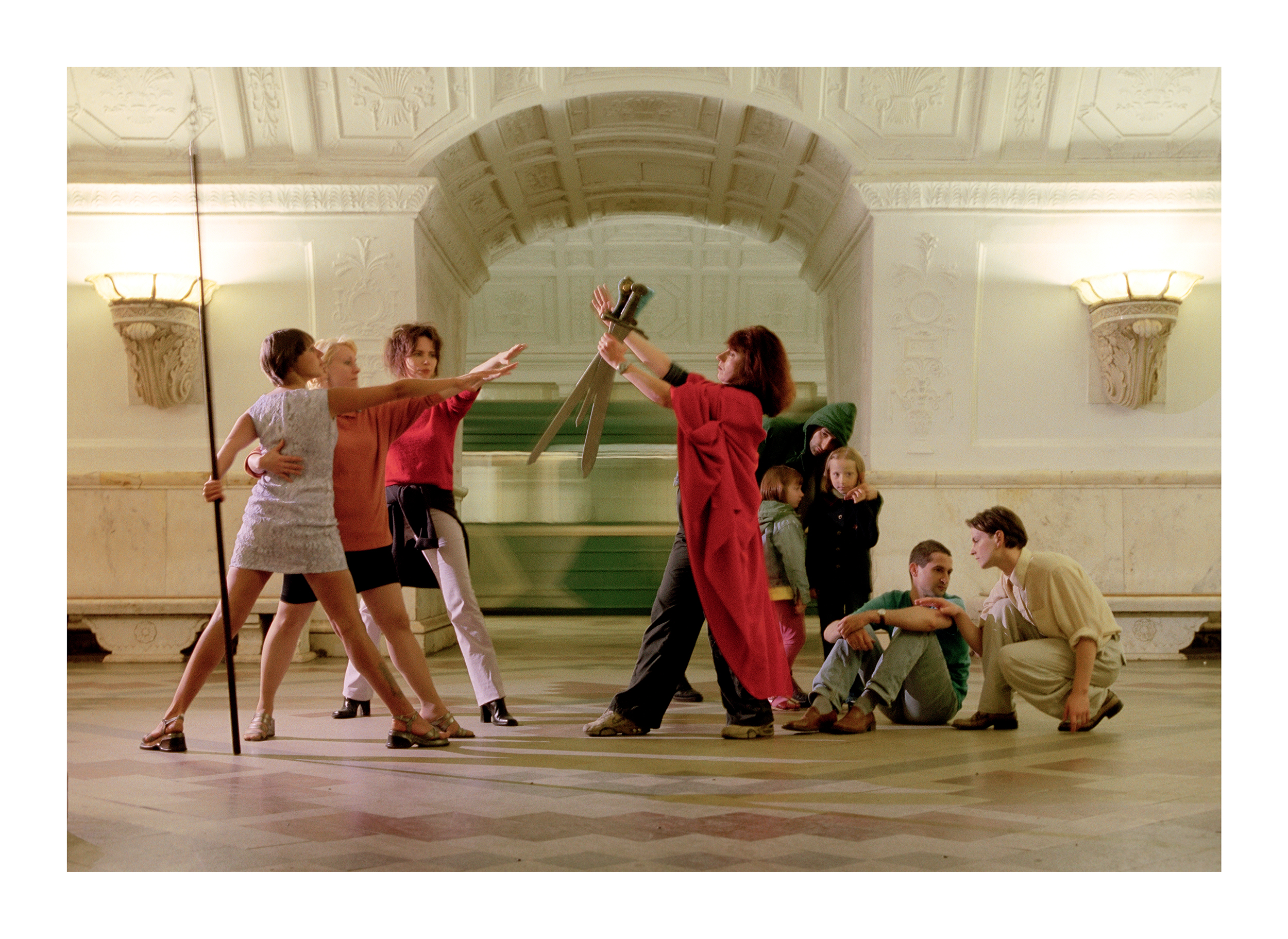
Tania Antoshina, stage photo The Oath, from series Museum of a Woman, 2000

One of the central directions of her work has been the reimagining of the role of women in the history of art and culture. The most prominent project of this period is Museum of a woman, in which the artist engages with masterpieces of European art, reversing traditional gender roles. This series of staged photographs reimagines canonical images from European art history through feminist inversion and gender critique. This project is widely regarded by researchers as a significant artistic interpretation of feminist discourse within post-Soviet art.

Brian Dillon wrote in Modern Painters (magazine) that Antoshina's meticulously staged photographs create a deliberate bodily ambiguity, blurring fixed distinctions between male and female representation.

=== Brener ===
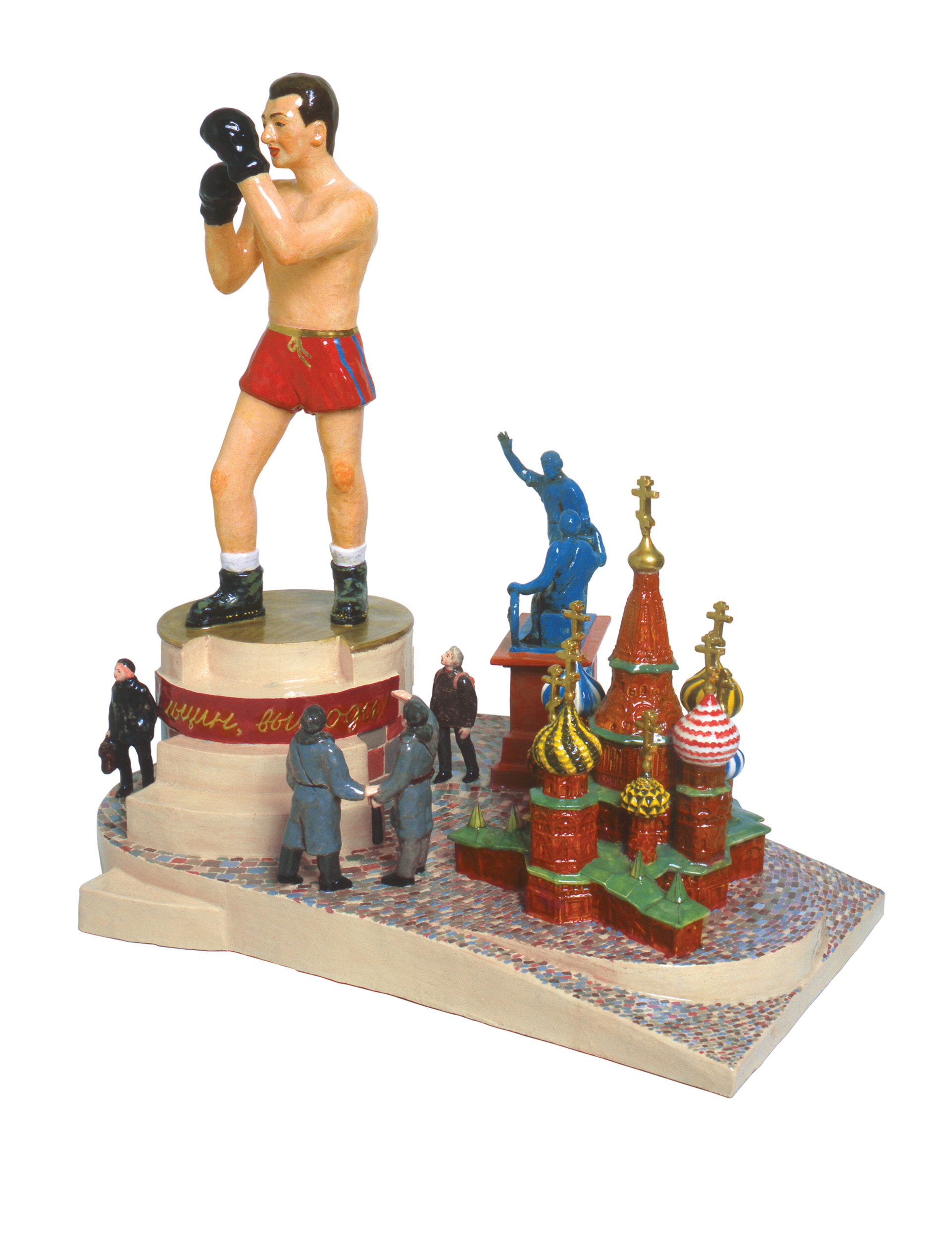
Tania Antoshina, ceramic sculpture Eltsyn, Come Out!, 2000

The main character of this sculptural series is a performing artist Alexander Brener.

Poet and Speaker as well as Chimeras, Come Here are three works belonging to a larger series in which Tatyana Antoshina realizes a turn unknown to history of art: she “translates” performance art into a porcelain statuary.

In this family of works Antoshina continues to elaborate her major preoccupation: the representation or rather the construction of the maleness in modern and contemporary art. Combining the traditionally "high" genre of performance with the historically "low" material of ceramics, she questions the role of the radical artist in the contemporary world, while simultaneously approaching her personages with empathy and subtle humor.

— Bojana Pejić, Kunstkatalog 8. Triennale Kleinplastik Fellbach 2001: Vor-Sicht Rück-Sicht

=== My Favorite Artists ===
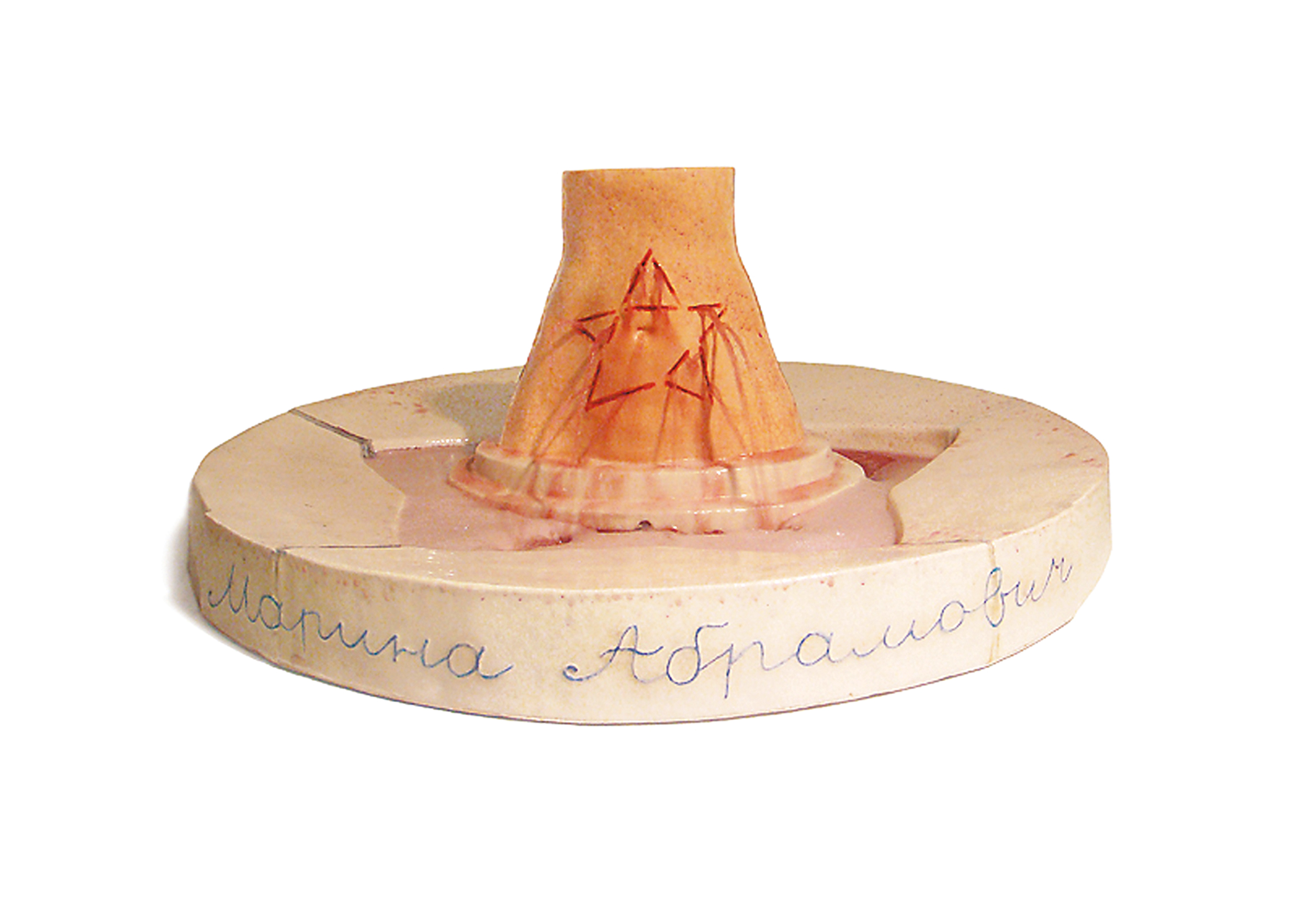
Tania Antoshina, red wine fountain The Star. Marina Abramovic, 2008

In the early 2000s, Antoshina released a series of ceramic sculptures, "My Favorite Artists," featuring performance artists. Antoshina achieves an unusual transformation of performance into ceramic sculpture, preserving ephemeral artistic actions in a durable medium.

Antoshina resolved, as was demanded by the small scale, the basic problem a sculptor (or photographer) is confronted with: to “catch” a movement of the human body and “freeze” it for posterity. This is the “pregnant moment” which both Lessing and Cartier-Bresson found for sculpture and photography, respectively.

=== Cosmism and utopian imagination ===
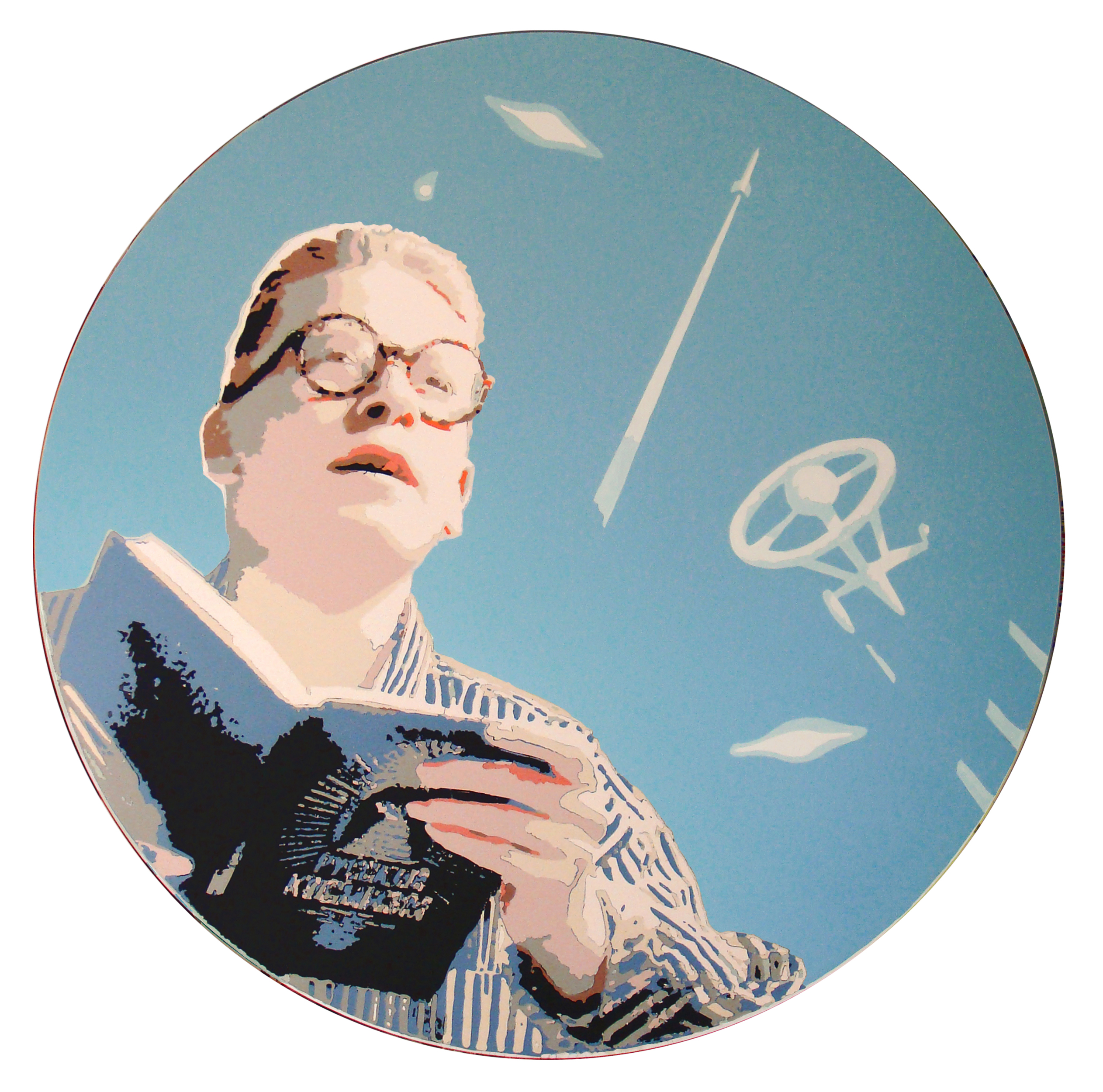
Tania Antoshina, Picture N6 from the project Space Travellers, 2006

Themes of flight, cosmism and utopian imagination have occupied a central place in Antoshina's work since the mid-1980s. Projects such as Space Travelers, Europe, Blue Cities, Telepathy and Space Ark explore the legacy of Russian cosmism, Soviet visions of the future and broader questions concerning humanity's place in the universe.

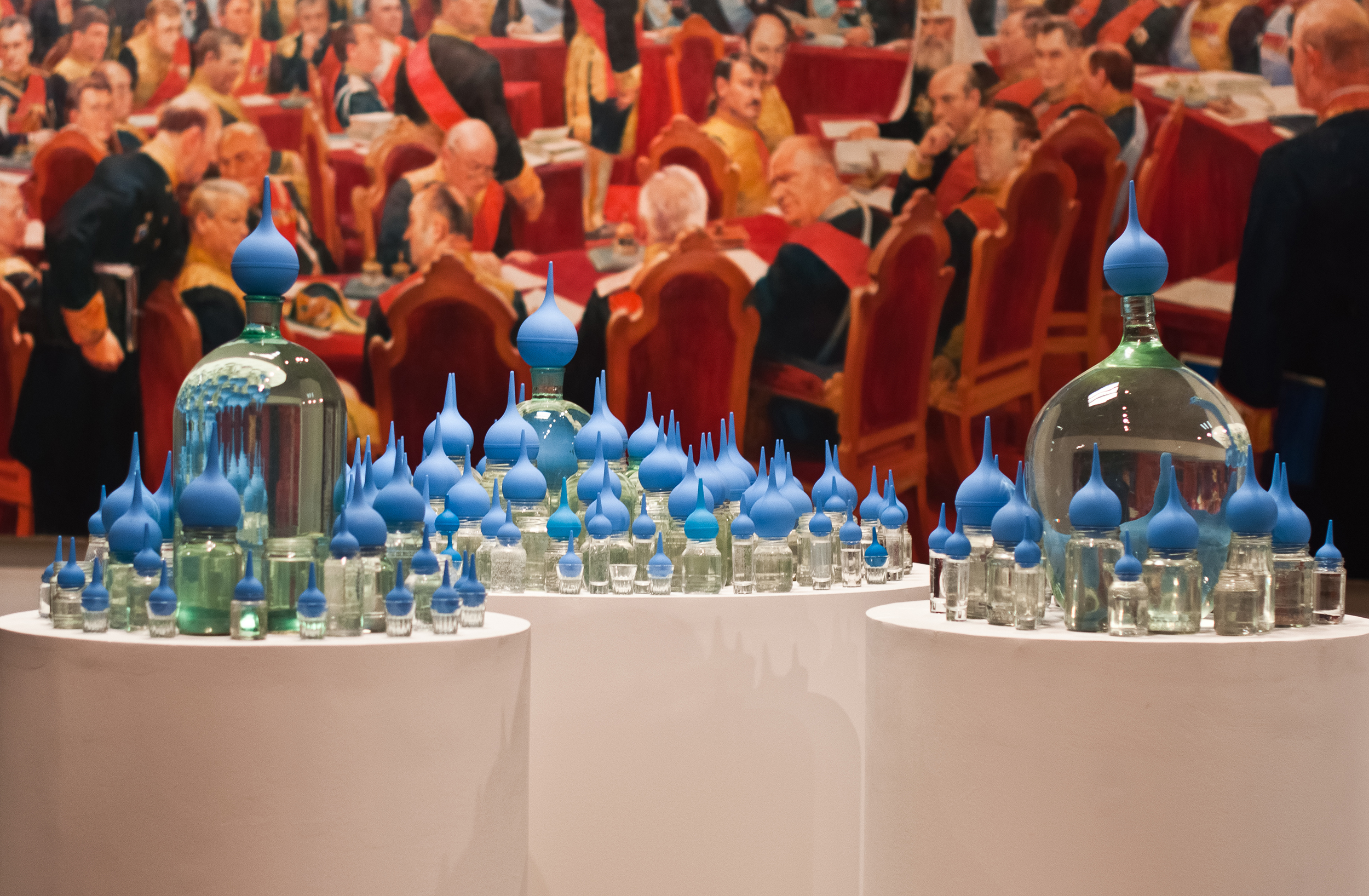
Tania Antoshina, installation Blue Cities, 2011

Curator and art historian Vitaly Patsyukov interpreted Antoshina's installation Space Travelers as a contemporary artistic continuation of cosmist thought, emphasizing flight, weightlessness and intellectual freedom.

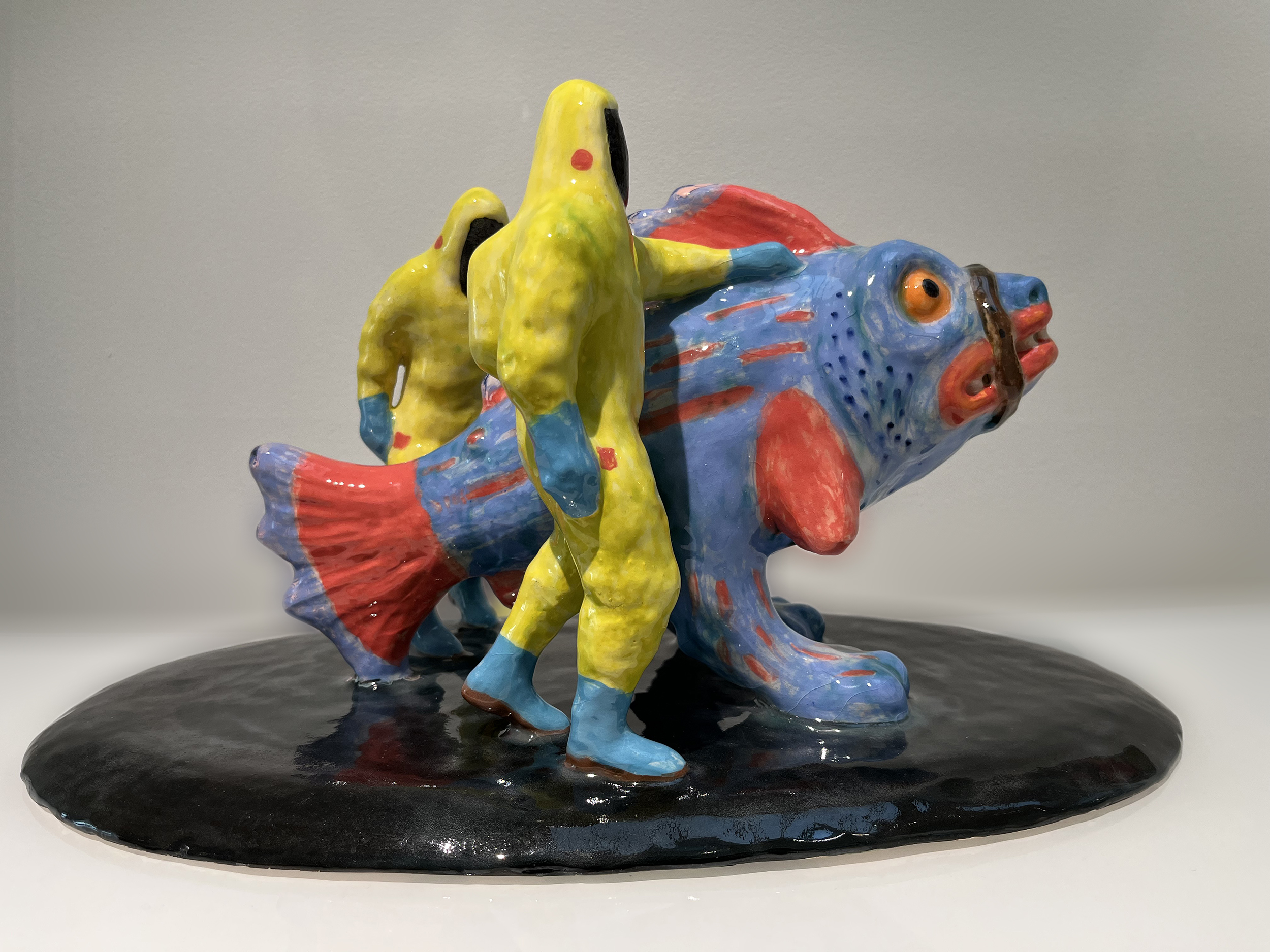
Tania Antoshina, ceramic sculpture Fish-Beast, from series Bestiary, from project Space Ark, 2018

Writing about the exhibition Space Ark, art critic Alexey Tarkhanov described Antoshina's artistic practice as a synthesis of mythology, memory and cosmic imagination, in which individual experience becomes part of a larger cultural narrative.

=== Memory, exile and Cold Land ===
Since the 2010s memory, exile and cultural transmission have become central concerns of Antoshina's work. Her long-term project Cold Land (Russian: Холодная Земля; French: À la lumière des ténèbres) examines Siberia as both a geographical and metaphysical territory. Combining autobiography, historical research and installation, the project focuses on scientists, intellectuals, artists and European exiles whose lives became intertwined with Siberian history.

In the installations "Mathematics Teacher," "Couturier," "Maestro Quesnel," «Fete» and "Road," as well as in the objects "Suitcase," "Permafrost," and the fountain "Voltaire" real events, archetypal images, myths, and utopia are intertwined.

== Critical reception ==
Antoshina's work has been discussed by art historians, critics and curators in relation to feminist art, post-Soviet cultural identity, cosmism, memory studies and contemporary interpretations of exile.

== Public collections ==
Works by Antoshina are held in public and private collections including:

- Museum Moderner Kunst Stiftung Ludwig Wien (MUMOK), Vienna;
- National Museum of Women in the Arts, Washington, D.C.;
- American University Museum at the Katzen Arts Center, Washington;
- Mint Museum, Charlotte;
- Kolodzei Art Foundation, New York;
- Neues Museum Weserburg Bremen;
- Casoria Contemporary Art Museum, Naples;
- Changzhou Museum, Changzhou;
- Penang State Museum and Art Gallery, Penang;
- New Tretyakov Gallery, Moscow;
- State Russian Museum, Saint Petersburg;
- State Hermitage Museum Research Library, Saint Petersburg;
- All-Russian Museum of Decorative and Applied Arts, Moscow;
- Perm Museum of Modern Art, Perm;
- Zarya Center for Contemporary Art, Vladivostok;
- ROSIZO State Museum and Exhibition Centre, Moscow;
- Krasnoyarsk Cultural Historical Museum Complex, Krasnoyarsk;
- Kolodzei Art Foundation, New York;
- Francis J. Greenburger Collection, New York;
- Asia-Pacific Institute of Art & Research, Jeollabuk-do, South Korea;
- Marat Gelman Gallery, Dukley, Budva;
- Hans Pusch Collection, Vienna;
- Tony Podesta Collection, Washington, D.C.;
- Robert Vallois Collection, Paris;
- Sir Elton John Collection;
- Ed Sheeran Collection.

== Selected exhibitions ==
Selected solo and group exhibitions include:

- À la lumière des ténèbres. Les Français en exil. Cold Land, Galerie Vallois, Paris, 2026;
- 26 International Biennale of Vallauris – Contemporary Creation and Ceramics, Musée Magnelli, Musée de la céramique, Vallauris, France;
- Sky is my land, L-Galerie, Paris, 2023;
- Space Ark, Galerie Vallois, Paris, 2023;
- Moves Like Walter: New Curators Open the Corcoran Legacy Collection, American University Museum, Washington, D.C., 2019;
- ART RIOT: Post-Soviet Actionism, Saatchi Gallery, London, 2017;
- This Leads to Fire: From Nonconformism to Global Capitalism, Neuberger Museum of Art, New York, 2014–2015;
- 56th Venice Biennale, Mauritius Pavilion, Venice, 2015;
- ŽEN d’ART Gender History of Art in the Post-Soviet Space: 1989–2009 Moscow Museum of Modern Art, Petrovka 25, Moscow, 2010;
- Gender Check: Femininity and Masculinity in the Art of Eastern Europe, MUMOK, Vienna, 2009–2010;
- After the Wall, Moderna Museet, Stockholm; Ludwig Museum, Budapest; Hamburger Bahnhof, Berlin, 1999–2001;
- The Hound of Baskerville (with Yuri Leiderman), Regina Gallery, Moscow, 1992.

== Curator’s projects ==
- DIALOGUES together with Maaike Leyn, Studio Albatros, Montreuil, Paris, 2025;
- OUI, FONTAINE! Studio Albatros, Montreuil, Paris, 2024;
- THE QUEST OF THE POWER Exhibition is a participant of 6th Moscow Biennale of Contemporary Art Special program A3 Gallery, Moscow, 2015;
- TERRA INCOGNITA Expedition to South Siberia for collection of ethnic and cultural material Khakassia - Tyva - Khakassia, 2014;
- Kosmos as Presence - V5 Russian-German Art-Convention_together with A. Galenz and G. Kuznetsov InteriorDAsein, Berlin, 2012;
- SONS OF THE GREAT BEAR together with G. Kuznetsov, Art Festival dedicated to the 50th anniversary of the first manned mission into space, PROEKT_FABRIКА art center, Hall Gruntovalnoy Machiny, Moscow, 2011;
- 3 EUROPEAN TRIENNIAL OF SMALL SCULPTURES together with Katia Baudin-Reneau (Strasbourg),Prof. Bruno Corá (Florence/La Spezia), Prof. Dr. Thomas Deecke (Berlin), Dr. Andreas Hapkemeyer (Bozen), Dr. Ulrich Loock / Ricardo Nicolau (Porto), Mag. Franc Obal (Murska Sobota), David Thorp (London), Dr. Margit Zuckriegl (Salzburg), Galerija Murska Sobota, Murska Sobota, Slovenia, 2008;
- TWO MUSEUM together with G. Vysheslavsky, Ciampino, Velletri, Italy, 1993.

== Honors and awards ==
- 2012 Winner of the London Olympic gold medal for the Olympic Fine Arts;
- 2012 Russian Activist Art alternative award at the Media Strike Assembly, Moscow;
- 2008 Winner of the Beijing Olympic gold medal and Torch for the Olympic Fine Arts;
- 2008 Five Rings Prize, Landscape Sculpture Design Contest, Beijing;
- 2006 Magmart (prizewinner), Naples;
- 2003 Silver Camera (prizewinner), Moscow House of Photography (MMAM), Moscow;
- 2002 Silver Camera (prizewinner), Moscow House of Photography (MMAM), Moscow;
- 2001 Art Photo, Modern Russia photography contest (prizewinner), Moscow;
- 1989 Best report award, theoretical conference of post-graduates and teachers of the Stroganov Moscow State University (Academy) of Arts and Industry (Stroganovka), Moscow;
- 1985 Silver medal at V.D.N.H. (Exhibition of People’s Achievements in Economy) of the USSR, Culture pavilion, Moscow;
- 1984 Best Teacher award, Art Academy, Krasnoyarsk.

== Publications and scholarship ==
Antoshina's work has been discussed in exhibition catalogues, academic publications, museum projects and studies devoted to feminist art, post-Soviet culture, memory and contemporary Eastern European art. Selected publications and scholarly references include:

- Pejić, Bojana, ed. (2009). Gender Check: Femininity and Masculinity in the Art of Eastern Europe. MUMOK / ERSTE Stiftung.;
- "Feminist Art Anthologies". KT Press.;
- Frimmel, Sandra (2022). Art Judgements: Art on Trial in Russia after Perestroika. Vernon Press.;
- "Tania Antoshina catalogue". Garage Museum of Contemporary Art Library.;
- Köhler, Astrid, ed. (2018). Déjà-vu-Effekte. Transcript Verlag.;
- Baigell, Renee; Baigell, Matthew, eds. (2001). Peeling Potatoes, Painting Pictures: Women Artists in Post-Soviet Russia, Estonia, and Latvia: The First Decade. Rutgers University Press.;
- Tarkhanov, Alexey (13 April 2023). "Antoshina and Raiders of the Lost Ark". Art Focus Now..

== Notes on names and transliteration ==
Antoshina has been identified in publications and exhibition catalogues under several name variants, including Tania Antoshina, Tatiana Antoshina, Tatyana Antoshina, Tanya Antoshina, Tatjana Antošina, Tatjana Antoschina, Tatiana Konstantinovna Antoshina, Tatiana Mashukova and Tatiana Mashukova-Antoshina. Since the 2000s she has primarily used the professional name Tania Antoshina in international exhibitions, publications and institutional contexts.
