= 1991 in the Soviet Union and Russia =

- Decades: 1970s; 1980s; 1990s
- See also: History of the Soviet Union; List of years in the Soviet Union

- Decades: 1970s; 1980s; 1990s; 2000s; 2010s
- See also: History of Russia; Timeline of Russian history; List of years in Russia

The following lists events that happened during 1991 in the Soviet Union and Russia.

The Soviet Union had a transitional government in 1991, during the fall of communism. Every republic in the union had growing nationalism until Christmas of 1991 when Mikhail Gorbachev, the General Secretary of the Communist Party of the Soviet Union and President of the Soviet Union, abandoned the Union at the time of its dissolution. The dissolution created huge changes in politics and territorial claims. NATO scaled back its presence following the dissolution.

== Incumbents ==
=== Soviet Union ===
- President of the Soviet Union — Mikhail Gorbachev (until 25 December)
- General Secretary of the Communist Party of the Soviet Union — Mikhail Gorbachev (until 24 August), Vladimir Ivashko (24–29 August)
- Chairman of the Supreme Soviet — Mikhail Gorbachev
- Vice President of the Soviet Union — Gennady Yanayev (until 4 September)
- Premier of the Soviet Union —
  - until 14 January – Nikolai Ryzhkov
  - 14 January - 22 August — Valentin Pavlov
  - 22 August - 6 September — vacant
  - 6 September - 26 December — Ivan Silayev

=== Russia ===
- Chairman of the Supreme Soviet of Russia as head of state — Boris Yeltsin (until 10 July)
- President of Russia — Boris Yeltsin (from 10 July)
- Vice President of Russia — Alexander Rutskoy (Patriots of Russia) (from 10 July)
- Prime Minister of Russia — Ivan Silayev (until 26 September), Oleg Lobov (26 September – 6 November, de facto acting Prime Minister), Boris Yeltsin (President as extraordinary head of cabinet from 6 November)

==== Governors ====
- Amur Oblast: Albert Krivchenko (starting October 8)
- Arkhangelsk Oblast: Pavel Balakshin (starting September 19)
- Astrakhan Oblast: Anatoly Guzhvin (starting August 28)
- Belgorod Oblast: Viktor Berestovoy (starting November 30)
- Bryansk Oblast: Vladimir Barabanov (starting December 14)
- Chelyabinsk Oblast: Vadim Solovyov (starting October 24)
- Irkutsk Oblast: Yury Nozhikov (starting September 19)
- Ivanovo Oblast: Adolf Laptev (starting December 24)
- Kaliningrad Oblast: Yury Matochkin (starting September 25)
- Kaluga Oblast: Aleksandr Deryagin (starting September 25)
- Kemerovo Oblast: Mikhail Kislyuk (starting August 27)
- Kirov Oblast: Vasily Desyatnikov (starting December 11)
- Kostroma Oblast: Valery Arbuzov (starting December 14)
- Kurgan Oblast: Valentin Gerasimov (starting October 24)
- Kursk Oblast: Vasily Shuteyev (starting December 11)
- Leningrad Oblast: Alexander Belyakov (starting October 20)
- Lipetsk Oblast: Gennady Kuptsov (starting October 23)
- Magadan Oblast: Viktor Mikhailov (starting November 15)
- Moscow Oblast: Anatoly Tyazhlov (starting October 16)
- Murmansk Oblast: Yevgeny Komarov (starting November 10)
- Nizhny Novgorod Oblast: Boris Nemtsov (starting November 30)
- Novogorod Oblast: Mikhail Prusak (starting October 24)
- Novosibirsk Oblast: Vitaly Mukha (starting November 26)
- Omsk Oblast: Leonid Polezhayev (starting November 11)
- Orenburg Oblast: Vladimir Elagin (starting October 24)
- Oryol Oblast: Nikolai Yudin (starting December 5)
- Penza Oblast: Aleksandr Kondratyev (starting October 24)
- Pskov Oblast: Anatoly Dobryakov (starting October 24)
- Rostov Oblast: Vladimir Chub (starting October 8)
- Ryazan Oblast: Lev Bashmakov (starting September 25)
- Sakhalin Oblast: Valentin Fyodorov (starting October 8)
- Samara Oblast: Konstantin Titov (starting August 31)
- Saratov Oblast: Yury Belykh (starting November 30)
- Smolensk Oblast: Valery Fateyev (starting October 24)
- Tambov Oblast: Vladimir Babenko (starting December 11)
- Tomsk Oblast: Viktor Kress (starting October 20)
- Tula Oblast: Nikolai Sevryugin (starting October 20)
- Tver Oblast: Vladimir Suslov (starting October 20)
- Tyumen Oblast: Yuri Shafranik (starting September 27)
- Ulyanovsk Oblast: Yuri Goryachev (starting October 24)
- Vladimir Oblast: Yury Vlasov (starting September 25)
- Volgograd Oblast: Ivan Shabunin (starting September 19)
- Vologda Oblast: Nikolai Podgornov (starting October 24)
- Voronezh Oblast: Viktor Kalasnikov (starting October 16)
- Yaroslavl Oblast: Anatoly Lisitsyn (Acting, starting December 3)
- Jewish Autonomous Oblast: Nikolay Volkov (starting December 14)

== Events ==
=== January ===
January Events (Lithuania)

=== March ===
1991 Soviet Union referendum

- March 10 — 500,000-participants rally on Manezhnaya Square in Moscow. The main slogans of the action were the resignation of the President of the USSR Mikhail Gorbachev, support for Boris Yeltsin, active participation in the all-Union referendum. Organizers: Democratic Russia, Moscow Association of Voters, Memorial Society.
- March 17 — 1991 Russian presidential referendum: 71% of the participants voted in favor of introducing the post of the President of Russia. At the same day the referendum on the future of the Soviet Union was held.

=== June ===
- June 12 — 1991 Russian presidential election. Boris Yeltsin and Alexander Rutskoy elected as the first President and Vice President of Russia.

=== July ===
George H.W. Bush and Mikhail Gorbachev sign START I treaty in Moscow

=== August ===
- August 19 to 22— 1991 Soviet coup d'état attempt
- August 19
  - The "State Committee for the State of Emergency" created from the hardline Union-level functioners wishing to reverse the USSR's disintegration. State of emergency declared in certain regions of the country, military units and tanks entered in Moscow.
  - The first President of Russia Boris Yeltsin issued an address "To the citizens of Russia", in which the actions of the State Emergency Committee are characterized as a coup. Yeltsin urged the population to rebuff the putschists. Start of mass pro-democratic rallies in Moscow and Leningrad.
  - August 22 — Putschists arrested. The white-blue-red flag restored as the Russian national flag.

=== December ===
- December 8 — Belovezha Accords signed by Russia, Belarus and Ukraine, declared USSR had effectively ceased to exist and established the Commonwealth of Independent States (CIS).
- December 21 — Alma-Ata Protocol signed by 11 of 15 former union republics except Estonia, Latvia, Lithuania and Georgia, declared USSR had effectively ceased to exist and established the Commonwealth of Independent States (CIS).
- 25 December
  - The sole President of the Soviet Union, Mikhail Gorbachev resigned.
  - Russian Soviet Federative Socialist Republic officially renamed into the Russian Federation.
- December 26 — The Soviet of the Republics, the upper house of the Supreme Soviet of the USSR, declared the dissolution of the Soviet Union.

== Births ==
- 5 March — Daniil Trifonov, Concert Pianist
- 20 July — Marina Yakhlakova, Concert Pianist

== Deaths ==
=== January ===
- January 7 — Kondrat Krapiva, writer (b. 1896)
- January 9 — Salatyn Asgarova, journalist (b. 1961)
- January 19 — Uzeir Abduramanov, Red Army sapper (b. 1916)
- January 23 — Nikolai Talyzin, statesman and economist (b. 1929)
- January 24 — Rudolf Barda, football player (b. 1903)
- January 26 — Mikhail Plyatskovsky, songwriter (b. 1935)

=== February ===
- February 2 — Stanislav Sorokin, amateur boxer (b. 1941)
- February 4 — Juozas Baltusis, writer (b. 1909)
- February 9 — Arkady Migdal, physicist and member of the USSR Academy of Sciences (b. 1911)
- February 14 — Kim Slavin, painter (b. 1928)
- February 15 — Ivan Shkadov, army general (b. 1913)
- February 17 — Madina Gulgun, Iranian-Soviet poet (b. 1926)

=== March ===
- March 1 — Leonid Markov, actor (b. 1927)
- March 2 — Eduard Vanaaseme, Estonian lightweight weightlifter (b. 1898)
- March 3 — Nikolai Bagley, basketball player (b. 1937)
- March 15 — Vladimir Seleznev, realist painter (b. 1928)
- March 25 — Vitaliy Holubyev, football player (b. 1926)

=== April ===
- April 1 — Rina Zelyonaya, actress (b. 1901)
- April 7 — Oleg Babak, army officer (b. 1967)
- April 19 — Dilara Aliyeva, philologist and translator (b. 1929)
- April 21 — Aleksey Vodyagin, footballer and coach (b. 1925)
- April 22 — Mikheil Meskhi, football player (b. 1937)
- April 30
  - Simon Achikgyozyan, Armenian military commander and war hero (b. 1939)
  - Tatul Krpeyan, Armenian military commander and war hero (b. 1965)
  - Juozas Urbsys, Lithuanian diplomat (b. 1896)

=== May ===
- May 9 — Yanka Dyagileva, Siberian poet and singer-songwriter (b. 1966)
- May 11
  - Ulyana Barkova, farm worker (b. 1906)
  - Friedrich Issak, sportsman and journalist (b. 1915)
- May 12 — Konstantin Sokolsky, Latvian singer (b. 1904)
- May 24 — Juozas Udras, Olympic fencer (b. 1925)
- May 31 — Yuri Zhukov, journalist, publicist and political figure (b. 1908)

=== June ===
- June 14 — Vladimir Petrov, spy who defected to Australia (b. 1907)
- June 29 — Valerijonas Sadreika, Lithuanian politician (b. 1938)
- June 30 — Tamara Khanum, dancer (b. 1906)

=== July ===
- July 5 — Valentina Ivashova, film actress (b. 1915)
- July 6 — Victor Korovin, painter (b. 1936)
- July 7 — Ivan Spiridonov, statesman and party leader (b. 1905)
- July 14 — Pavel Morozenko, actor (b. 1939)
- July 20
  - Vugar Huseynov, Azerbaijani soldier (b. 1969)
  - Aleksey Konsovsky, actor (b. 1912)
- July 23
  - Mikhail Yasnov, statesman (b. 1906)
  - Nora Gal, translator (b. 1912)
- July 25 — Lazar Kaganovich, Stalin-era official (b. 1893)

=== August ===
- August 2 — Boris Ugarov, painter (b. 1922)
- August 4 — Yevgeny Dragunov, weapon designer famous for designing the SVD-63 (b. 1920)
- August 5 — Lena Mukhina, diarist during the Siege of Leningrad (b. 1924)
- August 8 — Ivan Kozhedub, World War II fighter ace (b. 1920)
- August 21 — Mikhail Agursky, cyberneticist and dissident (b. 1933)
- August 22 — Boris Pugo, Minister of the Interior and member of the Emergency Committee (GKChP) (b. 1937)
- August 24 — Sergey Akhromeyev, military figure and GKChP assistant (b. 1923)
- August 26
  - Nikolay Kruchina, administrator of affairs of the Central Committee of the Communist Party of the Soviet Union (b. 1928)
  - Vera Stroyena, film director and screenwriter (b. 1903)
- August 27 — Mike Naumenko, rock musician (b. 1955)

=== September ===
- September 2 — Arnold Chernushevich, fencer and Olympic medalist (b. 1933)
- September 5 — Alexander Pushnin, painter (b. 1921)
- September 8 — Latif Karimov, carpet designer (b. 1906)
- September 15 — Sulkhan Tsintsadze, composer (b. 1925)
- September 16 — Olga Spessivtseva, ballerina (b. 1895)
- September 22 — Yevgeny Ivanovsky, military general (b. 1918)
- September 24 — Yusif Aliyev, Azerbaijani soldier (b. 1969)
- September 29 — Yuri Veksler, cinematographer (b. 1940)

=== October ===
- October 1
  - Richard Kuremaa, Estonian football player (b. 1912)
  - Victor Teterin, artist (b. 1922)
- October 3 — Gia Nadareishvili, chess composer (b. 1921)
- October 6
  - Mark Shevelev, polar aviation pioneer (b. 1904)
  - Igor Talkov, rock musician (b. 1956)
- October 8
  - Zoska Veras, writer and poet (b. 1892)
  - Maria Zubreeva, realist painter, watercolorist and graphic artist (b. 1900)
- October 10 — Yaroslav Lesiv, poet and priest (b. 1945)
- October 11 — Lidiya Sukharevskaya, stage actress and playwright (b. 1909)
- October 12 — Arkady Strugatsky, writer (b. 1925)
- October 21 — Lev Chegorovsky, painter (b. 1914)
- October 25 — Tamaz Namgalauri, judoka and Olympian (b. 1957)
- October 26 — Tahira Tahirova, politician and diplomat (b. 1913)
- October 29 — Hikmat Muradov, Azerbaijani soldier (b. 1969)

=== November ===
- November 7 — Valery Alekseyev, anthropologist (b. 1929)
- November 11 — Nadezhda Shteinmiller, artist (b. 1915)
- November 18 — Alexey Tryoshnikov, polar explorer (b. 1914)
- November 19 — Leonid Obolensky, actor (b. 1902)
- November 20
  - Yulia Drunina, poet (b. 1924)
  - Notable Azerbaijanis killed in the 1991 Azerbaijani Mil Mi-8 shootdown
    - Mahammad Asadov, 1st Minister of Internal Affairs of Azerbaijan (b. 1941)
    - Ismat Gayibov, 1st Prosecutor General of Azerbaijan (b. 1942)
    - Zulfi Hajiyev, Deputy Prime Minister of Azerbaijan (b. 1935)
    - Tofig Ismayilov, 1st Secretary of State of Azerbaijan (b. 1933)
    - Vagif Jafarov, Azerbaijani Member of Parliament (b. 1949)
    - Osman Mirzayev, Head of Presidential Administration (b. 1937)
    - Ali Mustafayev, Television journalist (b. 1952)
    - Saylau Serikov, Deputy Minister of Internal Affairs of Azerbaijan (b. 1940)
    - Fakhraddin Shahbazov, cameraman (b. 1950)
- November 22 — Yevgeny Ivanovsky, military general (b. 1918)
- November 29 — Nasirdin Isanov, 1st Prime Minister of Kyrgyzstan (b. 1943)
- November 30 — Mikhail Chaiakhyan, scientist (b. 1902)

=== December ===
- December 1 — Pyotr Pochynchuk, athlete and Olympic medalist (b. 1954)
- December 9 — Olga Bondareva, mathematician and economist (b. 1937)
- December 14 — Nikolay Gusakov, Nordic combined skier and Olympic medalist (b. 1934)
- December 15 — Vasily Zaytsev, sniper during World War II (b.1915)
- December 25 — Gotlib Roninson, actor (b. 1916)
- December 31 — Yuri Belov, actor (b. 1930)

== See also ==
- 1991 in fine arts of the Soviet Union and Russia
- List of Soviet and Russian films of 1991
