= 2008 in Russia =

- Decades: 1980s; 1990s; 2000s; 2010s; 2020s
- See also: History of Russia; Timeline of Russian history; List of years in Russia

Events from the year 2008 in the country of Russia.

== Incumbents ==
- President: Vladimir Putin (until 8 May), Dmitry Medvedev (from 8 May)
- Prime Minister: Viktor Zubkov (until 8 May), Vladimir Putin (from 8 May)
- Minister of Defence: Anatoliy Serdyukov

=== Governors ===
- Amur Oblast: Nikolay Kolesov (ER, until October 16), Oleg Kozhemyako (ER, starting October 20)
- Arkhangelsk Oblast: Nikolai Kiselev (ER, until April 18), Ilya Mikhalchuk (ER, starting April 18)
- Astrakhan Oblast: Alexander Zhilkin (ER)
- Belgorod Oblast: Yevgeny Savchenko (ER)
- Bryansk Oblast: Nikolay Denin (ER)
- Chelyabinsk Oblast: Pyotr Sumin (ER)
- Irkutsk Oblast: Aleksandr Tishanin (ER, until April 15), Igor Esipovsky (ER, starting April 15)
- Ivanovo Oblast: Mikhail Men (ER)
- Kaliningrad Oblast: Georgy Boos (ER)
- Kaluga Oblast: Anatoly Artamonov (ER)
- Kemerovo Oblast: Aman Tuleyev (ER)
- Kirov Oblast: Vladimir Shaklein (ER)
- Kostroma Oblast: Igor Slyunyayev (ER)
- Kurgan Oblast: Oleg Bogomolov (ER)
- Kursk Oblast: Aleksandr Mikhailov (ER)
- Leningrad Oblast: Valery Serdyukov (ER)
- Lipetsk Oblast: Oleg Korolyov (ER)
- Magadan Oblast: Nikolai Dudov (ER)
- Moscow Oblast: Boris Gromov (ER)
- Murmansk Oblast: Yuri Yevdokimov (ER)
- Nizhny Novgorod Oblast: Valery Shantsev (ER)
- Novgorod Oblast: Sergey Mitin (ER)
- Novosibirsk Oblast: Viktor Tolokonsky (ER)
- Omsk Oblast: Leonid Polezhayev (ER)
- Orenburg Oblast: Alexey Chernyshev (ER)
- Oryol Oblast: Yegor Stroyev (ER)
- Penza Oblast: Vasily Bochkarev (ER)
- Pskov Oblast: Mikhail Kuznetsov (ER)
- Rostov Oblast: Vladimir Chub (ER)
- Ryazan Oblast: Georgy Shpak (ER, until April 12), Oleg Kovalyov (ER, starting April 12)
- Sakhalin Oblast: Alexander Khoroshavin (ER)
- Samara Oblast: Vladimir Artemyakov (ER)
- Saratov Oblast: Pavel Ipatov (ER)
- Smolensk Oblast: Sergey Antufyev (ER)
- Tambov Oblast: Oleg Betin (ER)
- Tomsk Oblast: Viktor Kress (ER)
- Tula Oblast: Vyacheslav Dudka (ER)
- Tver Oblast: Dmitry Zelenin (ER)
- Tyumen Oblast: Vladimir Yakushev (ER)
- Ulyanovsk Oblast: Sergey Morozov (ER)
- Vladimir Oblast: Nikolay Vinogradov (CPRF)
- Volgograd Oblast: Nikolai Maksyuta (ER)
- Vologda Oblast: Vyacheslav Pozgalyov (ER)
- Voronezh Oblast: Vladimir Kulakov (ER)
- Yaroslavl Oblast: Sergey Vakhrukov (ER)
- Jewish Autonomous Oblast: Nikolay Volkov (ER)

== Events ==
- February — The Russian group Voina staged the Fuck for the heir Puppy Bear! performance at the Timiryazev State Biological Museum in Moscow to protest at the election of Dmitry Medvedev in the 2008 Russian presidential election.
- March 2 — 2008 Russian presidential election is occurred, Dmitry Medvedev won the election.
- May 7 — Dmitry Medvedev becomes President of Russia.
- May 24 — Dima Bilan wins the Eurovision Song Contest 2008 in Belgrade, Serbia
- August 7–16 — Russia–Georgia war
- August 8–11 — Battle of Tskhinvali
- August 9–12 — Battle of the Kodori Valley
- August 9/10 — Battle off the coast of Abkhazia
- August 9–19 — Occupation of Poti
- August 13–22 — Occupation of Gori

== Deaths ==
=== January ===
- January 1 — Oleg Tolmachev, ice hockey player and coach (b. 1919)
- January 3
  - Aleksandr Abdulov, film and stage actor (b. 1953)
  - Nikolay Puzanov, Russian Soviet biathlete and 1968 Olympic Gold medalist (b. 1938)
- January 4 — Vyacheslav Ambartsumyan, footballer (b. 1940)
- January 7 — Andrey Kurennoy, triple jumper (b. 1972)
- January 10 — Mikhail Minin, Russian soldier who raised the Soviet flag on the Reichstag Building in 1945 (b. 1922)
- January 12
  - Gennady Bachinsky, radio talk show host and producer (b. 1971)
  - Anatoly Kyarov, head of the Kabardino-Balkaria police (b. 1957)
- January 15 — Artyom Sergeyev, Soviet Major general and adopted son of Joseph Stalin (b. 1921)
- January 26 — Igor Dmitriev, film and theatre actor (b. 1927)
- January 27
  - Anna Loginova, fashion model and later trained bodyguard (b. 1978)
  - Valery Shumakov, surgeon and transplantologist (b. 1931)

=== February ===
- February 4 — Nikolay Popov, engineer and designer of the T-80 (b. 1931)
- February 7 — Guy Severin, academician and engineer (b. 1926)
- February 9 — Georgy Yegorov, Fleet Admiral of the Soviet Navy (b. 1918)
- February 12 — Boris Chirikov, physicist (b. 1928)
- February 15 — Mikhail Solomentsev, Soviet politician and bureaucrat (b. 1913)
- February 16 — Boris Khmelnitsky, theatre and movie actor (b. 1940)
- February 19
  - Natalia Bessmertnova, prima ballerina (b. 1941)
  - Yegor Letov, poet, musician, singer-songwriter, audio engineer and conceptual artist (b. 1964)
- February 25 — Vladimir Troshin, film and theater actor and singer (b. 1926)
- February 27 — Anna Andreeva, textile designer (b. 1917)
- February 29 — Vitaly Fedorchuk, 6th Minister of Interior Affairs of the Soviet Union (b. 1918)

=== March ===
- March 1 — Andrey Tissin, sprint canoer (b. 1975)
- March 13 — Iosif Boyarsky, animator and director (b. 1917)
- March 15 — Yury Tsuranov, olympic skeet shooter (b. 1936)
- March 21
  - Gadzhi Abashilov, journalist and chief of VGTRK in Dagestan (b. 1950)
  - Anna Alchuk, poet and visual artist (b. 1955)
  - Ilyas Shurpayev, journalist (b. 1975)
- March 25 — Sergey Kramarenko, football player (b. 1946)
- March 31 — Nikolai Baibakov, Soviet bureaucrat and economist (b. 1911)

=== April ===
- April 7 — Andrei Tolubeyev, stage and film actor (b. 1945)
- April 8 — Nadezhda Rumyantseva, actress (b. 1930)
- April 13 — Khasan Yandiev, deputy head of the Ingushetia Supreme Court (b. 1948)
- April 17
  - Zoya Krakhmalnikova, writer and dissident (b. 1929)
  - Mikhail Tanich, poet (b. 1923)
- April 18 — Refat Appazov, rocket scientist (b. 1920)
- April 26 — Moisey Feigin, artist (b. 1904)

=== May ===
- May 14 — Yuri Rytkheu, Chukchi writer (b. 1930)
- May 16 — Igor Polyakov, rower (b. 1912)
- May 19 — Rimma Kazakova, poet and translator (b. 1932)
- May 20 — Viktor Bortsov, theatrical and cinema actor (b. 1934)
- May 25 — Yuriy Konovalov, sprinter (b. 1929)

=== June ===
- June 3 — Grigory Romanov, 9th First Secretary of the Leningrad Regional Party Committee (b. 1923)
- June 22
  - Natalia Bekhtereva, neuroscientist and psychologist (b. 1924)
  - Fyodor Uglov, surgeon (b. 1904)
- June 24 — Viktor Kuzkin, ice hockey defender (b. 1940)
- June 25 — Alla Kazanskaya, stage and film actress (b. 1920)
- June 28 — Irina Baronova, ballerina and actress (b. 1919)
- June 29 — Vladimir Vinogradov, banker (b. 1955)

=== July ===
- July 6 — Nonna Mordyukova, actress (b. 1925)
- July 11 — Anatoly Pristavkin, writer and public figure (b. 1931)
- July 15
  - Yuri Mikhaylov, speed skater (b. 1930)
  - Gennadi Volnov, basketball player (b. 1939)
- July 25 — Mikhail Pugovkin, comic actor (b. 1923)
- July 28 — Anatoly Tyazhlov, 1st Governor of Moscow Oblast (b. 1942)

=== August ===
- August 3 — Aleksandr Solzhenitsyn, author and dissident (b. 1918)
- August 9 — Denis Vetchinov, Russian Ground Forces major (b. 1976)
- August 19 — Mikhail Mukasei, spy (b. 1907)

=== September ===
- September 2 — Abdulla Alishayev, journalist and writer (b. 1969)
- September 10 — Yuri Osipyan, physicist (b. 1931)
- September 14 — Gennady Troshev, colonel general and former commander of the North Caucasus Military District (b. 1947)
- September 16 — Andrei Volkonsky, composer (b. 1933)
- September 24 — Ruslan Yamadayev, Chechen warlord and member of Russian State Duma (b. 1961)

=== October ===
- October 1 — Boris Yefimov, political cartoonist (b. 1900)
- October 10 — Alexey Prokurorov, cross-country skier (b. 1964)
- October 25 — Muslim Magomayev, opera and pop singer (b. 1942)
- October 30 — Valentin Bubukin, footballer (b. 1933)

=== November ===
- November 2 — Joseph Alliluyev, cardiologist and a grandson of former Soviet leader Joseph Stalin (b. 1945)
- November 4 — Khertek Anchimaa-Toka, 8th Chairwoman of the Presidium of the Little Khural of the Tuvan People's Republic (b. 1912)
- November 20 — Boris Fyodorov, politician and economist (b. 1958)
- November 26 — Vitaly Karayev, mayor of Vladikavkaz (b. 1962)
- November 29 — Georgi Vyun, football player and coach (b. 1944)

=== December ===
- December 2 — Pyotr Latyshev, 1st Russian Presidential Envoy to the Urals Federal District (b. 1948)
- December 5 — Patriarch Alexy II of Moscow, 15th Patriarch of Moscow and all Rus' (b. 1929)
- December 9 — Yuri Glazkov, cosmonaut (b. 1939)
- December 15 — Valentin Berlinsky, cellist (b. 1925)
- December 17 — Nina Varlamova, mayor of Kandalaksha (b. 1954)
- December 20 — Olga Lepeshinskaya, ballerina (b. 1916)
- December 31 — Kazbek Pagiyev, mayor of Vladikavkaz (b. 1959)

== See also ==
- List of Russian films of 2008
