= 1964 in the Soviet Union =

- Decades: 1940s; 1950s; 1960s; 1970s; 1980s
- See also: History of the Soviet Union; List of years in the Soviet Union

The following lists events that happened during 1964 in the Union of Soviet Socialist Republics.

== Incumbents ==
- First Secretary of the Communist Party of the Soviet Union:

Nikita Khrushchev (Until October 14)
Leonid Brezhnev (Starting October 14)

- Chairman of the Presidium of the Supreme Soviet of the Soviet Union:

Leonid Brezhnev (Until July 15)
Anastas Mikoyan (Starting July 15)

- Chairman of the Council of Ministers of the Soviet Union:

Nikita Khrushchev (Until October 15)
Alexei Kosygin (Starting October 15)

== Events ==
=== October ===
- October 12 — Voskhod 1 is the first space flight to carry more than one crewmen into orbit, and the first space flight without the use of spacesuits.
- October 14-15 — Khrushchev ousted from government by Leonid Brezhnev, Replaced as First Secretary by Brezhnev and as Chairman of the Council by Alexei Kosygin
- October 10-24 — Soviet Athletes compete in 1964 Summer Olympics, Placing second place behind the United States with 96 medals (30 Gold, 31 Silver, 35 Bronze)

== Births ==
- January 1 — Aleksandr Lapin, Russian army officer and commander of the Leningrad Military District
- January 4 — Alexandre Fadeev, figure skater
- February 4 — Vyacheslav Volodin, 5th Chairman of the State Duma of the Russian Federation
- February 9 — Vladislav Vetrov, Soviet and Russian theater and film actor, director and writer
- February 16 — Valentina Yegorova, Russian long-distance runner
- February 28 — Djamolidine Abdoujaparov, Uzbekistani road racing cyclist
- March 7 — Vladimir Smirnov, Kazakh cross-country skier
- March 25 — Dmitry Selivanov, Siberian rock singer (d. 1989)
- April 3 — Yelena Ruzina, Russian Olympic athlete
- April 13 — Dokka Umarov, Chechen mujahid and Emir of the Caucasus Emirate (d. 2013)
- April 17 — Tahmasib Ajdarov, Azerbaijani scientist and Doctor of Economics
- April 21 — Ludmila Engquist, Russian-Swedish athlete
- May 19 — Gitanas Nauseda, 9th President of Lithuania
- June 13 — Sarunas Marciulionis, Lithuanian basketball player
- June 20 — Ethella Chupryk, Ukrainian pianist (d. 2019)
- July 3 — Aleksei Serebryakov, Russian stage actor
- August 1 — Natalya Shikolenko, Belarusian javelin thrower
- August 24 — Salizhan Sharipov, Russian cosmonaut and astronaut
- August 25 — Maxim Kontsevich, Russian mathematician
- September 3 — Ricochet, Russian singer-songwriter (d. 2007)
- September 10 — Yegor Letov, singer (d. 2008)
- September 14 — Akylbek Japarov, 2nd Chairman of the Cabinet of Ministers of Kyrgyzstan
- October 2 — Makharbek Khadartsev, Russian free-style wrestler
- October 22 — Zurab Nogaideli, 5th Prime Minister of Georgia
- November 28 — Giorgi Bagaturov, Georgian-Armernian chess grandmaster
- December 15 — Kubatbek Boronov, 21st Prime Minister of Kyrgyzstan
- December 19 — Arvydas Sabonis, Lithuanian basketball player

== Deaths ==
- January 31 — Kanysh Satbayev, academician and geologist (b. 1899)
- February 3
  - Allaberdy Berdyev, 2nd Chairman of the Supreme Soviet of the Turkmen SSR (b. 1904)
  - Ivan Zarubin, linguist specializing in the Pamir languages (b. 1887)
- April 26 — Mikhail Parsegov, colonel general and military commander (b. 1899)
- May 17 — Otto Kuusinen, 1st Chairman of the Presidium of the Supreme Soviet of the Karelo-Finnish SSR (b. 1881)
- June 16 — Lidia Klement, singer (b. 1937)
- June 20 — Vasily Kuznetsov, general (b. 1894)
- June 28 — Ilya Smirnov, army general (b. 1887)
- June 30 — Alexander Bubnov, avant-garde painter and Socialist realist (b. 1908)
- July 4 — Samuil Marshak, writer (b. 1887)
- July 13 — Mikhail Nazvanov, stage and film actor (b. 1914)
- July 22 — Leonid Baratov, opera director (b. 1895)
- August 12 — Dmitry Maksutov, optical engineer and inventor of the Maksutov telescope (b. 1896)
- August 22 — Symeon Lukach, Ukrainian Greek Catholic Bishop and martyr (b. 1893)
- August 27 — Aleksey Zhivotov, composer (b. 1904)
- August 30 — Aleksei Grechkin, army commander (b. 1893)
- September 14 — Vasily Grossman, writer and journalist (b. 1905)
- September 28 — Mikhail Svetlov, poet (b. 1903)
- October 19
  - Sergey Biryuzov, 5th Chief of the General Staff of the Soviet Armed Forces (b. 1904)
  - Nikolay Shkodunovich, lieutenant general (b. 1900)
  - Vladimir Zhdanov, colonel-general (b. 1902)
- October 25 — Terenty Shtykov, general and 1st Ambassador of the Soviet Union to North Korea (b. 1907)
- October 29 — Vasily Agapkin, conductor, composer, and author of the march "Farewell of Slavianka" (b. 1884)
- November 16 — Nikolai Vedeneyev, lieutenant general (b. 1897)
- December 7 — Nikolay Anichkov, pathologist (b. 1885)
- December 24 — Kuksha of Odessa, Ukrainian Orthodox Church priest (b. 1875)
- December 29 — Vladimir Favorsky, artist and engraver (b. 1886)

== See also ==
- 1964 in fine arts of the Soviet Union
- List of Soviet films of 1964
