= 1963 in the Soviet Union =

- Decades: 1940s; 1950s; 1960s; 1970s; 1980s
- See also: History of the Soviet Union; List of years in the Soviet Union

The following lists events that happened during 1963 in the Union of Soviet Socialist Republics.

== Incumbents ==
- First Secretary of the Communist Party of the Soviet Union:

Nikita Khrushchev

- Chairman of the Presidium of the Supreme Soviet of the Soviet Union:

Leonid Brezhnev

- Chairman of the Council of Ministers of the Soviet Union:

Nikita Khrushchev

== Events ==
=== June ===
- June 16 — Valentina Tereshkova, aboard Vostok 6, is the first woman in space

=== December ===
- December 18 — Ghanaian students protest in Red Square during the 1963 Moscow protest

== Births ==
- January 10 — Kira Ivanova, Russian figure skater (d. 2001)
- February 4 — Sergei Pugachev, Russian businessman and politician
- February 25 — Merab Katsitadze, Georgian footballer
- April 12 — Anton Siluanov, Russian economist and current Minister of Finance
- April 13 — Garry Kasparov, Russian chess grandmaster and former World Chess Champion
- April 24 — Tõnu Trubetsky, Estonian punk rock musician
- May 25 — Eha Rünne, Estonian shot putter and discus thrower
- June 1 — Igor Zhelezovski, Soviet and Belarusian speed skater (d. 2021)
- June 17 — Temir Sariyev, 17th Prime Minister of Kyrgyzstan
- June 26
  - Mikhail Khodorkovsky, exiled Russian businessman, oligarch and opposition activist
- Farukh Ruzimatov, Uzbek-Russian ballet dancer
- July 8 — Dmitry Pevtsov, Russian actor and politician
- July 12 — Aleksandr Domogarov, Soviet and Russian theater actor, TV presenter and chanson singer
- July 20 — Alexander Zhulin, Russian ice dancing coach and former competitor
- August 14 — Karen Karapetyan, 14th Prime Minister of Armenia
- August 15 — Valery Levaneuski, Belarusian political and social activist
- October 6 — Vasile Tarlev, 6th Prime Minister of Moldova
- October 13 — Bakhytjan Sagintayev, 9th Prime Minister of Kazakhstan
- October 20 — Iurie Leanca, 9th Prime Minister of Moldova
- October 27 — Sergey Smiryagin, Russian freestyle swimmer (d. 2020)
- December 4 — Sergey Bubka, Ukrainian former pole vaulter
- December 9 — Zurab Zhvania, 4th Prime Minister of Georgia (d. 2005)
- December 14 — Vytautas Juozapaitis, Lithuanian singer
- December 21 — Dmitry Rogozin, Russian politician, co-founder of the far-right party Rodina and Senator of the Russian Occupied Zaporozhye Oblast

== Deaths ==
- January 20 — Fyodor Terentyev, cross-country skier (b. 1925)
- January 31 — Alasgar Alakbarov, actor (b. 1910)
- February 15 — Nikanor Zakhvatayev, general and army commander (b. 1898)
- February 27 — Vladimir Konashevich, graphic artist and illustrator (b. 1888)
- March 30 — Alexander Gauk, conductor and composer (b. 1893)
- May 3 — Vladimir Sviridov, military commander and lieutenant general of artillery (b. 1897)
- May 16 — Oleg Penkovsky, British spy and GRU colonel (b. 1919)
- May 23 — August Jakobson, writer and politician (b. 1904)
- May 29 — Vissarion Shebalin, composer and music pedagogue (b. 1902)
- June 18 — Boris Korolyov, sculptor (b. 1885)
- August 15 — Timofei Strokach, prominent military figure of the NKVD and KGB (b. 1903)
- August 20 — Alexander Utvenko, lieutenant general (b. 1905)
- September 9 — Archie Johnstone, Scottish journalist, hotelier and humanitarian who defected to the Soviet Union (b. 1896)
- October 18 — Andrey Kravchenko, colonel general (b. 1899)
- November 3 — Augusts Kirhenšteins, 1st Chairman of the Presidium of the Latvian Soviet Socialist Republic (b. 1872)
- November 25 — Alexander Marinesko, naval officer (b. 1913)

== See also ==
- 1963 in fine arts of the Soviet Union
- List of Soviet films of 1963
