= 1971 in the Soviet Union =

- Decades: 1950s; 1960s; 1970s; 1980s; 1990s
- See also: History of the Soviet Union; List of years in the Soviet Union

The following lists events that happened during 1971 in the Union of Soviet Socialist Republics.

== Incumbents ==
- General Secretary of the Communist Party of the Soviet Union: Leonid Brezhnev
- Premier of the Soviet Union: Nikolai Bulganin
- Chairman of the Presidium of the Supreme Soviet of the Russian SFSR: Mikhail Yasnov

== Events ==
=== January ===
- January 1 — Veronika Mavrikievna and Avdotya Nikitichna, a comic variety duet of actors, appear in the telecast 'Terem-Teremok'.

=== April ===
- April 19 — The Soviet Union launches Salyut 1.

== Births ==
- January 31 —Andriy Parubiy, Ukrainian politician (d. 2025)
- February 8 — Dmitry Nelyubin, track cyclist (d. 2005)
- February 27 — Zaal Udumashvili, Georgian politician
- March 31 — Pavel Bure, Russian ice hockey player
- April 3 — Anastasia Zavorotnyuk, Russian actress and television presenter (d. 2024)
- April 21 — Valentin Morkov, Russian professional football coach and a former player
- July 22 — Mikheil Kavelashvili, 6th President of Georgia
- August 5 — Valdis Dombrovskis, 20th Prime Minister of Latvia
- September 1 — Gennady Bachinsky, Russian TV and radio host (d. 2008)
- December 15 — Vasily Aleksanyan, Russian lawyer and a former Executive Vice President of Yukos oil company (d. 2011)
- December 25 — Vladislav Galkin, Russian actor (d. 2010)

== Deaths ==
- January 10 — Nadezhda Peshkova, artist (b. 1901)
- January 31 — Viktor Zhirmunsky, literary historian and linguist (b. 1891)
- April 2 — Vladimir Krinsky, artist and architect (b. 1890)
- April 12 — Igor Tamm, physicist, Nobel Prize laureate (b. 1895)
- April 29 — Nikolai Barabashov, Ukrainian astronomer (b. 1894)
- June 18 — Vladimir Biryukov, lexicographer (b. 1888)
- June 29 — Crew of Soyuz 11
  - Georgy Dobrovolsky (b. 1928)
  - Viktor Patsayev (b. 1933)
  - Vladislav Volkov (b. 1935)
- July 22 — Roman Mashkov, military intelligence officer (b. 1922)
- September 11 — Nikita Khrushchev, 3rd Leader of the Soviet Union (b. 1894)
- September 18 — Aleksandr Prokofiev, poet (b. 1900)
- September 28 — Vasily Butusov, footballer (b. 1892)
- October 17 — Sergey Kavtaradze, politician and diplomat (b. 1885)
- October 20 — Nikolai Basistiy, Soviet Navy officer (b. 1898)
- November 1 — Mikhail Romm, film director, screenwriter and pedagogue (b. 1901)
- November 15 — Rudolf Abel, intelligence officer (b. 1903)
- November 29 — Ivan Samylovsly, diplomat, politician and journalist (b. 1905)
- December 5 — Andrey Andreyev, former Deputy Chairman of the Council of Ministers of the Soviet Union (b. 1895)
- December 8 — Ernst Krenkel, Arctic explorer and radio operator (b. 1903)
- December 18 — Aleksandr Tvardovsky, poet and writer (b. 1910)

== See also ==
- 1971 in fine arts of the Soviet Union
- List of Soviet films of 1971
