= 1962 in the Soviet Union =

- Decades: 1940s; 1950s; 1960s; 1970s; 1980s
- See also: History of the Soviet Union; List of years in the Soviet Union

The following lists events that happened during 1962 in the Union of Soviet Socialist Republics.

== Incumbents ==
- First Secretary of the Communist Party of the Soviet Union — Nikita Khrushchev
- Chairman of the Presidium of the Supreme Soviet of the Soviet Union — Leonid Brezhnev
- Chairman of the Council of Ministers of the Soviet Union — Nikita Khrushchev

== Events ==
- 1962 Soviet nuclear tests
- Operation Anadyr

=== June ===
- June 1–2 — Novocherkassk massacre
- June 17 — K-3 becomes the first Soviet submarine to reach the North Pole.
- June 30 — Aeroflot Flight 902 crashes 28 kilometers east of Krasnoyarsk airport, killing all 84 on board.

=== October ===
- October 14–28 — The Cuban Missile Crisis occurs between the United States and Soviet Union over the deployment of Soviet ballistic missiles to Cuba.

== Births ==
- January 1 — Vladimir Popov, Russian wrestler (d. 2025)
- January 4 — Natalya Bochina, sprinter
- January 17 — Igor Surovikin, Russian professional football coach and former player
- January 22 — Lyudmila Dzhigalova, Russian athlete
- April 6 — Natalie Holland, Russian-born contemporary artist
- August 30 — Alexander Litvinenko, former KGB and FSB colonel (d. 2006)
- September 5 — Tatyana Koshkaryova, Russian journalist
- November 5 – Irina Mishina, Russian journalist and television presenter

== Deaths ==
- January 6 — Marziyya Davudova, actress (b. 1901)
- February 22 — Boris Vannikov, politician and political commissar (b. 1897)
- March 11 — Viacheslav Ragozin, chess player, writer and editor (b. 1908)
- March 19 — Vasily Stalin, general and son of Joseph Stalin (b. 1921)
- June 9 — Andrey Khrulyov, military commander (b. 1892)
- June 16 — Aleksei Antonov, general (b. 1896)
- June 27 — Paul Viiding, poet, author and literary critic (b. 1904)
- September 19 — Nikolai Pogodin, playwright (b. 1900)
- October 28 — Vera Pashennaya, stage and film actress and pedagogue (b. 1887)

== See also ==
- 1962 in fine arts of the Soviet Union
- List of Soviet films of 1962
