= Morkov (surname) =

Morkov (Russian: Морков; feminine: Morkova) is a Russian surname associated with the noble Russian Morkov family. Notable people with the surname include:

- Arkady Morkov (1747–1827), Russian noble and diplomat
- Valentin Morkov (born 1971), Russian football player and coach

== See also ==
- Markov, a Bulgarian and Russian surname
- Morkovkin, a Russian surname
- Mørkøv (surname), a Danish surname
- Stelică Morcov, Romanian wrestler
