= Morkov =

Morkov may refer to:

- Morkov (surname), a Russian surname
- Mørkøv (surname), a Danish surname
- Mořkov, a municipality and village in the Czech Republic
- Mørkøv, a town in Denmark
  - Mørkøv railway station
