= 1945 in the Soviet Union =

- Decades: 1920s; 1930s; 1940s; 1950s; 1960s
- See also: History of the Soviet Union; List of years in the Soviet Union

The following lists events that happened during 1945 in the Union of Soviet Socialist Republics.

== Incumbents ==
- General Secretary of the Communist Party of the Soviet Union — Joseph Stalin
- Chairman of the Presidium of the Supreme Soviet of the Soviet Union — Mikhail Kalinin
- Chairman of the Council of People's Commissars of the Soviet Union — Joseph Stalin

== Events ==
Moscow Victory Parade of 1945, June 24.

- January 12 — WWII: The Soviet Union begins the Vistula–Oder Offensive in Eastern Europe, against the German Army.
- January 13 — WWII: The Soviet Union begins the East Prussian Offensive, to eliminate German forces in East Prussia.
- January 17 — WWII: The Soviet Union occupies Warsaw, Poland.
- May 2 — WWII: The Soviet Union captures and occupies Berlin, Germany.
- May 9 — Joseph Stalin declares victory over Nazi Germany during a speech broadcast on radio.
- June 24 — Moscow Victory Parade
- August 9 — WWII: The Soviet Union declared war on Japan shortly after the Atomic bombing of Nagasaki. The Soviets began to invade the Japanese-held puppet region of Manchuria, while the 25th Army advanced into northern Korea.
- September 19 — The former guerilla fighter Kim Il Sung, a Red Army captain, returned to northern Korea occupied by the Soviets.
- October 14 — Kim Il Sung makes his first major public appearance in Pyongyang in Soviet-occupied northern Korea at the celebration of liberation where he is officially introduced to the public by the authorities as a national hero, a legendary guerrilla fighter and leader.

== Births ==
- January 3 — Yaroslav Lesiv, Ukrainian poet and priest (d. 1991)
- January 9 — Levon Ter-Petrosyan, 1st President of Armenia
- February 10 — Vladimir Shumeyko, 1st Chairman of the Federation Council of Russia
- February 28 — Alexey Ekimov, Russian solid state physicist
- March 13 — Anatoly Fomenko, Russian mathematician
- March 22 — Givi Gumbaridze, 15th First Secretary of the Georgian Communist Party
- March 26 — Mikhail Voronin, Soviet and Russian gymnast (d. 2004)
- March 28 — Raine Loo, Estonian actress (d. 2020)
- March 31 — Lidiya Belozyorova, Ukrainian actress (d. 2022)
- May 6 — Besarion Gugushvili, 1st Prime Minister of Georgia
- May 14 — Vladislav Ardzinba, 1st President of Abkhazia (d. 2010)
- May 20 — Aleksandr Belyakov, 1st Governor of Leningrad Oblast
- May 22 — Joseph Alliluyev, Russian cardiologist and grandson of Joseph Stalin (d. 2008)
- June 11 — Valery Chaptynov, 1st Head of the Altai Republic (d. 1997)
- June 19 — Natalya Seleznyova, Soviet and Russian theater and film actress
- July 19 — Oleg Fotin, Russian swimmer
- August 4 — Gennady Burbulis, Russian politician (d. 2022)
- August 9 — Zurab Sakandelidze, Georgian basketball player (d. 2004)
- August 14 — Valeriy Shmarov, 3rd Minister of Defence of Ukraine (d. 2018)
- August 29 — Alyosha Abrahamyan, Armenian footballer (d. 2018)
- September 23 — Igor Ivanov, 3rd Minister of Foreign Affairs of Russia
- September 29 — Nadezhda Chizhova, Russian athlete
- October 3 — Viktor Saneyev, Georgian triple jumper, Olympic champion (d. 2022)
- November 5 — Nikolai Tanayev, 8th Prime Minister of Kyrgyzstan (d. 2020)
- November 11 — Gennady Savelyev, 2nd Head of Komi-Permyak Autonomous Okrug
- November 13 — Vladislav Achalov, Soviet and Russian general, politician and public figure (d. 2011)
- December 10 — Yury Yevdokimov, 2nd Governor of Murmansk Oblast
- December 21 — Mari Lill, Estonian actress
- December 24 — Avtandil Margiani, 16th First Secretary of the Georgian Communist Party

== Deaths ==
- January 6 — Vladimir Vernadsky, mineralogist and geochemist (b. 1863)
- February 18 — Ivan Chernyakhovsky, general (b. 1907)
- February 23 — Aleksey Nikolayevich Tolstoy, writer (b. 1883)
- March 3 — Aleksandra Samusenko, WWII tank commander (b. 1922)
- March 26 — Boris Shaposhnikov, military leader (b. 1882)
- May 7 — Vladimir Boyarsky, army officer (b. 1901)
- May 10 — Aleksandr Shcherbakov, 15th First Secretary of the Moscow City Committee of the Communist Party of the Soviet Union (b. 1901)
- May 25 — Demyan Bedny, poet (b. 1883)
- June 16 — Nikolai Berzarin, Red Army general (b. 1904)
- June 30 — Gabriel El-Registan, poet (b. 1899)
- July 12 — Boris Galerkin, mathematician (b. 1871)
- October 20 — Varvara Massalitinova, stage and film actress (b. 1878)

== See also ==
- 1945 in fine arts of the Soviet Union
- List of Soviet films of 1945
