= Surovikin =

Surovikin (Russian: Сурови́кин) is a Russian masculine surname; its feminine counterpart is Surovikina. It may refer to the following notable people:

- Igor Surovikin (born 1962), Russian football coach and player
- Sergey Surovikin (born 1966), Russian Armed Forces general of the army
