= 1966 in the Soviet Union =

- Decades: 1940s; 1950s; 1960s; 1970s; 1980s
- See also: History of the Soviet Union; List of years in the Soviet Union

The following lists events that happened during 1966 in the Union of Soviet Socialist Republics.

== Incumbents ==
- First Secretary of the Communist Party of the Soviet Union:

Leonid Brezhnev

- Chairman of the Presidium of the Supreme Soviet of the Soviet Union:

Nikolai Podgorny

- Chairman of the Council of Ministers of the Soviet Union:

Alexei Kosygin

== Events ==
=== February ===
- February 3 – The unmanned Soviet Luna 9 spacecraft makes the first controlled rocket-assisted landing on the Moon.
- February 10 – Soviet fiction writers Yuli Daniel and Andrei Sinyavsky are sentenced to five and seven years, respectively, for "anti-Soviet" writings.
- February 20 – While Soviet author and translator Valery Tarsis is abroad, the Soviet Union negates his citizenship.

=== March ===
- March 1 - Soviet space probe Venera 3 crashes on Venus, becoming the first spacecraft to land on another planet's surface.
- March 29 – The 23rd Congress of the Communist Party of the Soviet Union is held: Leonid Brezhnev demands that U.S. troops leave Vietnam, and announces that Chinese-Soviet relations are not satisfactory.
- March 31 – The Soviet Union launches Luna 10, which becomes the first space probe to enter orbit around the Moon.

=== April ===
- April 8 - Leonid Brezhnev becomes General Secretary of the Soviet Union, as well as Leader of the Communist Party of the U.S.S.R.
- April 27 – Pope Paul VI and Soviet Foreign Minister Andrei Gromyko meet in the Vatican (the first meeting between leaders of the Roman Catholic Church and the Soviet Union).

=== May ===
- May 4 - Fiat signs a contract with the Soviet government to build a car factory in the Soviet Union.

=== July ===
- July 16 – British Prime Minister Harold Wilson flies to Moscow to try to start peace negotiations about the Vietnam War (the Soviet government rejects his ideas).

=== October ===
- October 7 – The Soviet Union declares that all Chinese students must leave the country before the end of October.
- October 11 – France and the Soviet Union sign a treaty for cooperation in nuclear research.

== Births ==
- 3 March – Mikhail Mishustin, Prime Minister of Russia
- 15 August – Marat Minibayev, former Russian professional footballer
- 17 July - Taras Nahorniak, Ukrainian geographer

== Deaths ==
- January 14 – Sergei Korolev, rocket engineer and spacecraft designer (b. 1907)
- March 5 – Anna Akhmatova, poet (b. 1889)
- May 7 – Usman Yusupov, 7th First Secretary of the Communist Party of Uzbekistan (b. 1901)
- September 14 – Nikolay Cherkasov, actor (b. 1903)
- September 19 – Vladimir Fyodorov, scientist and general (b. 1874)
- October 17 – Zhumabay Shayakhmetov, 4th First Secretary of the Communist Party of Kazakhstan (b. 1902)
- October 28 – Nikolai Belyaev, 8th First Secretary of the Communist Party of Kazakhstan (b. 1903)
- November 14 – Nikolai Ignatov, 6th & 8th Chairman of the Presidium of the Supreme Soviet of the Russian SFSR (b. 1901)
- December 19 – Betty Kuuskemaa, Estonian stage and film actress (b. 1879)
- December 31 – Elena Stasova, Russian Soviet Revolutionary and Old Bolshevik (b. 1873)

== See also ==
- 1966 in fine arts of the Soviet Union
- List of Soviet films of 1966
