= List of members of the Supreme Soviet of the Estonian Soviet Socialist Republic, 1955–1959 =

This is a list of members of the fourth legislature of the Supreme Soviet of the Estonian Soviet Socialist Republic which was the Estonian Soviet Socialist Republic's legislative chamber between 1940 and 1941, and between 1944 and 1992. The session ran from 4 March 1955 to 4 March 1959, and followed the 1955 Estonian Supreme Soviet election in which only Bloc of Communists and Non-Party Candidates was the only party able to contest the elections.

== List of members ==
Source: Jaan Toomla, Valitud ja Valitsenud: Eesti parlamentaarsete ja muude esinduskogude ning valitsuste isikkoosseis aastail 1917–1999 (National Library of Estonia, 1999), pp. 91–93.

Name	Party
Georg Abels	NLKP
Amalie Aberg	
Karl Allikas	NLKP
Valter Ani	NLKP
Aleksander Ansberg	NLKP
Rosamunde Aulas	-, NLKP
Eduard Aus	
Aliide Auu	NLKP
Hilda Aver	
Ivan Beljajev	NLKP
Grigori Bõstrikov	NLKP
Johan Eichfeld	
Gustav Ernesaks	
Marta Esser	
Ivan Feofanov	
Georgi Filippov	NLKP
August Goldberg	NLKP
Fjodor Gukov	NLKP
Ida Gutves	
Linda Heero	NLKP
Aleksandr Hromov	NLKP
Nikita Hruštšov	NLKP
Kalju Hüsse	
Osvald llbis	
August Jakobson	NLKP
Otto Joost	NLKP
Oskar Jõgi	
Ida Jürna	NLKP
Eha Kaarus	
Leida Kaldra	-, NLKP
Ivan Karpov	NLKP
Vaike Karu	
Leida-Johanna Karus	NLKP
Vladimir Kassatonov	NLKP
Arkadi Kello	NLKP
Valter Klauson (Klaussen)	NLKP
Minna Klement	NLKP
Voldemar Komusaar	NLKP
Karl Koppel	NLKP
Kaarel Kütsar	NLKP
August Kründel	NLKP
Eduard Kubjas	NLKP
Karl Kukk	NLKP
Richard Kurvits	NLKP
Dimitri Kuzmin	NLKP
August Kuusk	NLKP
Ivan Käbin	NLKP
Hilda Käosaar	NLKP
Aleksander Laansalu	-, NLKP
Genrich Laura	NLKP
Aleksandr Lebedev	NLKP
Hilda Leesment	NLKP
Leonid Lentsman	NLKP
Arseni Leonov	NLKP
Magda Lillemägi	
Adele Lokk	
Olga Lund (Gerretz)	NLKP
Voldemar Luts	NLKP
Voldemar Maasik	
Georgi Malenkov	NLKP
August Maripuu	
Jaan Masing	NLKP
Rudolf Meijel	NLKP
Otto Merimaa	NLKP
Salme Metsailu	
Aleksander Mette	NLKP
Vjatšeslav Molotov	NLKP
Julius Murd	NLKP
Ermina Mäe	ÜLKNÜ
Hilja Mäeots	
Helmi Mägis	
Johanna Mühlmann	
Aleksei Müürisepp	NLKP
Gustav Naan	NLKP
Magdalena Nahkor	
Georg Nellis	NLKP
Richard Niinepuu	NLKP
Lembit Nukk	NLKP
Anna Nõmm	
Voldemar Oja	NLKP
Danil Onjanov	NLKP
Toivo Osul	NLKP
Kaarel Paas (Pauk)	NLKP
Helene Palts	NLKP
Aleksandr Pankratov	NLKP
Boris Petrov	NLKP
Klaara Priimak	
Aarne Pung	
Endel Puusepp	NLKP
August Pähn	
Aadu Pärtel	
Marie Rajala	
Ernst Ristmägi	NLKP
Pjotr Romaškin	NLKP
Lidia Roots	NLKP
Eha Ruven	
Joosep Saat	NLKP
Ludvig Schmidt	NLKP
Marta Serel	NLKP
Pavel Skutski	NLKP
Juhan Smuul	NLKP
Aleksandr Sokolov	NLKP
Arthur Soolau	NLKP
Elmar Soolo	NLKP
Maria-Elisaveta Süia	
Leida Sõrmus	
Mihhail Šturm	NLKP
Selma Talvik	NLKP
Leida Tammis	
Viktor Tideman	NLKP
Anatoli Tihane	NLKP
Rudolf Tiidenberg	
Karl Tisler	
Velli Treu	
Stepan Tšernikov	NLKP
Nikolai Turkestanov	NLKP
Johan Ulfsak	NLKP
Johannes Undusk	NLKP
Fjodor Ušanjov	NLKP
Mäns Uus	NLKP
Albert Vendelin	NLKP
August Viiu	
Isi Viiu (Koovits)	
Erna Visk	NLKP
Otto Väinsalu	NLKP
