= 1965 in the Soviet Union =

- Decades: 1940s; 1950s; 1960s; 1970s; 1980s
- See also: History of the Soviet Union; List of years in the Soviet Union

The following lists events that happened during 1965 in the Union of Soviet Socialist Republics.

== Incumbents ==
- First Secretary of the Communist Party of the Soviet Union:

Leonid Brezhnev

- Chairman of the Presidium of the Supreme Soviet of the Soviet Union:

Anastas Mikoyan (Until 9 December 1965)
Nikolai Podgorny (Starting 9 December 1965)

- Chairman of the Council of Ministers of the Soviet Union:

Alexei Kosygin

== Events ==
=== February ===
- February 4 — Trofim Lysenko is removed from his post as director of the Institute of Genetics at the Academy of Sciences in the Soviet Union. Lysenkoist theories are now treated as pseudoscience.
- February 6 — Premier Alexei Kosygin visits Hanoi as a member of a diplomatic mission to announce further military aid for North Vietnam.

=== March ===
- March 18 — Alexei Leonov aboard the Voskhod 2 becomes the first person to conduct a spacewalk, lasting 12 minutes.
- March 24 — Soviet leader Leonid Brezhnev accuses the United States of 'pirate raids' against North Vietnam.

=== April ===
- April 24 — The 1965 Yerevan Demonstrations took in honor 50th anniversary of the Armenian Genocide, seeking further recognition.

=== May ===
- May 9 — The 1965 Moscow Victory Day Parade is held to commemorate the 20th anniversary of the defeat of Nazi Germany in WW2.

=== September ===
- September 18 — Soviet Premier Alexei Kosygin invites the leaders of India and Pakistan to meet in the Soviet Union to negotiate.
- The Central Committee ratifies the 1965 Soviet Economic Reform (sometimes called the Kosygin Reform).

== Births ==
- January 12 — Nikolai Borschevsky, Russian ice hockey player
- January 14 — Shamil Basayev, Chechen guerrilla leader (d. 2006)
- January 23 — Armen Darbinyan, 7th Prime Minister of Armenia
- January 26 — Natalia Yurchenko, artistic gymnast
- May 15 — Gulshara Abdykhalikova, 11th State Secretary of Kazakhstan
- June 1 — Larisa Lazutina, cross-country skier
- June 15 — Karim Massimov, 7th Prime Minister of Kazakhstan
- September 14 — Dmitry Medvedev, 3rd President of Russia
- September 26
  - Alexei Mordashov, Russian billionaire businessman
  - Petro Poroshenko, 5th President of Ukraine
- October 14 — Jüri Jaanson, Estonian rower
- October 23 — Asqar Mamin, 10th Prime Minister of Kazakhstan
- October 30 — Zaza Urushadze, Georgian film director, screenwriter and producer (d. 2019)
- November 30 — Radion Gataullin, pole vaulter
- December 30 — Valentina Legkostupova, pop singer, teacher and producer (d. 2020)

== Deaths ==
- January 3 — Alexander Poskrebyshev, former Head of the Special Section of the Central Committee of the Communist Party of the Soviet Union (b. 1891)
- January 17 — Alexander Sirotkin, lieutenant general and division commander (b. 1890)
- January 30 — Frol Kozlov, member of the 20th–21st and 22nd Politburo of the Communist Party of the Soviet Union (b. 1908)
- February 2 — Alexander Akimov, lieutenant general (b. 1895)
- February 18 — Yevgeny Charushin, illustrator and author (b. 1901)
- March 3 — Vincas Vitkauskas, general (b. 1890)
- March 20 — Ivan Boldin, senior Red Army general (b. 1892)
- April 9 — Anton Lopatin, lieutenant general (b. 1897)
- May 1 — Stepan Povetkin, lieutenant general (b. 1895)
- May 27 — Yevgeny Pavlovsky, zoologist and entomologist (b. 1884)
- May 28 — Vladimir Gardin, film director and actor (b. 1877)
- June 21 — Piotr Buchkin, painter, watercolorist, graphic artist, illustrator and art teacher (b. 1886)
- July 16 — Nikoloz Berdzenishvili, historian (b. 1895)
- August 27
  - Sergei Kurashov, 9th Minister of Health of the Soviet Union (b. 1910)
  - Alexander Todorsky, general and komkor (b. 1894)
- September 22 — Grigory Nikulin, Bolshevik revolutionary (b. 1895)
- October 14 — Saja Batyrow, 9th First Secretary of the Communist Party of Turkmenistan (b. 1908)
- November 1 — Seyid Shushinski, khananda folk singer (b. 1889)
- November 18 — Teymur Guliyev, 1st & 3rd Chairman of the Council of Ministers of the Azerbaijan Soviet Socialist Republic (b. 1888)
- November 23 — Oskar Sepre, Estonian communist politician (b. 1900)

== See also ==
- 1965 in fine arts of the Soviet Union
- List of Soviet films of 1965
