= 1970 in the Soviet Union =

- Decades: 1950s; 1960s; 1970s; 1980s; 1990s
- See also: History of the Soviet Union; List of years in the Soviet Union

The following lists events that happened during 1970 in the Union of Soviet Socialist Republics.

== Incumbents ==
- General Secretary of the Communist Party of the Soviet Union: Leonid Brezhnev
- Premier of the Soviet Union: Alexei Kosygin
- Chairman of the Russian SFSR: Mikhail Yasnov

== Events ==
- May 24 – The scientific drilling of the Kola Superdeep Borehole begins.
- June 1 – The two-man spacecraft Soyuz 9 is launched.
- June 15 – Operation Wedding: Fifteen refuseniks try to escape from the Soviet Union by hijacking a plane.
- October 6 – French President Georges Pompidou visits the Soviet Union.
- October 8 – Soviet author Aleksandr Solzhenitsyn is awarded the Nobel Prize in Literature.
- October 15 – The domestic Soviet Aeroflot Flight 244 is hijacked and diverted to Turkey.
- October 20 – The Zond 8 lunar probe is launched.
- November 9 – Luna 17 is launched.
- November 12 – Soviet author Andrei Amalrik is sentenced to three years imprisonment for 'anti-Soviet' writings.

== Births ==
- January 2 – Oksana Omelianchik, artistic gymnast
- January 17 – Genndy Tartakovsky, Russian-born American animator
- March 16 – Oleg Pavlov, writer (died 2018)
- June 11 – Dmitry Utkin, army officer (died 2023)
- July 3 – Serhiy Honchar, Ukrainian racing cyclist
- July 13 – Igor Kirillov, army general and war criminal (died 2024)
- August 26 – Olimpiada Ivanova, race walker

== Deaths ==
- January 10 — Pavel Belyayev, Soviet cosmonaut (b. 1925)
- January 31 — Mikhail Mil, helicopter manufacturer (b. 1909)
- March 31 — Semyon Timoshenko, 2nd People's Commissar for Defence (b. 1895)
- April 1 — Polina Zhemchuzhina, politician and wife of former foreign minister Vyacheslav Molotov (b. 1897)
- April 17 — Patriarch Alexy I of Moscow, 13th Patriarch of Moscow and all Rus' (b. 1877)
- June 11 — Alexander Kerensky, revolutionary, lawyer and politician (b. 1881)
- June 21 — Lev Kassil, writer (b. 1905)
- July 19 — Banat Batyrova, farmer (b. 1904)
- August 22 — Vladimir Propp, folklorist and scholar (b. 1895)
- September 9 — Konon Molody, intelligence officer (b. 1922)
- November 17 — Nikolai Lunin, admiral in the Soviet Navy (b. 1907)
- November 19
  - Andrei Yeremenko, military leader and Marshal of the Soviet Union (b. 1892)
  - Maria Yudina, pianist (b. 1899)
- December 8 — Abram Alikhanov, experimental physicist (b. 1904)
- December 24 — Nikolai Shvernik, 2nd Chairman of the Presidium of the Supreme Soviet of the Soviet Union (b. 1888)

== See also ==
- 1970 in fine arts of the Soviet Union
- List of Soviet films of 1971
