= 1945 in fine arts of the Soviet Union =

The year 1945 was marked by many events that left an imprint on the history of Soviet and Russian Fine Arts.

== Events ==
- February 23 — Exhibition of works by artists of Battle Art Studio after Mitrofan Grekov was opened in Moscow in the Central House of Red Army. The exposition includes over 500 works of painting, sculpture, drawing by 44 authors.

== Deaths ==
- March 31 — Leonard Turzhansky (Russian: Туржанский Леонард Викторович), Russian painter (b. 1875).
- May 24 — Konstantin Gorbatov (Russian: Горбатов Константин Иванович), Russian painter (b. 1876).
- May 31 — Leonid Pasternak (Russian: Леонид Осипович Пастернак or Isaak Iosifovich Pasternak), Russian painter of Orthodox Jewish origin (b. 1862). He was the father of the poet and novelist Boris Pasternak.
- July 18 — Anatoli Kaygorodov (Russian: Кайгородов Анатолий Дмитриевич), Russian painter and graphic artist (b. 1878).
- November 12 — Vsevolod Voinov (Russian: Воинов Всеволод Владимирович), Russian painter, graphic artist, theatre artist and art historian (b. 1880).
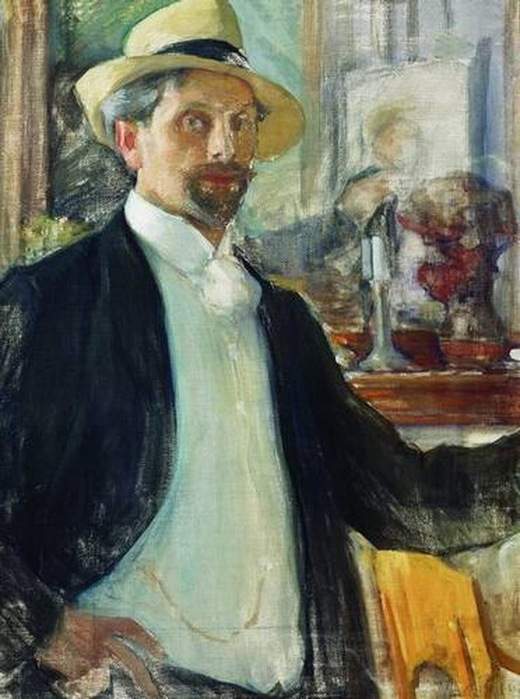
Leonid Pasternak - self-portrait

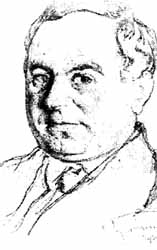
Konstantin Gorbatov

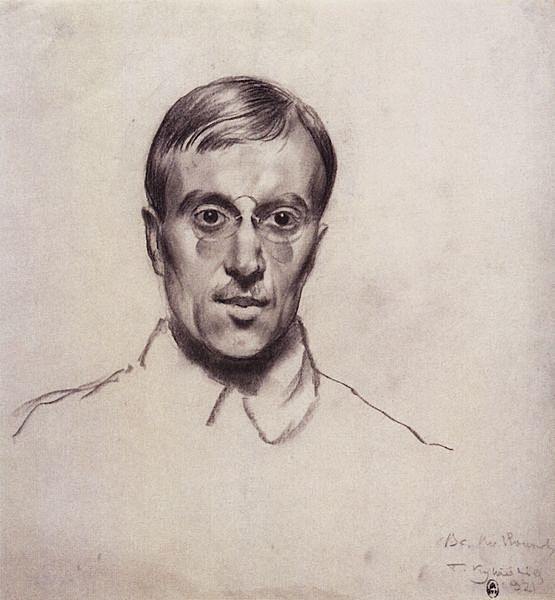
Vsevolod Voinov

== See also ==
- List of Russian artists
- List of painters of Leningrad Union of Artists
- Saint Petersburg Union of Artists
- Russian culture
- 1945 in the Soviet Union

== Sources ==
- Каталог выставки. Живопись. Скульптура. Графика. М., ЦДКА, 1945.
- Выставка этюдов ленинградских художников (Живопись, скульптура, графика, театр). Л., ЛССХ, 1945.
- Третья выставка работ художников ленинградского фронта. Каталог. Л., Военное издательство Народного Комиссариата обороны, 1945.
- Выставки советского изобразительного искусства. Справочник. Том 3. 1941—1947 годы. М., Советский художник, 1973.
- Artists of Peoples of the USSR. Biography Dictionary. Vol. 1. Moscow, Iskusstvo, 1970.
- Artists of Peoples of the USSR. Biography Dictionary. Vol. 2. Moscow, Iskusstvo, 1972.
- Directory of Members of Union of Artists of USSR. Volume 1,2. Moscow, Soviet Artist Edition, 1979.
- Directory of Members of the Leningrad branch of the Union of Artists of Russian Federation. Leningrad, Khudozhnik RSFSR, 1980.
- Artists of Peoples of the USSR. Biography Dictionary. Vol. 4 Book 1. Moscow, Iskusstvo, 1983.
- Directory of Members of the Leningrad branch of the Union of Artists of Russian Federation. – Leningrad: Khudozhnik RSFSR, 1987.
- Персональные и групповые выставки советских художников. 1917-1947 гг. М., Советский художник, 1989.
- Artists of peoples of the USSR. Biography Dictionary. Vol. 4 Book 2. – Saint Petersburg: Academic project humanitarian agency, 1995.
- Link of Times: 1932 – 1997. Artists – Members of Saint Petersburg Union of Artists of Russia. Exhibition catalogue. – Saint Petersburg: Manezh Central Exhibition Hall, 1997.
- Matthew C. Bown. Dictionary of 20th Century Russian and Soviet Painters 1900-1980s. – London: Izomar, 1998.
- Vern G. Swanson. Soviet Impressionism. – Woodbridge, England: Antique Collectors' Club, 2001.
- Петр Фомин. Живопись. Воспоминания современников. СПб., 2002. С.107.
- Время перемен. Искусство 1960—1985 в Советском Союзе. СПб., Государственный Русский музей, 2006.
- Sergei V. Ivanov. Unknown Socialist Realism. The Leningrad School. – Saint-Petersburg: NP-Print Edition, 2007. – ISBN 5-901724-21-6, ISBN 978-5-901724-21-7.
- Anniversary Directory graduates of Saint Petersburg State Academic Institute of Painting, Sculpture, and Architecture named after Ilya Repin, Russian Academy of Arts. 1915 – 2005. – Saint Petersburg: Pervotsvet Publishing House, 2007.
