= 1942 in the Soviet Union =

- Decades: 1920s; 1930s; 1940s; 1950s; 1960s
- See also: History of the Soviet Union; List of years in the Soviet Union

The following lists events that happened during 1942 in the Union of Soviet Socialist Republics.

== Incumbents ==
- General Secretary of the Communist Party of the Soviet Union – Joseph Stalin
- Chairman of the Presidium of the Supreme Soviet of the Soviet Union – Mikhail Kalinin
- Chairman of the Council of People's Commissars of the Soviet Union – Joseph Stalin

== Births ==
- January 1
  - Gennady Sarafanov, Soviet and Russian cosmonaut (d. 2005)
  - Sergey Shakurov, Soviet and Russian actor
  - Yuri Vladimirov, Soviet ballet dancer (d. 2025)
- January 5 — Giorgi Arsenishvili, 3rd State Minister of Georgia (d. 2010)
- January 7
  - Svetlana Savyolova, Soviet and Russian film and stage actress (d. 1999)
  - Vasily Alekseyev, weightlifter (d. 2011)
- January 24 — Valery Obodzinsky, Soviet and Russian tenor (d. 1997)
- February 3 — Yevgeny Shaposhnikov, 8th Minister of Defence of the Soviet Union (d. 2020)
- February 10 — Anatolijs Gorbunovs, Chairman of the Supreme Council of Latvia
- March 11 — Aslambek Aslakhanov, Deputy of the State Duma (d. 2024)
- April 11 — Anatoly Berezovoy, Soviet and Russian cosmonaut (d. 2014)
- April 14
  - Valeriy Brumel, Soviet and Russian high jumper (d. 2003)
  - Valentin Lebedev, Soviet and Russian cosmonaut
- April 27 — Valeri Polyakov, Soviet and Russian cosmonaut (d. 2022)
- April 29 — Galina Kulakova, Soviet and Russian cross-country skier
- May 13 — Vladimir Dzhanibekov, Soviet and Russian cosmonaut
- May 25 — Alexander Kalyagin, Soviet and Russian actor and director
- June 2 — Eduard Malofeyev, Soviet and Belarusian footballer and coach
- July 10 — Pyotr Klimuk, Soviet and Belarusian cosmonaut
- July 16 — Victor Kalashnikov, Russian small arms designer (d. 2018)
- July 28 — Valdis Birkavs, 11th Prime Minister of Latvia
- August 17 — Muslim Magomayev, Soviet, Azerbaijani and Russian opera and pop singer (d. 2008)
- August 25 — Margarita Terekhova, Soviet and Russian theater and film actress
- October 8 — Ismat Gayibov, 1st Prosecutor General of Azerbaijan (d. 1991)
- October 11 — Anatoly Tyazhlov, 1st Governor of Moscow Oblast (d. 2008)
- October 15 — Tursunbek Chyngyshev, 2nd Prime Minister of Kyrgyzstan
- October 26 — Vladimir Yermoshin, 4th Prime Minister of Belarus
- October 30 — Eduard Vinokurov, Soviet and Russian Olympic sabre fencer (d. 2010)
- November 21 — Liudmyla Sheremet, Ukrainian anesthesiologist (d. 2014)
- November 22 — Ruslan Khasbulatov, Chairman of the Supreme Soviet of the Russian Federation (d. 2023)
- December 30 — Vladimir Bukovsky, Soviet and Russian human rights activist and writer (d. 2019)

== Deaths ==
- 14 February – Matvey Kuzmin
- 14 August – Sabina Spielrein

== See also ==
- 1942 in fine arts of the Soviet Union
- List of Soviet films of 1942
