= Georgi Vyun =

Soviet footballer and Russian coach

Personal information
- Full name: Georgi Ivanovich Vyun
- Date of birth: 27 October 1944
- Place of birth: Solntsevka, Omsk Oblast, USSR
- Date of death: 29 November 2008 (aged 64)
- Place of death: Saint Petersburg, Russia
- Position: Midfielder

Senior career*
Years	Team	Apps	(Gls)
1965	FC Tsement Novorossiysk		
1966–1967	FC Ararat Yerevan	61	(6)
1968–1975	FC Zenit Leningrad	169	(17)

International career
1968	USSR	1	(1)

Managerial career
- 1995–1996: FC Zenit St. Petersburg (assistant)
- 2001: PFC CSKA Moscow (assistant)
- * Club domestic league appearances and goals

Georgi Ivanovich Vyun (Russian: Георгий Иванович Вьюн) (born 27 October 1944 in Solntsevka, Omsk Oblast died 29 November 2008 in Saint Petersburg) was a Soviet football player and a Russian coach.

== International career ==
Vyun played his only game for USSR on 16 June 1968 in a friendly against Austria and scored a goal in that game.
