= 1927 in the Soviet Union =

- Decades: 1920s; 1930s; 1940s
- See also: History of the Soviet Union; List of years in the Soviet Union

The following lists events that happened during 1927 in the Union of Soviet Socialist Republics.

== Incumbents ==
- General Secretary of the Communist Party of the Soviet Union – Joseph Stalin
- Chairman of the Central Executive Committee of the Congress of Soviets – Mikhail Kalinin
- Chairman of the Council of People's Commissars of the Soviet Union – Alexei Rykov

== Events ==
=== February ===
- 25 February – Article 58 (RSFSR Penal Code) is put into force.

=== May ===
- 12 May – During the Arcos Affair, British police officers raid the headquarters of ARCOS in London.

=== December ===
- 2–19 December – 15th Congress of the All-Union Communist Party (Bolsheviks)

== Births ==
- 14 January – Ivan Kalita, Olympic equestrian
- 16 March – Vladimir Komarov, test pilot and cosmonaut
- 23 March – Aleksandr Tarasov, Soviet Olympic modern pentathlete
- 31 March – Vladimir Ilyushin, test pilot
- 10 April – Alexey Ekimyan, Armenian-Russian composer
- 20 April – Mirian Tsalkalamanidze, Olympic wrestler
- 15 May – Leila Mardanshina, oil and gas operator (died 2017)
- 16 May – Boris Tokarev, Olympic athlete
- 28 May – Aleksandr Moiseyev, Olympic basketball player
- 3 June – Evgeny Chuprun, painter
- 12 June – Timir Pinegin, Olympic sailor (died 2013)
- 23 June
  - Leonid Bogdanov, Soviet Olympic fencer
  - Galina Rumiantseva, painter
- 26 June – Ben Turok, Belarus-born South African anti-apartheid activist, professor and politician (d. 2019)
- 28 June – Boris Shilkov, Olympic speed skater
- 23 July – Dmitry Buchkin, Soviet painter
- 22 August – Aleksandr Tenyagin, football player and manager (died 2008)
- 24 August – Levko Lukyanenko, Ukrainian politician (died 2018)
- 15 September – Boris Gostev, Soviet Minister of Finance
- 1 October – Oleg Yefremov, actor
- 27 October – Mikhail Postnikov, mathematician
- 28 October – Roza Makagonova, actress (died 1995)
- 7 November – Piotr Litvinsky, painter
- 12 November – Pavel Kharin, Olympic canoeist
- 16 November – Inna Solovyova theatre and film critic (died 2024)
- 6 December – Vladimir Naumov, film director
- 8 December – Vladimir Shatalov, Soyuz cosmonaut
- 14 December – Nikolay Tatarinov, Olympic modern pentathlete

== Deaths ==
- 18 May – Nikifor Begichev, Soviet seaman and explorer (born 1874)
- 16 June – Károly Vántus, Hungarian Communist Party politician (born 1879)
- 16 November – Adolph Joffe, diplomat, committed suicide (born 1883)
- 14 December – Julian Sochocki, Russian-Polish mathematician (born 1842)

== See also ==
- 1927 in fine arts of the Soviet Union
- List of Soviet films of 1927
