= Valerijonas Šadreika =

Lithuanian politician (1938–1991)

Valerijonas Šadreika (20 June 1938 – 29 June 1991) was a Lithuanian politician. In 1990 he was among those who signed the Act of the Re-Establishment of the State of Lithuania.
