= 1955 Estonian Supreme Soviet election =

1955 elections in Estonian SSR

Elections to the Supreme Soviet of the Estonian SSR were held on 27 February 1955. As was the case with the two previous elections of the Estonian SSR, the Bloc of Communists and Non-Party Candidates was the only party permitted to contest the elections, and won all 125 seats.

== Results ==
Party	Votes	%	Seats
Bloc of Communists and Non-Party Candidates	875,069	99.83	125
Against	1,494	0.17	–
Total	876,563	100.00	125
Valid votes	876,563	99.99	
Invalid/blank votes	57	0.01	
Total votes	876,620	100.00	
Registered voters/turnout	876,620	100.00	
Source: Liivik Pravda

== See also ==
- List of members of the Supreme Soviet of the Estonian Soviet Socialist Republic, 1955–1959
