= Marina Yakhlakova =

Russian pianist

Marina Yakhlakova (Russian: Марина Владимировна Яхлакова; born 20 July 1991) is a prizewinning Russian classical pianist. She began learning to play aged 5. After four years of private coaching with Vitaly Mishchenko she continued her professional education at the Gnessin State Musical College for gifted children and later at the Moscow Conservatory. She also completed a post-graduate course at the Barenboim-Said Akademie in Berlin. In 2011, Yakhlakova became the third person in her direct teaching line to win a competition dedicated to the namesake of Franz Liszt, after her teacher Alexander Strukov (in 1991) and his teacher, Lev Vlassenko (in 1956). In June 2015, Yakhlakova made it to the first round of the XV International Tchaikovsky Competition but was subsequently eliminated.

She is one of the only two young musicians who has been chosen by Care for Talent Foundation, a non-profit organization that accompanies, protects and guides young musical talents on their way to national and international top stages to join their artist-program.

== Awards, prizes, certificates ==
- 2019: the Artist Diploma's certificate – Barenboim-Said Akademie
- 2014: Red Certificate – Moscow Conservatory
- 2011: 1st Prize and Special award for the best interpretation of a composition by Franz Liszt – International Franz Liszt Piano Competition Weimar-Bayreuth
- 2010: Marina Bondarenko Memorial Award – Tel-Hai, Israel
- 2008: Laureate – Sixth Festival of Romantic Music for Young Moscow Musicians

== Recordings ==
Yakhlakova has made two recordings for the Master Performers label. The first CD Album to be released was recorded on a Mason & Hamlin Concert Grand in Australia featuring Mussorgsky's Pictures at an Exhibition and Tchaikovsky/Pletnev's Nutcracker Suite. Yakhlakova followed this with a DVD filmed at Mechanics Hall in Worcester Massachusetts in the United States featuring the works of Schubert and Schubert-Liszt.

== Performances ==
As a direct and indirect result of winning the International Franz Liszt Piano Competition, Yakhlakova received prestigious recital and concerto performances in Austria, Australia, France, Germany, Israel, Lithuania, the Netherlands, Norway, Russia, Sweden, Spain and Canada. In April 2014, Yakhlakova undertook her third tour of Australia starting with two performances of Saint-Saëns's Piano Concerto No. 2 with the Queensland Symphony Orchestra under Greek conductor Vassilis Christopoulos.

In December 2018, she took part in the concert To the Memory of Lev Vlassenko, performing Rachmaninoff's Rhapsody on a Theme of Paganini with the Russian National Orchestra under Mikhail Pletnev as a conductor. Her interpretation was met with enthusiastic support by both the audience and orchestra players. The musicians of the orchestra considered Yakhlakova as the best concert soloist of that night's performance despite the fact that among other performers, there was Lucas Debargue.

In September 2019, Yakhlakova made her opening night performing of Prokofiev's Piano Concerto No.2 with the Governor's Symphonic Orchestra of the Irkutsk Regional Philharmonic Society under Ilmars Harijs Lapinsch within the framework of Stars on Baikal Festival. Right after the first rehearsal a Philharmonic staff member came up to Marina Yakhlakova saying with great surprise that he had never used to listen to such interpretation before. Her performance at the very concert drew a standing ovation from the audience. "Hats off to you!" that was the conductor’s reaction on her playing. She was called to play twice on encore as a result.

Two months later, in November 2019, there was the next personal premier playing. This time it was Beethoven’' Piano Concerto No.5 performed in collaboration with the MDR Leipzig Radio Symphony Orchestra conducted by Jan Willem de Vriend. Again, there was endorsement of the orchestra and the conductor from the very first rehearsal and two encores after the performance itself.

== Reviews ==
Despite Yakhlakova's bad luck in the XV International Tchaikovsky Competition, Denis Matsuev praised her as "a phenomenally gifted" person.

In the September 2014 issue of Fine Music Magazine, Richard Wenn is quoted as saying: "What we find in Marina is a complete artistic talent. Behind her seemingly delicate and childlike persona lurks a demonic pianist of the utmost stamina and technical facility, yet somehow she is able to couple this with the most tender lyricism."

In October 2012, Christel Laude of Nordhausen wrote, "Of particular interest for the audience was the Tchaikovsky Concerto No.1 performed by 21-year-old Marina Yakhlakova, a pianist with a special affinity for the work and composer, the ravishing performance ended with spontaneous cheers and enthusiastic applause ... Petite in stature, but powerful and strong in her playing, she held the audience from the first few majestic chords and had them in her spell, a performance of breathtaking technical brilliance and sensitive structure ... Whether in her solo playing or in the dialogue with orchestra there was always sumptuous playing, almost bubbling out from under her fingers. ... A highly focussed musician with immense joy in her playing she provided the audience with an unforgettable concert experience. Yakhlakova is an artist to admired for her skilful playing and respect for composer, she is destined for a great career."

In a video made by the International Franz Liszt Piano Competition, renowned French-Canadian pianist Louis Lortie said, "There is something very mysterious about her; she has a very deep soul... It is a bit like the feeling I get when I hear Gergiev playing with the orchestra; this incredible magma of sound."
