= Marat Minibayev =

Russian footballer

Personal information
- Full name: Marat Mikhailovich Minibayev
- Date of birth: 15 August 1966 (age 60)
- Height: 1.78 m (5 ft 10 in)
- Position: Defender

Youth career
- SDYuShOR-3 Chelyabinsk

Senior career*
Years	Team	Apps	(Gls)
1983	FC Lokomotiv Chelyabinsk	6	(0)
1984–1989	FC SKA Rostov-on-Don	148	(4)
1990	SFC Drohobych	39	(1)
1991–1992	FC APK Azov	47	(0)
1992–1993	FC Dynamo Stavropol	21	(1)
1993–1994	FC Rostselmash Rostov-on-Don	28	(0)
1995	FC Arsenal Tula	37	(1)
1996–1997	FC Inter Rostov-on-Don		
1997	FC Diana Elizabetovka		
1998	FC Fortuna Rostov-on-Don		
1999	FC Maksima Rostov-on-Don		

Managerial career
- 2008: FC SKA Rostov-on-Don (reserves assistant)
- 2009–2010: FC Bataysk-2007 (VP security)
- * Club domestic league appearances and goals

Marat Mikhailovich Minibayev (Russian: Марат Михайлович Минибаев; born 15 August 1966) is a former Russian professional footballer.

== Club career ==
He made his professional debut in the Soviet Second League in 1983 for FC Lokomotiv Chelyabinsk.
