= Tahmasib Ajdarov =

Azerbaijani and Ukrainian scientist

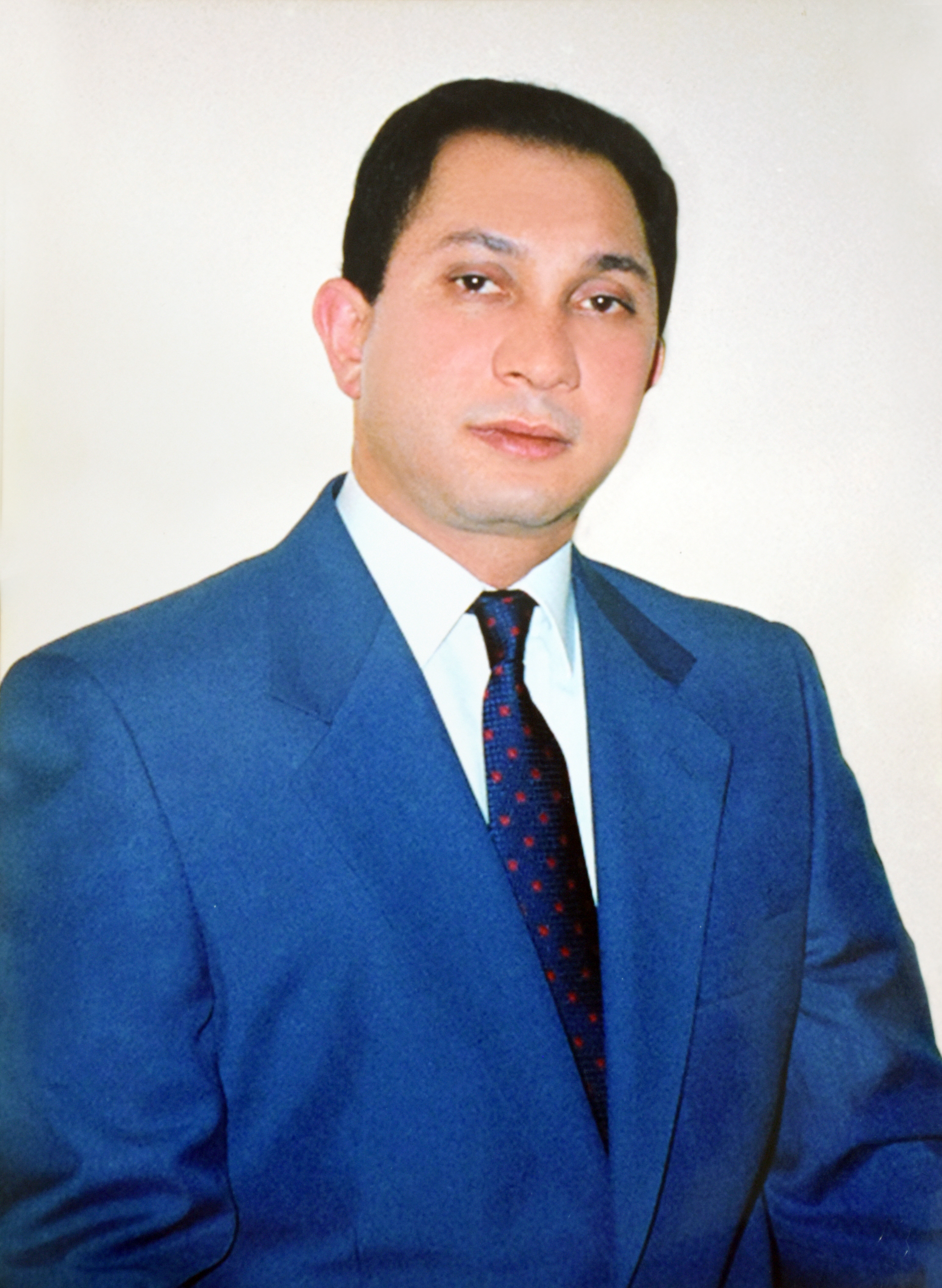
- Ajdarov in 2002
- Born: April 17, 1964 (age 62); Baku, Azerbaijan SSR
- Education: Azerbaijan National Economic Institute; Baku State University

Tahmasib Hossein Ajdarov (Azerbaijani: Əjdərov Təhmasib Hüseyn oğlu; born April 17, 1964) is an Azerbaijani and Ukrainian scientist, economist and lawyer. During his service term, 1st Class Senior State Tax Service Advisor – Tax Service General; Master of Sambo-Wrestling and Race Sports.

== Career ==
After the separation of the tax service from the Ministry of Finance in Azerbaijan, he served as the Head of the Legal Department at the General State Tax Inspection. After some time, he appointed to the position of the Deputy Head of the General State Tax Inspectorate under the Executive Order of the President of Azerbaijan, and later rose to the rank of the 1st Class Senior State Tax Service Advisor (Tax Service General).

He completed international retraining courses in tax in France, Germany, Austria and Turkey and obtained relevant certificates from those countries.

=== Scientific Activity in Azerbaijan ===
In 1997, he was accepted as a doctoral student to the Institute of Economics of Azerbaijan National Academy of Sciences. His monography titled Issues of Formation and Improvement of Tax Mechanism was published by Elm Publishing House in 1997.

==== His Role in the Establishment of the Tax Service System in Azerbaijan ====
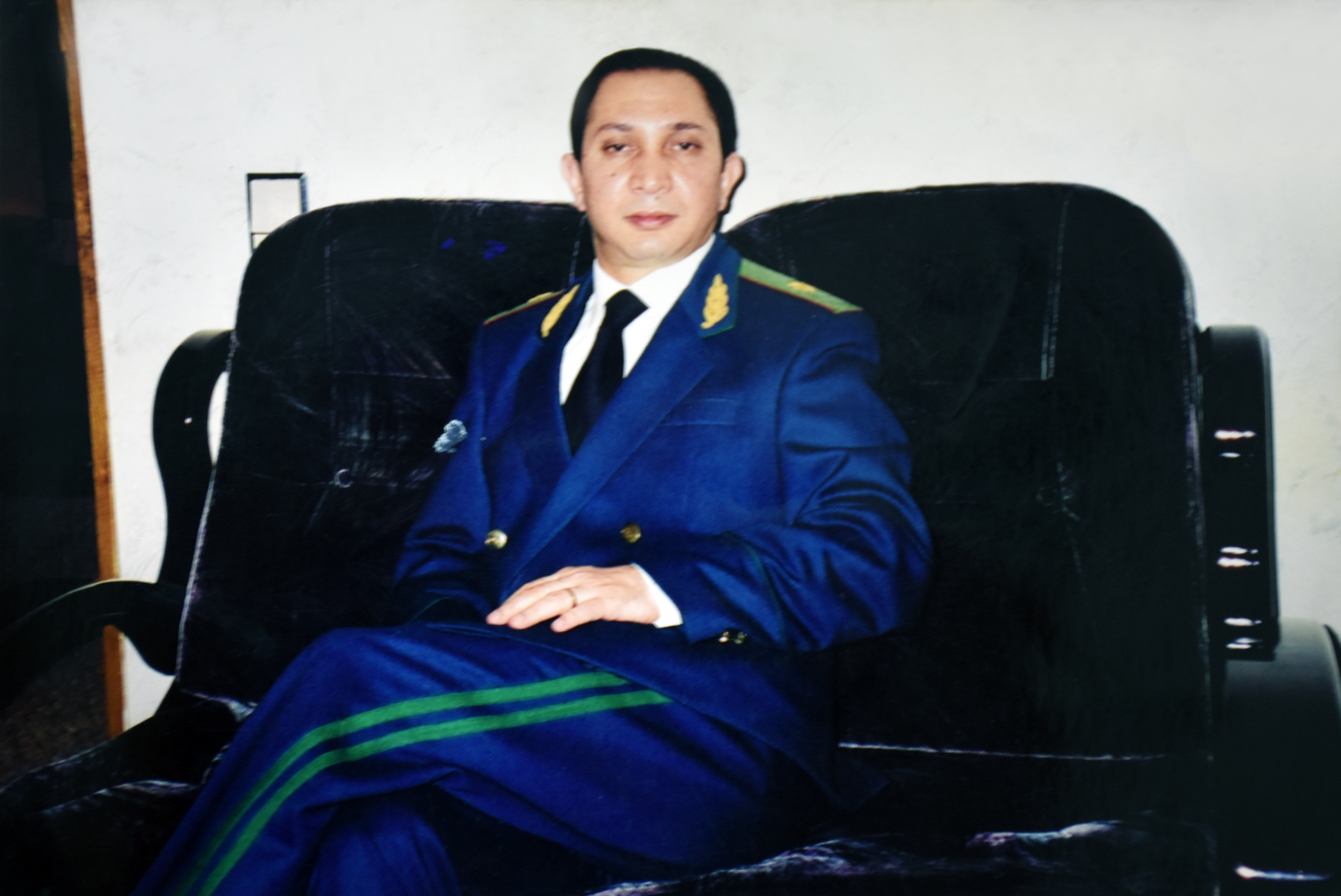

In Ajdarov's monography titled Issues of Formation and Improvement of the Tax Mechanism, the scientific-theoretical bases for the formation of the tax system which is necessary for the young Azerbaijan government were presented.

He has paid a special attention to the study of international practice in his scientific research. Studying the tax systems of US, Canada, Great Britain, France, Japan and Denmark, the economist scientist drafted the bases for the tax system of our country by taking into account the practices of these countries and Azerbaijan's national characteristics.

Ajdarov has studied the development stages of the tax system of Azerbaijan and has got very important practical findings.

Ajdarov's monography titled Formation and Improvement of the Tax Mechanism was published in Russian by the Publishing House of Russia State Civil Service Academy with the recommendation of Academician Azad Mirzajanzadeh in 1997. In the following years, Ajdarov's more 5 monographies about economic and legal issues were published. Ajdarov's monographies and books can be found in Azerbaijan at Azerbaijan National Library named after Mirza Fatali Akhundzadeh, Central City Library (current Presidential Library) and Scientific-Technical Library. Ajdarov regularly gave speeches with his thesis statements at scientific-practical conferences dedicated to various issues, held in the country.

The scientist's doctoral dissertation titled Issues of Formation and Improvement of the Tax Mechanism in the Republic of Azerbaijan was discussed at the joint meeting held on September 28, 2001, by 4 sub-departments of Azerbaijan State University of Economics. Reputable scientists attending the meeting issued high opinions about the doctoral dissertation of Ajdarov.

=== Scientific Activity in Ukraine ===
As the Specialized Scientific Council of Finance-Cash Circulation & Loans was not in Azerbaijan, Tahmasib Ajdarov continued his scientific activity in Ukraine since 2000 with a reference letter. Continuing on his scientific activity in Ukraine, Ajdarov also became familiar with the scientific environment of that country in a short time and demonstrated that he was a specialist and scientist with high theoretical and practical preparedness in the sphere of taxes. He accomplished building close professional relations with his Ukrainian colleagues. Ajdarov's scientific works, monographies and books can be found at the Scientific Library of Dnipropetrovsk State University, Kharkiv State Scientific Library named after V.G. Korolenko, Odesa State Library named after M. Gorki, Ukraininan National Parliament Library and Ukrainian Book Chamber.

Ajdarov's monography book titled Development of Economy & Tax Policy, published in Kyiv in 2003 was interesting for Ukrainian scientists. During his operation in Ukraine, Ajdarov also actively collaborated with the Economist Magazine published in that country and published his articles and interpretations on its pages.

According to Decree Dated 2002 of the Supreme Attestation Commission of Ukraine, Tahmasib Hossein Ajdarov was awarded with the academic degree of Doctor of Economics.

The findings of scientific research of Tahmasib Ajdarov were widely used by finance and tax authorities of the CIS countries.

== Social-Political Activity ==
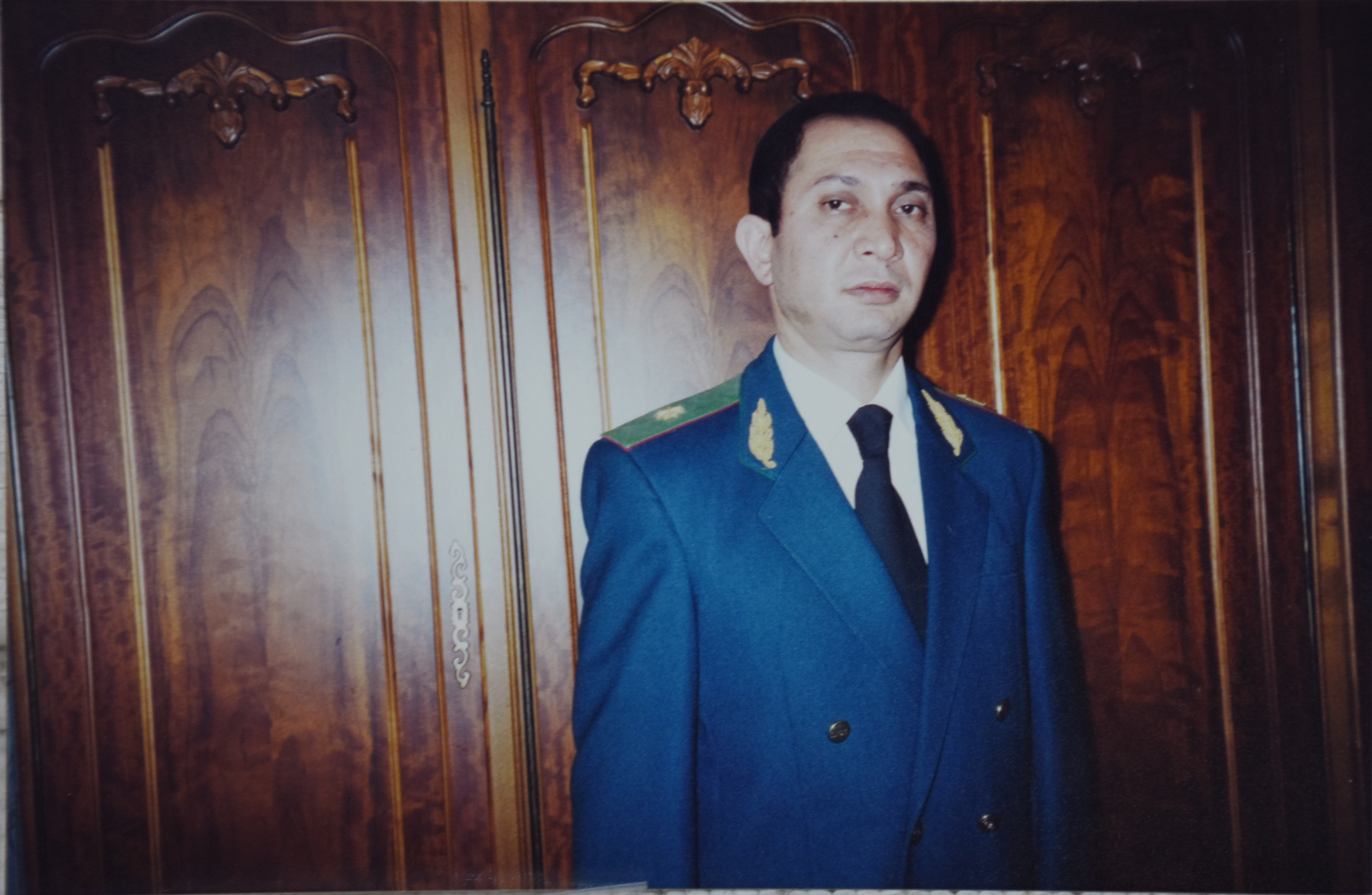

When studying at the secondary school, he participated in Republic-Wide Olympiads of various subjects and was rewarded with honor certificates. For his participation in social works, he was rewarded with an honor certificate by the Regional Committee of the Association of Azerbaijani Leninist Communist Youth. He graduated from the secondary school with an honorary diploma.

When doing his military service, Ajdarov was rewarded with the badge of Forward Soldier. For his demonstrative service, letters of thanks were sent to his parents many times. He was sent to the Military Party School under the Political Department of Zabaikalye Military Division to study. When studying there, he was accepted into the Communist Party of the Soviet Union. He graduated from the Military Party School.

When studying at the Law Department of Baku State University, Ajdarov served as the Head of the Student Scientific Society and participated in scientific conferences held. He made himself known at most of the events held at the University. When working at Narimanov District Committee of the Association of Leninist Communist Youth, he conducted educational-organizational activities among the youth.

When working at the Production Union of the Ministry of Housing & Utilities, Tahmasib Ajdarov was the head of the national supervision group and ensured the collection of funds remained as debts at various institutions to the budget. When serving at the Ministry of Finance, Tahmasib Ajdarov restructured the legal works of that Ministry according to the modern standards. He drafted the Regulations on the Arrangement of the Legal Work of the Ministry of Finance, and the Regulations were approved by the Ministry of Justice. After the separation of the tax service from the Ministry of Finance in Azerbaijan, Ajdarov served as the Head of the Legal Department of the General State Tax Inspectorate. When acting as the head of the Legal Department, he supervised the control team consisting of 100 persons to conduct a comprehensive control in Khatai District of Baku City. As a result of the control, funds in the number of millions of Manats hidden from the state budget were detected and the receipt of those funds to the state budget was ensured. At that period, Tahmasib Ajdarov directly participated in the drafting of many laws and normative acts as well as instructions on the tax legislation of the Republic of Azerbaijan, and bilateral agreements in the sphere of taxes, which Azerbaijan concluded with foreign countries.

Tahmasib Ajdarov was promoted to the position of the Deputy Head of the Senior State Tax Inspector under the relevant Executive Order of the President of the country. When serving in that position, he regularly published his articles titled Tax Policy is a Civil Culture, Virus of Illicit, Inflation Cancer, Inertness of Bureaucracy, Serving to Economic Security is Our Civil Duty, Interest of Voters, European Games – Interest of Nation, etc. articles in the Press of the country.

He contributed to the organization of the Azerbaijani diaspora in different countries, and kept relations with Azerbaijanis in various countries. When being on foreign visits, Ajdarov used to meet with members of his nation and felt him responsible for getting familiar with their successes and problems. And as a result of these relations, Ajdarov was elected a representative to the general assembly of the Congress of World Azerbaijanis in 2004 and actively participated in that reputable forum.

The diplomatic representations of the foreign countries operating in Azerbaijan also officially invited Doctor of Economics Ajdarov to various events they held.

== Personal life ==
Ajdarov was born on April 17, 1964 in Baku. He graduated from the Military Party School of the Azerbaijan State University of Economics, as well as the Baku State University. Then, he studied at the Civil Service Academy under the President of the Russian Federation. Ajdarov was a post-graduate student of the Institute of Economics of Azerbaijan National Academy of Sciences in 1992 and completed that postgraduate education in 1996. Ajdarov was rewarded with the PhD degree in Economics under the Supreme Attestation Commission of Azerbaijan. He was the first researcher-scientist studying the issues of the formation and improvement of the tax mechanism in Azerbaijan. Ajdarov was also awarded with the degree of Doctor of Economics under the Decree Dated 2002 of the Supreme Attestation Commission of Ukraine.

Ajdarov's father, Professor Hossein Gadim Ajdarov, is a Scientist-Economist and his uncle Mehdi Gadim Gourbanov, is an Associate Professor with a PhD in Medicine and also UNESCO's Honorary Professor.

== Scientific works ==
Ajdarov's scientific works were published in Azerbaijan, Russia, Ukraine, Belarus, Kazakhstan, Uzbekistan, Iran and Turkey. He is the author of 15 scientific monographies, 10 brochures, about 100 scientific articles, and a range of instructions, programs and draft laws.

1. Development of Free Entrepreneurship & Tax Policy in the Transition to the Market Economy. Baku 1995
2. Ways of Elimination of Economic Crisis in the Transition to the Market Economy. Baku 1996
3. Techniques for Increasing of Tax Incomes. Moscow 2006. (in Russian)
4. Tax & Development of Entrepreneurship. Ukraine. 2007. (in Russian)
5. Impact of the Tax Policy on Budget Incomes. Ukraine 2008. (in Russian)
6. Tax Policy. Belarus, 2009. (in Russian)
7. Stabilization of Tax Incomes. Uzbekistan 2010. (in Russian)

=== Monography ===
1. Issues of Formation & Improvement of Tax Mechanism / T. H. Ajdarov; Editor T.A. Pashayev; The Institute of Economy of the Academy of Sciences of Azerbaijan. - Baku: Elm, 1997. - 118 p. - 500 cop. - ISBN 5-8066-0754-2
2. The Directions of the Tax Issue & the Work of Tax Service Authorities in Azerbaijan / T. H. Ajdarov. - Tabriz: Akhtar, 2001. - 184 p. – In Persian. - 100 cop. - ISBN 964-6756-73-5
3. Formation & Improvement of Tax Mechanism: Monography, T. Ajdarov, Reviewers: G.G. Jafarov, A.A. Abdullayev, Moscow 1997, RAGS, 11 p. 300 cop. BBK 65 А 11.
4. Taxation and Tax Policy Issues in Azerbaijan. Baku, ‘Sabah’, 2001. 154 p.[4] ISBN 5-86106-221-8
5. Tax Issue in the Development of Azerbaijan's Economy & Aspects of Its Study / T. H. Ajdarov; Scientific Editor A. S. Shakaraliyev - Baku: Elm, 2001. - 534 p.: Table. - 1000 cop. - ISBN 5-8066-1349-6
6. Tax Issue in the Development of Azerbaijan's Economy & Aspects of Its Study: Monography / Tahmasib Hossein Ajdarov. – Baku: [B.i.], 2001. – 534 pages. 1000 copies – In Ukrainian. ISBN 5-8066-1349-6
