= Valentina Legkostupova =

Soviet and Russian pop singer (1965–2020)

Valentina Legkostupova HAR

Background information
- Born: Valentina Valeryevna Legkostupova; 30 December 1965; Khabarovsk, Khabarovsk Krai, RSFSR, USSR
- Died: 14 August 2020 (aged 54) Moscow, Russia
- Genres: Pop, chanson, ballad
- Occupations: Singer
- Years active: 1985—2020
- Website: legkostupova.com

Valentina Valeryevna Legkostupova (Russian: Валенти́на Вале́рьевна Легкосту́пова; 30 December 1965 – 14 August 2020) was a Soviet and Russian pop singer, teacher, producer, and Honored Artist of the Russian Federation (2001).

== Biography ==
Legkostupova was born on 30 December 1965 in Khabarovsk to Valery Vladimirovich Legkostupov and Galina Ivanovna Legkostupova.

The debut of the singer on the stage took place in 1985 in Kherson of the Ukrainian SSR a solo concert with a band led by Senya Son.

On 30 June 1986, Legkostupova received the second prize of the 1st All-Union Television Jurmala Young Pop Singer Competition, where she performed with the songs The Shore of Happiness (Vladimir Danilin, Senya Son — Ilya Reznik) and I Still Hope (Margarita Pushkina — Kris Kelmi).

She was married to Aleksey Grigoriev, the son of sound director Yuri Grigoriev. They have two children: a daughter called Anetta and a son, Matvey.

In 2014, Legkostupova moved to a permanent residence on the island of Tenerife. There, she was mostly engaged in real estate, but did not stop her concert and teaching activities. In August 2016, she launched her production centre VL Music.

In early 2018, she moved to Feodosia, where she headed the Feodosia's Department of Culture. She resigned in September 2018.
