= Oleg Tolmachev =

Soviet ice hockey player and coach

Oleg Vasliyevich Tolmachev
- Born: 19 August 1919; Novosibirsk, Russian SFSR
- Died: 1 January 2008 (aged 88); Moscow, Russia
- Position: Defenseman
- Played for: HC Dynamo Moscow
- Playing career: 1946–1956

Oleg Vasilyevich Tolmachev (Russian: Олег Васильевич Толмачёв) (19 August 1919 – 1 January 2008) was a Soviet ice hockey player and coach.

== Early life ==
Tolmachev was born in Novosibirsk (called Novonikolayevsk in 1919). He served in the Red Army from 1939 to 1946, and saw action in World War II during 1942–44. He was decorated twice, with the Order of the Patriotic War, II degree and medal "For the Victory over Germany in the Great Patriotic War 1941–1945".

== Hockey career ==
HC Dynamo Moscow - 1946–56 as player, 1957–62 as coach.
