= Morkovkin =

Morkovkin (Russian: Морковкин, feminine: Morkovkina, from morkovka meaning carrot) is a Russian surname. It may refer to

- Anastassia Morkovkina (born 1981), Estonian football striker
- Valentin Morkovkin (1933–1999), Russian rower
- Vasily Morkovkin, Belarusian military officer
