= Merab Katsitadze =

Georgian footballer

Personal information
- Date of birth: 25 February 1963 (age 63)
- Position: Defender

Senior career*
Years	Team	Apps	(Gls)
1984	Zoovetinstituti Tbilisi		
1988	Kolkheti Khobi		
1989	FC Guria Lanchkhuti	19	(0)
1990–1992	Kolkheti Khobi	76	(6)
1992–1996	FC Kakheti Telavi	81	(11)
1996	Maccabi Yavne F.C.		
1997	Metalurgi Rustavi	6	(0)
1997–1998	Kolkheti Khobi	30	(1)

International career
1994	Georgia	1	(0)
- * Club domestic league appearances and goals

Merab Katsitadze (born 25 February 1963) is a Georgian former professional footballer.
