= Yusif Aliyev =

- Born: December 2, 1969; Gobustan, Azerbaijan
- Died: September 21, 1991 (aged 21); Goranboy District, Azerbaijan
- Military career
- Allegiance: Republic of Azerbaijan
- Conflicts: First Nagorno-Karabakh War
- Awards: National Hero of Azerbaijan; 1992

Yusif Aliyev (Azerbaijani: Yusif Əliyev) (2 December 1969, Gobustan, Azerbaijan – 24 September 1991, Goranboy District, Azerbaijan) is a National Hero of Azerbaijan, and a hero of the First Nagorno-Karabakh War.

== Life ==
Yusif Aliyev was born on 2 December 1969, in the Gobustan settlement of Baku. He went to the Secondary School No. 223 in Gobustan, Azerbaijan. Aliyev was drafted to the Soviet Army in 1988 and completed his military service in the city of Sverdlovsk.

=== Personal life ===
He was married.

== Military career ==
Yusif Aliyev had his first battle in February 1991 in Goranboy District. Armed Armenian soldiers attacked the villages of Buzluk, Manashli and Erkach. Later on February 24, when Armenians attacked the village of Manashli, the soldiers of the Azerbaijani Army prevented their attacks. On September 14, 1991, when the Armenians attacked the village of Buzlu, Aliyev was killed by Armenians when he was on his way to deliver weapons and ammunition to the soldiers of Azerbaijani Army.

== Awards ==
Yusif Aliyev was posthumously awarded the title of "National Hero of Azerbaijan" by Presidential Decree No. 831 dated 6 June 1992. He was buried in the Rahimli village of Agsu District.

== Memorial ==
The Secondary School No. 195 in Gobustan is named after him.

== See also ==
- First Nagorno-Karabakh War

== Sources ==
- Vugar Asgarov. Azərbaycanın Milli Qəhrəmanları (Yenidən işlənmiş II nəşr). Bakı: "Dərələyəz-M", 2010, səh. 93–94.
