= Anna Loginova =

Russian model (1978–2008)

- Born: September 3, 1978; Vladimir, Russian SFSR
- Died: January 27, 2008 (aged 29); Moscow, Russia
- Cause of death: Head injuries sustained from carjacking
- Occupations: Fashion model, bodyguard

Anna Loginova (Russian: Анна Логинова; 3 September 1978 – 27 January 2008) was a Russian fashion model and later a trained bodyguard. She ran an agency, staffed with female bodyguards, some trained by the ex-KGB, to give discreet protection to Moscow's billionaires and their wives and mistresses. She was killed in a carjacking incident in Moscow. Loginova was described as Russia's most famous female bodyguard.

== Modeling and business career ==
Loginova was previously a model, working in advertising campaigns for Chanel and BMW. She also appeared almost naked in the December issue of the Russian version of Maxim.

She learned martial arts techniques and started a security firm, Stilet (literally dagger), specializing in female bodyguards in 2005. The use of female bodyguards includes escorting the protected person to a restaurant where male bodyguards would be more noticeable and are generally required to wait outside.

== Death ==
Loginova died from head injuries sustained while clinging to the door handle of her Porsche Cayenne while being dragged along the street at high speed as a carjacker drove the car away. She reportedly was pushed out of the vehicle and, for a moment, held on to the door handle before receiving her fatal head injuries. Police reported she died at the scene. She was 29 years old. The stolen vehicle was later abandoned in southwest Moscow. The carjacker has not been found. She left one child behind. She was buried in the Ulybyshevo cemetery in Vladimir.
