= 1906 in Russia =

- Decades: 1880s; 1890s; 1900s; 1910s; 1920s
- See also: History of Russia; Timeline of Russian history; List of years in Russia

Events from the year 1906 in Russia.

== Incumbents ==
- Monarch – Nicholas II
- Chairman of the Council of Ministers –
  - until 5 May – Sergei Witte
  - 5 May–21 July – Ivan Logginovich Goremykin
  - starting 21 July – Pyotr Arkadyevich Stolypin
  - Pyotr Stolypin, Russian prime minister from 1906 to 1911.

== Events ==
- Russian Constitution of 1906
- 1906 Russian legislative election
- Markovo Republic
- Białystok pogrom
- Bloody Wednesday (Poland)
- Siedlce pogrom
- Vyborg Manifesto

== Births ==
- 3 January – Ulyana Barkova, Russian farm worker (d. 1991)
- 21 January – Igor Moiseyev, Russian choreographer (d. 2007).
- 7 February – Oleg Antonov, Soviet aircraft designer (d. 1984).
- 1 April – Alexander Yakovlev, Russian engineer and airplane designer (d. 1989).
- 3 May – Philippe Halsman, Latvian-born American photographer (d. 1979)
- 4 June – Ivan Knunyants, Soviet chemist (d. 1990).
- 17 June – Olli Ungvere, Estonian actress (d. 1991)
- 5 August – Wassily Leontief, Russian economist, Nobel Prize laureate (d. 1999).
- 8 September – Andrei Kirilenko, Soviet politician (d. 1990)
- 25 September – Dmitri Shostakovich, Russian composer and pianist (d. 1975).
- 19 December – Leonid Brezhnev, Soviet politician (d. 1982).

== Deaths ==
- June 14 – Sophia Amirajibi, Georgian poetry translator (b. 1847)
