= Leonid Baratov =

Russian opera director (1895–1964)

- Born: Leonid Vasilyevich Baratov; March 20, 1895; Moscow, Russian Empire
- Died: July 22, 1964 (aged 69); Moscow, Soviet Union
- Occupation: Opera director

Leonid Vasilyevich Baratov (Russian: Леони́д Васи́льевич Бара́тов) (April 1 (O.S. March 20), 1895, Moscow – July 22, 1964, Moscow) was a Soviet opera director and People's Artist of the RSFSR (1958).

Leonid Baratov was awarded Stalin Prizes on several occasions (1943, 1949, 1950, 1951, 1952), three orders, and numerous medals.

== Biography ==
Leonid Baratov was born on 1 April 1895 in Moscow. He studied at the law faculty of Moscow University.
