= Mørkøv (surname) =

Mørkøv is a Danish surname. Notable people with the surname include:

- Jesper Mørkøv (born 1988), Danish cyclist
- Michael Mørkøv (born 1985), Danish cyclist
