= 1955 in the Soviet Union =

- Decades: 1930s; 1940s; 1950s; 1960s; 1970s
- See also: History of the Soviet Union; List of years in the Soviet Union

The following lists events that happened during 1955 in the Union of Soviet Socialist Republics.

== Incumbents ==
- First Secretary of the Communist Party of the Soviet Union – Nikita Khrushchev
- Chairman of the Presidium of the Supreme Soviet of the Soviet Union – Kliment Voroshilov
- Chairman of the Council of Ministers of the Soviet Union – Georgy Malenkov (until 8 February), Nikolai Bulganin (starting 8 February)

== Events ==
=== February ===
- 27 February
  - 1955 Estonian Supreme Soviet election
  - 1955 Soviet Union regional elections

=== May ===
- 14 May – Warsaw Pact

=== June ===
- 2 June – Belgrade declaration

=== November ===
- 15 November – Władysław Gomułka initiates talks about the Repatriation of Poles (1955–59).
- 22 November – The first Soviet hydrogen bomb, RDS-37, is tested.
- 30 November – The 1st Soviet Antarctic Expedition begins.

=== December ===
- 31 December – The Pospelov Commission is set up.

== Births ==
- 1 January – Gennady Lyachin, Russian submarine captain (d. 2000)
- 29 January – Zebiniso Rustamova, archer
- 10 February – Oksana Shvets, Ukrainian actress (d. 2022)
- 22 March – Valdis Zatlers, President of Latvia
- 16 May – Olga Korbut, Belorussian Olympic gymnast
- 11 June – Yuriy Sedykh, Ukrainian hammer thrower (d. 2021)
- 1 July – Nikolai Demidenko, pianist
- 7 August – Vladimir Sorokin, writer
- 7 September – Efim Zelmanov, mathematician
- 13 October – Sergei Shepelev, ice hockey player

== Deaths ==
- 6 January – Yevgeny Tarle, historian (born 1874)
- 19 March – Leonid Govorov, military commander (born 1897)
- 30 September – Michael Chekhov, actor (born 1891)

== See also ==
- 1955 in fine arts of the Soviet Union
- List of Soviet films of 1955
