= 1957 in the Soviet Union =

- Decades: 1930s; 1940s; 1950s; 1960s; 1970s
- See also: History of the Soviet Union; List of years in the Soviet Union

The following lists events that happened during 1957 in the Union of Soviet Socialist Republics.

== Incumbents ==
- First Secretary of the Communist Party of the Soviet Union – Nikita Khrushchev
- Chairman of the Presidium of the Supreme Soviet of the Soviet Union – Kliment Voroshilov
- Chairman of the Council of Ministers of the Soviet Union – Nikolai Bulganin

== Events ==
- 1957 Soviet nuclear tests
- Doctor Zhivago (novel) is published in Italy by Boris Pasternak after being rejected by Soviet censors.

=== May ===
- May – The Anti-Party Group attempts to overthrow Nikita Khrushchev.

=== July ===
- 28 July – The 6th World Festival of Youth and Students is opened.

=== September ===
- 26 September – Soviet submarine M-256 sinks after one of its diesel engines explodes.
- 29 September – Kyshtym disaster

=== October ===
- 4 October – Sputnik 1, the first artificial Earth satellite, is launched.

=== November ===
- November – The 3rd Soviet Antarctic Expedition arrives in Antarctica.
- 7 November – The dog Laika becomes the first animal to orbit the Earth when Sputnik 2 is launched. And also becomes the first animal to die in orbit.

== Births ==
- 16 January – Andris Skele, Prime Minister of Latvia (1995-1997, 1999-2000)
- 27 February – Viktor Markin, athlete
- 14 April – Mikhail Pletnev, pianist
- 10 June – Gediminas Vagnorius, Prime Minister of Lithuania (1991-1992,1996-1999)
- 29 June – Gurbanguly Berdimuhamedow, President of Turkmenistan (2006-2022)
- 24 July – Shavkat Mirziyoyev, President of Uzbekistan
- 11 September – Vladimir Makeev, alpine skier
- 4 October – Aleksandr Tkachyov, gymnast
- 16 October – Guntars Krasts, Prime Minister of Latvia (1997-1998)
- 28 October – Panah Huseyn, Prime Minister of Azerbaijan (1993)
- 3 December – Maxim Korobov, politician
- 8 December – Mikhail Kasyanov, Prime Minister of Russia (2000-2004)
- 28 December – Dumitru Braghis, Prime Minister of Moldova (1999-2001)

== Deaths ==
- 6 January – Amvrosy Buchma, actor (born 1891)
- 20 February – Vyacheslav Malyshev, statesman (born 1902)
- 1 March – Sergey Zhuk, hydraulic engineer (born 1892)
- 9 March – Vasily Larin, general (born 1908)
- 15 April – Yevgeny Tuchkov, state security officer (born 1892)
- 9 July – Alexander Fyodorovich Gedike, composer (born 1877)
- 15 July – Vasily Maklakov, politician (born 1869)
- 9 November – Grigory Arutinov, First Secretary of the Communist Party of Armenia (born 1900)

== See also ==
- 1957 in fine arts of the Soviet Union
- List of Soviet films of 1957
