= Valentin Morkov =

Russian-Moldovan footballer and coach

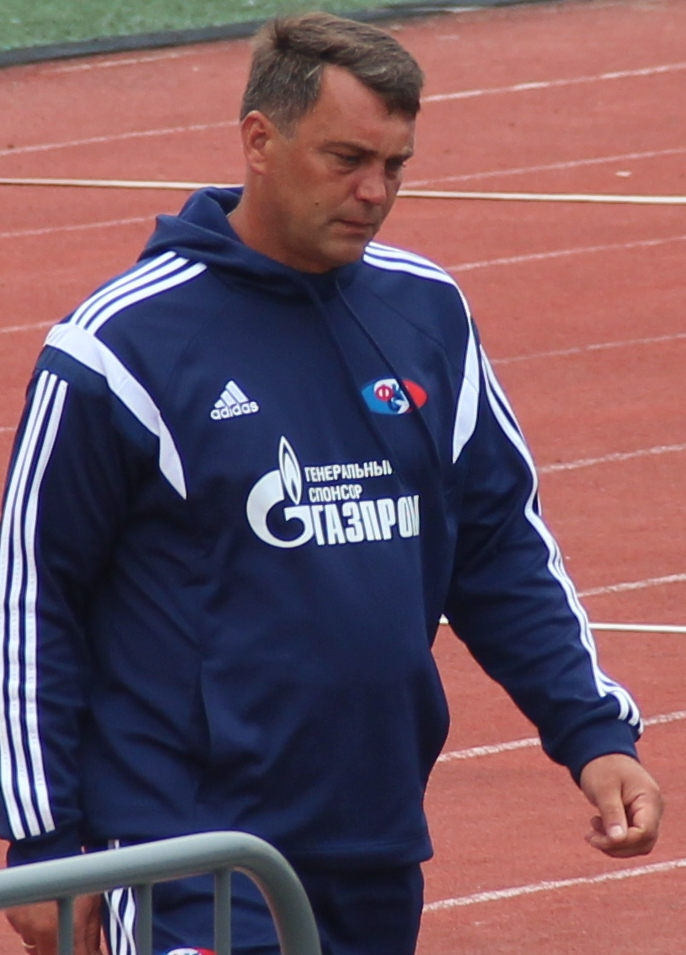

Personal information
- Full name: Valentin Vladimirovich Morkov
- Date of birth: 21 April 1971 (age 55)
- Height: 1.98 m (6 ft 6 in)
- Position: Goalkeeper

Senior career*
Years	Team	Apps	(Gls)
1994–1996	Tiligul Tiraspol	2	(0)
1996	Nistru Ciobruciu	7	(0)
1996–1998	Locomotiva Basarabeasca	39	(0)
2001	FC Yelimay Semipalatinsk	19	(0)
2001–2002	FC Zimbru Chişinău	11	(0)
2008–2009	FC Sakhalin Yuzhno-Sakhalinsk	19	(0)

Managerial career
- 2012–2016: FC Sakhalin Yuzhno-Sakhalinsk (assistant)
- 2017–2023: FC Sakhalin Yuzhno-Sakhalinsk (assistant)
- * Club domestic league appearances and goals

Valentin Vladimirovich Morkov (Russian: Валентин Владимирович Морков; born 21 April 1971) is a Russian professional football coach and a former player. He also holds Moldovan citizenship.
