= Igor Surovikin =

Russian footballer and coach

Personal information
- Full name: Igor Yevgenyevich Surovikin
- Date of birth: January 17, 1962 (age 64)
- Height: 1.81 m (5 ft 11 1/2 in)
- Position: Midfielder

Team information
- Current team: FC Rotor Volgograd (asst coach)

Senior career*
Years	Team	Apps	(Gls)
1979	FC Rotor Volgograd	?	(1)
1980	PFC CSKA Moscow	0	(0)
1980–1983	FC Rotor Volgograd	105	(12)
1984–1985	FC SKA Rostov-on-Don	39	(2)
1986–1990	FC Rotor Volgograd	141	(10)
1990	Kemin Pallotoverit-85 (Finland)		

Managerial career
- 2007: FC Torpedo Volzhsky
- 2008–: FC Rotor Volgograd (assistant)
- * Club domestic league appearances and goals

Igor Yevgenyevich Surovikin (Russian: И́горь Евге́ньевич Сурови́кин; born January 17, 1962) is a Russian professional football coach and a former player. As of July 2009, he works as an assistant manager with FC Rotor Volgograd.

Surovikin played for FC Rotor and coached for the club after retiring from playing.
