= 1933 in the Soviet Union =

- Decades: 1920s; 1930s; 1940s; 1950s
- See also: History of the Soviet Union; List of years in the Soviet Union

The following lists events that happened during 1933 in the Union of Soviet Socialist Republics.

== Incumbents ==
- General Secretary of the Communist Party of the Soviet Union – Joseph Stalin
- Chairman of the Central Executive Committee of the Congress of Soviets – Mikhail Kalinin
- Chairman of the Council of People's Commissars of the Soviet Union – Vyacheslav Molotov
- People's Commissar for military and naval affairs- Kliment Voroshilov
- People's Commissar for heavy industry- Sergo Ordzhonikidze
- People's Commissar for Ways of Communication- Andrey Andreyev
- First Secretary of Moscow urban committee of AUCP(b) - Lazar Kaganovich

== Events ==
- 2 August - White Sea–Baltic Canal opened.
- 5 September - Tupolev ANT-7 crash near Podolsk, which led to a complete reorganization of air traffic in the Soviet Union.

=== Undated ===
- Second Five Year Plan Begins
- The Holodomor famine takes place in Ukraine.
- Joseph Stalin added Article 121 to the entire Soviet Union criminal code, which made male homosexuality a crime punishable by up to five years in prison with hard labor. The law remained intact until after the dissolution of the Soviet Union and was repealed in 1993.

=== Ongoing ===
- Soviet famine of 1932–1933

== Births ==
- 4 January – Ilia II of Georgia, Georgian Orthodox patriarach (died 2026)
- 6 January – Oleg Makarov, cosmonaut (died 2003)
- 15 April - Boris Strugatsky, writer (died 2012)
- 27 April - Leonid Roshal, pediatrician
- 28 April – Dmitry Zimin, radio scientist and businessman (died 2021)
- 12 May - Andrei Voznesensky, poet (died 2010)
- 20 May – Zoya Klyuchko, entomologist (died 2016)
- 19 June – Viktor Patsayev, cosmonaut (died 1971)
- 9 July - Elem Klimov, filmmaker (died 2003)
- 10 September – Yevgeny Khrunov, cosmonaut (died 2000)
- 13 October - Mark Zakharov, filmmaker (died 2019)

== Deaths ==
- 1 March – Uładzimir Zylka, poet
- 7 July – Mykola Skrypnyk, Ukrainian communist leader
- 20 August - Vasily Boldyrev, WWI and Russian Civil War commander
- 8 October - Leonid Vesnin, architect

== See also ==
- 1933 in fine arts of the Soviet Union
- List of Soviet films of 1933
- Five-year plans of the Soviet Union
