= 1902 in Russia =

- Decades: 1880s; 1890s; 1900s; 1910s; 1920s
- See also: History of Russia; Timeline of Russian history; List of years in Russia

Events from the year 1902 in Russia.

== Incumbents ==
- Monarch – Nicholas II

== Events ==
- 1 July - The Admiral Makarov National University of Shipbuilding opens in Mykolayiv, Ukraine, under the name of Mykolayiv Industrial Technical School.
- July - Grand Duke Peter Nikolaevich of Russia is created a Knight of the Order of the Most Holy Annunciation by King Victor Emmanuel III of Italy, during the latter's visit to Russia.
- 29 August - Grand Duchess Elena Vladimirovna of Russia is married to her second cousin Prince Nicholas of Greece and Denmark.
- November - The periodical Novy Put is launched in Saint Petersburg by Dmitry Merezhkovsky and Zinaida Gippius.
- December - The Russian News Agency TASS begins life as the Commercial Telegraph Agency (TTA, Torgovo-Telegrafnoe Agentstvo).

== Births ==
- 8 January - Georgy Malenkov, Leader of the Soviet Union in 1953 (died 1988)
- 21 May - Anatole Litvak, filmmaker (died 1974)
- 11 October - Yitzhak Yitzhaky, Slovenian-born Israeli politician (died 1955)

== Deaths ==
- 2 January - Prince Balakishi Arablinski, Azerbaijani general in the Russian Imperial Army (born 1828)
- June - Isaac Andreyevich Chatzkin, Russian-Jewish physician (born 1832)
