= 1925 in the Soviet Union =

- Decades: 1920s; 1930s; 1940s
- See also: History of the Soviet Union; List of years in the Soviet Union

The following lists events that happened during 1925 in the Union of Soviet Socialist Republics.

== Incumbents ==
- General Secretary of the Communist Party of the Soviet Union – Joseph Stalin
- Chairman of the Central Executive Committee of the Congress of Soviets – Mikhail Kalinin
- Chairman of the Council of People's Commissars of the Soviet Union – Alexei Rykov

== Events ==
=== January ===
- 20 January – The Soviet–Japanese Basic Convention is signed.

=== December ===
- 18–31 December – 14th Congress of the All-Union Communist Party (Bolsheviks)

== Sports ==
- 10 November – 8 December – Moscow 1925 chess tournament

== Births ==
- 2 January – Irina Arkhipova, singer
- 11 January – Viktor Avdyushko, actor
- 15 January – August Englas, Estonian wrestler (d. 2017)
- 30 January – Pyotr Kuznetsov, Red Army soldier and Hero of the Soviet Union
- 19 February – Galina Bogdanova, Russian grinder and production leader (d. 2013)
- 8 March – Efim Geller, chess Grandmaster
- 26 June – Pavel Belyayev, cosmonaut
- 13 September – Sergei Salnikov, footballer
- 20 October – Firudin Shushinski, musicologist
- 24 November – Mikhail Khvatkov, Red Army soldier and Hero of the Soviet Union
- 12 December - Alexander Khmelik, playwright and director (d. 2001)
- 21 December – Tatyana Karakashyants, Olympic diver
- Date unknown – Alexandra Fominykh, farm worker

== Deaths ==
- 6 August - Grigory Kotovsky, Soviet military and political activist, commander of the Red Army and member of the Central Executive Committee of the Soviet Union (born 1881)
- 31 October - Mikhail Frunze, Soviet revolutionary, politician, army officer and military theorist (born 1885)
- 28 December - Sergei Yesenin, Russian lyrical poet of the Silver Age of Russian poetry (born 1895)

== See also ==
- List of Soviet films of 1925
- 1925 in fine arts of the Soviet Union
