= 1903 in Russia =

- Decades: 1880s; 1890s; 1900s; 1910s; 1920s
- See also: History of Russia; Timeline of Russian history; List of years in Russia

Events from the year 1903 in Russia.

== Incumbents ==
- Monarch – Nicholas II

== Events ==
- 14 January - Opening of Hotel National, Moscow
- dates unknown
- 19-21 April - the 49 Jews are killed in the Kishinev Pogrom
- Chernoe Znamia
- Estonian Chess Championship
- Kharovsk
- Klavdiievo-Tarasove
- Mensheviks
- Rahumäe cemetery
- Ševčík-Lhotský Quartet
- Zimin Opera
- ongoing - Central Committee compositions elected by the 1st–3rd congresses of the Russian Social Democratic Labour Party

== Births ==
- 12 January - Igor Kurchatov, Russian physicist (d. 1960)
- 17 April - Gregor Piatigorsky, Russian-born American cellist (d. 1976)
- 6 June - Aram Khachaturian, Soviet-Armenian composer (d. 1978)
- 11 July - Rudolf Abel, Anglo-Russian Soviet intelligence officer (d. 1971)
- 25 September – Mark Rothko, Russian-American abstract artist (d. 1970)
- 1 October – Vladimir Horowitz, Russian-born American pianist (d. 1989)
- 4 December – Lazar Lagin, Russian writer (d. 1979)

== Deaths ==
- 22 May – Dmitry Gamov, Russian general and explorer (b. 1834)
