= 1905 in Russia =

- Decades: 1880s; 1890s; 1900s; 1910s; 1920s
- See also: History of Russia; Timeline of Russian history; List of years in Russia

Events from the year 1905 in Russia.

== Incumbents ==
- Monarch – Nicholas II
- Chairman of the Council of Ministers – Sergei Witte (starting November 6)

== Events ==
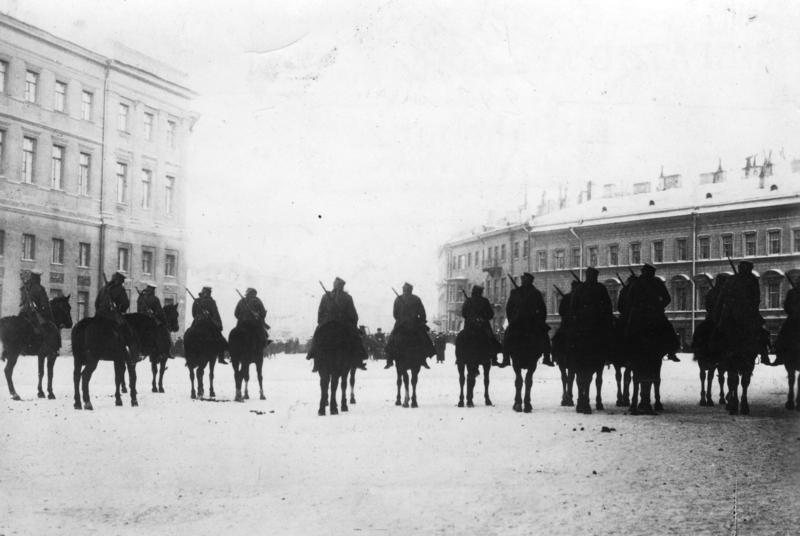
The Bloody Sunday massacre of Russian demonstrators, at the Winter Palace in Saint Petersburg.

- January 1 – The official opening of the Trans-Siberian Railway.
- January 2 – Russo-Japanese War: The Russian Army surrenders at Port Arthur in Qing dynasty China.
- January 22 (January 9 O.S.) – The Bloody Sunday massacre of demonstrators led by Russian Orthodox priest Georgy Gapon trigger the abortive Revolution of 1905.
- January 25 – Tsar Nicholas II appoints General Dmitri Trepov to be the Governor-General of Saint Petersburg, with absolute power to issue regulations to keep order.
- January 26
  - (January 13 O.S.) Russian Revolution of 1905: The Imperial Russian Army fire on demonstrators in Riga, Governorate of Livonia, killing 73 and injuring 200 people.

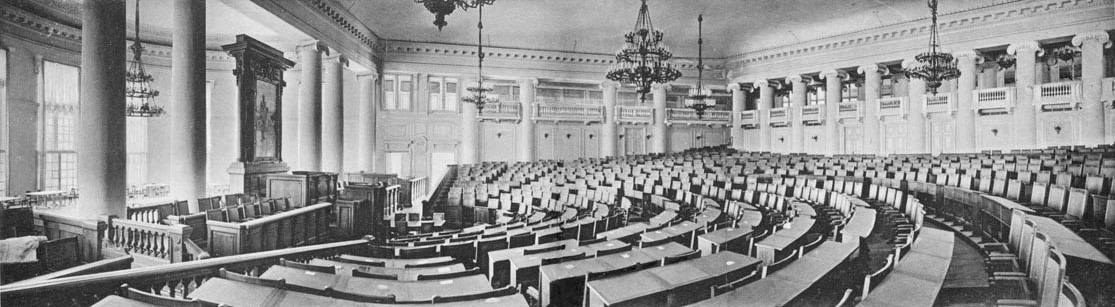
March 3: Nicholas II creates the Duma.

- March 3 – Tsar Nicholas II of Russia agrees to create the Duma.
- March 5 – Russo-Japanese War: Russian troops begin to retreat from Mukden after casualties of 100,000 troops in 3 days.
- March 22 – Russia's Committee of Ministers votes to abolish the compulsory use of the Russian language in schools in "Congress Poland" (Tsarstvo Polskoye).
- April 17 – Tsar Nicholas II issues a decree granting religious freedom to his subjects.
- May 27 – 28 – Russo-Japanese War – Battle of Tsushima: The Japanese fleet under Admiral Heihachiro Togo defeat the Russian fleet under Admiral Zinovi Petrovich Rozhdestvenski in a 2-day battle.
- June 27 – (June 14 according to the Julian calendar): Mutiny breaks out on the Russian ironclad Potemkin.
- August 27 – Tsar Nicholas II issues a decree restoring to Russia's universities the autonomy that had been taken away from them in 1884.
- September 5 – Russo-Japanese War – Treaty of Portsmouth: In New Hampshire, a treaty mediated by U.S. President Theodore Roosevelt is signed by Japan and Russia. Russia cedes the island of Sakhalin and port and rail rights in Manchuria to Japan.
- October 26
  - October 13 O.S: The Saint Petersburg Soviet holds its first meeting, the first elected workers' Soviet (council) in Russia.
- October 29
  - October 16 O.S. Russian Revolution of 1905: The Imperial Russian Army opens fire on a meeting at a street market in Tallinn, Governorate of Estonia, killing 94 and injuring about 200 people.
- October 30 (October 17 Old Style) – October Manifesto: Tsar Nicholas II of Russia is forced to announce the granting of the Russian Constitution of 1906, conceding the State Duma.
- November 4 – The application of the February Manifesto, removing the veto of the Diet of the autonomous Grand Duchy of Finland, is interrupted by the November Manifesto. The Senate of Finland is ordered to put forward a proposal for parliamentary reform based on unicameralism and universal and equal suffrage.
- November–December – Russian Revolution of 1905: Workers and peasants burn and loot hundreds of Baltic German manors in the Baltic governorates. The punitive Imperial Russian Army executes and deports thousands.
- December 15 – The Pushkin House is established in Saint Petersburg, to preserve the cultural heritage of Alexander Pushkin.

== Arts ==
- Konstantin Makovsky - Christmastide Divination

== Literature ==
- Aleksandr I. Kuprin - The Duel
- Fyodor Sologub - The Petty Demon

== Music ==
- Anton Arensky
  - The Tempest
  - Memories, Op. 71
- Mily Balakirev - Piano Sonata No. 2
- Alexander Glazunov
  - Violin Concerto
  - Scène dansante, Op.81
- Anatoly Lyadov
  - Baba Yaga
  - 3 Morceaux, Op. 57
  - 8 Russian Folksngs, Op. 58
- Sergei Lyapunov - Valse-Impromptu No. 1
- Nikolai Rimsky-Korsakov - At the Grave, Op. 61
- Alexander Scriabin
  - 2 Poèmes, Op. 44
  - 3 Pieces, Op. 45
  - Symphony No. 3
  - 3 Pieces, Op. 49
- Sergei Taneyev
  - String Quintet No. 2
  - 10 Romances, Op. 17
  - String Quartet No. 3

== Births ==
- 2 January – Lev Schnirelmann, mathematician and academic (d. 1938)
- 22 March - Grigori Kozintsev, theatre and film director, screenwriter, and pedagogue. (d. 1973)
- 30 April - Sergey Nikolsky, mathematician (d. 2012)
- 6 July - Leonid Potapov, ethnographer (d. 2000)
- Gershon Liebman, Russian-born French rabbi (d. 1997)
