= 1900 in Russia =

- Decades: 1880s; 1890s; 1900s; 1910s; 1920s
- See also: History of Russia; Timeline of Russian history; List of years in Russia

Events from the year 1900 in Russia.

== Incumbents ==
- Monarch – Nicholas II

== Events ==
- Pyramid of Capitalist System
- Russian polar expedition of 1900–02
- Trans-Siberian Railway Panorama
- Russian Empire at the 1900 Summer Olympics
- The premiere of the opera The Tale of Tsar Saltan by Nikolai Rimsky-Korsakov in Moscow
- Amur anti-Chinese pogroms
- The launching of the cruiser Aurora
- The release of the first issue of the RSDLP newspaper Iskra
- The opening of the Moscow Paveletsky railway station
- Fire in the General Staff Building

== Births ==
- 17 January – Prince Nikita Alexandrovich of Russia, a nephew of Tsar Nicholas II of Russia (died 1974)
- 19 January – Mikhail Vasilyevich Isakovsky, poet, lyricist, and translator (died 1973)
- 24 January – Johannes Reesen, politician (died 1937)
- 28 February – Vsevolod Vitalyevich Vishnevsky, writer, screenwriter, playwright, and journalist (died 1951)
- 12 March – Sergey Vladimirovich Nabokov, poet and translator, Vladimir Nabokov's brother (died 1945)
- 22 March – Suleyman Huseyn oglu Rahimov, writer, novelist, prosaist, and politician, a chairman of the Union of Azerbaijani Writers (died 1983)
- 30 March – Nikolai Demyanovich Psurtsev, Colonel General of the Communication Troops, Minister of Communications of the Soviet Union, Knight–Commander of the Order of the British Empire (died 1980)
- 6 April – Konstantin Aleksandrovich Vialov, poster artist, graphic artist, illustrator, set designer (died 1976)
- 14 April – Nikolay Andreyevich Prishchepa, Red Army major general killed in World War II (died 1941)
- 15 April – Alexander Fyodorovich Kazankin, a Red Army Lieutenant general who commanded the Soviet airborne (died 1955)
- 17 April – Elisabeth Pinajeff, actress (died 1995)
- 18 April – Nikolai Nikolaevich Vashugin, general and a political officer (died 1941)
- 19 April – Aleksandr Lukich Ptushko, animation and fantasy film director (died 1973)
- 24 April – Vasily Filippovich Gerasimenko, the lieutenant general who held field army command during World War II (died 1953)
- 28 May – Dmitry Ivanovich Ivanyuk, a Red Army colonel killed in World War II (died 1941)
- 30 June – Pyotr Mikhaylovich Gavrilov, an officer known as the hero of the Defense of Brest Fortress (died 1979)
- 3 July – Margarita Ivanovna Rudomino, librarian, founder of the All-Russia State Library for Foreign Literature (died 1990)
- 6 August – Grigori Shtern, Red Army general (b. 1900)
- 11 September
  - Semyon Alekseyevich Lavochkin, aerospace engineer, and aircraft designer who founded the Lavochkin aircraft design bureau (died 1960)
  - Ivan Nikitich Russiyanov, lieutenant general and Hero of the Soviet Union (died 1984)
- 22 September – Sergey Ozhegov, linguist and lexicographer, author of the Dictionary of the Russian Language (died 1964)
- 2 October – Nicolai Poliakoff OBE, the creator of Coco the Clown (died 1974)
- 5 October – Varvara Sergeyevna Myasnikova, actress (died 1978)
- 21 October – Dmitri Ivanovich Vasilyev, film director (died 1984)
- 26 October – Zvi Preigerzon, an author who specialized in historical prose of a historically fictional nature (died 1969)
- 27 October – Lidia Andreevna Ruslanova, folk singer (died 1973)
- 4 November – Sergei Dmitrievich Vasilyev, film director, screenwriter, and actor (died 1959)
- 6 November – Iosif Leonidovich Prut, a playwright, and the first Soviet screenwriter (died 1996)
- 11 November – Maria Babanova, actress (died 1983)
- 16 November – Nikolai Fyodorovich Pogodin, playwright (died 1962)
- 2 December
  - Nina Ivanovna Gagen-Torn, poet, writer, historian, and ethnographer (died 1986)
  - Aleksandr Andreyevich Prokofiev, poet, journalist, war correspondent, and public figure (died 1971)
- 18 December – Nikolai Vladimirovich Nekrasov, Esperanto writer, translator, and critic (died 1938)

== Deaths ==
- 3 January – Dmitry Vasilyevich Grigorovich, writer (born 1822)
- 11 January – Aleksey Tillo, geographer, cartographer, land surveyor, lieutenant general of the Imperial Russian Army (born 1839)
- 12 January – Giorgi Davidovich Tsereteli, a Georgian writer, and the father of Irakli Tsereteli – a leading figure in the Georgian Mensheviks (born 1842)
- 18 January – Count Fyodor Logginovich Heiden, military commander of German-Dutch ancestry who served in the Imperial Russian Army (born 1821)
- 21 January – Solomon Zalkind Minor, rabbi and writer (born 1827)
- 23 March – Constantin Aleksandrovich Shapiro, a Hebrew lyric poet, and photographer (born 1839)
- 28 March – Apolinary Horawski, painter (born 1833)
- 20 April – Leonid Nikolaevich Maikov, a prominent researcher in the history of Russian literature, a full member of the Saint Petersburg Academy of Sciences, president of the Russian Bibliological Society, Privy Councillor, the son of the painter Nikolay Maykov (born 1839)
- 25 April – Grand Duchess Alexandra Petrovna of Russia, great-granddaughter of Emperor Paul I of Russia, the wife of Grand Duke Nicholas Nikolaevich of Russia (born 1838)
- 1 May – Sergei Sergeyevich Korsakov, neuropsychiatrist (born 1854)
- 2 May – Ivan Konstantinovich Aivazovsky, painter (born 1817)
- 10 May – Mikhail Pavlovich Sabinin, a Russo-Georgian monk, historian of the Georgian Orthodox Church, and icon painter (born 1845)
- 21 June – Count Mikhail Nikolayevich Muravyov, Minister of Foreign Affairs (born 1845)
- 30 June – Ivan Mikheevich Pervushin, a clergyman and mathematician (born 1827)
- 30 June – Alexey Dmitriyevich Startsev, a merchant and industrialist (born 1838)
- 16 July – Prince Alexander Ivanovich Urusov, lawyer, literary critic, translator, and philanthropist (born 1843)
- 19 July – Prince Nikolai Petrovitch Troubetzkoy, a Privy Counsellor and Chamberlain of the Russian Imperial Court (born 1828)
- 30 July – Grigory Avetovich Dzhanshiyev, lawyer, publicist, and historian of Armenian descent (born 1851)
- 4 August – Isaac Ilyich Levitan, painter (born 1860)
- 12 August – Pavel Vasilyevich Shejn, a major Russian and Belarusian ethnographer and folklorist of Jewish origin (born 1826)
- 15 September – Nikolay Ivanovich Krasnov, a writer and lieutenant general of the Imperial Russian Army (born 1833)
- 11 October – Nikolai Mikhailovich Tikhomirov, engineer, public figure, one of the founders of Novosibirsk (born 1857)
- 17 November – Alexander Konstantinovich Bagration-Imeretinsky, a Georgian royal prince, a General of the Imperial Russian Army, and a hero of the Russo-Turkish War (1877-1878) (born 1837)
- 4 December – Alexander Konstantinovch Sheller, writer (born 1838)
