= 1901 in Russia =

- Decades: 1880s; 1890s; 1900s; 1910s; 1920s
- See also: History of Russia; Timeline of Russian history; List of years in Russia

Events from the year 1901 in Russia.

== Incumbents ==
- Monarch – Tsar Nicholas II
- Chairman of the Committee of Ministers – Ivan Durnovo

== Events ==
- January: The Socialist Revolutionary Party was founded in various cities across Russia.
- 26 May – Russian cruiser Boyarin launched without presence of the Imperial Russian Army.
- 7 September – End of the Boxer Rebellion.

== Births ==
- 17 January – Aron Gurwitsch, a Litvak American phenomenologist. (died 1973)
- 4 February – Alexander Werth, writer, journalist, and war correspondent. (died 1969)
- 15 May – Boris Berman (chekist), chekist and leading member of the NKVD.
- 18 June – Grand Duchess Anastasia Nikolaevna of Russia, youngest daughter of Tsar Nicholas II (died 1918)
- 20 June – Princess Nina Georgievna of Russia, elder daughter of Grand Duke George Mikhailovich and Grand Duchess Maria Georgievna of Russia who spent her life in exile (died 1974)
- 15 August – Prince Dmitri Alexandrovich of Russia, nephew of Tsar Nicholas II. (died 1980)
- 12 September
  - Shmuel Hurwitz, Russian-born Israeli agronomist (died 1999)
  - Andrey Vlasov, Russian general of Red Army who later led the Russian Liberation Army against the U.S.S.R. (died 1946)
- 22 September – Nadezhda Alliluyeva, second wife of Joseph Stalin (died 1932)
- 19 November – Nina Bari, mathematician (died 1961)
- 10 December
  - Vladimir Boyarsky, a collaborator with Nazi Germany during World War II, serving in Andrey Vlasov's Russian Liberation Army. (died 1945)
  - Karandash, famous Soviet clown and was the teacher of the famous Russian clowns Oleg Popov and Yuri Nikulin. (died 1983)
- 22 December – Andre Kostelanetz, Russian-born American popular orchestral music conductor and arranger. (died 1980)

== Deaths ==
- Aleksey Alchevsky, Ukrainian entrepreneur who founded the first finance group in Russia. (born 1835)
- Sergei Mihailovich Dukhovskoi, military officer. (born 1838)
- 15 January – Maria Skorsiuk, ballet dancer (born 1872)
- 12 March – Aleksei Aleksandrovich Kozlov, philosopher (born 1831)
- 15 March – Nikolay Bogolepov, jurist and Minister of National enlightenment. (born 1846)
- 12 August – Nikolay Baranov, lieutenant general, Mayor of Saint Petersburg, Governor of Nizhny Novgorod and Arkhangelsk, and Senator. (born 1837)
