= 1904 in Russia =

- Decades: 1880s; 1890s; 1900s; 1910s; 1920s
- See also: History of Russia; Timeline of Russian history; List of years in Russia

Events from the year 1904 in Russia.

== Incumbents ==
- Monarch – Nicholas II
- Chairman of the Committee of Ministers - Sergei Witte

== Events ==
- 9 February – Battle of Chemulpo Bay: a naval engagement at Chemulpo Bay in Korea between Russian and Japanese forces at the start of the Russo-Japanese War.
- Battle of Liaoyang
- Battle of Port Arthur
- 1904 Moscow tornado
- 8 February – The Russo-Japanese War begins with a surprise Japanese attack on Port Arthur.
- Siege of Port Arthur

== Births ==
- 22 January
  - George Balanchine, Russian-born American choreographer (died 1983)
  - Arkady Gaidar, children's writer (died 1941)
- 2 February – Valery Chkalov, Soviet test pilot (died 1938)
- 21 February – Alexei Kosygin, Premier of the Soviet Union (died 1980)
- 4 March – George Gamow, Ukrainian-born American physicist (died 1968)
- 1 April – Nikolai Berzarin, Soviet general (died 1945)
- 6 May – Moshé Feldenkrais, Ukrainian-born Israeli engineer (died 1984)
- 10 July - Haim Ben-Asher, Russian-born Israeli politician (died 1998)
- 24 July – Nikolay Gerasimovich Kuznetsov, Soviet admiral (died 1974)
- 28 July – Pavel Cherenkov, Soviet physicist, Nobel Prize laureate (died 1990)
- 12 August - Alexei Nikolaevich, Tsarevich of Russia (died 1918)
- 16 December – Banat Batyrova (1904–1970), farmer (died 1970)

== Deaths ==
- 15 July [O.S. 2 July] 1904 - Anton Chekhov, Russian playwright and short story writer. (b. 1860)
- 12 December [O.S. 29 November] 1904 - Emanuel Schiffers, Russian chess player (b. 1850)
- Maria A. Neidgardt, courtier (b. 1831)
