= Outline of the Soviet Union =

Location of the Soviet Union

The following outline is provided as an overview of and topical guide to the Soviet Union:

Soviet Union – was a socialist state on the Eurasian continent that existed from 1922 to 1991. A union of multiple subnational Soviet republics, its government and economy were highly centralized. The Soviet Union was a one-party state, governed by the Communist Party with Moscow as its capital. It was a major ally during World War II, a main participant in the Cold War, and it grew in power to become one of the world's two superpowers (the other being the United States). The Soviet Union collapsed in 1991.

== General reference ==
- Common English country name(s): Soviet Union
- Official names of the Soviet Union
  - Official English country name: Union of Soviet Socialist Republics (USSR)
- Nicknames
  - "Ash Heap of History" (coined by Ronald Reagan)
  - "Evil Empire" (coined by Ronald Reagan)
- Common endonym(s):
- Official endonym(s):
- Adjectival(s):
- Demonym(s):

== Geography of the Soviet Union ==
Geography of the Soviet Union

- The Soviet Union was a: country
- Population of the Soviet Union:
- Area of the Soviet Union:
- Atlas of the Soviet Union

=== Location ===
- Soviet Union was situated within the following regions:
  - Eurasia
    - Europe
      - Eastern Europe
    - Asia
      - North Asia
- Time zone(s):
- Extreme points of the Soviet Union

=== Environment of the Soviet Union ===
Environment of the Soviet Union

- Climate of the Soviet Union
- Ecology of the Soviet Union
  - Ecoregions in the Soviet Union
  - Renewable energy in the Soviet Union
- Geology of the Soviet Union

==== Natural geographic features of the Soviet Union ====
Landforms of the Soviet Union

- Bodies of water of the Soviet Union
  - Caspian Sea
  - Lakes of the Soviet Union
- Islands of the Soviet Union
- Mountains of the Soviet Union
  - Caucasus Mountains
  - Ural Mountains
- Rivers of the Soviet Union
  - Waterfalls of the Soviet Union
- Valleys of the Soviet Union
- West Siberian Plain
- World Heritage Sites in the Soviet Union

=== Regions of the Soviet Union ===
Regions of the Soviet Union

- Caspian Sea
- Caucasus Mountains
- European Russia
- North Caucasus
- Siberia
- Ural Mountains
- West Siberian Plain

==== Ecoregions of the Soviet Union ====
Ecoregions in the Soviet Union

==== Administrative divisions of the Soviet Union ====
Subdivisions of the Soviet Union

- Republics of the Soviet Union
  - Autonomous Soviet Socialist Republics of the Soviet Union
- Oblasts of the Soviet Union
  - Autonomous oblasts of the Soviet Union
- Autonomous okrugs
- Closed city
  - List of closed cities
- Capital of the Soviet Union: Capital of the Soviet Union

=== Demography of the Soviet Union ===
Demographics of the Soviet Union

- Soviet people
- Languages of the Soviet Union
- Religion in the Soviet Union
- Crime in the Soviet Union
- 1989 Soviet Census

== Government and politics of the Soviet Union ==
Politics of the Soviet Union

- Form of government: One-party state
- Capital of the Soviet Union: Capital of the Soviet Union
- Elections in the Soviet Union

=== Ideologies of the Soviet Union ===
Political ideologies of the Soviet Union

- Ideology of the Communist Party of the Soviet Union
- State ideology of the Soviet Union
- Marxism–Leninism
- Leninism
- Brezhnevism

=== Repression in the Soviet Union ===
==== Ideological repression in the Soviet Union ====
Ideological repression in the Soviet Union

- Religion in the Soviet Union
- Suppressed research in the Soviet Union
- Censorship in the Soviet Union
- Censorship of images in the Soviet Union

==== Political repression in the Soviet Union ====
Political repression in the Soviet Union

- Red Terror
- Collectivization in the Soviet Union
- Great Purge
- Population transfer in the Soviet Union
- Gulag
  - List of Gulag camps
- Holodomor
- Political abuse of psychiatry in the Soviet Union

=== Political parties of the Soviet Union ===
Political parties in the Soviet Union

- Communist Party of the Soviet Union
  - Ideology of the Communist Party of the Soviet Union
  - Organization of the Communist Party of the Soviet Union
  - Central Committee of the Communist Party of the Soviet Union
    - Politburo of the Communist Party of the Soviet Union
    - Secretariat of the Communist Party of the Soviet Union
  - Congress of the Communist Party of the Soviet Union
  - General Secretary of the Communist Party of the Soviet Union

=== Branches of the government of the Soviet Union ===
Government of the Soviet Union

- Collective leadership in the Soviet Union

Governmental bodies

- Congress of Soviets (1922–1936)
- Supreme Soviet (1938–1991)
- Congress of People's Deputies (1989–1991)
- Supreme Court of the Soviet UnionSubdivisions of the Soviet Union

==== Executive branch of the government of the Soviet Union ====
- Head of state: President of the Soviet Union,
  - Presidential Council of the Soviet Union (1990)
  - State Council of the Soviet Union (1991)
- Head of government: Premier of the Soviet Union,
  - List of leaders of the Soviet Union
    - Collective leadership in the Soviet Union
  - List of Governments of the Soviet Union
  - Deputy Premier of the Soviet Union
    - First Deputy Premier of the Soviet Union
- Cabinet of the Soviet Union

===== Soviet security services =====
Soviet security services

- Cheka
- State Political Directorate
- NKVD
- Ministry of Internal Affairs (Russia)
- Ministry of State Security (Soviet Union)
- KGB

==== Legislative branch of the government of the Soviet Union ====
- Parliament of the Soviet Union (bicameral)
  - Upper house: Soviet of Nationalities
  - Lower house: Soviet of the Union

==== Judicial branch of the government of the Soviet Union ====
Court system of the Soviet Union

- Supreme Court of the Soviet Union

=== Foreign relations of the Soviet Union ===
Foreign relations of the Soviet Union

- Brezhnev Doctrine
- Passport system in the Soviet Union

=== Law and order in the Soviet Union ===
Law of the Soviet Union

- Capital punishment in the Soviet Union
- Constitution of the Soviet Union
- Crime in the Soviet Union
- Human rights in the Soviet Union
  - LGBT rights in the Soviet Union

=== Military of the Soviet Union ===
Military of the Soviet Union

- Command
  - Commander-in-chief:
    - Ministry of Defence of the Soviet Union
- Forces
  - Army of the Soviet Union
  - Navy of the Soviet Union
  - Air Force of the Soviet Union
  - Special forces of the Soviet Union
- Military history of the Soviet Union
- Military ranks of the Soviet Union

=== Local government in the Soviet Union ===
Local government in the Soviet Union

== General history of the Soviet Union ==
History of the Soviet Union

=== General history of the Soviet Union, by period ===
History of the Soviet Union

- Russian Revolution (1917)
  - February Revolution
  - October Revolution
- Russian Civil War
- Russian Soviet Federative Socialist Republic
- Treaty on the Creation of the USSR
- New Economic Policy
- Stalinism
- Great Purge
- Soviet Union in World War II
- Cold War
- Khrushchev Thaw
- 1965 Soviet economic reform
- Era of Stagnation
- Perestroika
- Glasnost
- Revolutions of 1989
- Dissolution of the Soviet Union
- Nostalgia for the Soviet Union
- Post-Soviet states
- Cold War II

==== History of the Soviet Union, by year ====
- 1922 in the Soviet Union
- 1923 in the Soviet Union
- 1924 in the Soviet Union
- 1925 in the Soviet Union
- 1926 in the Soviet Union
- 1927 in the Soviet Union
- 1928 in the Soviet Union
- 1929 in the Soviet Union
- 1930 in the Soviet Union
- 1931 in the Soviet Union
- 1932 in the Soviet Union
- 1933 in the Soviet Union
- 1934 in the Soviet Union
- 1935 in the Soviet Union
- 1936 in the Soviet Union
- 1937 in the Soviet Union
- 1938 in the Soviet Union
- 1939 in the Soviet Union
- 1940 in the Soviet Union
- 1941 in the Soviet Union
- 1942 in the Soviet Union
- 1943 in the Soviet Union
- 1944 in the Soviet Union
- 1945 in the Soviet Union
- 1946 in the Soviet Union
- 1947 in the Soviet Union
- 1948 in the Soviet Union
- 1949 in the Soviet Union
- 1950 in the Soviet Union
- 1951 in the Soviet Union
- 1952 in the Soviet Union
- 1953 in the Soviet Union
- 1954 in the Soviet Union
- 1955 in the Soviet Union
- 1956 in the Soviet Union
- 1957 in the Soviet Union
- 1958 in the Soviet Union
- 1959 in the Soviet Union
- 1960 in the Soviet Union
- 1961 in the Soviet Union
- 1962 in the Soviet Union
- 1963 in the Soviet Union
- 1964 in the Soviet Union
- 1965 in the Soviet Union
- 1966 in the Soviet Union
- 1967 in the Soviet Union
- 1968 in the Soviet Union
- 1969 in the Soviet Union
- 1970 in the Soviet Union
- 1971 in the Soviet Union
- 1972 in the Soviet Union
- 1973 in the Soviet Union
- 1974 in the Soviet Union
- 1975 in the Soviet Union
- 1976 in the Soviet Union
- 1977 in the Soviet Union
- 1978 in the Soviet Union
- 1979 in the Soviet Union
- 1980 in the Soviet Union
- 1981 in the Soviet Union
- 1982 in the Soviet Union
- 1983 in the Soviet Union
- 1984 in the Soviet Union
- 1985 in the Soviet Union
- 1986 in the Soviet Union
- 1987 in the Soviet Union
- 1988 in the Soviet Union
- 1989 in the Soviet Union
- 1990 in the Soviet Union
- 1991 in the Soviet Union

=== History of the Soviet Union, by subject ===
- Economic history of the Soviet Union
- History of the Jews in the Soviet Union
- Military history of the Soviet Union

== Culture of the Soviet Union ==
Culture of the Soviet Union

- Architecture of the Soviet Union
  - Constructivist architecture
  - Stalinist architecture
- Fashion in the Soviet Union
- Languages of the Soviet Union
- Media in the Soviet Union
  - Propaganda in the Soviet Union
- People of the Soviet Union
- Public holidays in the Soviet Union
- World Heritage Sites in the Soviet Union

=== Art in the Soviet Union ===
- Cinema of the Soviet Union
- Dance in the Soviet Union
  - Russian ballet
  - Soviet ballroom dances
- Literature of the Soviet Union
- Music of the Soviet Union
  - Soviet opera
- Television in the Soviet Union

=== Languages of the Soviet Union ===
Languages of the Soviet Union

- Linguistics of the Soviet Union

=== Religion in the Soviet Union ===
- Religion in the Soviet Union
  - Christianity in the Soviet Union
  - Islam in the Soviet Union
  - Judaism in the Soviet Union

=== Sports in the Soviet Union ===
Sports in the Soviet Union

- Soviet Union at the Olympics
- Football in the Soviet Union

=== Symbols of the Soviet Union ===
- State Anthem of the Soviet Union
- State Emblem of the Soviet Union
  - Emblems of the Soviet Republics
- Flag of the Soviet Union
  - Flags of the Soviet Republics

== Economy and infrastructure of the Soviet Union ==
Economy of the Soviet Union

- Economic rank (by nominal GDP):
- Agriculture in the Soviet Union
- Banking in the Soviet Union
  - Gosbank
- Communications in the Soviet Union
  - Radio in the Soviet Union
  - Internet in the Soviet Union
    - .su
- Currency of the Soviet Union: Soviet ruble
- Five-year plans of the Soviet Union
- Economic history of the Soviet Union
- Energy in the Soviet Union
  - Energy policy of the Soviet Union
- Soviet inventions
  - Timeline of Russian innovation § Soviet Union
- Net material product
- Transport in the Soviet Union
  - Airports in the Soviet Union
  - Rail transport in the Soviet Union
  - Roads in the Soviet Union
- Water supply and sanitation in the Soviet Union

== Education in the Soviet Union ==
Education in the Soviet Union

== Science and technology in the Soviet Union ==
=== Science organizations in the Soviet Union ===
- Communist Academy
- Russian Academy of Sciences § The Academy of Sciences of the USSR
- USSR Academy of Medical Sciences
- Lenin All-Union Academy of Agricultural Sciences
- USSR Academy of Pedagogical Sciences
- Sharashkas
- Naukograds

== See also ==
- Outline of Russia

Soviet society

- Soviet people
  - Soviet working class

Politics

Opposition (politics)

- Soviet dissidents and their groups
- Category:Soviet opposition groups
