= 2003 in Russia =

- Decades: 1980s; 1990s; 2000s; 2010s; 2020s
- See also: History of Russia; Timeline of Russian history; List of years in Russia

Events from the year 2003 in Russia.

== Incumbents ==
- President — Vladimir Putin
- Prime Minister — Mikhail Kasyanov

=== Governors ===
- Amur Oblast: Leonid Korotkov (Independent / ER ally)
- Arkhangelsk Oblast: Anatoly Yefremov (ER)
- Astrakhan Oblast: Anatoly Guzhvin (ER)
- Belgorod Oblast: Yevgeny Savchenko (ER)
- Bryansk Oblast: Yury Lodkin (CPRF)
- Chelyabinsk Oblast: Pyotr Sumin (ER)
- Irkutsk Oblast: Boris Govorin (ER)
- Ivanovo Oblast: Vladimir Tikhonov (CPRF)
- Kaliningrad Oblast: Vladimir Yegorov (ER)
- Kaluga Oblast: Anatoly Artamonov (ER)
- Kemerovo Oblast: Aman Tuleyev (ER)
- Kirov Oblast: Vladimir Shaklein (Independent / ER ally)
- Kostroma Oblast: Viktor Shershunov (CPRF)
- Kurgan Oblast: Oleg Bogomolov (Independent / ER ally)
- Kursk Oblast: Aleksandr Mikhailov (CPRF)
- Leningrad Oblast: Valery Serdyukov (ER)
- Lipetsk Oblast: Oleg Korolyov (ER)
- Magadan Oblast: Nikolai Dudov (ER)
- Moscow Oblast: Boris Gromov (ER)
- Murmansk Oblast: Yuri Yevdokimov (ER)
- Nizhny Novgorod Oblast: Gennady Khodyrev (ER)
- Novgorod Oblast: Mikhail Prusak (ER)
- Novosibirsk Oblast: Viktor Tolokonsky (ER)
- Omsk Oblast: Leonid Polezhayev (ER)
- Orenburg Oblast: Alexey Chernyshev (APR / ER ally)
- Oryol Oblast: Yegor Stroyev (ER)
- Penza Oblast: Vasily Bochkarev (ER)
- Pskov Oblast: Yevgeny Mikhailov (ER)
- Rostov Oblast: Vladimir Chub (ER)
- Ryazan Oblast: Vyacheslav Lyubimov (CPRF)
- Sakhalin Oblast: Igor Farkhutdinov (Independent, until August 20), Ivan Malakhov (ER, starting August 20)
- Samara Oblast: Konstantin Titov (ER)
- Saratov Oblast: Dmitry Ayatskov (ER)
- Smolensk Oblast: Viktor Maslov (ER)
- Tambov Oblast: Oleg Betin (ER)
- Tomsk Oblast: Viktor Kress (ER)
- Tula Oblast: Vasily Starodubtsev (CPRF)
- Tver Oblast: Vladimir Platov (ER, until December 30), Dmitry Zelenin (ER, starting December 30)
- Tyumen Oblast: Sergey Sobyanin (ER)
- Ulyanovsk Oblast: Vladimir Shamanov (ER)
- Vladimir Oblast: Nikolay Vinogradov (CPRF)
- Volgograd Oblast: Nikolai Maksyuta (CPRF)
- Vologda Oblast: Vyacheslav Pozgalyov (ER)
- Voronezh Oblast: Vladimir Kulakov (ER)
- Yaroslavl Oblast: Anatoly Lisitsyn (ER)
- Jewish Autonomous Oblast: Nikolay Volkov (ER)

== Events ==
=== March ===
- March 23 — A referendum in the break-away republic of Chechnya approves a new constitution.

=== April ===
- April 17 — Assassination of Sergei Yushenkov, co-chairman of the Liberal Russia party and critic of President Vladimir Putin.
- April 29 — Prime Minister of the United Kingdom Tony Blair holds a one-day summit with President Putin. Putin mocks Britain's and America's failure to locate weapons of mass destruction in Iraq.

=== May ===
- May 12 — 2003 Znamenskoye suicide bombing: Three suicide bombers drive a truck bomb into the FSB directorate complex in Znamenskoye, Chechen Republic killing at least 59 people.

=== July ===
- July 2 — 36-year-old billionaire oil baron Roman Abramovich buys the English football club Chelsea for £140million.

=== October ===
- October 25 — Arrest of Mikhail Khodorkovsky, chairman of the YUKOS oil company, on charges of fraud.
- October 27–30 — The stock market falls by 16.5% as the arrest of Mikhail Khodorkovsky is seen as politically motivated leading to a loss in business confidence.

=== December ===
- December 4 — A Chechen suicide bomber killed 41 aboard a train near Yessentuki Station
- December 7 — President Putin's United Russia party wins the largest number of seats in the legislative election.
- December 31 — the end of the birth of the Russian Millennium generation

== Births ==
- January 23 — Apollinariia Panfilova, pair skater
- March 7 — Polina Kostiukovich, Russian pair skater
- April 30 — Misha Smirnov, singer, producer-songwriter
- July 4 — Polina Bogusevich, singer

== Deaths ==
=== January ===
- January 8 — Kir Nesis, marine biologist and malacologist (b. 1934)
- January 11 — Yuri Tishkov, professional footballer, sports agent and commentator (b. 1971)
- January 26 — Valeriy Brumel, high jumper (men's Olympic high jump medals: 1960 silver, 1964 gold) (b. 1942)
- January 29
  - Natalia Dudinskaya, prima ballerina (b. 1912)
  - Yevgeniya Sidorova, alpine skier (b. 1930)

=== February ===
- February 5 — Antonina Shuranova, stage, television and film actress (b. 1936)
- February 14 — Grigory Mkrtychan, ice hockey goalkeeper (b. 1925)
- February 19 — Igor Gorbachyov, actor, theater director and pedagogue (b. 1927)
- February 23 — Pavel Lebeshev, cinematographer (b. 1940)

=== March ===
- March 5 — Dzhabrail Yamadayev, Chechen rebel field commander (b. 1970)
- March 8 — Eduard Izotov, film actor (b. 1936)
- March 10 — Marina Ladynina, stage and film actress (b. 1908)
- March 15 — Yevgeny Belyayev, cross-country skier (b. 1954)
- March 24 — Yevgeny Klevtsov, cyclist (b. 1929)
- March 28 — Aleksey Kuznetsov, cross-country skier (b. 1929)
- March 29
  - Kerim Kerimov, engineer and general (b. 1917)
  - Vladimir Pikalov, general (b. 1924)
- March 30 — Valentin Pavlov, 11th Premier of the Soviet Union (b. 1937)
- March 31 — Semyon Lipkin, writer, poet and literary translator (b. 1911)

=== April ===
- April 6 — Aleksandr Fatyushin, film and theater actor (b. 1951)
- April 17
  - Sergei Yushenkov, politician (b. 1950)
  - Masha and Dasha Krivoshlyapova, ischiopagus tripus conjoined twins (b. 1950)
- April 18 — Emil Loteanu, film director (b. 1936)
- April 24 — Yuri Kholopov, musicologist and educator (b. 1932)
- April 25 — Viktor Bushuev, weightlifter (b. 1933)
- April 29 — Vasily Tolstikov, 8th First Secretary of the Leningrad Regional Committee of the Communist Party of the Soviet Union (b. 1917)

=== May ===
- May 9 — Aleksey Medvedev, heavyweight weightlifter (b. 1927)
- May 12 — Anatoly Dobryakov, 1st Governor of Pskov Oblast (b. 1939)
- May 14 — Gennadiy Nikonov, firearm engineer (b. 1950)
- May 21 — Yaroslav Golovanov, journalist, writer and science communicator (b. 1932)
- May 28 — Oleg Makarov, cosmonaut (b. 1933)
- May 30 — Zagir Ismagilov, Bashkir composer and pedagogue (b. 1917)

=== June ===
- June 1 — Yevgeny Matveyev, actor and film director (b. 1922)
- June 3 — Petre Mshvenieradze, water polo player (b. 1929)
- June 9 — German Sveshnikov, fencer (b. 1937)
- June 14 — Nikolai Figurovsky, film director, screenwriter, writer and professor at VGIK (b. 1923)
- June 21 — Sergei Vronsky, cinematographer (b. 1923)
- June 23 — Alexander Sidelnikov, ice hockey player (b. 1950)

=== July ===
- July 3 — Yuri Shchekochikhin, investigative journalist, writer and liberal lawmaker (b. 1950)
- July 5 — Roman Lyashenko, ice hockey player (b. 1979)
- July 8 — Dimitri Sukhorukov, army general (b. 1922)
- July 11 — Stepan Chervonenko, diplomat (b. 1915)
- July 16 — Dmitri Vasilyev, actor, monarchist, antisemite and ultranationalist (b. 1945)
- July 20 — Vladimir Krantz, painter (b. 1913)
- July 24 — Iya Arepina, actress (b. 1930)

=== August ===
- August 2 — Vladimir Golovanov, weightlifter (b. 1938)
- August 7 — Grigoriy Bondarevsky, professor, writer and historian (b. 1920)
- August 14
  - Viktor Ivanov, rower (b. 1930)
  - Lev Kerbel, sculptor (b. 1917)
- August 20 — Igor Farkhutdinov, 3rd Governor of Sakhalin Oblast (b. 1950)
- August 21 — Vasily Borisov, rifle shooter (b. 1922)
- August 28 — Yury Saulsky, composer and author (b. 1928)

=== September ===
- September 5 — Kir Bulychev, science fiction writer, critic and historian (b. 1934)
- September 9 — Aleksandr Moiseyev, basketball player (b. 1927)
- September 18 — Sergey Smirnov, track and field athlete (b. 1960)
- September 23 — Yuri Senkevich, physician and scientist (b. 1937)

=== October ===
- October 7 — Viktor Leonov, navy officer (b. 1916)
- October 10 — Igor Borisov, rower (b. 1924)
- October 26
  - Elem Klimov, filmmaker (b. 1933)
  - Leonid Filatov, actor, director, poet and pamphleteer (b. 1946)

=== November ===
- November 3
  - Rasul Gamzatov, Avar poet (b. 1923)
  - Yuri Falin, football player (b. 1937)
- November 11 — Andrei Bolibrukh, mathematician (b. 1950)
- November 22 — Yuri Khukhrov, realist painter, graphic artist and art teacher (b. 1932)

=== December ===
- December 21 — Oleg Troyanovsky, diplomat (b. 1919)
- December 23 — Valentin Gavrilov, high jumper (b. 1946)
- December 24 — Eugene Maltsev, painter (b. 1929)
- December 26 — Ivan Petrov, bass opera singer (b. 1920)
- December 30 — Vladimir Bogomolov, writer (b. 1924)
- December 31 — German Apukhtin, footballer (b. 1936)

== See also ==
- List of Russian films of 2003
