= 2005 in Russia =

- Decades: 1980s; 1990s; 2000s; 2010s; 2020s
- See also: History of Russia; Timeline of Russian history; List of years in Russia

Events from the year 2005 in Russia.

== Incumbents ==
- President: Vladimir Putin
- Prime Minister: Mikhail Fradkov

=== Governors ===
- Amur Oblast: Leonid Korotkov (ER)
- Arkhangelsk Oblast: Nikolai Kiselev (ER)
- Astrakhan Oblast: Alexander Zhilkin (ER)
- Belgorod Oblast: Yevgeny Savchenko (ER)
- Bryansk Oblast: Nikolay Denin (ER)
- Chelyabinsk Oblast: Pyotr Sumin (ER)
- Irkutsk Oblast: Boris Govorin (ER, until September 8), Aleksandr Tishanin (ER, starting September 8)
- Ivanovo Oblast: Vladimir Tikhonov (CPRF, until December 21), Mikhail Men (ER, starting December 21)
- Kaliningrad Oblast: Vladimir Yegorov (ER, until September 28), Georgy Boos (ER, starting September 28)
- Kaluga Oblast: Anatoly Artamonov (ER)
- Kemerovo Oblast: Aman Tuleyev (ER)
- Kirov Oblast: Vladimir Shaklein (ER)
- Kostroma Oblast: Viktor Shershunov (CPRF)
- Kurgan Oblast: Oleg Bogomolov (ER)
- Kursk Oblast: Aleksandr Mikhailov (ER)
- Leningrad Oblast: Valery Serdyukov (ER)
- Lipetsk Oblast: Oleg Korolyov (ER)
- Magadan Oblast: Nikolai Dudov (ER)
- Moscow Oblast: Boris Gromov (ER)
- Murmansk Oblast: Yuri Yevdokimov (ER)
- Nizhny Novgorod Oblast: Gennady Khodyrev (ER, until August 8), Valery Shantsev (ER, starting August 8)
- Novgorod Oblast: Mikhail Prusak (ER)
- Novosibirsk Oblast: Viktor Tolokonsky (ER)
- Omsk Oblast: Leonid Polezhayev (ER)
- Orenburg Oblast: Alexey Chernyshev (ER)
- Oryol Oblast: Yegor Stroyev (ER)
- Penza Oblast: Vasily Bochkarev (ER)
- Pskov Oblast: Mikhail Kuznetsov (ER)
- Rostov Oblast: Vladimir Chub (ER)
- Ryazan Oblast: Georgy Shpak (Rodina / ER ally)
- Sakhalin Oblast: Ivan Malakhov (ER)
- Samara Oblast: Konstantin Titov (ER)
- Saratov Oblast: Dmitry Ayatskov (ER, until April 5), Pavel Ipatov (ER, starting April 5)
- Smolensk Oblast: Viktor Maslov (ER)
- Tambov Oblast: Oleg Betin (ER)
- Tomsk Oblast: Viktor Kress (ER)
- Tula Oblast: Vasily Starodubtsev (CPRF, until April 29), Vyacheslav Dudka (ER, starting April 29)
- Tver Oblast: Dmitry Zelenin (ER)
- Tyumen Oblast: Sergey Sobyanin (ER, until November 14), Vladimir Yakushev (ER, starting November 24)
- Ulyanovsk Oblast: Sergey Morozov (ER)
- Vladimir Oblast: Nikolay Vinogradov (CPRF)
- Volgograd Oblast: Nikolai Maksyuta (CPRF)
- Vologda Oblast: Vyacheslav Pozgalyov (ER)
- Voronezh Oblast: Vladimir Kulakov (ER)
- Yaroslavl Oblast: Anatoly Lisitsyn (ER)
- Jewish Autonomous Oblast: Nikolay Volkov (ER)

== Events ==
- January 1: Monetization of in-kind benefits
- January 15: 2005 Dagestan Raids
- March 17: Assassination attempt of Anatoly Chubais. Vladimir Kvachkov was charged for the crime, but was acquitted by a jury.
- May 25: 2005 Moscow power blackouts
- June 4: Borozdinovskaya operation
- July 1: Makhachkala Rus bombing
- July 1: King's Gate in Kaliningrad reopens after renovation, marking the city's 750th anniversary.
- August 24–30: 1000th Anniversary of Kazan celebrations.
  - August 27: Kazan Metro opens
  - August 29: TatNeft Arena opens
- September 27: Chief Rabbi of Moscow Pinchas Goldschmidt expelled from Russia during passport control at Domodedovo airport. The incident is related to the conflict between the Jewish community of Moscow and the Russian Jewish Congress.
- October 1: the first meeting of the Civic Chamber of Russia
- October 3: White Army general Anton Denikin and philosopher Ivan Ilyin reburied in the Donskoy Monastery necropolis
- October 13–14: 2005 Nalchik raid
- November 4: the first National Unity Day celebration in Russia. Also, the first Russian March took place on 4 November 2005 and was the first legal far-right mass meeting in modern Russian history.
- November 17: launch of Blue Stream gas pipeline
- December 1: Komi-Permyak Autonomous Okrug merged with Perm Oblast to form Perm Krai.
- December 4: 2005 Moscow City Duma election. United Russia received 47.25% of the votes, the Communist Party of the Russian Federation - 16.75%, and Yabloko - 11.11%. The remaining parties were unable to overcome the 10 percent threshold. The turnout at the elections was 34.77% of the total registered voters.
- December 10: Russia Today begin its broadcast

== Deaths ==
=== January ===
- January 1 — Dmitry Nelyubin, cyclist (b. 1971)
- January 6 — Boris Shtokolov, singer (b. 1930)
- January 7
  - Evgeny Chuprun, realist painter (b. 1927)
  - Aleksandr Prokhorov, footballer (b. 1946)
- January 15 — Leonid Brekhovskikh, scientist (b. 1917)
- January 17 — Anatoly Kartashov, water polo player and Olympic silver medalist (b. 1937)
- January 19 — Rinat Mardanshin, motorcycle speedway rider (b. 1963)
- January 24 — Lev Saychuk, Olympic fencer (b. 1923)

=== February ===
- February 2 — Magomed Omarov, Deputy Interior Minister of Dagestan (b. 1947)
- February 6 — Lazar Berman, classical pianist (b. 1930)
- February 7 — Leonid Gissen, rower and Olympic medalist (b. 1931)
- February 10 — Igor Ledogorov, actor (b. 1932)
- February 11 — Vladimir Kotelnikov, electrical engineer (b. 1908)
- February 15 — Yury Morozov, football player and coach (b. 1934)
- February 24 — Galina Kreft, sprint canoer (b. 1950)
- February 28 — Evgeny Alekseev, basketball player and coach (b. 1919)

=== March ===
- March 2 — Viktor Kapitonov, road cyclist (b. 1933)
- March 8
  - Aslan Maskhadov, Chechen separatist leader (b. 1951)
  - Ninel Shakhova, television journalist (b. 1935)
- March 16 — Timofei Dokschitzer, trumpeter and music teacher (b. 1921)
- March 23 — Rizvan Chitigov, Chechen rebel field commander (b. 1964)
- March 26 — Klara Luchko, actress (b. 1925)

=== April ===
- April 10 — Anatoly Trofimov, KGB officer (b. 1940)

=== May ===
- May 2 — Raisa Struchkova, dancer (b. 1925)
- May 15
  - Natalya Gundareva, actress (b. 1948)
  - Vakha Arsanov, Chechen warlord (b. 1958)
- May 17 — Vladimir Stogov, weightlifter, world champion and Olympic medalist (b. 1930)
- May 22 — Vitaly Mukha, 1st Governor of Novosibirsk Oblast (b. 1936)
- May 27 — Abuzar Aydamirov, writer (b. 1933)

=== June ===
- June 1 — Dmitry Bystrov, footballer (b. 1967)
- June 6 — Maya Kopitseva, painter (b. 1924)
- June 23 — Nikolay Afanasevsky, diplomat (b. 1940)

=== July ===
- July 9 — Yevgeny Grishin, speed skater (b. 1931)
- July 20 — Nikolay Aksyonenko, former chief of the Russian Railways (b. 1949)
- July 24 — Viktor Berkovsky, bard (b. 1932)

=== August ===
- August 4 — Anatoly Larkin, theoretical physicist (b. 1932)
- August 6
  - Valentin Nikulin, theater and film actor (b. 1932)
  - Nikolay Abramov, footballer (b. 1950)
- August 7 — Mikhail Yevdokimov, comedian and politician (b. 1957)
- August 9 — Nikolay Serebryakov, film director (b. 1928)
- August 16 — Alexander Gomelsky, basketball player and coach (b. 1928)
- August 24 — Yuri Sarantsev, actor (b. 1928)
- August 29 — Nikolai Bakhvalov, mathematician (b. 1934)
- August 31 — Nina Ulyanenko, aviator (b. 1923)

=== September ===
- September 18 — Yegor Yakovlev, journalist (b. 1930)
- September 20 — Yuri Aizenshpis, music manager and producer (b. 1945)
- September 21 — Mustai Karim, Bashkir poet (b. 1919)
- September 29 — Gennady Sarafanov, cosmonaut (b. 1942)
- September 30 — Sergei Starostin, historical linguist (b. 1953)

=== October ===
- October 13 — Ilyas Gorchkhanov, North Caucasus warlord (b. 1967)
- October 14 — Oleg Lundstrem, composer and conductor (b. 1916)
- October 18 — Alexander Yakovlev, politician and architect of Perestroika (b. 1923)
- October 26 — Margarita Nazarova, circus performer and actress (b. 1926)
- October 29 — Valery Kokov, 1st Head of the Kabardino-Balkarian Republic (b. 1941)

=== November ===
- November 2 — Yevgeny Kuznetsov, 1st Governor of Stavropol Krai (b. 1938)
- November 3 — Otto Latsis, journalist (b. 1934)
- November 7
  - Nikolay Trofimov, theater and film actor (b. 1920)
  - Mikhail Gasparov, literary theorist (b. 1935)
- November 18 — Armen Abaghian, nuclear scientist (b. 1933)
- November 19 — Karen Ter-Martirosian, theoretical physicist (b. 1922)
- November 25 — Polina Gelman, WWII flight navigator (b. 1919)

=== December ===
- December 5 — Vladimir Toporov, philologist (b. 1928)
- December 8 — Georgiy Zhzhanov, stage and film actor and writer (b. 1915)
- December 20 — Genrikh Fedosov, football player (b. 1932)
- December 26 — Viktor Stepanov, actor (b. 1947)

== See also ==
- List of Russian films of 2005
