= 2006 in Russia =

- Decades: 1980s; 1990s; 2000s; 2010s; 2020s
- See also: History of Russia; Timeline of Russian history; List of years in Russia

Events from the year 2006 in Russia.

== Incumbents ==
- President: Vladimir Putin
- Prime Minister: Mikhail Fradkov

=== Governors ===
- Amur Oblast: Leonid Korotkov (ER)
- Arkhangelsk Oblast: Nikolai Kiselev (ER)
- Astrakhan Oblast: Alexander Zhilkin (ER)
- Belgorod Oblast: Yevgeny Savchenko (ER)
- Bryansk Oblast: Nikolay Denin (ER)
- Chelyabinsk Oblast: Pyotr Sumin (ER)
- Irkutsk Oblast: Aleksandr Tishanin (ER)
- Ivanovo Oblast: Mikhail Men (ER)
- Kaliningrad Oblast: Georgy Boos (ER)
- Kaluga Oblast: Anatoly Artamonov (ER)
- Kemerovo Oblast: Aman Tuleyev (ER)
- Kirov Oblast: Vladimir Shaklein (ER)
- Kostroma Oblast: Viktor Shershunov (CPRF)
- Kurgan Oblast: Oleg Bogomolov (ER)
- Kursk Oblast: Aleksandr Mikhailov (ER)
- Leningrad Oblast: Valery Serdyukov (ER)
- Lipetsk Oblast: Oleg Korolyov (ER)
- Magadan Oblast: Nikolai Dudov (ER)
- Moscow Oblast: Boris Gromov (ER)
- Murmansk Oblast: Yuri Yevdokimov (ER)
- Nizhny Novgorod Oblast: Valery Shantsev (ER)
- Novgorod Oblast: Mikhail Prusak (ER)
- Novosibirsk Oblast: Viktor Tolokonsky (ER)
- Omsk Oblast: Leonid Polezhayev (ER)
- Orenburg Oblast: Alexey Chernyshev (ER)
- Oryol Oblast: Yegor Stroyev (ER)
- Penza Oblast: Vasily Bochkarev (ER)
- Pskov Oblast: Mikhail Kuznetsov (ER)
- Rostov Oblast: Vladimir Chub (ER)
- Ryazan Oblast: Georgy Shpak (ER)
- Sakhalin Oblast: Ivan Malakhov (ER)
- Samara Oblast: Konstantin Titov (ER)
- Saratov Oblast: Pavel Ipatov (ER)
- Smolensk Oblast: Viktor Maslov (ER)
- Tambov Oblast: Oleg Betin (ER)
- Tomsk Oblast: Viktor Kress (ER)
- Tula Oblast: Vyacheslav Dudka (ER)
- Tver Oblast: Dmitry Zelenin (ER)
- Tyumen Oblast: Vladimir Yakushev (ER)
- Ulyanovsk Oblast: Sergey Morozov (ER)
- Vladimir Oblast: Nikolay Vinogradov (CPRF)
- Volgograd Oblast: Nikolai Maksyuta (CPRF, until into his United Russia shift)
- Vologda Oblast: Vyacheslav Pozgalyov (ER)
- Voronezh Oblast: Vladimir Kulakov (ER)
- Yaroslavl Oblast: Anatoly Lisitsyn (ER)
- Jewish Autonomous Oblast: Nikolay Volkov (ER)

== Events ==
- January 2–5 - Gimry fighting
- February 20 – Sukhoi, Tupolev, Ilyushin, Yakovlev, Irkut, Mikoyan, six aircraft brand merged, United Aircraft Corporation has business start.
- July 4 - 2006 Avtury ambush
- September 11 - 2006 Vladikavkaz Mi-8 crash
- September 13 - Ingush–Chechen fratricide incident
- September 15 - Minister of Health Mikhail Zurabov and Deputy Chairman of the State Duma Committee for Health Protection Nikolai Gerasimenko propose reinstating the Childless tax in Russia that it used to have until the 1990s, Due to declining birth rates.
- December 2 - The Tolmachevy Twins won the Junior Eurovision Song Contest 2006 in Bucharest, Romania

== Births ==
- 6 January – Nikita Bedrin, racing driver
- 17 January – Anastasiia Shabotova, Russian-Ukrainian figure skater
- 26 April – Kamila Valieva, figure skater
- 22 May – Daria Usacheva, figure skater
- 25 May – Maya Khromykh, figure skater

== Deaths ==
=== February ===
- February 14 — Valery Boldin, former assistant secretary to Mikhail Gorbachev (b. 1935)
- February 15 — Andrei Petrov, composer (b. 1930)
- February 17 — Yevgeny Samoylov, actor (b. 1912)
- February 21 — Gennadiy Aygi, Chuvash poet and translator (b. 1934)

=== April ===
- April 7 — Adamas Golodets, football player and manager (b. 1933)
- April 9 — Natalia Troitskaya, operatic soprano (b. 1951)
- April 11 — Sergey Tereshchenkov, cyclist (b. 1938)

=== May ===
- May 2 — Galaktion Alpaidze, military officer (b. 1916)
- May 6 — Konstantin Beskov, footballer and coach (b. 1920)
- May 10
  - Georgy Korniyenko, diplomat (b. 1925)
  - Alexander Zinoviev, philosopher, writer, sociologist and journalist (b. 1922)

=== June ===
- June 2 — Vyacheslav Klykov, sculptor and nationalist politician (b. 1939)
- June 17
  - Mikhail Lapshin, 4th Head of the Altai Republic (b. 1934)
  - Abdul-Halim Sadulayev, 4th President of the Chechen Republic of Ichkeria (b. 1966)

=== July ===
- July 6 — Yuri Matochkin, 1st Governor of Kaliningrad Oblast (b. 1931)
- July 7 — Dina Kaminskaya, lawyer and human rights activist (b. 1919)
- July 10 — Shamil Basayev, senior leader of the Chechen independence movement and Islamist militant (b. 1965)
- July 21 — Alexander Petrenko, professional basketball player (b. 1976)
- July 23 — Arkady Veprev, 1st Governor of Krasnoyarsk Krai (b. 1927)

=== August ===
- August 5 — Aron Gurevich, medievalist historian (b. 1924)
- August 11 — Yevgeny Sinyayev, sprinter (b. 1948)
- August 24 — Viktor Pavlov, stage and film actor (b. 1940)
- August 30 — Igor Kio, illusionist (b. 1944)

=== September ===
- September 9 — Arkady Volsky, politician and businessman (b. 1932)
- September 14 — Andrey Kozlov, First Deputy Chairman of the Central Bank of Russia (b. 1965)
- September 18 — Boris Snetkov, army general (b. 1925)
- September 20 — Ivan Shabunin, 1st Governor of Volgograd Oblast (b. 1935)

=== October ===
- October 7 — Anna Politkovskaya, journalist (b. 1958)
- October 16 — Anatoly Voronin, business chief of TASS news agency (b. 1951)

=== November ===
- November 7 — Lyudmila Buldakova, volleyball player (b. 1938)
- November 10 — Igor Sergeyev, 4th Minister of Defence of the Russian Federation (b. 1938)
- November 16 — Yuri Levada, sociologist and pollster (b. 1930)
- November 18 — Movladi Baisarov, Chechen warlord and former FSB special-task unit commander (b. 1966)
- November 23 — Alexander Litvinenko, spy and critic of Vladimir Putin (b. 1962)
- November 28 — Lyubov Polishchuk, actress (b. 1949)

=== December ===
- December 5 — David Bronstein, chess player (b. 1924)
- December 22
  - Galina Ustvolskaya, composer (b. 1919)
  - Elena Mukhina, gymnast (b. 1960)

== See also ==
- List of Russian films of 2006
