= 1923 in the Soviet Union =

- Decades: 1920s; 1930s; 1940s
- See also: History of the Soviet Union; List of years in the Soviet Union

The following lists events that happened during 1923 in the Union of Soviet Socialist Republics.

== Incumbents ==
- General Secretary of the Communist Party of the Soviet Union – Joseph Stalin
- Chairman of the Central Executive Committee of the Congress of Soviets – Mikhail Kalinin
- Chairman of the Council of People's Commissars of the Soviet Union – Vladimir Lenin

== Events ==
=== April ===
- 17–25 April – 12th Congress of the Russian Communist Party (Bolsheviks)

=== June ===
- 16 June – The Yakut Revolt ends with the defeat of the White Army.

=== October ===
- 15 October – The Declaration of 46 is sent.

== Births ==
- January 9 — Eduard Kolmanovsky, People's Artist of the USSR (d. 1994)
- January 13 — Daniil Shafran, cellist (d. 1997)
- January 15 — Yevgeny Vesnik, actor (d. 2009)
- January 27 — Vladimir Aleksenko, Air force general (d. 1995)
- January 30 — Leonid Gaidai, comedy film director, screenwriter and actor (d. 1993)
- February 7 — Grigory Romanov, 9th First Secretary of the Leningrad Regional Committee of the Communist Party of the Soviet Union (d. 2008)
- April 3 — Lev Zaykov, 10th First Secretary of the Leningrad Regional Committee of the Communist Party of the Soviet Union (d. 2002)
- April 27 — Viktor Chebrikov, 6th Chairman of the Committee for State Security (d. 1999)
- April 28 — Zarifa Aliyeva, ophthalmologist (d. 1985)
- May 5 — Sergey Akhromeyev, 8th Chief of the General Staff of the Soviet Armed Forces (d. 1991)
- May 10 — Heydar Aliyev, 3rd President of Azerbaijan (d. 2003)
- July 13 — Mikhail Pugovkin, comic actor (d. 2008)
- July 28 — Vladimir Basov, actor, film director and screenwriter (d. 1987)
- August 11 — Maxim Grabovenko, Hero of the Soviet Union (d. 1980)
- September 6 — Aleksandr Babaev, fighter pilot (d. 1985)
- September 11 — Grigory Baklanov, writer (d. 2009)
- September 13 — Zoya Kosmodemyanskaya, Hero of the Soviet Union (d. 1941)
- September 20 — Aleksandr Koldunov, flying ace during WWII (d. 1992)
- September 26 — Aleksandr Alov, film director (d. 1983)
- September 29 — Aleksei Filippov, mathematician (d. 2006)
- October 18 — Pyotr Lushev, army general (d. 1997)
- October 25 — Mikhail Mikhin, flying ace (d. 2007)
- October 31 — Ivan Otmakhov, Hero of the Soviet Union (d. 1945)
- November 6 — Aleksandra Chudina, athlete (d. 1990)
- November 9 — Viktor Turbin, Hero of the Soviet Union (d. 1944)
- November 11 — Isaac Trachtenberg, Hygienist (d. 2023)
- November 22 — Yury Nikandrov, Olympic shooter (d. 2018)
- November 23 — Mikhail Zaitsev, general of the Soviet Army (d. 2009)
- November 29 — Inna Zubkovskaya, ballerina (d. 2001)
- December 2 — Alexander Yakovlev, politician, diplomat and historian (d. 2005)
- December 14 — Akhsarbek Abaev, Hero of the Soviet Union (d. 1982)
- December 15 — Valentin Varennikov, general and politician (d. 2009)

== See also ==
- 1923 in fine arts of the Soviet Union
- List of Soviet films of 1923
