= Bondarevsky =

Bondarevsky, feminine: Bondarevskaya is a Russian surname. Polish equivalent: Bondarewski. Notable people with the surname include:

- Grigoriy Lvovitch Bondarevsky
- Igor Bondarevsky
