= 1983 in the Soviet Union =

- Decades: 1960s; 1970s; 1980s; 1990s
- See also: History of the Soviet Union; List of years in the Soviet Union

== Incumbents ==
- Communist Party Leader - Yuri Andropov, General Secretary of the Communist Party of the Soviet Union
- Head of State -
  1. Vasili Kuznetsov, Acting Chairman of the Presidium of the Supreme Soviet of the Soviet Union
  2. Yuri Andropov, Chairman of the Presidium of the Supreme Soviet of the Soviet Union
- Premier - Nikolai Tikhonov, Chairman of the Council of Ministers of the Soviet Union
