= 1984 in the Soviet Union =

- Decades: 1960s; 1970s; 1980s; 1990s
- See also: History of the Soviet Union; List of years in the Soviet Union

== Incumbents ==
- Communist Party Leader -
  1. Yuri Andropov, General Secretary of the Communist Party of the Soviet Union
  2. Konstantin Chernenko, General Secretary of the Communist Party of the Soviet Union
- Head of State -
  1. Yuri Andropov, Chairman of the Presidium of the Supreme Soviet of the Soviet Union
  2. Vasili Kuznetsov, Acting Chairman of the Presidium of the Supreme Soviet of the Soviet Union
  3. Konstantin Chernenko, Chairman of the Presidium of the Supreme Soviet of the Soviet Union
- Premier - Nikolai Tikhonov, Chairman of the Council of Ministers of the Soviet Union
