= 1923 in fine arts of the Soviet Union =

The year 1923 was marked by many events that left an imprint on the history of Soviet and Russian Fine Arts.

== Events ==
- January 8 — Exhibition of Society of the «Artists of the Moscow School» was opened in Mikhailova's Art Salon in Moscow. The participants were 43 artists including Boris Ioganson, Vasily Meshkov, and others. Exhibited 313 art works.
- In Petrograd at the Museum of Artistic Culture was founded State Institute of Artistic Culture. Its director was appointed Kazimir Malevich.
- September 16 — «The Exhibition of 16 Artists» was opened in Petrograd in the Museum of City (former Anichkov Palace). The participants were Grigory Bobrovsky, Mikhail Bobyshov, Isaak Brodsky, Vsevolod Voinov, Nikolai Dormidontov, Nikolai Radlov, Arcady Rylov, Pavel Shillibgovsky, and others.
- Exhibition of paintings by Petrograd artists of all artistic directions for 5-year period of 1918-1923 was opened in the Academy of Arts. Exhibited 1621 art works of 263 artists. The participants were Mikhail Avilov, Alexandre Benois, Mstislav Dobuzhinsky, Mikhail Bobyshov, Isaak Brodsky, Pavel Filonov, Rudolf Frentz, Vsevolod Voinov, Nikolai Dormidontov, Kuzma Petrov-Vodkin, Nikolai Radlov, Arcady Rylov, Alexander Savinov, Alexander Samokhvalov, Pavel Shillibgovsky, and other important Russian artists.

== Births ==
- April 5 — Mikhail Kaneev (Russian: Канеев Михаил Александрович), Russian soviet painter, Honored Art worker of the Russian Federation (died 1983).
- June 5 — Yuri Podlasky (Russian: Подляский Юрий Станиславович), Russian soviet painter, Honored Art worker of the Russian Federation, People's Artist of the RSFSR (died 1987).

== See also ==
- List of Russian artists
- List of painters of Leningrad Union of Artists
- Saint Petersburg Union of Artists
- Russian culture
- 1923 in the Soviet Union

== Sources ==
- Каталог выставки картин художников Петрограда всех направлений за 5-летний период деятельности. 1918— 1923 гг. Пг., Академия художеств, 1923.
- Выставка картин «шестнадцати». Пг., 1923.
- Каталог выставки картин Общества художников Московской школы. М., ОХМШ, 1923.
- Artists of Peoples of the USSR. Biobibliography Dictionary. Vol. 1. Moscow, Iskusstvo, 1970.
- Artists of Peoples of the USSR. Biobibliography Dictionary. Vol. 2. Moscow, Iskusstvo, 1972.
- Directory of Members of Union of Artists of USSR. Volume 1,2. Moscow, Soviet Artist Edition, 1979.
- Directory of Members of the Leningrad branch of the Union of Artists of Russian Federation. Leningrad, Khudozhnik RSFSR, 1980.
- Artists of Peoples of the USSR. Biobibliography Dictionary. Vol. 4 Book 1. Moscow, Iskusstvo, 1983.
- Directory of Members of the Leningrad branch of the Union of Artists of Russian Federation. - Leningrad: Khudozhnik RSFSR, 1987.
- Персональные и групповые выставки советских художников. 1917-1947 гг. М., Советский художник, 1989.
- Artists of peoples of the USSR. Biobibliography Dictionary. Vol. 4 Book 2. - Saint Petersburg: Academic project humanitarian agency, 1995.
- Link of Times: 1932 - 1997. Artists - Members of Saint Petersburg Union of Artists of Russia. Exhibition catalogue. - Saint Petersburg: Manezh Central Exhibition Hall, 1997.
- Matthew C. Bown. Dictionary of 20th Century Russian and Soviet Painters 1900-1980s. - London: Izomar, 1998.
- Vern G. Swanson. Soviet Impressionism. - Woodbridge, England: Antique Collectors' Club, 2001.
- Время перемен. Искусство 1960—1985 в Советском Союзе. СПб., Государственный Русский музей, 2006.
- Sergei V. Ivanov. Unknown Socialist Realism. The Leningrad School. - Saint-Petersburg: NP-Print Edition, 2007. - ISBN 5-901724-21-6, ISBN 978-5-901724-21-7.
- Anniversary Directory graduates of Saint Petersburg State Academic Institute of Painting, Sculpture, and Architecture named after Ilya Repin, Russian Academy of Arts. 1915 - 2005. - Saint Petersburg: Pervotsvet Publishing House, 2007.
