= Repression in the Soviet Union =

Repression in the Soviet Union was an ongoing characteristic of the state throughout the history of the Soviet Union, characterized by restricting the freedoms of the common man for the benefit of the communist state, albeit through a variety of means. Millions of the proletariat class experienced some form of repression from the state, stemming back to the October Revolution and the nature of totalitarianism. Repression culminated during the Stalin era, and marginally receded in the period after amidst De-Stalinization, but continued throughout the Soviet Union's existence up until late in the rule of Mikhail Gorbachev, the last leader of the Soviet Union.

== Types ==
There were many forms of repression in the Soviet Union carried out by the Soviet government and the ruling Communist Party.

=== Political repression ===
Political repression was enacted by the Soviet Union, especially during the rule of Stalin, in which he and the state sought to deter any and all political opponents and "undesirables". The latter term was limited not just to undesirable thought, but undesirable ethnic groups and minorities residing, often unwillingly, in the Soviet Union, who were commonly referred to as "enemies of the state". The state engaged in numerous deportations and transfers of these groups, often on the scale of entire nationalities. Other groups were forcefully migrated in the opposite direction in an effort to replace those affected by mass ethnic cleansing.

Political repression by the state saw the uprising of multiple rebellions, often crushed with overwhelming force and repression, though these rebellions and revolutions are what ultimately led to the Union's collapse.

=== Economic repression ===
Economic repression and their causal policies was the root cause of millions of deaths, often through delegating all power and thought to the state, who engaged in mass collectivization of all property and resources, and, in futile attempts to stimulate production, caused multiple man-made mass famines, under which millions suffered. This is often synonymous with the Holodomor, a Soviet famine that killed millions of Ukrainians.

=== Ideological repression ===
Ideological repression by the state and their correlating policies engaged in efforts to shape the worldview of the people, while simultaneously deterring any unconforming ideologies. This was enacted through a variety of means, including censorship of literature, film, images, and general control over information.

== See also ==
- Outline of the Soviet Union
