= 1979 in the Soviet Union =

- Decades: 1950s; 1960s; 1970s; 1980s; 1990s
- See also: History of the Soviet Union; List of years in the Soviet Union

The following lists events that happened during 1979 in the Union of Soviet Socialist Republics.

== Incumbents ==
- General Secretary of the Communist Party of the Soviet Union: Leonid Brezhnev (1964–1982)
- Premier of the Soviet Union: Alexei Kosygin (1964–1980)

== Events ==
- 1979 Soviet economic reform
- June 18 - SALT II Treaty
- September 3 - Aeroflot Flight A-513
- December 25 - start of Soviet–Afghan War

== Births ==
- 19 January – Svetlana Khorkina, Russian artistic gymnast
- 22 January – Olga Dolzhykova, Ukrainian-Norwegian chess player and educator.
- 26 January - Artem Datsyshyn, Ukrainian ballet dancer (d. 2022)
- 1 February - Mikhail Rudkovskiy, former Russian professional football player
- 10 April - Yelena Podkaminskaya, Russian actress
- 30 July - Denis Churkin, former Russian professional football player

== Deaths ==
- February 6 — Issa Pliyev, military commander (b. 1903)
- March 19 — Iskhak Razzakov, 4th First Secretary of the Communist Party of Kirghizia (b. 1910)
- April 16 — Anatoly Kharlampiyev, founder of sambo (b. 1906)
- April 19 — Aleksandra Troitskaya, microbiologist-leprologist (b. 1896)
- April 27 — Nikolai Vinogradov, navy officer (b. 1905)
- May 7 — Aleksei Smirnov, actor (b. 1920)
- July 1 — Vsevolod Bobrov, athlete (b. 1922)
- July 2 — Larisa Shepitko, film director and screenwriter (b. 1938)
- August 12 — Joseph Serebriany, painter and stage decorator (b. 1907)
- September 25 — Yury Kovalyov, Soviet footballer (b. 1934)
- December 16 — Vagif Mustafazadeh, jazz pianist and composer (b. 1940)

== See also ==
- 1979 in fine arts of the Soviet Union
- List of Soviet films of 1979
