= 1934 in fine arts of the Soviet Union =

The year 1934 was marked by many events that left an imprint on the history of Soviet and Russian Fine Arts.

== Events ==
- Exhibition named «Women in Socialist construction» was opened in March in the Russian museum in Leningrad. The participants were Isaak Brodsky, Piotr Buchkin, Kazimir Malevich, Victoria Belakovskaya, Alexander Lubimov, Alexander Samokhvalov, Vladimir Malagis, Yaroslav Nikolaev, Konstantin Rudakov, and other contemporary soviet artists.
- Isaak Brodsky, a pupil of Ilya Repin, has been appointed director of the All-Russian Academy of Arts and the Leningrad Institute of Painting, Sculpture and Architecture (since 1944 named after Ilya Repin).
- The Secondary Art School was created under the Leningrad Institute of Painting, Sculpture and Architecture.
- Retrospective Exhibition of works by Honored Artist of the RSFSR Isaak Brodsky was opened in Moscow and Leningrad.
- Exhibition named «Leningrad in the image of contemporary artists» was opened in November in Leningrad. The participants were Anna Ostroumova-Lebedeva, Vladimir Konashevich, Elizaveta Kruglikova, Victor Proshkin, Vasily Vikulov, and other contemporary Leningrad artists.

== Births ==
- January 10 — Olga Yefimova (Russian: Ефимова Ольга Александровна), Russian Soviet painter (died 1994).

== Deaths ==
- July 15 — Antonina Rzhevskaya (Russian: Ржевская Антонина Леонардовна), Russian painter (born 1861).
- October 14 — Mikhail Matyushin (Russian: Матюшин Михаил Васильевич), Russian artist and art educator (born 1861).
- November 27 — Mitrofan Grekov (Russian: Греков Митрофан Борисович), Russian and Soviet battle painter (born 1882)

== Gallery ==
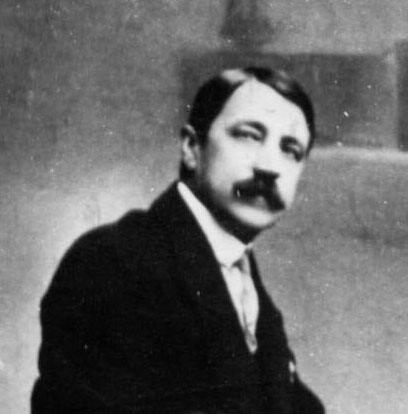
Mikhail Matyushin

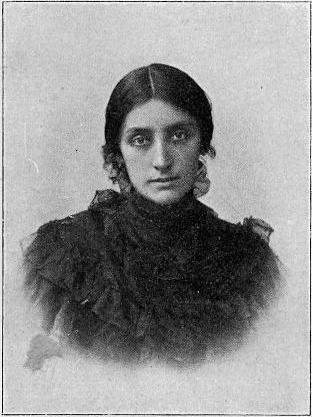
Antonina Rzhevskaya

== See also ==
- List of Russian artists
- List of painters of Leningrad Union of Artists
- Saint Petersburg Union of Artists
- Russian culture
- 1934 in the Soviet Union

== Sources ==
- Выставка «Женщина в социалистическом строительстве». Живопись, скульптура, графика. Л., ГРМ, 1934.
- Artists of Peoples of the USSR. Biobibliography Dictionary. Vol. 1. Moscow, Iskusstvo, 1970.
- Artists of Peoples of the USSR. Biobibliography Dictionary. Vol. 2. Moscow, Iskusstvo, 1972.
- Directory of Members of Union of Artists of USSR. Volume 1,2. Moscow, Soviet Artist Edition, 1979.
- Directory of Members of the Leningrad branch of the Union of Artists of Russian Federation. Leningrad, Khudozhnik RSFSR, 1980.
- Artists of Peoples of the USSR. Biobibliography Dictionary. Vol. 4 Book 1. Moscow, Iskusstvo, 1983.
- Directory of Members of the Leningrad branch of the Union of Artists of Russian Federation. Leningrad, Khudozhnik RSFSR, 1987.
- Персональные и групповые выставки советских художников. 1917-1947 гг. М., Советский художник, 1989.
- Artists of peoples of the USSR. Biobibliography Dictionary. Vol. 4 Book 2. Saint Petersburg: Academic project humanitarian agency, 1995.
- Link of Times: 1932 - 1997. Artists - Members of Saint Petersburg Union of Artists of Russia. Exhibition catalogue. Saint Petersburg, Manezh Central Exhibition Hall, 1997.
- Matthew C. Bown. Dictionary of 20th Century Russian and Soviet Painters 1900-1980s. London, Izomar, 1998.
- Vern G. Swanson. Soviet Impressionism. - Woodbridge, England: Antique Collectors' Club, 2001.
- Sergei V. Ivanov. Unknown Socialist Realism. The Leningrad School. Saint-Petersburg, NP-Print Edition, 2007. ISBN 5901724216, ISBN 9785901724217.
- Anniversary Directory graduates of Saint Petersburg State Academic Institute of Painting, Sculpture, and Architecture named after Ilya Repin, Russian Academy of Arts. 1915 - 2005. Saint Petersburg, Pervotsvet Publishing House, 2007.
