= 1938 in fine arts of the Soviet Union =

The year 1938 was marked by many events that left an imprint on the history of Soviet and Russian Fine Arts.

== Events ==
- January 20 — Exhibition of Paintings, Sculpture, and Graphics, made under the contracts of 1937 year, was opened in Moscow. Exhibited 153 works of 117 artists. The participants were Vasily Baksheev, Nikolay Krymov, Pavel Kuznetsov, Alexander Kuprin, Aristarkh Lentulov, Mikhail Matorin, Ilya Mashkov, Georgy Nissky, Alexander Osmerkin, Piotr Petrovichev, Piotr Pokarzhevsky, Pavel Radimov, Martiros Saryan, Leonard Turzhansky, Nadezhda Udaltsova, and other important Soviet artists.
- May 6 — Exhibition named «20 Years of Workers and Peasants Red Army and Navy» was opened in Moscow. Exhibited 451 works of 236 artists. The participants were Vasily Baksheev, Piotr Belousov, Isaak Brodsky, Piotr Buchkin, Alexander Deyneka, Nikolai Dormidontov, Rudolf Frentz, Alexander Lubimov, Yuri Neprintsev, Vladimir Serov, Konstantin Yuon, and other important Soviet artists.

== Births ==
- January 16 — Victor Abramian (Russian: Абрамян Виктор Ашотович), Russian Soviet painter (died 2008).
- August 1 — Konstantin Ivanov (Russian: Иванов Константин Кириллович), Russian Soviet painter.

== Deaths ==
- February 5 — Sergey Vynogradov (Russian: Виноградов Сергей Арсеньевич), Russian painter (born 1869).
- February 26 — Aleksandr Drevin (Russian: Древин Александр Давыдович), Russian painter (born 1869).
- May 12 — Alexandre Jacovleff (Russian: Яковлев Александр Евгеньевич), Russian painter (born 1887).
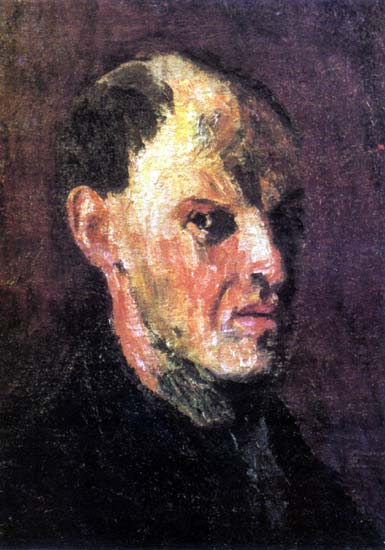
Aleksandr Drevin

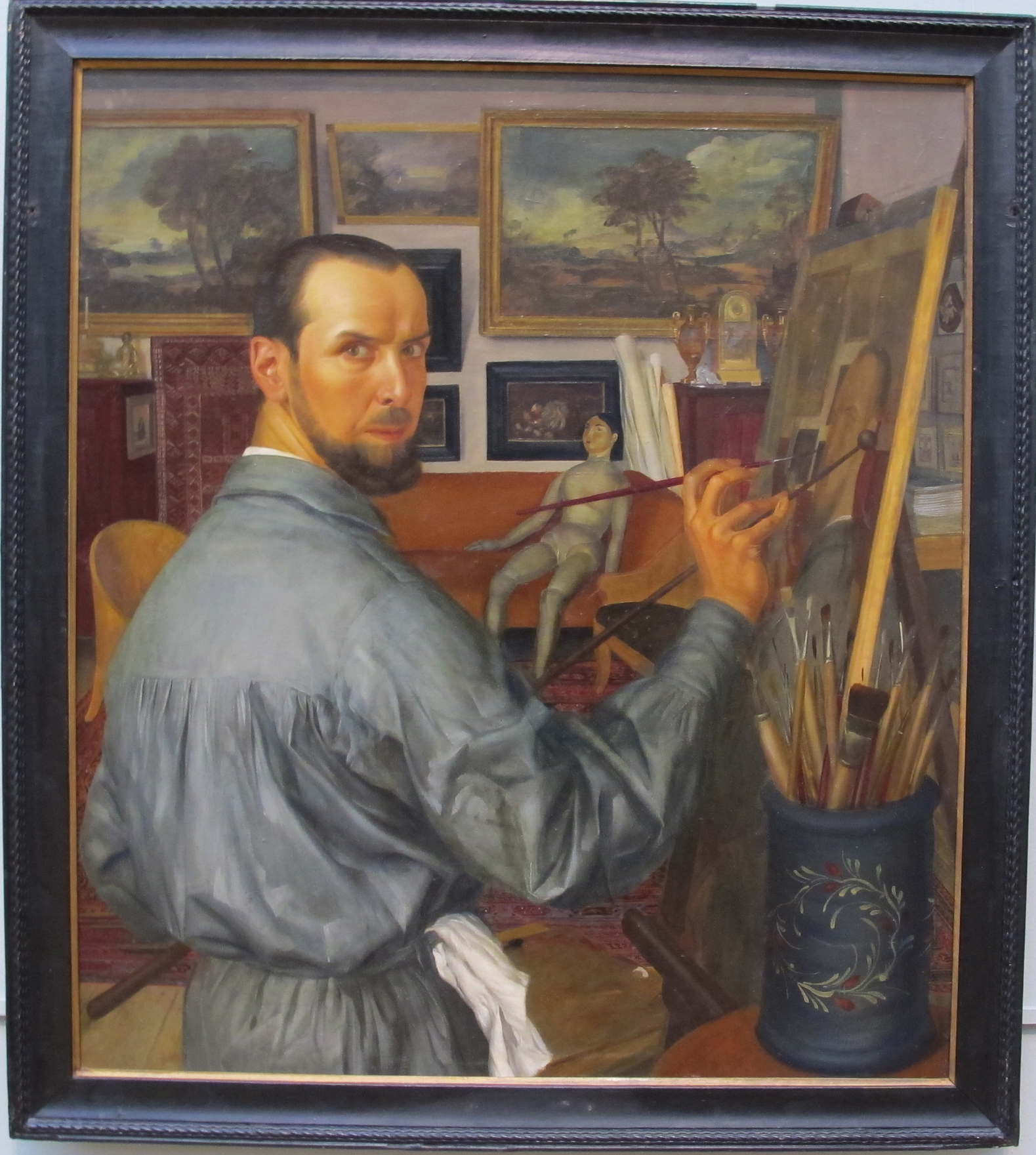
Alexandre Jacovleff

== See also ==
- List of Russian artists
- List of painters of Leningrad Union of Artists
- Saint Petersburg Union of Artists
- Russian culture
- 1938 in the Soviet Union

== Sources ==
- Художественная выставка «ХХ лет РККА и Военно-морского флота». Каталог. М., Военгиз, 1938.
- Выставка живописи, скульптуры и графики художников-контрактантов. 1937 г. Каталог. М., Искусство, 1938.
- С. Коровкевич. Молодые живописцы Академии// Советское искусство, 24 ноября 1938.
- Выставка кружков повышения квалификации художников Ленизо. Л., 1938.
- Каталог выставки женщин-художников в помещении клуба театральных работников. Л., 1938.
- Artists of Peoples of the USSR. Biobibliography Dictionary. Vol. 1. Moscow, Iskusstvo, 1970.
- Artists of Peoples of the USSR. Biobibliography Dictionary. Vol. 2. Moscow, Iskusstvo, 1972.
- Directory of Members of Union of Artists of USSR. Volume 1,2. Moscow, Soviet Artist Edition, 1979.
- Directory of Members of the Leningrad branch of the Union of Artists of Russian Federation. Leningrad, Khudozhnik RSFSR, 1980.
- Artists of Peoples of the USSR. Biobibliography Dictionary. Vol. 4 Book 1. Moscow, Iskusstvo, 1983.
- Directory of Members of the Leningrad branch of the Union of Artists of Russian Federation. Leningrad, Khudozhnik RSFSR, 1987.
- Персональные и групповые выставки советских художников. 1917-1947 гг. М., Советский художник, 1989.
- Artists of peoples of the USSR. Biobibliography Dictionary. Vol. 4 Book 2. Saint Petersburg: Academic project humanitarian agency, 1995.
- Link of Times: 1932 - 1997. Artists - Members of Saint Petersburg Union of Artists of Russia. Exhibition catalogue. Saint Petersburg, Manezh Central Exhibition Hall, 1997.
- Matthew C. Bown. Dictionary of 20th Century Russian and Soviet Painters 1900-1980s. London, Izomar, 1998.
- Vern G. Swanson. Soviet Impressionism. - Woodbridge, England: Antique Collectors' Club, 2001.
- Sergei V. Ivanov. Unknown Socialist Realism. The Leningrad School. Saint-Petersburg, NP-Print Edition, 2007. ISBN 5901724216, ISBN 9785901724217.
- Anniversary Directory graduates of Saint Petersburg State Academic Institute of Painting, Sculpture, and Architecture named after Ilya Repin, Russian Academy of Arts. 1915 - 2005. Saint Petersburg, Pervotsvet Publishing House, 2007.
