= 2006 Vladikavkaz Mi-8 crash =

Aviation incident in Russia

Coordinates: 43°02′N 44°40′E

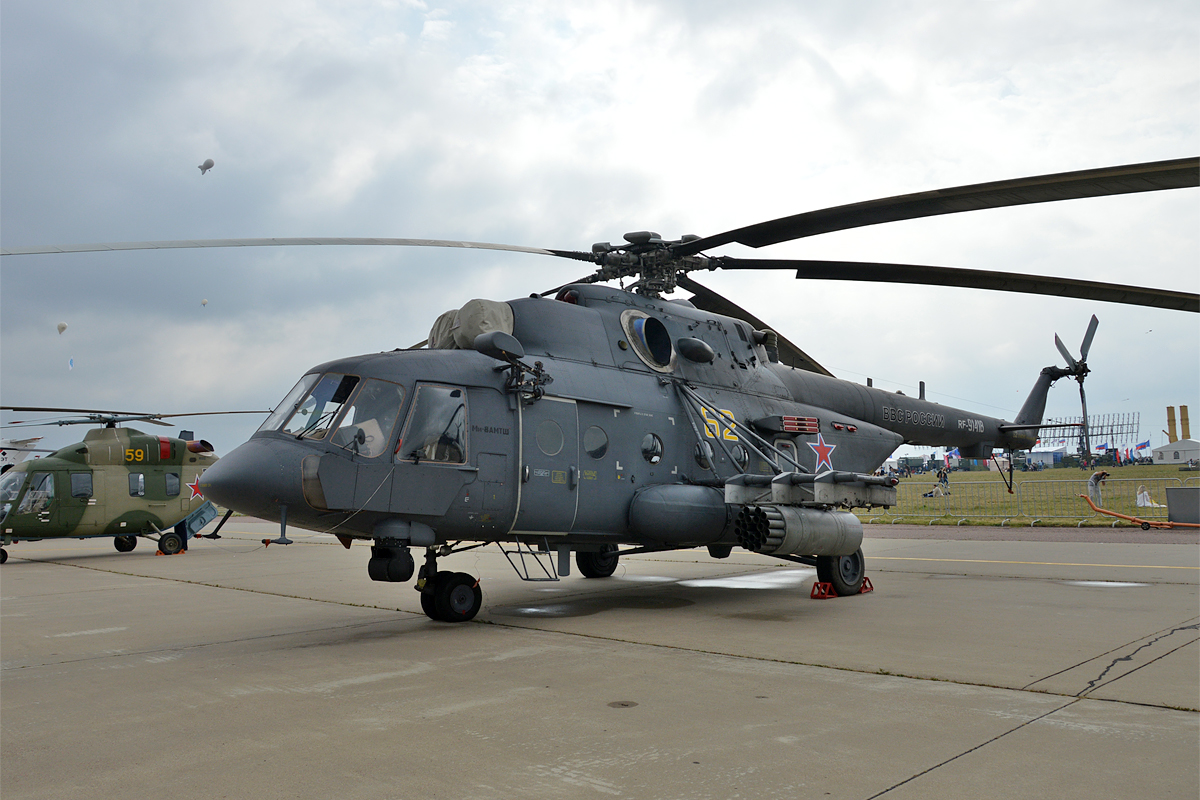
- A Russian Mil-Mi-8 similar to the aircraft involved in the incident.

Occurrence
- Date: 11 September 2006
- Summary: Disputed (claimed shot down and suspected bad weather)
- Site: Near Vladikavkaz, North Ossetia–Alania, Russia

Aircraft
- Aircraft type: Mil Mi-8
- Operator: Russian Air Force
- Registration: Unknown
- Passengers: 12
- Crew: 3
- Fatalities: 12
- Injuries: 3
- Survivors: 3

The 2006 Russian military Mil Mi-8 crash was a helicopter crash near Vladikavkaz. The crash killed 12 Russian military men, mostly high-ranking officers, among them Lieutenant-General Pavel Yaroslavtsev, deputy chief for army logistics, Lieutenant-General Viktor Guliaev, deputy chief of army medical units, and Major-General Vladimir Sorokin.

The Islamist terrorist group Kataib al-Khoul claimed responsibility for shooting down the helicopter.
