= Viktor Turbin =

Soviet military personnel (1923–1944)

Viktor Andreevich Turbin
- Виктор Андреевич Турбин
- Born: 9 November 1923; Bobrov, Voronezh Oblast, Soviet Union
- Died: 8 August 1944 (aged 20); Białystok, Poland
- Military career
- Allegiance: Soviet Union
- Branch: Red Army
- Service years: 1941–1944
- Rank: Junior lieutenant
- Unit: 102nd Rifle Division
- Conflicts: World War II; Operation Bagration †
- Awards: Hero of the Soviet Union

Viktor Andreevich Turbin (Russian: Виктор Андреевич Турбин; 9 November 1923 – 8 August 1944) was a Red Army Junior Lieutenant and posthumous Hero of the Soviet Union. Turbin was posthumously awarded the title Hero of the Soviet Union and the Order of Lenin for his actions while leading a platoon during Operation Bagration in summer 1944. His platoon reportedly held a bridgehead on the Drut River against numerically superior German troops until the crossing of the remainder of Turbin's regiment.

== Early life ==
Turbin was born on 9 November 1923 in Bobrov in Voronezh Oblast to a working-class family. He graduated from high school in 1941.

== World War II ==
Turbin was drafted into the Red Army in December 1941. He was sent into combat in January 1942 and was wounded. After recovering, he was sent to the Ulyanovsk Military Infantry School. After graduating in August 1942, he was sent back to the front and wounded on 5 January 1943. He was also wounded on 5 February. He became a platoon commander in the 16th Rifle Regiment of the 102nd Rifle Division.

Turbin fought in Operation Bagration. On 24 June, he led his platoon into fortifications between the Dnieper and the Drut and attacked into the German trenches, reportedly personally killing 10 German soldiers. On 25 June, they continued to attack the fortifications. On 26 June, Turbin's platoon moved through the marshes and swam across the Drut. The platoon's attack reportedly took the German troops by surprise. The German troops were reportedly unable to initially offer serious resistance despite their numerical superiority. Turbin destroyed a heavy machine gun and 75mm artillery shells with a hand grenade. The German troops soon recovered from their surprise and made four counterattacks. These were repulsed by Turbin's platoon, which reportedly inflicted 200 casualties on the German troops. The platoon managed to hold the bridgehead until the rest of the regiment arrived. On 8 August, Turbin was killed during the attack on Białystok. He was buried in the village of Wilkowo near Białystok. On 24 March 1945, he was posthumously awarded the title Hero of the Soviet Union and the Order of Lenin.
