= Natalia Troitskaya =

Russian opera singer (1951–2006)

Natalia Leonidovna Troitskaya (Russian: Наталья Леонидовна Троицкая; 1951 – 9 April 2006) was a Russian operatic soprano who had a major international career during the 1980s and early 1990s. She particularly excelled in the operas of Giacomo Puccini and Giuseppe Verdi. Among her signature roles were Tatyana in Pyotr Ilyich Tchaikovsky's Eugene Onegin and the title heroines in Verdi's Aida, Puccini's Manon Lescaut, and Puccini's Tosca. She was a frequent partner of Plácido Domingo during the 1980s and also sang opposite other great artists like Montserrat Caballé, Dmitri Hvorostovsky, and Luciano Pavarotti.

== Biography ==
Born in Belgrade, Troitskaya's father was a professional violinist and her mother was a concert pianist. She studied voice for six years in Moscow and Belgrade and won singing competitions in Toulouse, Vercelli, and Barcelona. She made her professional opera debut in 1981 as Elisabetta di Valois at the Liceu, in Don Carlo, with Jaume Aragall in the title role. The same year, she sang at Liceu in the title role of Puccini's Tosca opposite Nunzio Todisco as Mario Cavaradossi and Juan Pons as Scarpia.

Troitskaya quickly became an important presence on the international opera scene. In 1982 she sang the title role of Verdi's Aida at the Opéra Royal de Wallonie and the Sferisterio Opera Festival. She then gave several performances in South America in 1982–1983. In 1984 she became a member of the Vienna State Opera, making her debut with the company that year as Aida. She remained committed to that opera house through 1991 where she was particularly admired for her portrayals of Puccini and Verdi heroines.

While working primarily in Vienna, Troitskaya appeared as a guest artist at the Opéra National de Paris (1985, Amelia in Verdi's Un ballo in maschera), the Staatsoper Stuttgart (1985, Elisabetta in Verdi's Don Carlos), the Teatro dell'Opera di Roma (1985, the title role in Francesco Cilea's Adriana Lecouvreur), the Arena di Verona Festival (1985–1986, Aida and Amelia), the Hamburg State Opera (1986–1988, Amelia, Elisabetta, Leonora in Verdi's Il trovatore, Nedda in Pagliacci, and the title heroine of Puccini's Manon Lescaut), the Royal Opera, London (1986, Tosca), the Luxor Temple (1987, Aida), the Deutsche Oper Berlin (1988–1989, Desdemona in Verdi's Otello, Leonora and Tosca), the Teatro Nacional de São Carlos (1989, Desdemona), the Bavarian State Opera ( Adriana Lecouvreur in 1984 and later on Tosca, Elisabetta, Amelia, Tosca, Mimi and Lisa), the Washington National Opera (1989, Lisa in Tchaikovsky's The Queen of Spades, and the Los Angeles Opera (1990, Elisabetta) among others.

She died in Moscow in 2006 at the age of 55 after a long bout with serious illness.

== Recordings ==
Troitskaya's audio performances included a disc in which she and the Czech Philharmonic perform the work of Josef Suk under the baton of Charles Mackerras and as a soloist on a recording of Dmitri Shostakovich's Symphony No. 13 with the Royal Concertgebouw Orchestra. Video captured of her performance with Dmitri Hvorostovsky in 1990 was released on VHS and DVD.
