= 1985 Russian Supreme Soviet election =

- 24 February 1985

All 975 seats in the Supreme Soviet
- Turnout: 99.97% (▼0.01 pp)
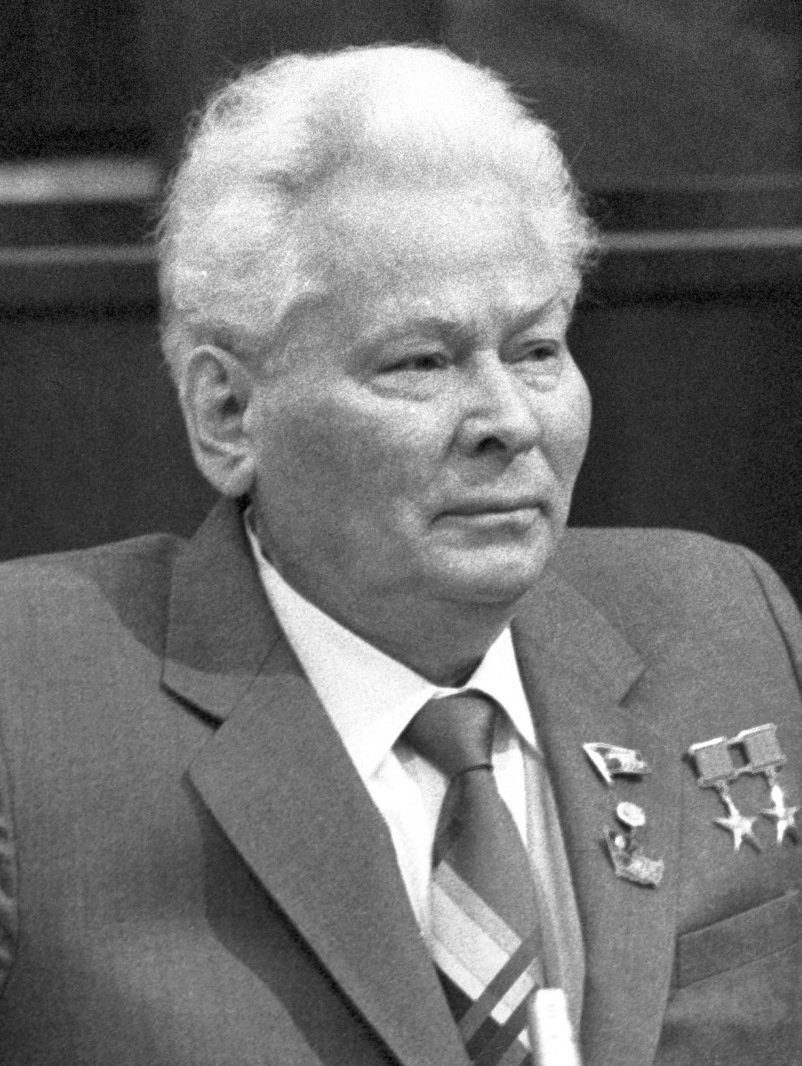
	First party	Second party
Leader	Konstantin Chernenko
Party	CPSU	Independents
Alliance	BKB	BKB
Leader since	13 February 1984
Leader's seat	Kuybyshevsky 28th (Moscow)
Last election	649 seats	325 seats
Seats won	649	326
Seat change	Steady	▲1
Chairman of the Supreme Soviet before election
Nikolai Gribachev
CPSU
Elected Chairman of the Supreme Soviet
Nikolai Gribachev
CPSU

Elections to the Supreme Soviet of the RSFSR were held on 24 February 1985, along with elections to Soviets in the rest of the Republics of the USSR.

The official turnout was 99.97%. 975 people were elected, all from the Bloc of Communists and Non-Partisans.

100% of voters in their constituency voted for the General Secretary of the Central Committee of the CPSU Konstantin Chernenko. Chernenko died two weeks later.

== Results ==
Party or alliance		Votes	%	Seats	+/–
Bloc of Communists and Non-Partisans	Communist Party of the Soviet Union	100,989,507	99.93	649	0
Bloc of Communists and Non-Partisans	Independents	100,989,507	99.93	326	+1
Against all candidates		68,689	0.07	–	–
Vacant seats				0	–1
Total		101,058,196	100.00	975	–
Valid votes		101,058,196	100.00		
Invalid/blank votes		9	0.00		
Total votes		101,058,205	100.00		
Registered voters/turnout		101,087,009	99.97		
Source: Izvestia
