= Ivan Otmakhov =

Red army lieutenant

Ivan Grigoryevich Otmakhov
- Иван Григорьевич Отмахов
- Born: 31 October 1923; Vedosnur, Sernursky District, Mari Autonomous Oblast
- Died: 23 April 1945 (aged 21)
- Military career
- Allegiance: Soviet Union
- Branch: Red Army
- Service years: 1942–1945
- Rank: Lieutenant
- Unit: 136th Rifle Division
- Conflicts: World War II; Nikopol–Krivoi Rog Offensive; Lvov-Sandomierz Offensive; East Prussian Offensive; East Pomeranian Offensive
- Awards: Hero of the Soviet Union; Order of Lenin; Order of the Red Banner; Order of the Patriotic War, 1st and 2nd class; Order of the Red Star

Ivan Grigoryevich Otmakhov (Russian: Иван Григорьевич Отмахов; 31 October 1923 – 23 April 1945) was a Red Army lieutenant and posthumous Hero of the Soviet Union. Otmakhov was awarded the title Hero of the Soviet Union and the Order of Lenin for his actions during the Battle of Danzig in March 1945.

== Early life ==
Otmakhov was born on 31 October 1923 in the village of Vedosnur in Sernursky District, Mari Autonomous Oblast to a peasant family. He was taken to Baley with his parents in 1928 and graduated from sixth grade. Otmakhov then worked at the gold fields and at the mine at the station of Priiskovaya.

== World War II ==
In March 1942, Otamkhov was drafted into the Red Army. Between August 1942 and April 1943, he fought in a unit on the Southwestern Front. Otmakhov then entered courses for junior lieutenants, graduating in November. He was sent to the front as a rifle platoon commander in the 5th Separate Guards Motor Rifle Brigade. In 1944, he joined the Communist Party of the Soviet Union. During the Nikopol–Krivoi Rog Offensive on 3 February 1944, Otmakhov led his platoon in the attack. He took a machine gun and opened fire on German troops. Together with his platoon, he was among the first to break into the German defenses. During this action, Otmakhov reportedly killed up to 10 German soldiers. For this action, he was awarded the Order of the Red Star on 7 July.

Otmakhov transferred to become a platoon commander in the 342nd Rifle Regiment of the 136th Rifle Division in March 1944. During the Lvov–Sandomierz Offensive on 15 July, his platoon repulsed 5 tank-supported counterattacks. Otmakhov then reportedly led his platoon into an attack on the Lemushev village (now in Horokhiv Raion), which the platoon captured. Otmakhov only left the battlefield when he was severely wounded. For his actions, he was recommended for the Order of Alexander Nevsky but was instead awarded the Order of the Patriotic War 2nd class on 5 August.

Otmakhov became a company commander in the regiment's 1st Rifle Battalion during the fall. In October 1944, the 136th Rifle Division was transferred to a bridgehead on the Narew near Serock. On 21 October, he led his company in the attack on the locality of Karolina in Pułtusk County and dislodged German troops from the area. During the pursuit towards the village of Shadki, the company was fired upon by German machine guns and was pinned down. Otmakhov then reportedly took a machine gun and suppressed three German firing positions. The company again advance and captured the village. Otmakhov then led his company to move forward, reaching positions on the right flank of the battalion at the village of Izbica. On 22 October, the German troops reportedly launched 13 tank-supported counterattacks. Otmakhov reportedly inspired the company by his personal example and they destroyed 2 light tanks and 3 other vehicles. Otmakhov was recommended for the Order of the Red Banner but was instead awarded the Order of the Patriotic War 1st class on 6 November.

On 14 January 1945, the division launched the Mlawo-Elbing Offensive, part of the East Prussian Offensive, from the bridgehead. During fierce fighting to break through heavily fortified German positions near the village of Stanislav, Otmakhov distinguished himself. On 15 January, during fighting to the west of Kania Góra, Otmakhov reportedly led his company in attacking the German lines multiple times. The company reportedly killed more than 50 German troops, forcing them to retreat to the next trench line. On 16 January, while breaking through German positions at the village of Nun, Otmakhov reached the German mortar battery. Despite heavy fire, he reportedly attacked the German mortar battery and personally killed more than 10 German soldiers. The mortar battery was captured by the company. For his actions, Otmakhov was awarded the Order of the Red Banner on 13 February.

In February, the division fought in the East Pomeranian Offensive. Otmakhov became the deputy commander of the regiment's 2nd Rifle Battalion. During fierce fighting in Danzig from 23 March, he distinguished himself again. During the battalion's advance toward the airfield, Otmakhov was at the front despite heavy German fire. German troops had created a strongpoint, and Otmakhov led two companies in bypassing the fortifications. Approaching from the southwestern side of the strongpoint, Otmakhov's force broke into the position and reportedly killed more than 150 German soldiers. They also captured 2 armored personnel carriers in serviceable condition. On 27 March, during the fight for Lauental, Otmakhov commanded the assault group. Through his leadership, the assault group cleared the area and cut the Noyfarvasser-Tsigankenberg highway. Several German counterattacks were launched, but they were repulsed. After repulsing a counterattack, the assault group rushed forward at the German positions. This reportedly caused the German units to retreat. While attacking across the Martwa Wisła in Danzig, Otmakhov organized the river crossing despite heavy artillery and machine gun fire. Otmakhov crossed in the first boat and landed on the beach. German troops, reportedly supported by Tiger tanks, attacked and attempted to dislodge the bridgehead. A heavy German artillery barrage hit the small bridgehead, reportedly killing all but a wounded gunner and Otmakhov. Otmakhov reportedly called in artillery fire on his own position, which caused the German troops to retreat. Otmakhov survived unhurt, but was badly wounded on 23 April during the battle for the bridgehead on the west bank of the Oder. He died of his wounds on the same day and was later buried in Pinczow. Otmakhov was posthumously awarded the title Hero of the Soviet Union and the Order of Lenin on 29 June.

== Legacy ==
A worker's settlement in Baley was named after Otmakhov. There is also a monument dedicated to him in Vedosnur.
