= Rizvan Chitigov =

Chechen brigadier general (1964–2005)

Rizvan Chitigov (Russian: Ризван Читигов)
- Born: 22 April 1964; Shali, Chechnya
- Died: 23 March 2005 (aged 40); Shali, Chechnya
- Military career
- Allegiance: Confederation of Mountain Peoples of the Caucasus: Chechen Republic of Ichkeria
- Service years: 1982-2005
- Rank: Brigadier General
- Nicknames: Amerikanets, Marine
- Commands: Marine Corps
- Conflicts: First Chechen War; Second Chechen War

Rizvan Chitigov (Amerikanets, Marine, 22 April 1964 – 23 March 2005) was a prominent Chechen rebel field commander in Shalinsky District of the Chechen Republic (Russia) until his death on 23 March 2005.

== Biography ==
Chitigov served in the Soviet Army as a tank commander. Until the late 1980s, Rezvan Chitigov was employed as a firefighter at the local district fire department.

In the early 1990s, Chitigov lived the United States. Upon his return to Chechnya, he oversaw military intelligence in the Chechen separatist government of Aslan Maskhadov. When he returned to Shali in 1994, he told compatriots that he had graduated from an elite U.S. sabotage and reconnaissance school and served on a contract basis in a U.S. Marine battalion. This earned him the aliases “Amerikanets” (the American) and “Morpekh” (the Marine). According to Kommersant, the Federal Security Service of Russia received “operational information” in 2001 that Chitigov planned to use chemical and biological weapons against federal troops, and ricin was later found in an “underground base” of his in Gudermes. This earned Chitigov his third alias, “Khimik” (the Chemist). The Shali district branch of the Interior Ministry claims Chitigov was personally involved in the murder of 50 local inhabitants, while the FSB says that the August 31, 1999 bombing of Moscow’s Manezh shopping mall, which killed one person, was carried out on his orders. The Russian FSB suspected that Chitigov had been maintaining ties with foreign intelligence services and was himself a CIA agent.

During the First Chechen War, he became the commander of the only tank unit of the Chechen fighters and gained notoriety for his extreme brutality.

Chitigov was killed on 23 March 2005 in Chechnya in the Shali district center. According to the Russian state agency RIA Novosti, Chitigov previously served in the Confederation of Mountain Peoples of the Caucasus and was "planning to use chemical and bacteriological weapons against federal forces".
