= Anatoly Voronin =

Russian journalist (1951–2006)

Anatoly Voronin (1951 – October 16, 2006) was the business chief of Russian Itar-TASS news agency. He had worked with the agency for over twenty-three years.

== Death ==
On the morning of October 16, 2006, he was found knifed to death in his flat in Central Moscow. He was due to return to work after taking a holiday, and his driver had waited for three hours outside. Eventually the driver contacted Itar-TASS officials about Voronin's disappearance. The driver and Itar-TASS officials entered his flat to find Voronin's body, amongst the scattered things in the flat. Deputy Moscow Prosecutor Alexei Grigoryev went to the scene of the murder at Voronin's flat in central Moscow. Svetlana Petrenko, spokeswoman for the Prosecutor's Office, has said, "Most likely, Grigoryev believes, is that the killing was linked to a personal dispute and therefore investigators are studying a group of the deceased acquaintances. This version is being looked at very closely."

== See also ==
- Itar-Tass
