= Andrzej Bondarewski =

Polish lawyer and politician (1928 - 2011)

Deputy of the Contract Sejm
- In office 1989 – 1991
- Constituency: 073 Piotrków Trybunalski

Personal details
- Born: Andrzej Mieczysław Bondarewski; 21 February 1938 Warsaw, Second Polish Republic
- Died: 24 January 2011 (aged 72) Otwock, Poland
- Party: Alliance of Democrats

Andrzej Bondarewski (1928–2011) was a Polish lawyer and politician, M.P.

== Decorations ==
- 1988: Knight's Cross of the Order of Polonia Restituta
- 1980: Gold Cross of Merit (Poland)
- Bronze Cross of Merit (Poland)
