= Vasily Meshkov =

- Василий Мешков
- Born: 6 January 1868; Yelets, Oryol Governorate, Russian Empire
- Died: 26 November 1946 (aged 78); Moscow, RSFSR, Soviet Union
- Resting place: Novodevichy Cemetery
- Movement: Socialist realism

Vasily Nikitich Meshkov (Russian: Василий Никитич Мешков; December 25, 1867 [January 6, 1868], Yelets – November 26, 1946, Moscow) was a Russian and Soviet painter and graphic artist. He was a Doctor of Art History and a professor at the All-Russian Academy of Arts. He held the title of People's Artist of the RSFSR (1943) and Honored Artist of the RSFSR (April 7, 1932).

== Biography ==
Born into a family of a baker, he was orphaned at an early age. From childhood, he earned his living by painting icons at the Zadonsky Monastery.

Article for the 10th anniversary of the Moscow Association of Artists. Portraits of Sintsov, Meshkov, Shesternin, and N.S. Ulyanov. 1903. He studied at the Moscow School of Painting, Sculpture, and Architecture (1882–1889), where, under the guidance of Evgraf Semenovich Sorokin, Illarion Pryanishnikov, and especially Vasily Polenov, he developed as a realist artist. He then studied at the St. Petersburg Academy of Arts (1889–1890). He was a member of the Moscow Association of Artists (since 1893) and the Association of Artists of Revolutionary Russia (since 1922). He taught at his own school of painting and drawing in Moscow (1892–1917) and at the Institute of Painting, Sculpture, and Architecture in Leningrad (1937–1940).

Meshkov painted genre scenes in the spirit of the late Peredvizhniki (Wanderers) movement (primarily in the 1890s), landscapes, and portraits. In the early 1890s, in his hometown of Yelets, he began his career as a portraitist. Meshkov masterfully conveyed individual psychological traits, revealing their social makeup. The paintings "Portrait of the Yelets Abbess" and "The Curious Man" created here are housed in the regional museum. He also painted "Self-Portrait", portraits of his wife E.K. Meshkova, the surgeon P.I. Postnikov, A.S. Perfilyeva, Feodor Chaliapin, and others.

Meshkov simultaneously worked as a genre painter ("Dentistry", 1891, "Evening Serenade", 1893, "The Blinded Artist", 1898, and other paintings) and as a creator of landscapes marked by subtle observation ("Getting Cold", 1898, and others).

Since 1917, Meshkov's art has experienced a new surge in popularity, filling it with new content. He produced a number of portraits (of Pavel Chistyakov and Leonid Sobinov, 1917) and sketches. Meshkov devoted particular attention to portraits of Communist Party figures. He painted powerful portraits of Semyon Budyonny and Vyacheslav Menzhinsky (both 1927). In the early 1930s, he worked on portraits of Joseph Stalin, Felix Dzerzhinsky, and Kliment Voroshilov. His portraits of Mikhail Kalinin (1929) and his mother M. V. Kalinina (1930) are distinguished by profound truthfulness and warmth. In 1924, Meshkov painted a portrait of Clara Zetkin, and in the 1930s, he created portraits of Karl Marx and Friedrich Engels. Meshkov frequently painted images of Soviet cultural figures (portraits of Vasily Kachalov and Ivan Moskvin, both 1932), workers, and Red Army soldiers. The artist's works occupy a worthy place in major museums and art galleries in Russia and abroad. More than ten of his works are housed in the Yelets and Lipetsk Regional History Museums.

Meshkov played an important role in the history of Soviet art as a talented teacher. His students included Ivan Blokhin, Nikolai Terpsikhorov, Boris Yakovlev, Vasily Yakovlev, Pyotr Shukhmin and the artist's son, the landscape painter Vasily Vasilyevich Meshkov (1893–1963).

Meshkov is buried in Moscow at the Novodevichy Cemetery (section 4).

In 1960, a new street in Lipetsk was named after the artist. There is also a Meshkova Street in Yelets.
