= Georgy Korniyenko =

Soviet diplomat

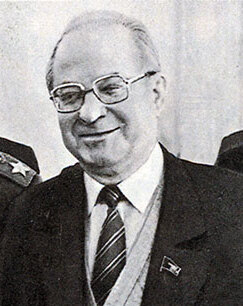
Korniyenko in 1985

Georgy Markovich Korniyenko (also Kornienko; Russian: Гео́ргий Ма́ркович Корние́нко, 13 February 1925 – 10 May 2006) was a Soviet diplomat.

He joined the Soviet Ministry of Foreign Affairs in 1949 and later became an attaché at the Soviet Embassy in Washington, D.C. during the 1962 Cuban Missile Crisis. Then in 1964 he was assigned to head the Soviet Foreign Ministry's American desk. He became a deputy to Soviet Foreign Minister Andrei Gromyko in 1975 and the first deputy two years later.

He was instrumental in developing Soviet policy toward the United States and setting the agenda for U.S.-Soviet disarmament talks in the 1970s and the 1980s. He is known to have clashed on occasion with other members of the Soviet elite on foreign policy issues. In 1983, when a Soviet fighter shot down a Korean airliner intruding into Soviet airspace, killing all 269 people on board, Korniyenko opposed the official Kremlin course on the incident and futilely urged the Communist Party leadership to release more information about it to avoid international isolation.

He was one of the few Soviet leaders who opposed the 1979 Soviet invasion of Afghanistan. He was awarded the Hero of Socialist Labour in 1985, one of the highest awards in the Soviet Union. He died after a lengthy unspecified illness.
