= 1956 in the Soviet Union =

- Decades: 1930s; 1940s; 1950s; 1960s; 1970s
- See also: History of the Soviet Union; List of years in the Soviet Union

The following lists events that happened during 1956 in the Union of Soviet Socialist Republics.

== Incumbents ==
- First Secretary of the Communist Party of the Soviet Union – Nikita Khrushchev
- Chairman of the Presidium of the Supreme Soviet of the Soviet Union – Kliment Voroshilov
- Chairman of the Council of Ministers of the Soviet Union – Nikolai Bulganin

== Events ==
=== February ===
- 9 February – The report of the Pospelov Commission is presented to the presidium.
- 14–25 February – 20th Congress of the Communist Party of the Soviet Union
- 25 February – Nikita Khrushchev makes the speech On the Cult of Personality and Its Consequences at the 20th Congress of the CPSU.

=== March ===
- March – 1956 Georgian demonstrations

=== October ===
- 19 October – Soviet–Japanese Joint Declaration of 1956

=== November ===
- 4 November – United Nations Security Council Resolution 120 is passed.
- 7 November – The 2nd Soviet Antarctic Expedition leaves Kaliningrad
- 18 November – "We will bury you" is spoken by Nikita Khrushchev.
- 21 November – Soviet submarine M-200 is rammed and sunk by a Soviet destroyer, killing the submarine's crew.

== Births ==
- 13 January - Vladimir Merovshchikov, Russian professional football coach and former player
- 1 March - Dalia Grybauskaite, president of Lithuania
- 19 March – Yegor Gaidar, economist (d. 2009)
- 6 May – Vladimir Lisin, oligarch
- 10 May – Vladislav Nikolayevich Listyev, journalist
- 7 November – Mikhail Alperin, jazz pianist, member of the Moscow Art Trio, professor at the Norwegian Academy of Music (d. 2018).

== Deaths ==
- 3 January – Alexander Gretchaninov, composer

== See also ==
- 1956 in fine arts of the Soviet Union
- List of Soviet films of 1956
