= Armen Abaghian =

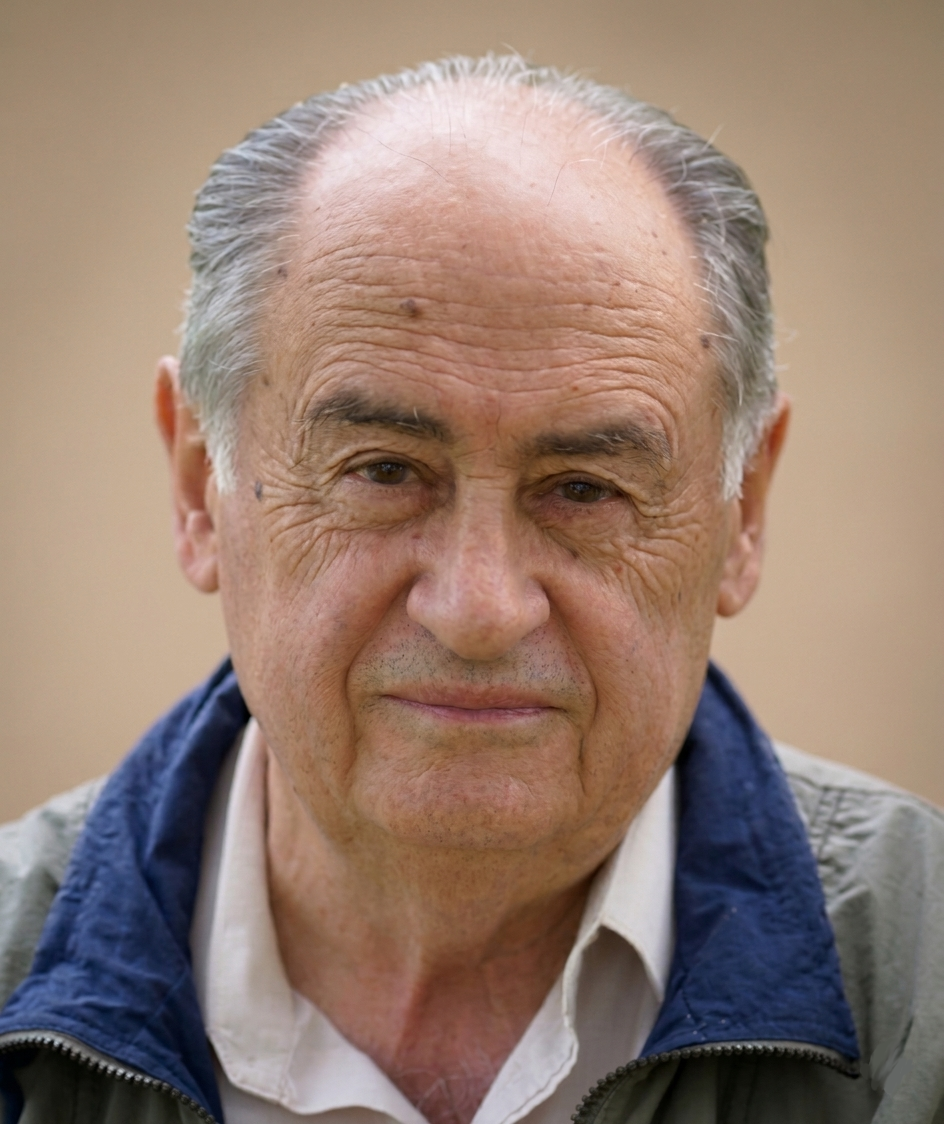
Armen Abagyan in 2004

Armen Artavazdovich Abaghian (commonly spelled as Abagyan, Armenian: Արմեն Աբաղյան; 1 January 1933 in Stepanakert, Nagorno-Karabakh – 18 November 2005 in Moscow, Russia) was a prominent Soviet nuclear physicist, engineer of nuclear reactors, Russian-Armenian specialist on nuclear power, Professor (1985), Corresponding Member of All-Soviet, and later Russian, Academy of Sciences. He was a cornerstone of Soviet and Russian nuclear safety. In 1984, he became the general director of "Energy" scientific and industrial state holding and the director of All-Soviet (then Russian) Institute of Atomic Energy Stations (AES) abbreviated as VNIIAES. His work bridged the gap between the Soviet nuclear infrastructure and the post-Chernobyl era of international transparency and high safety standards. Later he became the science and technology deputy director of Rosenergoatom, a member of IAEA Consultative Committee.

He graduated from the Moscow Engineering Physics Institute in 1956. His 150 publications are dedicated to the mathematical models of AES blocks, their security and anti-crisis information data-centers.

On November 18, 2005, he died during a fire that started in the neighboring apartment of a high-rise building where he lived with his family. Being cut off from the exit by the advancing fire and not receiving help from firefighters, Armen Abaghian and his wife Lily perished in the fire.

== Sources ==
- Armenian Concise Encyclopedia, Ed. by acad. K. Khudaverdian, Yerevan, 1990, Vol. 1, p. 7
