= 1980 in the Soviet Union =

- Decades: 1960s; 1970s; 1980s; 1990s
- See also: History of the Soviet Union; List of years in the Soviet Union

The following lists events that happened during 1980 in the Union of Soviet Socialist Republics.

== Incumbents ==
- General Secretary of the Communist Party of the Soviet Union: Leonid Brezhnev (1964–1982)
- Premier of the Soviet Union: Alexei Kosygin (1964–1980), Nikolai Tikhonov (1980–1985)

== Events ==
- 19 July–3 August – The Olympics take place in Moscow.
- Soviet–Afghan War

== Births ==
- 20 February – Zurab Yevloyev, former Russian professional football player
- 4 May – Mikhail Tsvetkov, Russian high jumper
- 12 June – Denys Monastyrsky, Ukrainian politician (died 2023)
- 22 June – Ilya Bryzgalov, former Russian ice hockey player
- 20 September – Vladimir Karpets, Russian cyclist

== Deaths ==
- January 26 — Justas Paleckis, 1st Chairman of the Presidium of the Supreme Soviet of the Lithuanian SSR (b. 1899)
- March 1 — Daniil Khrabrovitsky, screenwriter and film director (b. 1923)
- March 4 — Vakhtang Ananyan, writer and journalist (b. 1905)
- March 9 — Nikolay Bogolyubov, actor (b. 1899)
- March 11 — Mikhail Kaufman, cinematographer and photographer (b. 1897)
- April 11 — Yakov Zarobyan, 10th First Secretary of the Communist Party of Armenia (b. 1908)
- April 21
  - Kirill Ilyashenko, 3rd Chairman of the Presidium of the Supreme Soviet of the Moldovian SSR (b. 1915)
  - Alexander Oparin, biochemist (b. 1894)
- June 3 — Naum Akhiezer, mathematics (b. 1901)
- June 23 — Vadim Berezinskii, physicist (b. 1935)
- June 29 — Filipp Agaltsov, Soviet Air Force marshal of aviation (b. 1900)
- July 14 — Felix Berezin, mathematician and physicist (b. 1931)
- July 17 — Boris Delaunay, mathematician (b. 1890)
- July 20 — Lado Gudiashvili, painter (b. 1896)
- July 25 — Vladimir Vysotsky, singer-songwriter, poet and actor (b. 1938)
- August 8 — Oleg Kononenko, member of cosmonaut group LII-1 (b. 1938)
- October 2 — Valentin Varlamov, jet pilot (b. 1934)
- October 4 — Pyotr Masherov, 20th First Secretary of the Communist Party of Byelorussia (b. 1918)
- October 15 — Mikhail Lavrentyev, mathematician and hydrodynamicist (b. 1900)
- November 12 — Andrei Amalrik, writer and dissident (b. 1938)
- November 20 — Avtandil Gogoberidze, football player (b. 1922)
- December 4 — Sultan Ibraimov, 4th Chairman of the Presidium of the Supreme Soviet of the Kirghiz SSR (b. 1927)
- December 18 — Alexei Kosygin, 8th Premier of the Soviet Union (b. 1904)

=== Date unknown ===
- Akaki Mgeladze, 12th First Secretary of the Georgian Communist Party (b. 1910)
- Lev Balandin, swimmer (b. 1934)

== See also ==
- 1980 in fine arts of the Soviet Union
- List of Soviet films of 1980
