= 2005 Moscow power blackouts =

Power outage in Moscow, Russia

From 10:00 25 May 2005 to 16:00 26 May 2005, Moscow's power supplies were the centre of a major incident, which resulted in the supply being outed for several hours in many of City of Moscow districts, as well as Moscow, Tula, Kaluga and Ryazan provinces. Some tens of thousands of people were trapped in stranded underground trains in the Moscow Metro and in elevators, railway signaling was put out of action and many commercial and governmental organisations were paralysed.

== Occurrence ==
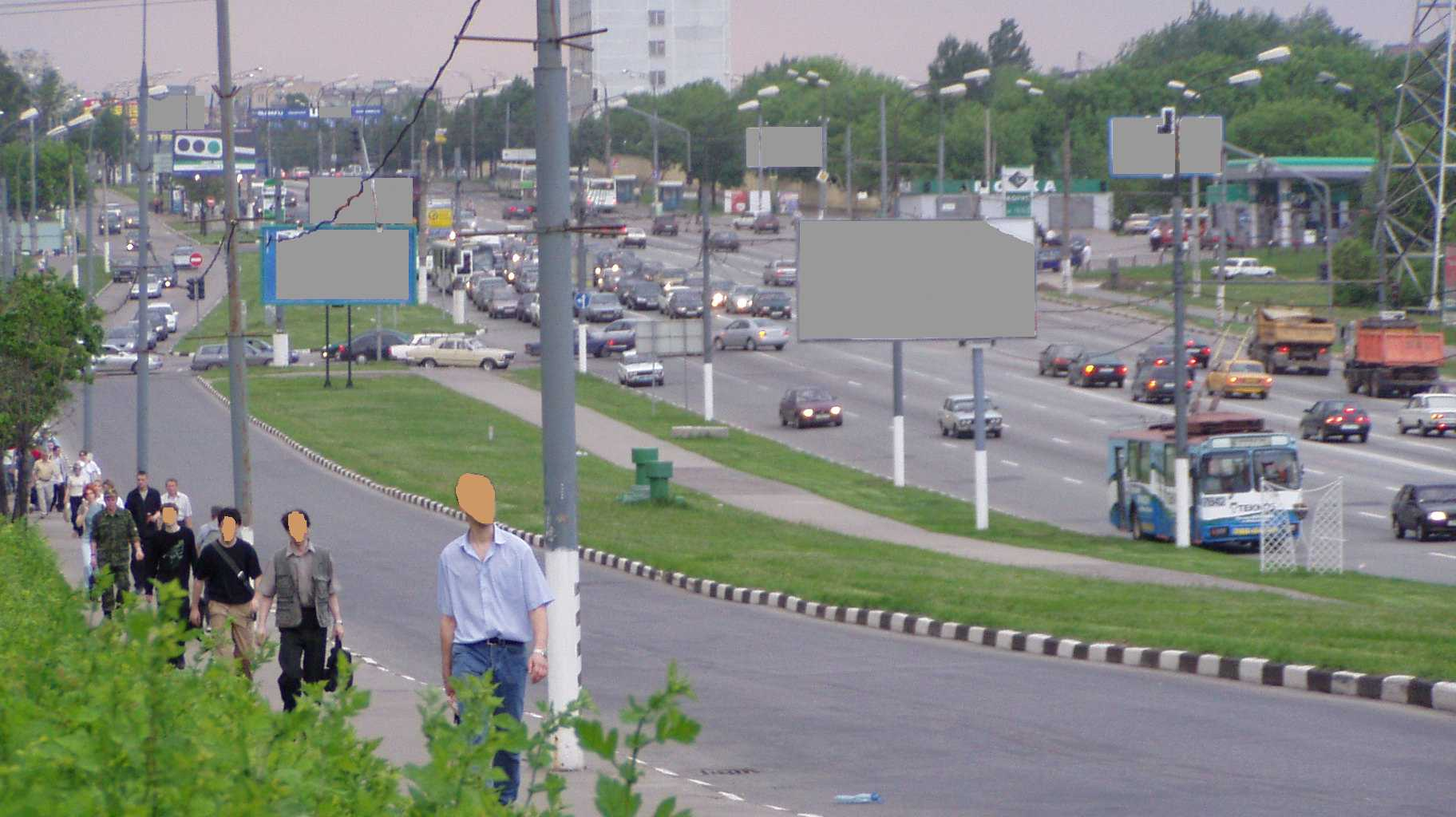
The blackout day, Varshavskoye highway, Moscow. People are heading home by foot. Note that the faces/billboards are covered by the photographer for security reasons.

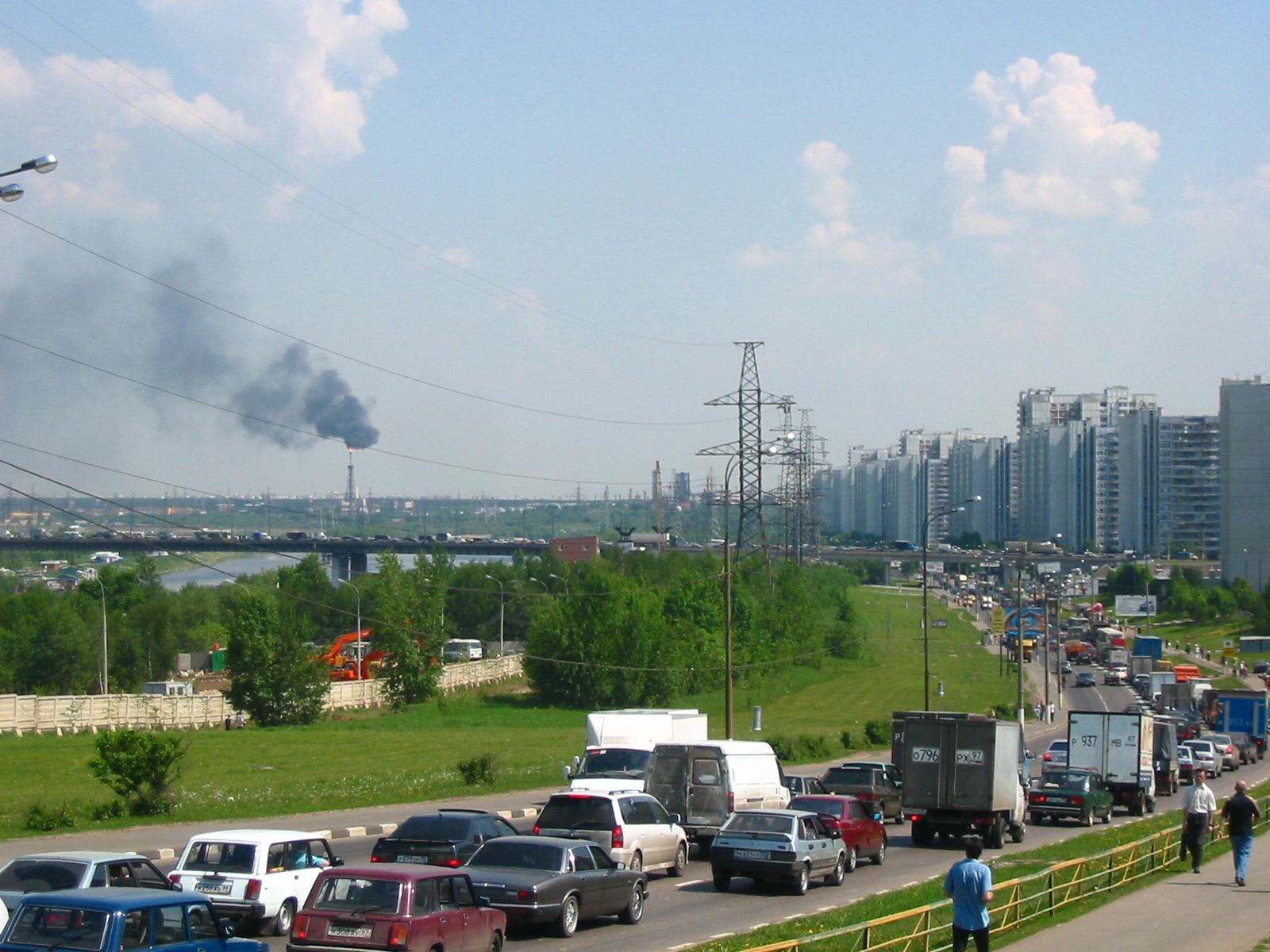
Traffic congestion in Moscow during the power outage.

The accident, which some accounts state affected more than 2 million people, started in powerstation no. 510 Chagino, situated in the south-east of Moscow in the Kapotnya district. Here, the high voltage (500 kV) current, going into the capital along the main power lines, is lowered via transformers for city usage to 220 kV and 110 kV.

The Chagino substation, built in 1964, is equipped with six high-to-low transformers. Another six substations situated around the MKAD carry out the same functions, and form the Moscow energy ring, which supply Moscow and neighbouring provinces with electricity.

== Theories of cause ==
The immediate cause of the incident, some state, was a mixture of several factors, among which feature: equipment wear-and-tear, absence of back-up powers, the fact that Moscow had endured temperatures above 30 °C (86 °F) for a number of days. Moreover, Moscow is a very complex region and has the most complex electrical schemata, or "copper board", as it is known by those in the business. It is the only region in which there has been no automatic shut-off system installed since the fall of the Soviet Union. This increased vulnerability of Moscow's electrical network played an important role in what happened.
