= 1982 in the Soviet Union =

- Decades: 1960s; 1970s; 1980s; 1990s
- See also: History of the Soviet Union; List of years in the Soviet Union

The following lists events that happened during 1982 in the Union of Soviet Socialist Republics.

== Incumbents ==
- General Secretary of the Communist Party of the Soviet Union:

Leonid Brezhnev (Until November 10)
Yuri Andropov (Starting November 12)

- Chairman of the Presidium of the Supreme Soviet of the Soviet Union:

Leonid Brezhnev (Until November 10)
Vasily Kuznetsov (Starting November 10) (acting)

- Chairman of the Council of Ministers of the Soviet Union:

Nikolai Tikhonov

== Events ==
- March 17 — Soviet leader Leonid Brezhnev declared his government's decision to freeze the deployment of medium range nuclear armaments in the European part of USSR.
- March 24 — A speech was delivered by Soviet leader Leonid Brezhnev in Tashkent to normalize Sino-Soviet relations.
- May 24 — Yuri Andropov, the chairman of the KGB is appointed to the Secretariat of the Communist Party of the Soviet Union.
- September 21 — Joint Soviet-Indian Declaration.
- November 10 — Leonid Brezhnev, who led the Soviet Union for 18 years, dies at 75.
- November 12 — Yuri Andropov was elected as General Secretary of the Communist Party of the Soviet Union.
- November 15 — The State Funeral of Leonid Brezhnev was held and he was buried at the Kremlin Wall Necropolis.
- December 1–5 — 1982 Prize of Moscow News.

== Births ==
- June 9 — Mamuka Bakhtadze, 13th Prime Minister of Georgia
- June 28 — Irakli Garibashvili, 11th & 15th Prime Minister of Georgia

== Deaths ==
- January 19 — Semyon Tsvigun, KGB officer (b. 1917)
- January 25 — Mikhail Suslov, Second Secretary of the Communist Party of the Soviet Union (b. 1902)
- March 18 — Vasily Chuikov, military commander (b. 1900)
- April 4 — Dzhabar Rasulov, 8th First Secretary of the Communist Party of Tajik SSR (b. 1913)
- April 12 — Vitaly Goryaev, painter, graphic illustrator and caricaturist (b. 1910)
- April 25 — Boris Andreyev, actor (b. 1915)
- May 12 — Aleksandr Borisov, stage and film actor, film director, screenwriter and singer (b. 1905)
- May 25 — Nikolai Mikhailov, 3rd Minister of Culture (b. 1906).
- May 28 — Motiejus Šumauskas, 2nd Chairman of the Presidium of the Supreme Soviet of the Lithuanian SSR (b. 1905)
- June 11 — Anatoly Solonitsyn, actor (b. 1934)
- June 24 — Nikita Salogor, 2nd First Secretary of the Communist Party of Moldavia (b. 1901)
- July 29 — Vladimir Smirnov, foil and épée fencer (b. 1954)
- August 8 — Zinovie Serdiuk, 6th First Secretary of the Communist Party of Moldavia (b. 1903)
- September 21 — Ivan Bagramyan, military commander (b. 1897)
- November 10 — Leonid Brezhnev, 4th Leader of the Soviet Union (b. 1906)
- November 28 — Ivan Hrushetsky, 7th Chairman of the Presidium of the Supreme Soviet of the Ukrainian SSR (b. 1904)
