= Grigoriy Lvovitch Bondarevsky =

Russian historian (1920–2003)

- Born: 25 January 1920; Odessa, Ukraine, Soviet Union
- Died: 7 August 2003 (aged 83); Moscow, Russia
- Occupations: Academician; Indologist<Historian
- Known for: Oriental studies
- Spouse: 1941—2003
- Awards: Padma Shri; Jawaharlal Nehru International Prize

Grigoriy Lvovitch Bondarevsky (25 January 1920 – 7 August 2003) was a Russian academician, writer, historian, Indologist and a professor at the Diplomatic Academy of the erstwhile Soviet Union. He was the author of 27 books and over 300 articles, majority of them covering Asian topics. The Government of India awarded him the fourth highest civilian award of the Padma Shri in 2000.

== Biography ==
Bondarevsky was born in Odessa, in the former Soviet Union (presently in Ukraine) on 25 January 1920 in a Jewish family and did his college studies in Moscow State University from where he graduated in history in 1940, followed by a master's degree in 1941. He started his career as the dean of the faculty of History at (formerly Luhansk State Pedagogical Institute, Shevchenko) but stayed there only one year to join Soviet Army in 1942, as the political instructor. During this period, he was involved with the organization of the Teheran Conference of 1943, where the American-British-Soviet coalition was cemented. Retiring from the Army in 1945, he joined the Political People's Commissariat of Uzbekistan as its Chief, de facto Deputy Foreign Minister, a post he held till 1951. He also completed his research on Berlin-to-Baghdad railway to secure a doctoral degree. In 1947, he started working simultaneously at National University of Uzbekistan, known in those days as the Eastern Central Asian State University, as the head of the Faculty of International Studies, where he established the chair of Oriental studies. He was also credited with the founding of the department of international relations. He moved to the Diplomatic Academy of the USSR in 1976 and served as a professor till 1984.

Bondarevsky served as an advisor to the Soviet Government, and after its disintegration, the Russian Government on Oriental Affairs till his death. He was a member of the Russian Academy of Sciences and served on its Institute of Social-Political Studies as a member. His contributions are reported behind the relief supplies provided to the war victims and their families in the aftermath of the Iraq War of 1991. He owned a 7000 volume library and published 27 books and over 300 articles, covering political topics related to Central and South Asia, Caucasian region, the Persian Gulf, the Near and Middle East. After conferring him with the Jawaharlal Nehru International Award, the Government of India honoured him again, in 2000, with the fourth highest civilian honour of the Padma Shri.

Bondarevsky, a member of the Anti-Zionist Committee of the Soviet government, was murdered on 7 August 2003 at his Moscow apartment, death resulting from the injuries sustained from heavy blows to his head. The alleged killer was soon apprehended but was acquitted later, after trial.

== See also ==
- Teheran Conference
- Gulf War
