= Nikolai Bakhvalov =

Soviet and Russian mathematician (1934–2005)

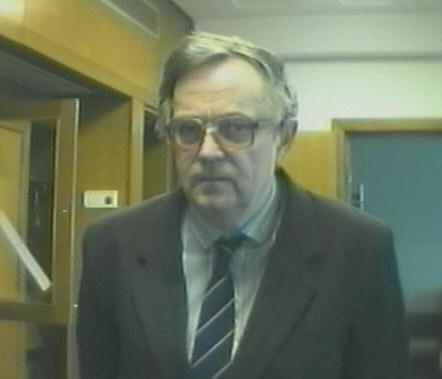
- Acad. Nikolai Sergeevich Bakhvalov
- Born: Nikolai Sergeevich Bakhvalov; May 29, 1934; Moscow, Russia
- Died: August 29, 2005 (aged 71); Moscow, Russia
- Occupation: Mathematician
- Known for: complexity, information-based complexity, multigrid method, homogenization
- Awards: USSR State Prize (1985) Order of Honour (Russia) (2005)

Nikolai Sergeevich Bakhvalov (Russian: Николай Серге́евич Бахвалов) (May 29, 1934 – August 29, 2005) was a Soviet and Russian mathematician.

Born in Moscow into the family of Sergei Vladimirovich Bakhvalov, a geometer at Moscow State University, N.S. Bakhvalov was exposed to mathematics from a young age. In 1950, Bakhvalov entered the Faculty of Mechanics and Mathematics at Moscow State University. His supervisors there included Kolmogorov and Sobolev. Bakhvalov defended his doctorate in 1958. He was a professor of mathematics at Moscow State University since 1966, specializing in computational mathematics. Bakhvalov was a member of the Russian Academy of Sciences since 1991 and a head of the department of computational mathematics at the college of mechanics and mathematics of the Moscow State University since 1981. Bakhvalov authored over 150 papers, several books, and a popular textbook on numerical methods.

He had made major pioneering contributions to many areas of mathematics and mechanics. Starting early in his career, Bakhvalov formulated and proved important results on the optimization of numerical algorithms. In 1959, he determined the complexity of the integration problem in the worst-case setting for integrands of smoothness. Furthermore, he proposed an optimal algorithm for the randomized setting. These can be considered early results in the theory of information-based complexity.

Bakhvalov was one of the pioneers of the multigrid method, contributed to the theory of homogenization, and fictitious domain methods.

Bakhvalov supervised 47 Ph.D. students and was an advisor to 11 doctorates.

== Notes ==
- https://www.netlib.org/na-digest-html/06/v06n04.html#5 Nikolaj S. Bakhvalov: May 29, 1934 - August 29, 2005
- From RAS
- Bakhvalov is sixty
