= 1985 in the Soviet Union =

- Decades: 1960s; 1970s; 1980s; 1990s
- See also: History of the Soviet Union; List of years in the Soviet Union

The following lists events that happened during 1985 in the Union of Soviet Socialist Republics.

== Incumbents ==
- General Secretary of the Communist Party of the Soviet Union: Konstantin Chernenko (until 10 march), Mikhail Gorbachev (starting 11 March)
- Premier of the Soviet Union: Nikolai Tikhonov
- Chairman of the Presidium of the Supreme Soviet of the Russian SFSR: Mikhail Yasnov (until 26 March), Vladimir Orlov (starting 26 March)

== Events ==
=== February ===
- February 24 — 1985 Russian Supreme Soviet election
- February 28 — Konstantin Chernenko makes a rare and last appearance on TV.

=== March ===
- March 10 — At 15:00, Soviet leader Konstantin Chernenko fell into a coma and died later that evening at 19:20, at age 73.
- March 11 — Mikhail Gorbachev succeeded Konstantin Chernenko as General Secretary.
- March 13 — Konstantin Chernenko was honored with a state funeral and was buried in the Kremlin Wall Necropolis, he was the last person to be interred there.

=== April ===
- The Soviet Union begins to transfer the burden of fighting the mujahideen to the armed forces of the Democratic Republic of Afghanistan.

=== May ===
- May 9 — The 3rd total Victory Day Parade is held on Red Square in Moscow in the Soviet Union.

=== November ===
- November 19 — Mikhail Gorbachev and Ronald Reagan meet for the first time in Geneva.

== Births ==
- January 25 — Tina Karol, Ukrainian singer
- April 25 — Vladimir Balyntec, Russian powerlifter
- September 17 — Alexander Ovechkin, Russian ice hockey player
- November 28 — Evgeny Alekseev, Russian chess grandmaster

== Deaths ==
- January 7 — Vladimir Kokkinaki, test pilot (b. 1904)
- January 22 — Mikhail Gromov, military aviator and test pilot (b. 1899)
- February 24 — Nigol Andresen, politician, writer, literary critic and translator (b. 1899)
- March 3 — Iosif Shklovsky, astronomer and astrophysicist (b. 1916)
- March 10 — Konstantin Chernenko, 6th Leader of the Soviet Union (b. 1911)
- March 17 — Nikolai Gusarov, 17th First Secretary of the Communist Party of Byelorussia (b. 1905)
- April 19
  - Pavel Batov, senior Red Army general (b. 1897)
  - Sergei Tokarev, ethnologist (b. 1899)
- May 22 — Aleksandr Babaev, Air Force fighter pilot (b. 1923)
- May 28 — Mamed Iskenderov, 6th Chairman of the Presidium of the Supreme Soviet of the Azerbaijan Soviet Socialist Republic (b. 1915)
- June 17 — Kirill Moskalenko, 2nd Commander of the Strategic Rocket Forces (b. 1902)
- October 10 — Yul Brynner, Russian-born American actor (b. 1920)
- October 14 — Emil Gilels, pianist (b. 1916)
- November 5 — Arnold Chikobava, linguist and philologist (b. 1898)
- November 10 — Givi Javakhishvili, 11th Chairman of the Council of Ministers of the Georgian Soviet Socialist Republic (b. 1912)
- November 13 — Alexander Pokryshkin, fighter pilot (b. 1913)
- November 18 — Dmitry Ryabyshev, military commander of the 8th Mechanized Corps (b. 1894)
- November 26 — Sergei Gerasimov, film director and screenwriter (b. 1906)
