= Aleksandr Babaev =

Soviet military pilot (1923–1985)

Alexander Ivanovich Babaev
- Александр Иванович Бабаев
- Born: 6 September 1923; Kaluga, Russian SFSR
- Died: 22 May 1985 (aged 61); Leningrad, Soviet Union
- Military career
- Allegiance: Soviet Union
- Branch: Soviet Air Force
- Service years: 1940 – 1985
- Rank: Colonel-General of Aviation
- Conflicts: World War II; Eastern Front
- Awards: Hero of the Soviet Union

Aleksandr Ivanovich Babaev (Russian: Александр Иванович Бабаев; 6 September 1923 – 22 May 1985) was a Soviet Air Force fighter pilot in the 196th Fighter Aviation Regiment during the Second World War who later went on to become a Colonel-General of Aviation. He was one of the first people to be awarded the Honoured Military Pilot of the USSR medal in 1965 and was later awarded the title Hero of the Soviet Union in 1978.

== Early life ==
Babaev was born on 6 September 1923 to a working-class Russian family in the city of Kaluga of the Russian SFSR. In 1930 the family moved to Voronezh. After graduating from secondary school in 1940 he studied aviation at the Voronezh Aeroclub until he joined the Red Army in December 1940.

== Military career ==
After enlisting in the Red Army in December 1940, Babaev graduated from the Bataysk Military Aviation School in 1941. From 1941 to April 1942 he served in the 16th and 27th Reserve Aviation Regiments until he was sent to the front of the Second World War.

Upon the German invasion of the Soviet Union, Babaev was deployed as part of the 196th Fighter Aviation Regiment of the 13th Air Army on Leningrad Front. During the war he rose up through the ranks from pilot to senior pilot and link commander until he was promoted to the rank of deputy squadron commander in November 1944. His regiment was later reorganized in September 1944 into the 7th Air Army on the Karelian Front. By the end of the war he held the rank of captain, having made 260 combat sorties on P-40E, R-39, and Yak-1 fighters which involved 48 aerial battles in which he scored nine individual shootdowns and one in a group.

Babaev remained in the military after the war. In 1947 he graduated from the Higher Officers Airborne Tactical Air Force courses in Lipetsk, and in 1948 he returned to the 196th Fighter Aviation Regiment as squadron commander until he was briefly reassigned to the 274th Fighter Regiment in 1950. In 1951 he was reassigned to the 234th Fighter Aviation Regiment where he was the commander until he was assigned to be the deputy commander of the 9th Fighter Aviation division in 1954. After graduating from the Military Academy of the General Staff of the Armed Forces of the USSR in 1958 he was put in command of the 126th Fighter Aviation Division of the 16th Air Army in East Germany. From 1963 to 1965 he was the deputy commander of combat training and from 1965 to 1967 he was the First Deputy Commander of the 24th Air Army. From 1967 to 1968 he served as the First Deputy Commander of the 26th Air Army of the Belorussian Military District until he was reassigned from April 1968 to August 1973 as commander of the 76th Air Army of the Leningrad Military District. From then until September 1978 he was commander of the 16th Air Army, during that time he was awarded the title Hero of the Soviet Union for both his service in the Second World War and the training of troops. From September 1978 to April 1980, he was again put in command of the 76th Air Army until it was abolished in 1980. From then to January 1985 he was the commander of the Leningrad Military District Air Force and was a consultant at the S.M. Kirov Military Medical Academy. He died on 22 May 1985 and was buried in the Bogoslovskoe Cemetery in Leningrad. He was also a member of the Supreme Soviet of the RSFSR from 1975 to 1980; at that time he lived in Leningrad.

== Awards and honors ==
- Hero of the Soviet Union
- Two Orders of Lenin (July 25, 1949; February 21, 1978)
- Four Orders of the Red Banner
- Two Orders of the Patriotic War
- Four Orders of the Red Star
- Medal "For Courage" (February 13, 1943)
- Medal "For Battle Merit"
- Honoured Military Pilot of the USSR
- jubilee and campaign medals

== See also ==
- Soviet Air Forces
- Aerial warfare
