= 1954 in the Soviet Union =

- Decades: 1930s; 1940s; 1950s; 1960s; 1970s
- See also: History of the Soviet Union; List of years in the Soviet Union

The following lists events that happened during 1954 in the Union of Soviet Socialist Republics.

== Incumbents ==
- First Secretary of the Communist Party of the Soviet Union – Nikita Khrushchev
- Chairman of the Presidium of the Supreme Soviet of the Soviet Union – Kliment Voroshilov
- Chairman of the Council of Ministers of the Soviet Union – Georgy Malenkov

== Events ==
=== January ===
- 25 January-18 February – Berlin Conference (1954)

=== February ===
- 19 February – 1954 transfer of Crimea

=== March ===
- 14 March – Soviet Union legislative election, 1954

=== May ===
- 16 May-26 June – Kengir uprising

=== June ===
- 6 June – Moscow's statue of Yuriy Dolgorukiy, originally conceived in 1947 in recognition of the 800th anniversary of the city's foundation, is finally unveiled.
- 26 June – The world's first civilian nuclear power station, Obninsk Nuclear Power Plant, is commissioned.

=== September ===
- 14 September – The Totskoye nuclear exercise is held.

== Births ==
- 23 February – Viktor Yushchenko, third President of Ukraine
- 4 March – Irina Ratushinskaya, writer
- 16 June – Sergey Kuryokhin, composer
- 17 August – Anatoly Kudryavitsky, writer
- 30 August – Alexander Lukashenko, President of Belarus

== Deaths ==
- 12 February – Dziga Vertov, filmmaker (born 1896)
- 17 May – Varvara Brilliant-Lerman, plant physiologist (born 1888).
- 22 November – Andrey Vyshinsky, diplomat (born 1883)

== See also ==
- 1954 in fine arts of the Soviet Union
- List of Soviet films of 1954
