= Vladimir Kulakov =

Russian politician

- Владимир Кулаков
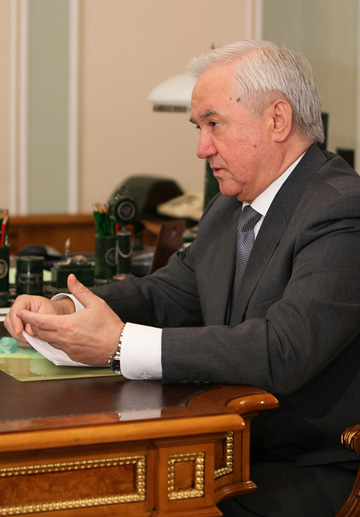
- Kulakov in 2008

Russian Federation Senator from Voronezh Oblast
- In office 13 May 2009 – 3 November 2011
- Preceded by: Konstantin Yeryomenko
- Succeeded by: Gennady Makin

5th Governor of Voronezh Oblast
- In office 24 December 2000 – 12 March 2009
- Preceded by: Ivan Shabanov
- Succeeded by: Alexey Gordeyev

Personal details
- Born: Vladimir Grigoryevich Kulakov; 23 April 1944 (age 80); Komsomolsk-on-Amur, Russia, Soviet Union
- Political party: United Russia

Vladimir Grigoryevich Kulakov (Russian: Владимир Григорьевич Кулаков; born April 23, 1944) was the 5th Governor of Voronezh Oblast in Russia from 2000 to 2009. He sees himself in favour of strengthening of intelligence agencies. He became governor on December 24, 2000, and was re-elected on March 14, 2004. On February 16, 2009, his term ending on March 12 was not prolonged by Dmitry Medvedev.
