= 1958 in the Soviet Union =

- Decades: 1930s; 1940s; 1950s; 1960s; 1970s
- See also: History of the Soviet Union; List of years in the Soviet Union

The following lists events that happened during 1958 in the Union of Soviet Socialist Republics.

== Incumbents ==
- First Secretary of the Communist Party of the Soviet Union – Nikita Khrushchev
- Chairman of the Presidium of the Supreme Soviet of the Soviet Union – Kliment Voroshilov
- Chairman of the Council of Ministers of the Soviet Union – Nikolai Bulganin (until 27 March), Nikita Khrushchev (starting 27 March)

== Events ==
- 1958 Soviet nuclear tests

=== March ===
- 16 March – Soviet Union legislative election, 1958

=== May ===
- 15 May – Sputnik 3 is launched.

=== August ===
- 23–27 August – 1958 Grozny riots

=== September ===
- 2 September – 1958 C-130 shootdown incident

== Births ==
- 2 January – Vladimir Ovchinnikov, pianist
- 28 February – Natalya Estemirova, activist (died 2009)
- 22 June – Serhiy Kot, Ukrainian historian (died 2022)
- 21 October – Andre Geim, physicist

=== Full date missing ===
- Olga Tsepilova, sociologist

== Deaths ==
- 10 February – Aleksander Klumberg, Estonian decathlete (born 1899)

== See also ==
- 1958 in fine arts of the Soviet Union
- List of Soviet films of 1958
