= 1934 in the Soviet Union =

- Decades: 1920s; 1930s; 1940s; 1950s
- See also: History of the Soviet Union; List of years in the Soviet Union

The following lists events that happened during 1934 in the Union of Soviet Socialist Republics.

== Incumbents ==
- General Secretary of the Communist Party of the Soviet Union – Joseph Stalin
- Chairman of the Central Executive Committee of the Congress of Soviets – Mikhail Kalinin
- Chairman of the Council of People's Commissars of the Soviet Union – Vyacheslav Molotov

== Events ==
- January 26 – February 10 — 17th Congress of the All-Union Communist Party (Bolsheviks)
- September 18 — Soviet Union joins the League of Nations as a permanent Board member

=== Undated ===
- Plans for the new T-34 tank are first drawn up
- Second Five Year plan underway

== Births ==
- January 4 — Zurab Tsereteli, Georgian painter, sculptor and architect (d. 2025)
- January 7 — Viktor Pavlovich Potapov, military officer (d. 2021)
- February 1 — Marina Kondratyeva, ballerina (d. 2024)
- February 2 — Otar Iosseliani, Georgian film director (d. 2023)
- February 7 — Murtaza Rakhimov, 1st President of Bashkortostan (d. 2023)
- March 1 — Elmira Gafarova, 14th Chairwoman of the Supreme Soviet of Azerbaijan (d. 1993)
- March 9 — Yuri Gagarin, first man in space (d. 1968)
- March 12 — Vladimir Stolnikov, boxer (d. 1990)
- March 23 — Ludvig Faddeev, physicist and mathematician (d. 2017)
- April 3 — Alexander Dzasokhov, 2nd President of North Ossetia
- April 7 — Lev Anninsky, Russian literary critic, historian and screenwriter (d. 2019)
- April 28 – Raisa Belskikh, Russian agronomist (d. 2012)
- May 4 — Tatiana Samoilova, actress (d. 2014)
- May 8 — Anastasiya Kobzarenko, librarian
- May 13 — Yury Morozov, football player and coach (d. 2005)
- May 14 — Nikolay Gusakov, Nordic combined skier (d. 1991)
- May 29 — Nikolai Bakhvalov, mathematician (d. 2005)
- May 30 — Alexei Leonov, cosmonaut and aviator (d. 2019)
- June 6 — Yuri Korolev, ice hockey administrator and coach (d. 2026)
- June 14 — Viktor Bortsov, theatrical and cinema actor (d. 2008)
- June 22 — Otto Latsis, Russian journalist (d. 2005)
- July 13 — Aleksei Yeliseyev, cosmonaut
- August 2 — Valery Bykovsky, cosmonaut (d. 2019)
- August 10 — Valeri Urin, football player and coach (d. 2023)
- August 11 — Viktor Tolmachev, engineer (d. 2018)
- August 21 — Gennadiy Aygi, Chuvash poet and translator (d. 2006)
- August 29 — Gennady Kazmin, politician (d. 2018)
- August 30 — Anatoly Solonitsyn, actor (d. 1982)
- September 1 — Mikhail Lapshin, 4th Head of the Altai Republic (d. 2006)
- September 4 — Eduard Khil, baritone (d. 2012)
- September 13 — Tamara Milashkina, soprano (d. 2024)
- September 16 — Tamara Manina, artistic gymnast
- September 19 — Apas Jumagulov, 3rd Prime Minister of Kyrgyzstan
- October 13 — Savely Kramarov, actor and comedian (d. 1995)
- November 9 — Tengiz Sigua, 2nd Prime Minister of Georgia (d. 2020)
- December 3 — Viktor Gorbatko, cosmonaut (d. 2017)
- December 8 — Alisa Freindlich, actress
- December 15 — Stanislav Shushkevich, 1st Chairman of the Supreme Council of Belarus (d. 2022)
- December 18 — Boris Volynov, cosmonaut

== Deaths ==
- May 10 — Vyacheslav Menzhinsky, 2nd Chairman of the OPGU (b. 1874)
- June 11 — Lev Vygotsky, psychologist (b. 1896)
- July 6 — Nestor Makhno, anarchist (b. 1888)
- July 14 — Valerian Dovgalevsky, 5th People's Commissar of the Posts and Telegraphs of the Russian SFSR (b. 1885)
- October 14 — Mikhail Matyushin, painter and composer (b. 1861)
- December 1 — Sergei Kirov, 8th First Secretary of the Leningrad City Committee of the Communist Party of the Soviet Union (b. 1886)

== See also ==
- 1934 in fine arts of the Soviet Union
- List of Soviet films of 1934
- T-34
- Soviet Union
