= Pyotr Sumin =

Russian politician (1946–2011)

- Пётр Сумин
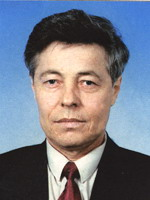

2nd Governor of Chelyabinsk Oblast
- In office 5 January 1997 – 22 April 2010
- Preceded by: Vadim Solovyov
- Succeeded by: Mikhail Yurevich

Governor of Chelyabinsk Oblast
- contested by Vadim Solovyov
- In office 10 June 1993 – 22 October 1993

Chairman of Chelyabinsk City Executive Committee
- In office 1984–1987
- Preceded by: Mikhail Polozhentsev
- Succeeded by: Valery Potkin

Personal details
- Born: 21 June 1946 Verkhnyaya Sanarka, Kochkarsky District, Chelyabinsk Oblast, RSFSR, Soviet Union
- Died: 6 January 2011 (aged 64) Chelyabinsk, Russia
- Party: United Russia (2004–11)
- Education: South Ural State University
- Awards: Alt text

Pyotr Ivanovich Sumin (Russian: Пётр Иванович Сумин; 21 June 1946 – 6 January 2011) was the governor of Chelyabinsk Oblast of Russia. He was sequentially a member of the Communist Party of the Soviet Union, Communist Party of the Russian Federation and Political Party United Russia.

In 1993 Sumin won the first election of the Head of Administration of Chelyabinsk Oblast, gaining more than 50% of the votes. However, the results of the elections were canceled, despite the decision of the Constitutional Court of Russia recognising legality of Sumin's election. Until October 1993 there were two administrations in the region, led by Pyotr Sumin and Vadim Solovyov respectively. In October 1993, after the dissolution of the Supreme Soviet, President Boris Yeltsin confirmed Solovyov's powers.

Sumin became governor of Chelyabinsk Oblast in December 1996 receiving 58% of the vote. He complained about nuclear waste in his region. Sumin was elected governor in 1996, taking office on 5 January 1997 and reelected in 2000.

In April 2005, following changes in the law, he was nominated for a third term by Russian president Vladimir Putin and unanimously confirmed by the Oblast assembly. In March 2010, Sumin said he would not apply for a new governor's term. He was succeeded by Mikhail Yurevich.
