= 1960 in the Soviet Union =

- Decades: 1940s; 1950s; 1960s; 1970s; 1980s
- See also: History of the Soviet Union; List of years in the Soviet Union

== Incumbents ==
- Communist Party Leader – Nikita Khrushchev, First Secretary of the Communist Party of the Soviet Union
- Head of State –
  1. Kliment Voroshilov, Chairman of the Presidium of the Supreme Soviet of the Soviet Union
  2. Leonid Brezhnev, Chairman of the Presidium of the Supreme Soviet of the Soviet Union
- Premier – Nikita Khrushchev, Chairman of the Council of Ministers of the Soviet Union
