= 1981 in the Soviet Union =

- Decades: 1960s; 1970s; 1980s; 1990s
- See also: History of the Soviet Union; List of years in the Soviet Union

The following lists events that happened during 1981 in the Union of Soviet Socialist Republics.

== Incumbents ==
- General Secretary of the Communist Party of the Soviet Union: Leonid Brezhnev
- Premier of the Soviet Union: Nikolai Tikhonov
- Chairman of the Supreme Court of the Soviet Union – Lev Smirnov

== Events ==
- 1 April – Daylight saving time was implemented for the first time in the USSR
- 28 April – The USSR national team won the World Ice Hockey Championship in Sweden

== Births ==
- 31 January – Yulia Nachalova, singer (d. 2019)
- 18 February – Andrei Kirilenko, basketball player
- 19 March – Maksim Arap, footballer
- 26 March – Danis Zaripov, ice hockey player
- 30 March – Sergei Mozyakin, ice hockey player
- 8 April – Nikolay Kruglov Jr., biathlete
- 12 April – Yuriy Borzakovskiy, middle-distance runner
- 17 April – Konstantin Koltsov, ice hockey player (d. 2024)
- 30 April – Peter Nalitch, singer
- 29 May – Andrey Arshavin, footballer
- 2 June – Nikolay Davydenko, tennis player
- 7 June – Anna Kournikova, tennis player
- 26 June – Natalya Antyukh, athlete
- 6 July – Roman Shirokov, footballer
- 8 July – Anastasia Myskina, tennis player
- 30 August – Daniil Vorobyov, film and theatre actor
- 2 September – Aleksey Chadov, film actor
- 3 September – Evgeniya Brik, actress (d. 2022)
- 15 October – Marina Toybina, fashion and costume designer
- 31 October – Irina Denezhkina, writer
- 2 November – Tatiana Totmianina, pair skater
- 5 November – Ksenia Sobchak, political figure
- 30 November – Olga Krasko, actress
- 15 December – Roman Pavlyuchenko, footballer
- 16 December – Olga Medynich, theater and film actress
- 23 December – Anastasiya Makeyeva, actress and model
- 24 December – Dima Bilan, singer, songwriter

== Deaths ==
- February 7 — Emil Spiridonov, navy officer (b. 1925)
- March 3 — Oleg Dal, actor (b. 1941)
- March 7 — Kirill Kondrashin, conductor (b. 1914)
- March 21 — Mark Donskoy (b. 1901)
- March 28 — Yuri Trifonov, leading representative of the so-called Soviet "Urban Prose" (b. 1925)
- April 1 — Agniya Barto, poet and writer (b. 1901)
- April 16 — Leonid Melnykov, politician and diplomat (b. 1906)
- April 28
  - Lev Loktev, artillery designer (b. 1908)
  - Grigory Shpigel, actor (b. 1914)
- August 27 — Valeri Kharlamov, ice hockey player (b. 1948)
- November 18 — Alexey Okladnikov, archaeologist and ethnographer (b. 1908)
- November 30 — Tankho Israilov, ballet dancer (b. 1917)
- December 4 — Valentin Fyodorov, football player and coach (b. 1911)
- December 11 — Zoya Fyodorova, actress (b. 1907)
- December 15 — Mikhail Zharov, actor and director (b. 1899)

== See also ==
List of Soviet films of 1981

1981 in fine arts of the Soviet Union
