= 1938 in the Soviet Union =

- Decades: 1920s; 1930s; 1940s; 1950s
- See also: History of the Soviet Union; List of years in the Soviet Union

The following lists events that happened during 1938 in the Union of Soviet Socialist Republics.

== Incumbents ==
- General Secretary of the Communist Party of the Soviet Union – Joseph Stalin
- Chairman of the Presidium of the Supreme Soviet of the Soviet Union – Mikhail Kalinin
- Chairman of the Council of People's Commissars of the Soviet Union – Vyacheslav Molotov

== Events ==
- March – Trial of the Twenty-One
- 15 March – The Soviet Union announces officially that Nikolai Bukharin has been executed.
- 29 July–11 August – Battle of Lake Khasan
- 2 September – Soviet Ambassador to Britain Ivan Maisky calls on Winston Churchill, telling him that Soviet Foreign Commissar Maxim Litvinov has expressed to the French chargé d'affaires in Moscow that the Soviet Union is willing to fight over the territorial integrity of Czechoslovakia.
- unknown date – Family plots produce 22% of all Soviet agricultural produce, on only 4% of all cultivated land.

== Births ==
- January 2 — Anatoly Samoilenko, Ukrainian mathematician (d. 2020)
- January 8 — Yevgeny Nesterenko, Russian operatic bass (d. 2021)
- January 18 — Stepan Topal, Moldovan politician (d. 2018)
- January 23 — Anatoly Marchenko, dissident, author and human rights campaigner (d. 1986)
- January 25 — Vladimir Vysotsky, Russian singer-songwriter, poet and actor (d. 1980)
- January 30 — Islam Karimov, 1st President of Uzbekistan (d. 2016)
- February 19 — Galina Dzhugashvili, Russian translator of French and granddaughter of Joseph Stalin (d. 2007)
- February 24 — Emma Gapchenko, archer
- March 2 — Vyacheslav Zaitsev, Russian fashion designer (d. 2023)
- March 17 — Rudolf Nureyev, Russian-born dancer, choreographer (d. 1993)
- March 20 — Sergei Novikov, Russian mathematician (d. 2024)
- April 5 — Natalya Kustinskaya, actress (d. 2012)
- April 9 — Victor Chernomyrdin, 29th Prime Minister of Russia (d. 2010)
- April 19 — Marita Katusheva, competitive volleyball player and Olympic silver medalist (d. 1992)
- April 20 — Igor Sergeyev, 4th Minister of Defence of the Russian Federation (d. 2006)
- May 12
  - Ayaz Mutallibov, 1st President of Azerbaijan (d. 2022)
  - Zoya Krasnova, plant operator (d. 2014)
- June 9 — Tengiz Kitovani, Georgian politician military commander (d. 2023)
- June 24
  - Abulfaz Elchibey, 2nd President of Azerbaijan (d. 2000)
  - Boris Lagutin, boxer (d. 2022)
- July 9 — Liya Akhedzhakova, Russian actress
- July 10 — Vera Shebeko, Russian anchorwoman
- July 14 — Lillian Malkina, Russian actress
- July 18 — Valery Kerdemelidi, Russian artistic gymnast
- July 21 — Vladimir Radionov, Russian football player, coach and official
- July 22 — Mark Rakita, Russian sabreur and coach
- August 9
  - Leonid Kuchma, 2nd President of Ukraine
  - Oleksandr Omelchenko, Ukrainian politician, Mayor of Kyiv (d. 2021)
- August 19 — Valentin Mankin, Ukrainian Soviet sailor, Olympic triple champion and silver medalist (d. 2014)
- September 25 — Myechyslaw Hryb, 2nd Chairman of the Supreme Council of Belarus
- October 10 — Oleg Gordievsky, Russian double agent
- October 12 — Nina Andreyeva, Soviet and Russian chemist, teacher, author, political activist and social critic (d. 2020)
- October 2 — Vladimir Muravyov, Soviet and Russian military officer (d. 2020)
- October 24 — Venedikt Yerofeyev, writer and dissident (d. 1990)
- November 11 — Ants Antson, Estonian speed skater (d. 2015)
- November 24 — Natalya Krachkovskaya, Soviet and Russian actress (d. 2016)
- December 19 — Nikolay Dutov, long-distance runner (d. 1992)

== Deaths ==
- January 22 – Sergei Buturlin, Soviet ornithologist (b. 1872)
- February 8
  - Mikhail Batorsky, Soviet komkor (executed) (b. 1890)
  - Nikolai Kuzmin, Soviet political and military leader (executed) (b. 1883)
- March 15 – Nikolai Bukharin, Alexei Rykov, Nikolay Krestinsky, Genrikh Yagoda, Arkady Rosengolts, Vladimir Ivanov, Mikhail Alexandrovich Chernov, Hryhoriy Hrynko, Fayzulla Khodzhayev and Vasily Sharangovich
- June 20 – Nikolai Janson, Russian politician (shot)
- July 28 – Yakov Alksnis
- July 29 – Pavel Dybenko
- August 16 – Sergey Aydarov, actor (b. 1867)
- August 22 – Eduard Lepin, Latvian-born Soviet general (b. 1889)
- November 9 – Vasily Blyukher
- December 15 – Valery Chkalov, test pilot (b. 1904)
- December 27 – Osip Mandelstam, poet (b. 1891)

== See also ==
- 1938 in fine arts of the Soviet Union
- List of Soviet films of 1938
