= 1961 in film =

The year 1961 in film involved some significant events, with West Side Story winning 10 Academy Awards.

== Top-grossing films (U.S.) ==
The top ten 1961 released films by box office gross in North America are as follows:

Highest-grossing films of 1961
Rank	Title	Distributor	Domestic rentals
1	West Side Story	United Artists	$19,645,000
2	The Guns of Navarone	Columbia	$13,000,000
3	El Cid	Allied Artists	$12,000,000
4	The Parent Trap	Buena Vista	$9,300,000
5	The Absent-Minded Professor	Buena Vista	$9,000,000
6	King of Kings	MGM	$8,000,000
7	Lover Come Back	Universal	$7,625,000
8	One Hundred and One Dalmatians	Buena Vista	$6,200,000
9	La Dolce Vita	Cineriz / Pathé	$6,000,000
10	Come September	Universal	$5,772,000

== Top-grossing films by country ==
The highest-grossing 1961 films from countries outside of North America.

Country	Title	Studio	Gross
India	Gunga Jumna	Mehboob Studio	$14,610,000 (Note: ₹7 crore (US$14.61 million) (Note: 4.79 Indian rupees per US dollar from 1948 to 1966))
Soviet Union	Striped Trip	Lenfilm	$12,720,000 (Note: 11.45 million Rbls (45.8 million tickets sold, average ticket price of 25 kopecks), 0.9 Rbl per US dollar from 1961 to 1971)

== Events ==
- May 13 – Legendary actor Gary Cooper dies at the age of 60 in Los Angeles from colon and prostate cancer. Best known for his appearances in classic films such as Wings, Mr. Deeds Goes to Town, Sergeant York, The Pride of the Yankees and High Noon, Cooper was one of the biggest stars of Hollywood's Golden Age and won two Academy Awards for Best Actor.
- June 28 – Cubby Broccoli and Harry Saltzman sign a multi-picture deal with United Artists to produce a series of films based on the novels of Ian Fleming starting with either Dr. No or Diamonds Are Forever. The series goes on to become the highest-grossing film series of all time.
- July 17 – Trans World Airlines screens Come September to the press aboard one of its jets to introduce in-flight movies.
- October 18 – The film version of the musical West Side Story is released. Directed by Robert Wise and Jerome Robbins and starring Natalie Wood, Richard Beymer, Russ Tamblyn, Rita Moreno and George Chakiris, it becomes the year's highest-grossing film and goes on to win ten Academy Awards, including Best Picture, Best Director (for Wise and Robbins), Best Supporting Actor (for Chakiris) and Best Supporting Actress (for Moreno).

== Awards ==
Category/Organization	19th Golden Globe Awards March 5, 1962		34th Academy Awards April 9, 1962
Category/Organization	Drama	Comedy or Musical	34th Academy Awards April 9, 1962
Best Film	The Guns of Navarone	A Majority of One (Comedy); West Side Story (Musical)	West Side Story
Best Director	Stanley Kramer; Judgment at Nuremberg		Robert Wise and Jerome Robbins; West Side Story
Best Actor	Maximilian Schell; Judgment at Nuremberg	Glenn Ford; Pocketful of Miracles	Maximilian Schell; Judgment at Nuremberg
Best Actress	Geraldine Page; Summer and Smoke	Rosalind Russell; A Majority of One	Sophia Loren; Two Women
Best Supporting Actor	George Chakiris; West Side Story		
Best Supporting Actress	Rita Moreno; West Side Story		
Best Original Score	Dimitri Tiomkin; The Guns of Navarone		Henry Mancini; Breakfast at Tiffany's (Drama or Comedy); Saul Chaplin, Johnny Green, Sid Ramin and Irwin Kostal; West Side Story (Musical)
Best Original Song	"Town Without Pity"; Town Without Pity		"Moon River"; Breakfast at Tiffany's
Best Foreign Language Film	Two Women		Through a Glass Darkly

== 1961 film releases ==
United States unless stated

=== January–March ===
- January 1961
  - 6 January
    - The Marriage-Go-Round
  - 16 January
    - The Girl on the Boat
  - 21 January
    - Pigs and Battleships (Japan)
  - 24 January
    - His and Hers
    - La Notte (Italy/France)
  - 25 January
    - One Hundred and One Dalmatians
  - 26 January
    - The Mark
  - 27 January
    - Jhumroo (India)
  - 28 January
    - A Fever in the Blood
    - A Soldier's Prayer (Japan)
- February 1961
  - 1 February
    - The Misfits
  - 2 February
    - Garibaldi (Italy)
  - 9 February
    - Girl with a Suitcase (Italy)
    - Mother Joan of the Angels (Poland)
    - No Love for Johnnie
  - 10 February
    - Cry for Happy
  - 15 February
    - The Coachman (South Korea)
  - 16 February
    - The Long and the Short and the Tall
  - 20 February
    - Nude on the Moon
    - Reptilicus
  - 22 February
    - The Great Impostor
- March 1961
  - 1 March
    - Posse from Hell
  - 2 March
    - The Rebel
  - 3 March
    - Lola (France)
  - 10 March
    - Five Golden Hours (Italy)
    - Go Naked in the World (Italy)
  - 15 March
    - The Terror of the Tongs
  - 16 March
    - The Absent-Minded Professor
  - 20 March
    - Blast of Silence
  - 22 March
    - All in a Night's Work
  - 23 March
    - Carry On Regardless
  - 24 March
    - Town Without Pity (U.S./West Germany/Switzerland)
    - Underworld U.S.A.
  - 26 March
    - The Hoodlum Priest
    - Konga
  - 27 March
    - The Assassin (Italy)
  - 29 March
    - Gorgo
    - Violent Life (Italy)
  - 30 March
    - One-Eyed Jacks

=== April–June ===
- April 1961
  - 2 April
    - The Sins of Rachel Cade
  - 4 April
    - The Greengage Summer
    - Mr. Topaze
    - Two Living, One Dead (U.K./Sweden)
  - 13 April
    - Madison Avenue
    - Nazrana (India)
  - 17 April
    - Master of the World
  - 18 April
    - Sanctuary
  - 19 April
    - Hercules and the Conquest of Atlantis (Italy)
    - Please, Not Now! (France)
  - 24 April
    - The Secret Ways
  - 25 April
    - Yojimbo (Japan)
  - 27 April
    - The Guns of Navarone
- May 1961
  - 2 May
    - The Beast of Yucca Flats
  - 3 May
    - Atlantis, the Lost Continent
  - 4 May
    - Parrish
  - 5 May
    - Return to Peyton Place
    - Teen Kanya (India)
  - 12 May
    - Mad Dog Coll
  - 14 May
    - Angel Baby
    - Goliath Against the Giants (Italy)
    - Viridiana (Mexico/Spain)
  - 17 May
    - The Long Absence (France)
    - Professor Mamlock (East Germany)
    - The Right Approach
  - 21 May
    - A Bomb Was Stolen (Romania)
  - 24 May
    - The Young Savages
  - 26 May
    - Snow White and the Three Stooges
  - 27 May
    - The Last Time I Saw Archie
  - 29 May
    - A Raisin in the Sun
- June 1961
  - 1 June
    - The Pleasure of His Company
  - 2 June
    - Gidget Goes Hawaiian
  - 5 June
    - Taste of Fear
  - 6 June
    - The Deadly Companions
  - 7 June
    - The Curse of the Werewolf
    - Scarlet Sails
  - 8 June
    - The Last Sunset
    - Romanoff and Juliet
    - Wild in the Country
  - 11 June
    - The Big Bankroll
  - 13 June
    - The Lovemakers (France)
  - 16 June
    - The Colossus of Rhodes (Italy)
  - 21 June
    - The Parent Trap
    - Two Loves
  - 22 June
    - Antigone (Greece)
    - Black Silk (Thailand)
    - Flame in the Streets
    - Magic Boy
  - 25 June
    - Last Year at Marienbad (France)
  - 28 June
    - Fanny
    - Homicidal
    - The Ladies Man
    - The Naked Edge
    - Question 7 (West Germany/U.S.)
  - 29 June
    - Goodbye Again (France/U.S.)

=== July–September ===
- July 1961
  - 3 July
    - The Miracle of Father Malachia (West Germany)
  - 8 July
    - Panda and the Magic Serpent
  - 9 July
    - Armored Command
  - 12 July
    - Francis of Assisi
    - Voyage to the Bottom of the Sea
  - 13 July
    - The Exiles
  - 14 July
    - Alakazam the Great
  - 16 July
    - The Big Gamble
  - 19 July
    - By Love Possessed
    - Invasion of the Neptune Men (Japan)
  - 20 July
    - Whistle Down the Wind
  - 26 July
    - Tammy Tell Me True
    - Two Rode Together
  - 30 July
    - Mothra (Japan)
  - 31 July
    - And Love Has Vanished (Yugoslavia)
- August 1961
  - 9 August
    - Come September
    - The Frightened City
  - 12 August
    - The Pit and the Pendulum
  - 15 August
    - Marines, Let's Go
  - 23 August
    - The Fascist (Italy)
    - The Honeymoon Machine
    - The Young Doctors
  - 25 August
    - Ada
    - Gunga Jumna (India)
  - 26 August
    - The Houseguest and My Mother (South Korea)
  - 29 August
    - The Black Monocle (France)
  - 30 August
    - Victim
  - 31 August
    - Accattone (Italy)
- September 1961
  - 4 September
    - Peace to Him Who Enters (USSR)
  - 6 September
    - A Woman Is a Woman (France)
  - 8 September
    - Harry and the Butler (Denmark)
    - Striped Trip (USSR)
  - 15 September
    - A Taste of Honey
  - 16 September
    - Immortal Love (Japan)
  - 20 September
    - Claudelle Inglish
    - Man-Trap
    - Nefertiti, Queen of the Nile (Italy)
  - 21 September
    - The Fabulous Baron Munchausen (Czechoslovakia)
  - 22 September
    - Léon Morin, Priest (France)
  - 25 September
    - The Hustler
  - 26 September
    - Murder, She Said
    - A Thunder of Drums
  - 27 September
    - Paris Blues
  - 30 September
    - Then Nilavu (India)

=== October–December ===
- October 1961
  - 5 October
    - Breakfast at Tiffany's
  - 8 October
    - The Last War (Japan)
  - 10 October
    - Splendor in the Grass
  - 11 October
    - Back Street
    - The Explosive Generation
    - King of Kings
  - 16 October
    - Through a Glass Darkly (Sweden)
  - 17 October
    - Bridge to the Sun
    - What a Whopper
  - 18 October
    - The Devil at 4 O'Clock
    - Mr. Sardonicus
    - West Side Story
  - 21 October
    - Dersu Uzala (USSR)
    - Il Posto (Italy)
  - 23 October
    - Johnny Nobody
  - 26 October
    - The Last Judgment (Italy)
  - 28 October
    - The Mask
  - 29 October
    - The End of Summer (Japan)
- November 1961
  - 1 November
    - The Comancheros
  - 2 November
    - Bachelor in Paradise
  - 8 November
    - Susan Slade
    - Too Late Blues
  - 9 November
    - Flower Drum Song
  - 16 November
    - Hercules in the Haunted World (Italy)
    - Summer and Smoke
  - 22 November
    - Blue Hawaii
    - The George Raft Story
    - Valley of the Dragons
  - 23 November
    - The Day the Earth Caught Fire
  - 24 November
    - The Innocents
  - 28 November
    - The Errand Boy
- December 1961
  - 6 December
    - El Cid (U.S./Italy)
    - Tintin and the Golden Fleece (France)
  - 7 December
    - Five Minutes to Live
  - 13 December
    - Paris Belongs to Us
    - The Young Ones
  - 14 December
    - Babes in Toyland
    - Judgment at Nuremberg
    - The Outsider
  - 15 December
    - One, Two, Three
  - 19 December
    - The Children's Hour
    - A Difficult Life (Italy)
    - Pocketful of Miracles
    - When the Trees Were Tall (USSR)
  - 20 December
    - Cash on Demand
    - Divorce Italian Style (Italy)
    - Everything's Ducky
    - Lover Come Back
    - Mysterious Island
    - Sail a Crooked Ship
    - Something Wild
  - 22 December
    - The Second Time Around
    - Two Women(Italy/West Germany)
  - 23 December
    - Barabbas (Italy)
  - 27 December
    - A Majority of One
  - 28 December
    - Flight of the Lost Balloon
  - 30 December
    - The Steamroller and the Violin (USSR)

== Notable films released in 1961 ==
US unless stated

=== A ===
- The Absent-Minded Professor, starring Fred MacMurray
- Accattone, directed by Pier Paolo Pasolini – (Italy)
- Ada, starring Dean Martin and Susan Hayward
- All in a Night's Work, starring Dean Martin and Shirley MacLaine
- The American Beauty (La Belle Américaine), directed by and starring Robert Dhéry – (France)
- Ana Wa Banati, starring Salah Zulfikar, Zaki Rostom and Fayza Ahmed – (Egypt)
- And Love Has Vanished (Dvoje) – (Yugoslavia)
- Angel Baby, starring Salome Jens and Mercedes McCambridge
- Antigone, starring Irene Papas – (Greece)
- Armored Command, starring Howard Keel and Tina Louise
- The Artillery Sergeant Kalen (Ogniomistrz Kaleń) – (Poland)
- The Assassin (L'Assassino), starring Marcello Mastroianni – (Italy)
- Atlantis, the Lost Continent, starring John Dall

=== B ===
- Babes in Toyland, starring Ray Bolger, Tommy Sands, Annette Funicello
- Bachelor in Paradise, starring Bob Hope, Lana Turner, Janis Paige, Jim Hutton, Paula Prentiss
- Back Street, starring Susan Hayward, John Gavin, Vera Miles
- Bandits of Orgosolo (Banditi a Orgosolo) – (Italy)
- Barabbas, starring Anthony Quinn, Silvana Mangano and Jack Palance – (Italy)
- The Big Bankroll, aka King of the Roaring 20s, starring David Janssen, Mickey Rooney, Diana Dors
- The Big Gamble, starring Stephen Boyd
- The Black Monocle (Le monocle noir), directed by Georges Lautner
- Black Silk (Prae Dum) – (Thailand)
- Blast of Silence, directed by and starring Allen Baron
- The Blonde from Buenos Aires (Una Americana en Buenos Aires), starring Mamie Van Doren and Jean-Pierre Aumont – (Argentina/France)
- Blue Hawaii, starring Elvis Presley (his biggest box-office success), with Joan Blackman and Angela Lansbury
- Boatmen of Thessaloniki (Солунските Атентатори) – (Yugoslavia)
- A Bomb Was Stolen (S-a furat o bombă) – (Romania)
- Moonshiners (Samogonshchiki) – (USSR)
- Breakfast at Tiffany's, directed by Blake Edwards, starring Audrey Hepburn, George Peppard, Patricia Neal, Buddy Ebsen
- Bridge to the Sun, starring Carroll Baker and James Shigeta – (France/U.S.)
- By Love Possessed, starring Lana Turner, Efrem Zimbalist, Jr., George Hamilton

=== C ===
- Carry On Regardless, starring Sid James, Kenneth Connor and Charles Hawtrey – (U.K.)
- Cash on Demand, starring Peter Cushing and André Morell – (U.K.)
- On The Tiger's Back (A cavallod della tigre ), starring Nino Manfredi – (Italy)
- The Children's Hour, starring Audrey Hepburn, Shirley MacLaine, James Garner and Miriam Hopkins
- Chronicle of Flaming Years (Povest plamennykh let) – (USSR)
- Claudelle Inglish, starring Diane McBain and Arthur Kennedy
- The Coachman (Mabu) – (South Korea)
- The Colossus of Rhodes, directed by Sergio Leone, starring Rory Calhoun – (Italy)
- The Comancheros, starring John Wayne, Stuart Whitman, Lee Marvin and Ina Balin
- Come September, starring Rock Hudson, Gina Lollobrigida, Sandra Dee and Bobby Darin
- The Connection, directed by Shirley Clarke
- Cry for Happy, starring Glenn Ford, Miyoshi Umeki and Donald O'Connor
- The Curse of the Werewolf, starring Clifford Evans and Oliver Reed – (U.K.)

=== D ===
- The Day the Earth Caught Fire, starring Edward Judd – (U.K.)
- The Deadly Companions, directed by Sam Peckinpah, starring Maureen O'Hara and Brian Keith
- Dersu Uzala – (USSR)
- The Devil at 4 O'Clock, directed by Mervyn LeRoy, starring Frank Sinatra, Spencer Tracy, Grégoire Aslan
- A Difficult Life (Una vita difficile), directed by Dino Risi, starring Alberto Sordi – (Italy)
- Divorce Italian Style (Divorzio all'italiana), directed by Pietro Germi, starring Marcello Mastroianni – (Italy)
- Dondi, starring David Janssen

=== E ===
- El Cid, directed by Anthony Mann, starring Charlton Heston and Sophia Loren – (U.S./Italy)
- The End of Summer (Kohayagawa-ke no aki), directed by Yasujirō Ozu – (Japan)
- The End of the Cancageiros (A Morte Comanda o Cangaço) – (Brazil)
- The Errand Boy, directed by and starring Jerry Lewis
- Everything's Ducky, starring Buddy Hackett
- The Exiles – documentary
- The Explosive Generation, starring William Shatner and Patty McCormack

=== F ===
- Fanny, starring Charles Boyer and Leslie Caron
- The Fascist (Il federale), starring Ugo Tognazzi – (Italy)
- A Fever in the Blood, starring Efrem Zimbalist, Jr., Angie Dickinson, Don Ameche and Jack Kelly
- Five Golden Hours, starring Robert Wagner, Cyd Charisse, Ernie Kovacs
- Five Minutes to Live, starring Johnny Cash
- Flight of the Lost Balloon, directed by Nathan Juran and starring Mala Powers and Marshall Thompson
- Flooded Out (Los inundados), directed by Fernando Birri – (Argentina)
- Flower Drum Song, starring Nancy Kwan
- Francis of Assisi, directed by Michael Curtiz, starring Bradford Dillman and Dolores Hart
- The Frightened City, starring Sean Connery, John Gregson, Yvonne Romain

=== G ===
- Garibaldi (Viva l'Italia!), directed by Roberto Rossellini – (Italy)
- The George Raft Story, starring Jayne Mansfield and Ray Danton
- Gidget Goes Hawaiian, starring Deborah Walley
- The Girl on the Boat, starring Norman Wisdom – (U.K.)
- Girl with a Suitcase (La Ragazza con la valigia), starring Claudia Cardinale – (Italy)
- Go Naked in the World, starring Gina Lollobrigida and Anthony Franciosa – (Italy)
- Goliath Against the Giants (Goliath contro i giganti), directed by Guido Malatesta – (Italy)
- Goodbye Again, starring Ingrid Bergman and Yves Montand – (France/U.S.)
- Gorgo, starring Bill Travers – (U.K.)
- The Great Impostor, starring Tony Curtis
- The Greengage Summer, starring Kenneth More and Susannah York – (U.K.)
- Gunga Jumna, starring Dilip Kumar and Vyjayanthimala – (India)
- The Guns of Navarone, directed by J. Lee Thompson, starring Gregory Peck, David Niven and Anthony Quinn – (U.K.)

=== H ===
- Harry and the Butler (Harry og kammertjeneren) – (Denmark)
- Havoc in Heaven (aka The Monkey King), an animated films – (China)
- Hercules and the Conquest of Atlantis, (Ercole alla conquista di Atlantide), directed by Vittorio Cottafavi – (Italy)
- Hercules in the Haunted World (Ercole al centro della terra), directed by Mario Bava – (Italy)
- His and Hers, directed by Brian Desmond Hurst, starring Terry-Thomas and Janette Scott – (U.K.)
- Hogs and Warships (Buta to gunkan), directed by Shohei Imamura – (Japan)
- Homicidal, directed by William Castle
- The Honeymoon Machine, starring Steve McQueen, Brigid Bazlen, Jim Hutton, Paula Prentiss
- The Hoodlum Priest, starring Don Murray
- The Human Condition (Ningen no jōken), directed by Masaki Kobayashi – (Japan)
- The Houseguest and My Mother (Sarangbang sonnimgwa eomeoni) – (South Korea)
- The Hustler, directed by Robert Rossen, starring Paul Newman, Piper Laurie, George C. Scott, Jackie Gleason

=== I ===
- Immortal Love (Eien no hito) – (Japan)
- The Innocents, starring Deborah Kerr – (U.K.)

=== J ===
- Jhumroo, starring Madhubala and Kishore Kumar – (India)
- Johnny Nobody, directed by and starring Nigel Patrick – (U.K.)
- Judgment at Nuremberg, directed by Stanley Kramer, starring Spencer Tracy, Burt Lancaster, Marlene Dietrich, Maximilian Schell, Judy Garland, Montgomery Clift, Richard Widmark, William Shatner

=== K ===
- King of Kings, directed by Nicholas Ray, starring Jeffrey Hunter, Robert Ryan, Siobhán McKenna, Hurd Hatfield, Rita Gam, Rip Torn
- The Knife (Het Mes), directed by Fons Rademakers – (Netherlands)

=== L ===
- The Ladies Man, directed by and starring Jerry Lewis
- The Last Judgment (Il Giudizio universale), directed by Vittorio De Sica – (Italy)
- The Last Sunset, starring Rock Hudson, Kirk Douglas, Dorothy Malone, Joseph Cotten, Carol Lynley
- The Last Time I Saw Archie, starring Robert Mitchum and Jack Webb
- The Last War (Sekai Daisensō) – (Japan)
- Last Year at Marienbad (L'Année dernière à Marienbad), directed by Alain Resnais, starring Delphine Seyrig – Golden Lion winner – (France)
- Léon Morin, Priest (Léon Morin, prêtre), starring Jean-Paul Belmondo – (France)
- Lola, directed by Jacques Demy, starring Anouk Aimée – (France)
- The Long Absence (Une aussi longue absence), directed by Henri Colpi – (France)
- The Long and the Short and the Tall, starring Laurence Harvey and Richard Harris – (U.K.)
- Look in Any Window, starring Paul Anka and Ruth Roman
- The Lovemakers (La Viaccia), starring Claudia Cardinale and Jean-Paul Belmondo – (Italy)
- Lover Come Back, starring Doris Day and Rock Hudson

=== M ===
- Mad Dog Coll, directed by Burt Balaban and starring John Davis Chandler
- A Majority of One, starring Rosalind Russell and Alec Guinness
- Man-Trap, starring Jeffrey Hunter, David Janssen and Stella Stevens
- Marines, Let's Go, starring Tom Tryon and David Hedison
- The Mark, starring Stuart Whitman and Maria Schell – (U.K.)
- The Marriage-Go-Round, starring James Mason and Julie Newmar
- The Mask, starring Paul Stevens – (Canada)
- Master of the World, directed by William Witney, starring Vincent Price and Charles Bronson
- The Miracle of Father Malachia (Das Wunder des Malachias), directed by Bernhard Wicki – (West Germany)
- The Misfits, directed by John Huston, starring Marilyn Monroe, Clark Gable and Montgomery Clift
- Mother Joan of the Angels (Matka Joanna od Aniołów), directed by Jerzy Kawalerowicz – (Poland)
- Mothra, directed by Ishirō Honda – (Japan)
- Mr. Sardonicus, directed by William Castle
- Mr. Topaze (a.k.a. I Like Money), directed by and starring Peter Sellers – (U.K.)
- Murder, She Said, directed by George Pollock and starring Margaret Rutherford – (U.K.)
- Mysterious Island, starring Michael Craig, Michael Callan and Joan Greenwood

=== N ===
- The Naked Edge, starring Gary Cooper (in his final film) and Deborah Kerr
- Nazrana (Gift), starring Raj Kapoor and Vyjayanthimala – (India)
- Nefertiti, Queen of the Nile (Nefertiti, regina del Nilo), starring Jeanne Crain and Vincent Price – (Italy)
- No Love for Johnnie, starring Peter Finch – (U.K.)
- La Notte (The Night), directed by Michelangelo Antonioni, starring Marcello Mastroianni and Jeanne Moreau – Golden Bear winner – (Italy/France)
- Nude on the Moon, directed by Doris Wishman

=== O ===
- One-Eyed Jacks, directed by and starring Marlon Brando, with Karl Malden, Katy Jurado, Ben Johnson
- One Hundred and One Dalmatians, featuring the voices of Rod Taylor and Betty Lou Gerson
- One, Two, Three, directed by Billy Wilder, starring James Cagney, Horst Buchholz, Pamela Tiffin, Arlene Francis
- The Outsider, a biography starring Tony Curtis as World War II Marine Ira Hayes

=== P ===
- The Parent Trap, starring Hayley Mills, Maureen O'Hara and Brian Keith
- Paris Belongs to Us (Paris nous appartient), directed by Jacques Rivette – (France)
- Paris Blues, starring Sidney Poitier, Paul Newman, Joanne Woodward and Diahann Carroll
- Parrish, starring Troy Donahue, Connie Stevens, Claudette Colbert
- Peace to Him Who Enters (Mir vkhodyashchemu) – (USSR)
- Pigs and Battleships (Buta to gunkan), directed by Shohei Imamura – (Japan)
- The Pit and the Pendulum, starring Vincent Price
- Plácido, directed by Luis García Berlanga – (Spain)
- Please, Not Now! (La bride sur le cou), starring Brigitte Bardot – (France)
- The Pleasure of His Company, starring Fred Astaire and Debbie Reynolds
- Pocketful of Miracles, final film of director Frank Capra, starring Bette Davis, Glenn Ford, Hope Lange and Arthur O'Connell
- Portrait of a Mobster, starring Vic Morrow
- Posse from Hell, directed by Herbert Coleman, starring Audie Murphy and John Saxon
- Il posto, directed by Ermanno Olmi – (Italy)
- Professor Mamlock, directed by Konrad Wolf – (East Germany)

=== Q ===
- Question 7, directed by Stuart Rosenberg – (U.S./West Germany)

=== R ===
- A Raisin in the Sun, starring Sidney Poitier and Ruby Dee
- The Rebel, starring Tony Hancock – (U.K.)
- Return to Peyton Place, directed by José Ferrer, starring Carol Lynley, Tuesday Weld and Eleanor Parker
- The Right Approach, starring Martha Hyer, Frankie Vaughan and Juliet Prowse
- Romanoff and Juliet, starring Peter Ustinov and Sandra Dee
- The Roman Spring of Mrs. Stone, starring Vivien Leigh and Warren Beatty – (U.K.)

=== S ===
- Sail a Crooked Ship, starring Ernie Kovacs, Robert Wagner, Dolores Hart and Frank Gorshin
- Sanctuary, starring Lee Remick and Yves Montand
- Scarlet Sails (Алые Паруса), directed by Alexandr Ptushko – (USSR)
- The Second Time Around, starring Debbie Reynolds, Andy Griffith and Juliet Prowse
- The Secret Ways, starring Richard Widmark
- Seetarama Kalyanam, directed by and starring N. T. Rama Rao – (India)
- Sennin Buraku (Hermit Village) – (Japan)
- The Sins of Rachel Cade, starring Angie Dickinson
- A Soldier's Prayer (Ningen no jôken), directed by Masaki Kobayashi – (Japan)
- Something Wild, starring Carroll Baker and Ralph Meeker
- A Song About the Gray Pigeon (Piesen o sivém holubovi), directed by Stanislav Barabáš – (Czechoslovakia)
- Splendor in the Grass, starring Natalie Wood and Warren Beatty
- Spotlight on a Murderer (Pleins feux sur l'assassin), directed by Georges Franju – (France)
- The Steamroller and the Violin (Katok i skripka), directed by Andrei Tarkovsky – (USSR)
- A Storm of Love, starring Salah Zulfikar and Nahed Sherif – (Egypt)
- Summer and Smoke, starring Geraldine Page and Laurence Harvey
- Susan Slade, starring Troy Donahue and Connie Stevens

=== T ===
- Tammy Tell Me True, starring Sandra Dee
- Taste of Fear, starring Susan Strasberg – (U.K.)
- Taxi for Tobruk (Un taxi pour Tobrouk), directed by Denys de La Patellière – (France)
- Then Nilavu (Honeymoon), starring Gemini Ganesan and Vyjayanthimala – (India)
- A Taste of Honey, directed by Tony Richardson, starring Rita Tushingham – (U.K.)
- That's What Love Is, directed by Mahmoud Zulfikar, starring Salah Zulfikar, Sabah – (Egypt)
- The Terror of the Tongs, starring Geoffrey Toone, Christopher Lee and Yvonne Monlaur – (U.K.)
- Three Daughters (Teen Kanya), directed by Satyajit Ray – (India)
- Through a Glass Darkly (Såsom i en spegel), directed by Ingmar Bergman – (Sweden)
- A Thunder of Drums, starring Richard Boone, George Hamilton and Luana Patten
- Tintin and the Golden Fleece (Tintin et le mystère de la toison d'or), directed by Jean-Jacques Vierne – (France)
- Too Late Blues, starring Bobby Darin
- Town Without Pity (Stadt ohne Mitleid), directed by Gottfried Reinhardt and starring Kirk Douglas – (U.S./West Germany/Switzerland)
- Two Living, One Dead, directed by Anthony Asquith, starring Patrick McGoohan – (U.K./Sweden)
- Two Loves, starring Shirley MacLaine
- Two Rode Together, starring James Stewart and Richard Widmark

=== U ===
- Underworld U.S.A., directed by Samuel Fuller, starring Cliff Robertson

=== V ===
- Valley of the Dragons
- Victim, directed by Basil Dearden, starring Dirk Bogarde and Sylvia Syms – (U.K.)
- Violent Life (Una vita violenta) – (Italy)
- Viridiana, directed by Luis Buñuel – Palme d'Or winner – (Mexico/Spain)
- Voyage to the Bottom of the Sea, starring Walter Pidgeon, Joan Fontaine, Robert Sterling, Peter Lorre, Barbara Eden

=== W ===
- We Were Young (A byahme mladi) – (Bulgaria)
- West Side Story, starring Natalie Wood, Richard Beymer, Russ Tamblyn, Rita Moreno, George Chakiris
- What A Whopper, directed by Gilbert Gunn, starring Adam Faith, Sidney James, Carole Lesley and Terence Longdon – (U.K.)
- When the Trees Were Tall (Kogda derevya byli bolshimi) – (USSR)
- Whistle Down the Wind, directed by Bryan Forbes, starring Hayley Mills and Alan Bates – (U.K.)
- Wife Number 13 (Al zouga talattashar) – (Egypt)
- Wild in the Country, starring Elvis Presley with Hope Lange, Tuesday Weld, Millie Perkins
- A Woman Is a Woman (Une Femme est une femme), directed by Jean-Luc Godard, starring Jean-Paul Belmondo and Anna Karina – (France)

=== Y ===
- Yojimbo, directed by Akira Kurosawa, starring Toshiro Mifune – (Japan)
- The Young Doctors, starring Ben Gazzara and Dick Clark
- The Young Ones, starring Cliff Richard and The Shadows – (U.K.)
- The Young Savages, starring Burt Lancaster and Dina Merrill

== Short film series ==
- Looney Tunes (1930–1969)
- Terrytoons (1930–1964)
- Merrie Melodies (1931–1969)
- Goofy (1961)
- Tom and Jerry (1940–1967)
- Noveltoons (1943–1967)
- Loopy De Loop (1959–1965)
- The Alvin Show (1961–1962)

== Births ==
- January 2
  - Neil Dudgeon, English actor
  - Todd Haynes, American director
  - Paula Hamilton, English model and actress
- January 4 - Graham McTavish, Scottish actor
- January 8 - Julian Firth, English actor
- January 9 - Candi Milo, American actress, voice actress and singer
- January 10
  - Evan Handler, American actor
  - Mark Venturini, American actor (died 1996)
- January 12 - Simon Russell Beale, English actor
- January 13 - Julia Louis-Dreyfus, American actress
- January 17 - Brian Helgeland, American screenwriter, producer and directoe
- January 18 - Bob Peterson, American animator, director, screenwriter and voice actor
- January 20 - Janey Godley, Scottish comedian and actress (died 2024)
- January 24 – Nastassja Kinski, German actress
- January 25 - Roger Yuan, American martial artist, stunt coordinator/performer and actor
- February 5 - Tim Meadows, American actor and comedian
- February 10 - Alexander Payne, American filmmaker
- February 11 – Carey Lowell, American actress
- February 13 - Henry Rollins, American singer, writer, actor, comedian and presenter
- February 17 - Tuesday Knight, American actress and singer
- February 20 - Imogen Stubbs, English actress and writer
- February 21
  - Christopher Atkins, American actor
  - Martha Hackett, American actress
- February 23 - David Warshofsky, American actor
- February 24
  - Kasi Lemmons, American director, screenwriter and actress
  - Emilio Rivera, American actor and stand-up comedian
- February 28
  - Rae Dawn Chong, Canadian-American actress
  - Mark Ferguson, Australian actor
- March 4 – Steven Weber, American actor
- March 8 – Camryn Manheim, American actress
- March 11
  - Elias Koteas, Canadian actor
  - Greg Kramer, British-Canadian actor and director (died 2013)
- March 14 - Penny Johnson Jerald, American actress
- March 17
  - Dana Reeve, American actress and singer (died 2006)
  - Casey Siemaszko, American actor
- March 21 – Kassie DePaiva, American actress and singer
- March 25
  - John Stockwell, American actor, director, producer and writer
  - Aron Warner, American producer and voice actor
- March 29 - Amy Sedaris, American actress, comedian and writer
- March 31 - Gary Winick, American filmmaker (died 2011)
- April 2 - Christopher Meloni, American actor
- April 3 – Eddie Murphy, American actor and comedian
- April 5 - Lisa Zane, American actress and singer
- April 6 – Gene Eugene, Canadian actor, lead singer of Adam Again (died 2000)
- April 10 - Lorraine Ashbourne, English actress
- April 12 - Magda Szubanski, Australian comedy actress
- April 14 – Robert Carlyle, Scottish actor
- April 18
  - Jane Leeves, English actress
  - Joe Whyte, American actor
- April 20
  - Nicholas Lyndhurst, English actor
  - Mike Pniewski, American actor
- April 21
  - Cathy Cavadini, American voice actress
  - Kate Vernon, Canadian-born American actress
- April 23
  - Þröstur Leó Gunnarsson, Icelandic actor
  - George Lopez, American comedian and actor
- May 2 - Beeban Kidron, British filmmaker
- May 6
  - George Clooney American actor, writer, director and producer
  - Wally Wingert, American actor, voice actor, singer and former radio personality
- May 8 – David Winning, Canadian-American director, producer and screenwriter
- May 9 - John Corbett, American actor and singer
- May 12 - Lar Park Lincoln, American actress (died 2025)
- May 13 - Siobhan Fallon Hogan, American actress and comedian
- May 14 – Tim Roth, English actor
- May 16 - Kevin McDonald, Canadian actor, voice actor and comedian
- May 17
  - Corey Johnson, American character actor
  - Bruce Thomas, American actor
- May 20 - Owen Teale, Welsh character actor
- May 21 - Brent Briscoe, American character actor and screenwriter (died 2017)
- May 22 - Ann Cusack, American actress and singer
- May 23 - Karen Duffy, American writer, television personality and actress
- May 26 - Tarsem Singh, Indian director
- May 30 – Harry Enfield, English actor, comedian, writer and director.
- May 31 – Lea Thompson, American actress
- June 2 – Liam Cunningham, Irish actor
- June 4
  - Karin Konoval, Canadian-American actress
  - Julie White, American actress
- June 5 – Mary Kay Bergman, American voice actress and voice-over teacher (died 1999)
- June 6 - Sydney Walsh, American actress
- June 9
  - Michael J. Fox, Canadian actor
  - Aaron Sorkin, American screenwriter, actor, writer, producer and director
- June 13 - Bruce Thomas, American actor
- June 15 - Jim Hanks, American actor and filmmaker
- June 22 - Pietro Sarubbi, Italian actor and writer
- June 24 - Iain Glen, Scottish actor
- June 25
  - Timur Bekmambetov, Russian-Kazakh director, producer and screenwriter
  - Ricky Gervais, English comedian, actor, writer, producer and director
- June 27
  - Meera Syal, English comedian, writer, singer and actress
  - Tim Whitnall, English playwright, screenwriter and actor
- July 1 - Ivan Kaye, English actor and producer
- July 9 – Raymond Cruz, American actor
- July 10 - Ian Mercer, English actor
- July 12 - Caroline Bliss, English actress
- July 14 – Jackie Earle Haley, American actor
- July 15
  - Lolita Davidovich, Canadian actress
  - Forest Whitaker, American actor
- July 17 - Anthony Lee, American actor (died 2000)
- July 18 – Elizabeth McGovern, American actress
- July 19 - Campbell Scott, American actor, producer and director
- July 21 - Kym Whitley, American comedian and actress
- July 23 – Woody Harrelson, American actor
- July 28 - Debi Sue Voorhees, American actress
- July 30 – Laurence Fishburne, American actor
- August 3 - Molly Hagan, American actress
- August 4 - Lauren Tom, American actress
- August 5
  - Tawny Kitaen, American actress and model (died 2021)
  - Janet McTeer, English actress
- August 7 - Maggie Wheeler, American actress
- August 14
  - John Hillcoat, Australian director and screenwriter
  - Susan Olsen, American actress and radio host
- August 16
  - Elpidia Carrillo, Mexican actress and director
  - Noam Murro, Israeli director and producer
- August 18 - Glenn Plummer, American actor
- August 19 - Tony Longo, American actor (died 2015)
- August 20
  - Linda Manz, American actress (died 2020)
  - Joe Pasquale, English comedian, actor and television personality
  - Stanley Townsend, Irish actor
- August 21
  - Eric Darnell, American animator, storyboard artist, director, writer and voice actor
  - Stephen Hillenburg, American animator, writer, producer, director, marine science educator and creator of SpongeBob SquarePants (died 2018)
- August 22 - Stephen Stanton, American actor, voice actor, comedian and visual effects artist
- August 23 - Michael "Bear" Taliferro, American actor, sportsman and singer (died 2006)
- August 24 - Jared Harris, British actor
- August 25
  - Ally Walker, American actress
  - Joanne Whalley, English actress
- August 27
  - Tom Ford, American filmmaker
  - Tim Johnson, American director and producer
- August 28 – Jennifer Coolidge, American actress
- August 30 - Ely Pouget, American actress
- August 31 - Leonard L. Thomas, American actor
- September 1 - Brian Markinson, American actor
- September 2
  - Eugenio Derbez, Mexican actor, comedian and filmmaker
  - Anthony Wong, Hong Kong actor and director
- September 9 - Steven Eckholdt, American actor
- September 11
  - E. G. Daily, American actress
  - Virginia Madsen, American actress
- September 15
  - Noel MacNeal, American actor, director, puppeteer and writer
  - Colin McFarlane, English actor
- September 18
  - Andrew Airlie, Canadian actor
  - James Gandolfini, American actor (died 2013)
- September 20
  - Morwenna Banks, British comedy actress, writer and producer
  - James Colby, American actor (died 2018)
- September 21 - Nancy Travis, American actress
- September 22 – Bonnie Hunt, American actress and comedian
- September 23 - Chi McBride, American actor
- September 25 - Heather Locklear, American actress
- September 28 - Gregory Jbara, American actor and singer
- September 29 - Dale Dickey, American character actress
- September 30 - Eric Stoltz, American actor, director and producer
- October 1 - Steve Purcell, American cartoonist, animator, game designer, and voice actor
- October 4 - Kazuki Takahashi, Japanese author and creator of Yu-Gi-Oh! (died 2022)
- October 7 - Paula Newsome, American actress
- October 8 - Shira Piven, American director, actress and producer
- October 10 - Jodi Benson, American actress, voice actress and singer
- October 16
  - Tonye Patano, American actress
  - Randy Vasquez, American actor and director
  - Kim Wayans, American actress and comedian
- October 17 - John Okafor, Nigerian actor and comedian (died 2024)
- October 20 – Michie Tomizawa, Japanese actress, voice actress and singer
- October 26 – Dylan McDermott, American actor
- October 27 - Joanna Scanlan, British actress and screenwriter
- October 31 – Peter Jackson, New Zealand director
- November 1 - Lauren-Marie Taylor, American actress
- November 3 - Lee Montgomery, Canadian actor
- November 4 – Ralph Macchio, American actor
- November 5
  - Gina Mastrogiacomo, American actress (died 2001)
  - Philip Moon, American actor of Asian descent
- November 8 - John Costelloe, American actor (died 2008)
- November 14 – D. B. Sweeney, American actor
- November 18 - Nick Chinlund, American actor
- November 19 – Meg Ryan, American actress
- November 22 – Mariel Hemingway, American actress
- November 24 - Robin Stille, American actress (died 1996)
- November 25 - Simon Fisher-Becker, British actor (died 2025)
- November 27
  - Samantha Bond, English actress
  - Rebecca Ferratti, American model and actress
  - Steve Oedekerk, American actor, stand-up comedian, director, editor, producer and screenwriter
  - Kurt Max Runte, Canadian actor
- November 28
  - Alfonso Cuarón, Mexican director
  - Martin Clunes, English actor, comedian, director and television presenter
  - Neil Mullarkey, English actor, writer and comedian
- November 29
  - Kim Delaney, American actress
  - Tom Sizemore, American actor (died 2023)
- December 1 - Jeremy Northam, English actor and singer
- December 6 - Colin Salmon, British actor
- December 11 - Kimberly Scott, American actress
- December 14 - Fredrik Dolk, Swedish actor
- December 16
  - Shane Black, American filmmaker and actor
  - Sam Robards, American actor
  - LaChanze, American actress and singer
  - Jon Tenney, American actor
- December 24 - Spike Brandt, American director, animator, writer and voice actor
- December 26 - John Lynch, Irish actor
- December 27 - Philippa Lowthorpe, English director

== Deaths ==
- January 13 – Blanche Ring, 89, American singer and actress, The Yankee Girl, It's the Old Army Game
- January 14 – Barry Fitzgerald, 72, Irish actor, Going My Way, The Quiet Man
- February 2 – Anna May Wong, 56, American actress, Shanghai Express, The Thief of Bagdad
- February 15 – Jack Whiting, 59, American actor, singer and dancer, Sailing Along, Give Me a Sailor
- February 17 – Nita Naldi, 66, American actress, Blood and Sand, Dr. Jekyll and Mr. Hyde
- February 26 – Harry Bannister, 71, American actor, The Girl of the Golden West
- March 6 – George Formby, 56, British actor, entertainer, It's in the Air, Off the Dole
- March 12 – Belinda Lee, 25, British actress, Long Night in 1943, The Goddess of Love (automobile accident)
- March 14 – Lies Noor, 17, Indonesian actress, Pulang (encephalitis)
- March 29 – Fritzi Ridgeway, 62, American actress, Ruggles of Red Gap, This Is Heaven
- April 27 – Roy Del Ruth, 67, American director, The Maltese Falcon, Broadway Melody of 1938
- May 4 – Anita Stewart, 66, American silent-film actress, The Combat, The Suspect
- May 13 – Gary Cooper, 60, American actor, High Noon, Meet John Doe, The Pride of the Yankees, Sergeant York
- May 18 – Henry O'Neill, 69, American actor, Shadow of the Thin Man, Anchors Aweigh
- May 19 – Ben Corbett, 69, American actor, The Fighting Renegade, Six-Gun Trail
- May 22
  - Edward F. Cline, 69, American director, You Can't Cheat an Honest Man, Never Give a Sucker an Even Break
  - Joan Davis, 53, American actress, Hold That Ghost, If You Knew Susie
- June 2 – George S. Kaufman, 71, American playwright, A Night at the Opera
- June 10 – Vivienne Osborne, 64, American actress, Supernatural, Luxury Liner
- June 14 – Eddie Polo, 86, Austrian-American actor, The Vanishing Dagger
- June 15 – Luther Reed, 72, American director, Rio Rita, Hit the Deck
- June 17 – Jeff Chandler, 42, American actor, Broken Arrow, Merrill's Marauders
- June 27 – Paul Guilfoyle, 58, American actor, Winterset, The Grapes of Wrath
- June 30 – Lee de Forest, 87, American inventor of Phonofilm
- July 4 – Franklyn Farnum, 83, American actor, The Life of Emile Zola, The Lost Weekend, The Greatest Show on Earth
- July 9 – Alan Marshal, 52, Australian actor, The Adventures of Sherlock Holmes, House on Haunted Hill
- July 23 – Valentine Davies, 55, American screenwriter and director, The Glenn Miller Story, The Benny Goodman Story
- July 28 – Harry Gribbon, 76, American silent comedy actor, Fatty and Mabel at the San Diego Exposition, Down on the Farm, A Small Town Idol, The Cameraman
- August 4 – Maurice Tourneur, 85, French director, The Last of the Mohicans, The Poor Little Rich Girl
- August 17 – Violet Kemble-Cooper, 74, British actress, The Invisible Ray, David Copperfield
- August 20 – Dorothy Burgess, 54, American actress, In Old Arizona, Black Moon
- August 27 – Gail Russell, 36, American actress, Angel and the Badman, Seven Men from Now
- August 30 – Charles Coburn, 84, American actor, Gentlemen Prefer Blondes, The Lady Eve
- September 10 – Leo Carrillo, 81, American actor, Viva Villa!, Phantom of the Opera
- September 20 – Andrzej Munk, 39, Polish director and screenwriter, Man on the Tracks, Passenger
- September 22 – Marion Davies, 64, American actress, Show People, Cain and Mabel
- September 23
  - John Eldredge, 57, American actor, The Woman in Red, His Brother's Wife
  - Billy House, 72, American actor, Rogues of Sherwood Forest, Bedlam
- September 25 – Frank Fay, 69, American actor, Under a Texas Moon, The Matrimonial Bed
- September 26 – Juanita Hansen, 66, American actress, The Magic Cloak of Oz, The Phantom Foe
- October 1 – Donald Cook, 60, American actor, The Public Enemy, Baby Face
- October 11 – Chico Marx, 74, American actor, member of the Marx Brothers, A Night at the Opera, Duck Soup
- October 13
  - Maya Deren, 44, American experimental filmmaker, Meshes of the Afternoon, At Land
  - Zoltan Korda, 66, Hungarian director, The Four Feathers, Cry, the Beloved Country
- October 18 – Tsuru Aoki, 69, Japanese-born American actress, The Dragon Painter
- October 22 – Joseph Schenck, 82, Russian-born American pioneer motion picture executive, The General, Sherlock Jr.
- October 29 – Astrid Holm, 68, Danish actress, The Phantom Carriage, Häxan
- November 15
  - Elsie Ferguson, 78, American actress, The Witness for the Defense, Scarlet Pages
  - Douglas Walton, 51, Canadian actor, Bride of Frankenstein, Murder, My Sweet
- November 18 – Eduard Tisse, 64, Soviet cinematographer, Battleship Potemkin, Ivan the Terrible
- November 24 – Ruth Chatterton, 68, American actress, Dodsworth, Female
- December 20 – Moss Hart. 57, American playwright, Gentleman's Agreement, A Star Is Born
- December 27 – Bernard McConville, 74, American screenwriter, A Connecticut Yankee in King Arthur's Court, The Phantom of the Opera

== Film debuts ==
- Ann-Margret – Pocketful of Miracles
- Ed Asner – The Murder Men
- Eddie Axberg – The Brig Three Lilies
- Gigi Ballista – A Day for Lionhearts
- Saira Banu – Junglee
- William Berger – Back Street
- Roscoe Lee Browne – The Connection
- John Davis Chandler – Mad Dog Coll
- Sonny Chiba – Invasion of the Neptune Men
- Leonardo Cimino – Mad Dog Coll
- Ria De Simone – Totòtruffa 62
- William Duell – The Hustler
- Keir Dullea – The Hoodlum Priest
- Chad Everett – Claudelle Inglish
- Mimsy Farmer – Gidget Goes Hawaiian
- Louis Gossett Jr. – A Raisin in the Sun
- Gene Hackman – Mad Dog Coll
- Lance Henriksen – The Outsider
- Sammo Hung – Ai de jiao yu
- Anna Karina – A Woman Is a Woman
- George Kennedy – The Little Shepherd of Kingdom Come
- Harvey Korman – Living Venus
- Eddy Mitchell – Daniella by Night
- Dudley Moore – The Third Alibi
- William O'Connell – 20,000 Eyes
- Lance Percival – Three on a Spree
- Joe Pesci – Hey, Let's Twist!
- Burt Reynolds – Angel Baby
- Doris Roberts – Something Wild
- Aldo Sambrell – King of Kings
- Stefania Sandrelli – Gioventù di notte
- Telly Savalas – Mad Dog Coll
- George Segal – The Young Doctors
- Rita Tushingham – A Taste of Honey
- Oleg Vidov – My Friend, Kolka!
- Milena Vukotic – Blood Feud
