= 1961 in the Soviet Union =

- Decades: 1940s; 1950s; 1960s; 1970s; 1980s
- See also: History of the Soviet Union; List of years in the Soviet Union

The following lists events that happened during 1961 in the Union of Soviet Socialist Republics.

== Incumbents ==
- First Secretary of the Communist Party of the Soviet Union - Nikita Khrushchev
- Chairman of the Presidium of the Supreme Soviet of the Soviet Union - Leonid Brezhnev
- Chairman of the Council of Ministers of the Soviet Union - Nikita Khrushchev

== Births ==
- 30 March - Sergei Nozikov, former Russian professional footballer
- 1 June - Yevgeny Prigozhin, mercenary chief

== Deaths ==
- 15 July - Nina Bari, Russian mathematician (b. 1901)
- 4 October - Metropolitan Benjamin (Fedchenkov), Soviet Orthodox missionary and writer, Exarch of Russian Church in North America (b. 1880)

== Events ==
- 1 September - first of the 1961 Soviet nuclear tests
- 13 September - Exhibition of Leningrad artists
- 5 November - 1961 Elbarusovo school fire killed 110 students and teachers.

== See also ==
- 1961 in fine arts of the Soviet Union
- List of Soviet films of 1961
