= List of Japanese films of 1961 =

This is a list of films released in Japan in 1961. In 1961, there were 7231 movie theatres in Japan, with 4991 showing only domestic films and 1468 showing both domestic and imported films. In total, there were 535 Japanese films released in 1961. In total, domestic films grossed 29,445 million yen in 1961.

== List of films ==
Japanese films released in 1961
Title	Japanese Title	Release date	Director	Cast	Genre	Notes
	お役者変化捕物帖 弁天屋敷	1961.01.03	Toshikazu Kōno			
Bullet Holes in the Underworld	暗黒街の弾痕	1961.01.03	Kihachi Okamoto		Yakuza	
Isshin Tasuke: The Shogun and the Fishmonger	家光と彦左と一心太助	1961.01.03	Tadashi Sawashima		Jidai-geki	
	銀座っ子物語	1961.01.03	Umetsugu Inoue			
Shingo's Challenge	新吾二十番勝負	1961.01.03	Sadatsugu Matsuda		Jidai-geki	
	続・性と人間	1961.01.03	Kenta Kimoto, Satoru Kobayashi			
	続々番頭はんと丁稚どん	1961.01.03	Kunio Matoi			
Daredevil in the Castle	大阪城物語	1961.01.03	Hiroshi Inagaki		Jidai-geki / Ninja	
	大出世物語	1961.01.03	Yutaka Abe			
	波濤を越える渡り鳥	1961.01.03	Buichi Saitō			
	猟銃	1961.01.03	Heinosuke Gosho			
Hanakurabe tanuki dochu	花くらべ狸道中	1961.01.03	Tokuzo Tanaka			
Sexy Line	セクシー地帯	1961.01.09	Teruo Ishii	Teruo Yoshida, Yôko Mihara	Crime	
	べらんめえ芸者罷り通る	1961.01.09	Eiichi Koishi			
	俺の血が騒ぐ	1961.01.09	Tokujirō Yamazaki			
	刑事物語 ジャズは狂っちゃいねえ	1961.01.09	Isamu Kosugi			
	縞の背広の親分衆	1961.01.09	Yūzō Kawashima			
Kojiro's Turning Swallow Cut	小次郎燕返し	1961.01.09	Katsuhiko Tasaka		Jidai-geki	
Harekosode	晴小袖	1961.01.09	Kimiyoshi Yasuda		Jidai-geki	
Lord of Steel Heart	鉄火大名	1961.01.09	Kōkichi Uchide		Jidai-geki	
	坊ちゃん野郎勢ぞろい	1961.01.09	Shigeaki Hidaka			
	街から街へつむじ風	1961.01.14	Akinori Matsuo			
	婚期	1961.01.14	Kōzaburō Yoshimura			
	女は夜化粧する	1961.01.14	Umetsugu Inoue			
Case of Umon: The Nanbanzame Murders	右門捕物帖 Case of Umon	1961.01.15	Shigehiro Ozawa		Jidai-geki / Ninja	
Uzu	渦	1961.01.15	Yoshiaki Banshō	Keiji Sada, Mariko Okada, Shima Iwashita, Shin Saburi, Noboru Nakaya		
	俺が地獄の手品師だ	1961.01.15	Shigehiro Ozawa			
	銀座の恋人たち	1961.01.15	Yasuki Chiba			
	女王蜂の逆襲	1961.01.15	Yoshiki Onoda			
	少女	1961.01.15	Kiyoshi Horiike			
	新二等兵物語 めでたく凱旋の巻	1961.01.15	Kinya Sakai			
	大江戸喧嘩まつり	1961.01.15	Daisuke Yamazaki			
	名もなく貧しく美しく	1961.01.15	Zenzō Matsuyama			
	36年大相撲初場所 前半戦	1961.01.18	Torahiko Ise [composition]			
Flowers on the Road	花かご道中	1961.01.21	Eiichi Kudō		Jidai-geki	
The Lord Worth 1000 Ryo	若殿千両肌	1961.01.21	Kōsaku Yamashita		Jidai-geki	
	男の地平線	1961.01.21	Sugio Fujiwara			
	天使が俺を追い駈ける	1961.01.21	Motomu Ida			
	恋愛ズバリ講座 第一話	1961.01.21	Akira Miwa			
	恋愛ズバリ講座 第二話 弱気	1961.01.21	Yoshihiro Ishikawa			
	恋愛ズバリ講座 第三話	1961.01.21	Teruo Ishii			
Pigs and Battleships	豚と軍艦	1961.01.21	Shohei Imamura	Hiroyuki Nagato, Jitsuko Yoshimura, Shiro Osaka	Yakuza	
	愛する	1961.01.22	Tsutomu Kamimura			
	悪の華	1961.01.22	Kazuo Inoue			
	警視庁物語 不在証明	1961.01.26	Shōichi Shimazu			
	腰抜け女兵騒動	1961.01.26	Kōzō Saeki			
	出世コースに進路を取れ	1961.01.26	Masanori Kakei			
Naruto Hicho	鳴門秘帖	1961.01.26	Kōkichi Uchide		Jidai-geki	
	36年大相撲初場所 後半戦	1961.01.27	Torahiko Ise [composition]			
	お奉行さまと娘たち	1961.01.27	Masahiko Izawa		Jidai-geki	
	契約結婚	1961.01.27	Yūsuke Watanabe			
	太平洋のかつぎ屋	1961.01.27	Akinori Matsuo			
Where the Tone River Flows	潮来笠	1961.01.27	Akira Inoue		Jidai-geki	
	夜の挑戦者	1961.01.27	Hiroshi Noguchi			
	恋にいのちを	1961.01.27	Yasuzō Masumura			
	痛快太郎	1961.01.28	Hiroo Ikeda			
A Soldier's Prayer	人間の條件 完結篇	1961.01.28	Masaki Kobayashi	Tatsuya Nakadai, Michiyo Aratama, Taketoshi Naito	War, drama	
	河内風土記 おいろけ説法	1961.02.01	Seiji Hisamatsu			
	警視庁物語 十五才の女	1961.02.01	Shōichi Shimazu			
	手錠にかけた恋	1961.02.01	Haruo Atsuda			
	情無用の罠	1961.02.01	Jun Fukuda			
Tokyo Knights	東京騎士隊	1961.02.01	Seijun Suzuki			
Unruly Lion	尾張の暴れ獅子	1961.02.01	Toshikazu Kōno		Jidai-geki	
	薔薇と龍	1961.02.01	Shunkai Mizuho			
	九千万の明るい瞳	1961.02.02	Nagayoshi Akasaka			
	刑事物語 部長刑事を追え！	1961.02.02	Isamu Kosugi			
	誰よりも金を愛す	1961.02.02	Torajirō Saitō			
Misty Morning Road	朝霧街道	1961.02.02	Tai Katō		Jidai-geki	
Edo Purebred	江戸っ子肌	1961.02.07	Masahiro Makino		Jidai-geki	
	赤い影の男	1961.02.07	Masamitsu Igayama		Yakuza	
	唄は峠を越えて	1961.02.08	Masateru Nishiyama			
	俺はトップ屋だ 顔のない美女	1961.02.08	Motomu Ida			
	若い狼	1961.02.08	Hideo Onchi			
	松川事件	1961.02.08	Satsuo Yamamoto			
Ninjutsu at Osaka Castle	忍術大阪城	1961.02.08	Noboru Ono		Jidai-geki / Ninja	
Nuregami Peony	濡れ髪牡丹	1961.02.08	Tokuzō Tanaka		Jidai-geki	
	風流滑稽譚 仙人部落	1961.02.08	Morihei Magatani			
	紅の拳銃	1961.02.11	Yōichi Ushihara			
	破れかぶれ	1961.02.11	Koreyoshi Kurahara			
	甘い夜の果て	1961.02.14	Yoshishige Yoshida			
	天下の快男児 旋風太郎	1961.02.14	Eijirō Wakabayashi			
	南の風と波	1961.02.14	Shinobu Hashimoto			
	二人だけの太陽	1961.02.14	Shinji Murayama			
	非情の男	1961.02.14	Osamu Takahashi			
	慕情の人	1961.02.14	Seiji Maruyama			
	お嬢さん	1961.02.15	Tarō Yuge			
	新夫婦読本 恋愛病患者	1961.02.15	Hiromu Edagawa			
Mark of Blood	八州血煙り笠	1961.02.15	Kinnosuke Fukada		Jidai-geki	
Koishigure: Chichibu no Yomatsuri	恋しぐれ 秩父の夜祭り	1961.02.15	Tatsuo Yamada		Jidai-geki	
	処刑前夜	1961.02.18	Eisuke Takizawa			
	兵六大臣行状記 魚色のこよみ	1961.02.19	Michio Mori			
My Face Red in the Sunset	夕陽に赤い俺の顔	1961.02.19	Masahiro Shinoda			
Naruto Hicho Conclusion	鳴門秘帖 完結篇	1961.02.19	Kōkichi Uchide		Jidai-geki	
	サラリーマン 奥様心得帖	1961.02.21	Kengo Furusawa			
	赤い影の男 高速三号線を張れ	1961.02.21	Masamitsu Igayama			
	俺は都会の山男	1961.02.22	Yoshiki Onoda			
Assassin's Mansion	刺客屋敷	1961.02.22	Shin Amano		Jidai-geki	
	不敵なる脱出	1961.02.22	Satoru Ainoda			
	俺はトップ屋だ 第二の顔	1961.02.22	Motomu Ida			
Winds and Clouds and a Fortress	風と雲と砦	1961.02.22	Kazuo Mori		Jidai-geki	
	一石二鳥	1961.02.25	Motomu Ida			
	銀座旋風児 嵐が俺を呼んでいる	1961.02.25	Hiroshi Noguchi			
	続サラリーマン忠臣蔵	1961.02.25	Toshio Sugie			
	背広三四郎 男は度胸	1961.02.25	Eiji Iwaki			
	あれが港の灯だ	1961.02.26	Tadashi Imai			
	拳銃野郎に御用心	1961.02.26	Masaharu Segawa			
	もず	1961.03.01	Minoru Shibuya			
	若い仲間	1961.03.01	Kōji Shima			
	太陽を射るもの	1961.03.01	Isao Hara			
	地平線がぎらぎらっ	1961.03.01	Michiyoshi Doi			
	斑女	1961.03.01	Noboru Nakamura			
Kisobushi Sandogasa	木曽ぶし三度笠	1961.03.01	Bin Kato		Jidai-geki	
Yagyu Chronicles 1: The Secret Scrolls	柳生武芸帳	1961.03.01	Masahiko Izawa		Jidai-geki / Ninja	
	性の神々	1961.03.__	Tetsu Takahashi			
Samurai Hawk	旗本喧嘩鷹	1961.03.05	Nobuo Nakagawa		Jidai-geki	
	大暴れマドロス野郎	1961.03.05	Tokujirō Yamazaki			
	花と娘と白い道	1961.03.06	Kenjirō Morinaga			
	若い涙を吹きとばせ	1961.03.07	Tsuneo Kobayashi			
	俺らは空の暴れん坊	1961.03.08	Atsuto Wada			
	新夫婦読本 若奥様は売れっ子	1961.03.08	Sōkichi Tomimoto			
	桃色の超特急	1961.03.08	Yūsuke Watanabe			
Blind Devotion	みだれ髪	1961.03.08	Teinosuke Kinugasa			
	ろくでなし稼業	1961.03.12	Buichi Saitō			
An Edo Magistrate	江戸っ子奉行 天下を斬る男	1961.03.12	Yasushi Sasaki		Jidai-geki	
	青い夜霧の挑戦状	1961.03.12	Kengo Furusawa			
	東京のお転婆娘	1961.03.12	Ren Yoshimura			
	背広三四郎 花の一本背負い	1961.03.12	Eiji Iwaki			
	無鉄砲社員	1961.03.14	Toshirō Suzuki			
	「粘土のお面」より かあちゃん	1961.03.15	Nobuo Nakagawa			
	はったり青年紳士	1961.03.15	Tsuneo Tabata			
	小父さんありがとう	1961.03.15	Mitsuo Wakasugi			
Heiji Zenigata Detective Story: The Devil of the Night	銭形平次捕物控 夜のえんま帖	1961.03.15	Kunio Watanabe		Jidai-geki	
	大学武勇伝	1961.03.15	Satoru Ainoda			
Tenka Ayatsuri-Gumi	天下あやつり組	1961.03.15	Kazuo Ikehiro		Jidai-geki	
	第三捜査命令	1961.03.15	Seiichi Fukuda			
	七人の敵あり	1961.03.18	Toshio Sugie			
	東から来た男	1961.03.18	Umetsugu Inoue			
	ゼロの焦点	1961.03.19	Yoshitarō Nomura			
	でかんしょ風来坊	1961.03.19	Buichi Saitō			
	続こつまなんきん お香の巻	1961.03.19	Tatsuo Sakai			
Yagyu Chronicles 2: The Secret Sword	柳生武芸帳 夜ざくら秘剣	1961.03.19	Masahiko Izawa		Jidai-geki / Ninja	
	この青年にご用心	1961.03.21	Yoshio Inoue			
	花ざかり七色娘	1961.03.21	Shigeaki Hidaka			
Festival of Swordsmen	剣豪天狗まつり	1961.03.21	Shigehiro Ozawa		Jidai-geki	
A Man Who Loved Love	好色一代男	1961.03.21	Yasuzō Masumura		Jidai-geki	
Long Sword in the Night Mist	夜霧の長脇差	1961.03.21	Junji Kurata		Jidai-geki	
	東京の夜は泣いている	1961.03.22	Morihei Magatani			
	無情の夢	1961.03.22	Yoshitsugu Nakajima			
	生きていた野良犬	1961.03.26	Toshio Masuda			
	警察日記 ブタ箱は満員	1961.03.27	Mitsuo Wakasugi			
Golden Peacock Castle Part I	新諸国物語 黄金孔雀城	1961.03.28	Shōji Matsumura		Jidai-geki	
The Ako Retainers	赤穂浪士	1961.03.28	Sadatsugu Matsuda		Jidai-geki	
	福の神 サザエさん一家	1961.03.28	Nobuo Aoyagi			
	海よ俺らの歌に泣け	1961.03.29	Satoshi Taguchi			
	東京新撰組	1961.03.29	Masuichi Iizuka			
Bad Boys	不良少年	1961.03.29	Susumu Hani	Yukio Yamada, Hirokazu Yoshitake, Koichiro Yamazaki		
	柏鵬相搏つ 大相撲春場所	1961.03.30	Torahiko Ise [composition]			
	快人黄色い手袋	1961.04.01	Hirokazu Ichimura			
	早射ち野郎	1961.04.01	Takashi Nomura			
	続々々番頭はんと丁稚どん チャンポン旅行	1961.04.01	Kunio Matoi			
Yorikiri Wakasama	寄切り若様	1961.04.02	Mitsuo Kōzu		Jidai-geki	
	誰よりも誰よりも君を愛す	1961.04.02	Shigeo Tanaka			
	機動捜査班	1961.04.03	Isamu Kosugi			
	特急にっぽん	1961.04.04	Yūzō Kawashima			
	別れて生きるときも	1961.04.04	Hiromichi Horikawa			
To Sing Okesa	おけさ唄えば	1961.04.05	Kazuo Mori		Jidai-geki	
	逆襲の街	1961.04.05	Hajime Satō			
	銀座野郎	1961.04.05	Atsuto Wada			
	私は嘘を申しません	1961.04.05	Torajirō Saitō			
	悲しき60才	1961.04.05	Hisashi Terajima			
The Beautiful Bat	又四郎行状記 神変美女蝙蝠	1961.04.05	Toshikazu Kōno		Jidai-geki	
Kurama Hachi Tengu	鞍馬八天狗	1961.04.09	Daisuke Yamazaki		Jidai-geki	
	水溜り	1961.04.09	Kazuo Inoue			
	蒼い海流	1961.04.09	Manao Horiuchi			
Young Warrior on Mt. Fuji	富士に立つ若武者	1961.04.09	Tadashi Sawashima		Jidai-geki	
	風に逆らう流れ者	1961.04.09	Tokujirō Yamazaki			
Golden Peacock Castle Part II	新諸国物語 黄金孔雀城 第二部 第三部	1961.04.09	Shōji Matsumura		Jidai-geki	
Boss Fighting to the Death at Dawn	顔役暁に死す	1961.04.10	Kihachi Okamoto		Yakuza	
	胸の中の火	1961.04.10	Kenjirō Morinaga			
	胎動期 私たちは天使じゃない	1961.04.12	Akira Miwa			
	抵抗の年齢	1961.04.12	Michiharu Aoyama			
	アトミックのおぼん スリますわヨの巻	1961.04.16	Kōzō Saeki			
	女のつり橋	1961.04.16	Keigo Kimura			
Tobidashita Onna Daimyo	飛び出した女大名	1961.04.16	Kimiyoshi Yasuda		Jidai-geki	
	抱いて頂戴	1961.04.16	Kimio Iwaki			
	無鉄砲大将	1961.04.16	Seijun Suzuki			
	あの波の果てまで 前篇	1961.04.16	Mitsuo Yagi			
	明日に向って突っ走れ	1961.04.17	Takumi Furukawa			
Saikoro Bugyo	さいころ奉行	1961.04.18	Kōkichi Uchide		Jidai-geki	
	女舞	1961.04.18	Hideo Ōba			
Golden Peacock Castle Conclusion	新諸国物語 黄金孔雀城 完結篇	1961.04.18	Shōji Matsumura		Jidai-geki	
	若い明日を突っ走れ	1961.04.19	Atsuto Wada			
	南郷次郎探偵帳 影なき殺人者	1961.04.19	Yoshihiro Ishikawa			
	アマゾン無宿 世紀の大魔王	1961.04.21	Shigehiro Ozawa			
Kaijin Madarazukin	怪人まだら頭巾	1961.04.21	Noboru Ono		Jidai-geki	
	大当り百発百中	1961.04.23	Masahisa Sunohara			
	用心棒稼業	1961.04.23	Toshio Masuda			
Mask of the Moon	月形半平太	1961.04.25	Masahiro Makino		Jidai-geki	
	社長道中記	1961.04.25	Shūe Matsubayashi			
Little Tengu	緋ざくら小天狗	1961.04.25	Daisuke Yamazaki		Jidai-geki	
Yojimbo	用心棒	1961.04.25	Akira Kurosawa	Toshiro Mifune, Eijirō Tōno, Kamatari Fujiwara	Jidai-geki	
	お笑い三人組 泣き虫弱虫かんの虫	1961.04.26	Yoshiki Onoda			
Kenka Fuji	喧嘩富士	1961.04.26	Kunio Watanabe		Jidai-geki	
	五人の突撃隊	1961.04.26	Umetsugu Inoue			
	東京湾の突風野郎	1961.04.26	Kiyoshi Komori			
	旅はお色気	1961.04.26	Yoshiyuki Kuroda			
	恋とのれん	1961.04.28	Yoshiaki Banshō			
	大海原を行く渡り鳥	1961.04.29	Buichi Saitō			
Otemoyan	おてもやん	1961.05.03	Shigeru Doi		Jidai-geki	
	怪人まだら頭巾 紅ぐも地獄	1961.05.03	Noboru Ono			
	荒原の掠奪者	1961.05.03	Kyōji Shimomura			
Tange Sazen and the Princess	丹下左膳 濡れ燕一刀流	1961.05.03	Sadatsugu Matsuda		Jidai-geki	
	地獄に真紅な花が咲く	1961.05.03	Kiyoshi Saeki			
	底抜け三平 危険大歓迎	1961.05.03	Motoo Nishimura			
Kirimaru Kirigakure	霧丸霧がくれ	1961.05.03	Yasushi Sasaki		Jidai-geki	
	有難や節 あゝ有難や有難や	1961.05.03	Katsumi Nishikawa			
Ten Dark Women	黒い十人の女	1961.05.03	Kon Ichikawa	Keiko Kishi, Fujiko Yamamoto, Mariko Miyagi	Comedy-drama	
	青い芽の素顔	1961.05.08	Kiyoshi Horiike			
	金づくり無法時代	1961.05.09	Seiichirō Uchikawa			
	図々しい奴	1961.05.09	Chisato Ikoma			
	大阪野郎	1961.05.09	Tatsuo Ōsone			
Ucchari Himegimi	うっちゃり姫君	1961.05.10	Katsuhiko Tasaka		Jidai-geki	
	お笑い三人組 怪しい奴にご用心	1961.05.10	Yoshiki Onoda			
	お役者変化捕物帖 血どくろ屋敷	1961.05.10	Toshikazu Kōno		Jidai-geki	
	がめつい奴は損をする	1961.05.10	Eiichi Koishi			
	投資令嬢	1961.05.10	Hiromu Edagawa			
	ネオンの海の暴れん坊	1961.05.11	Atsuto Wada			
Ninja Messenger and the Three Daughters	忍術使いと三人娘	1961.05.11	Masahiko Izawa		Jidai-geki / Ninja	
Hakko Ryukitai	八荒流騎隊	1961.05.11	Eiichi Kudō		Jidai-geki	
	ろくでなし野郎	1961.05.13	Akinori Matsuo			
	東京ドドンパ娘	1961.05.13	Motomu Ida			
	男の血潮がこだまする	1961.05.14	Shōichi Shimazu			
	わが恋の旅路	1961.05.16	Masahiro Shinoda			
	女家族	1961.05.16	Seiji Hisamatsu			
Senryo Garasu	千両鴉	1961.05.16	Ryō Hagiwara		Jidai-geki	
	東京夜話	1961.05.16	Shirō Toyoda			
	36年大相撲夏場所 前半戦	1961.05.17	Torahiko Ise [composition]			
	べっぴんさんに気をつけろ	1961.05.17	Eiichi Koishi			
Hanagasa Futari Wakashu	花笠ふたり若衆	1961.05.17	Yasushi Sasaki		Jidai-geki	
Sakuradamon	桜田門	1961.05.17	Masateru Nishiyama		Jidai-geki	
	湯の街姉妹	1961.05.17	Tatsuo Yamada			
Bride of White Castle	白馬城の花嫁	1961.05.17	Tadashi Sawashima		Jidai-geki	
	風雲新撰組	1961.05.17	Masaki Mōri		Jidai-geki	
	腕まくり七色娘	1961.05.17	Shigeaki Hidaka			
Daibosatsu Pass 3: The Final Chapter	大菩薩峠 完結篇	1961.05.17	Kazuo Mori		Jidai-geki	
	三つの竜の刺青	1961.05.21	Hiroshi Noguchi			
	進藤の社長シリーズ 次郎長社長と石松社員	1961.05.21	Masaharu Segawa			
	飛ばせ特急便 深夜の脱獄者	1961.05.21	Masamitsu Igayama			
	北上夜曲	1961.05.21	Yoshitsugu Nakajima			
Obon's Dipping Contest	漫画横丁 アトミックのおぼん 女親分対決の巻	1961.05.23	Kozo Saeki	Yoshie Mizutani, Ichiro Arishima, Sonoarni Nakajima	Comedy	
	36年大相撲夏場所 後半戦	1961.05.24	Torahiko Ise [composition]			
Fire Line	火線地帯	1961.05.24	Hiromichi Takebe	Teruo Yoshida, Yôko Mihara, Shigeru Amachi, Jun Tazaki	Crime	
	東京おにぎり娘	1961.05.24	Shigeo Tanaka			
	北上夜曲 北上川の初恋	1961.05.24	Yoshio Inoue			
	かあちゃんしぐのいやだ	1961.05.26	Yoshirō Kawazu			
	花扉	1961.05.26	Tsuneo Tabata			
Miyamoto Musashi I: Zen and Sword	宮本武蔵	1961.05.27	Tomu Uchida		Jidai-geki	
	特ダネ三十時間 危険な恋人	1961.05.27	Eijirō Wakabayashi			
	闇に流れる口笛	1961.05.28	Yōichi Ushihara			
	機動捜査班 罠のある街	1961.05.28	Isamu Kosugi			
Kyuketsu Shibijinbori	吸血死美人彫り	1961.05.28	Hideaki Ōnishi		Jidai-geki	
	赤いネオンに霧が降る	1961.05.28	Satoru Ainoda			
Poignant Story	妻として女として	1961.05.30	Mikio Naruse	Hideko Takamine, Masayuki Mori, Chikage Awashima	Drama	
Playboy President-Part II	続社長道中記 女親分対決の巻	1961.05.30	Shue Matsubayashi	Hisaya Morishige, Keiju Kobayashi, Reiko Dan	Comedy	
	魚河岸の女石松	1961.05.31	Eiichi Kudō			
	新人生劇場	1961.05.31	Tarō Yuge			
Bishonen Henge	美少年変化	1961.05.31	Kimiyoshi Yasuda		Jidai-geki	
	北上川悲歌	1961.05.31	Morihei Magatani			
	この若さある限り	1961.06.04	Koreyoshi Kurahara			
	吸血怪人屋敷	1961.06.04	Hideaki Ōnishi			
	散弾銃の男	1961.06.04	Seijun Suzuki			
Traveling Street	ちゃりんこ街道	1961.06.06	Kōkichi Uchide		Jidai-geki	
Long-Sleeved Noble's Page Detective Story: The Snake Princess' Orchestra	ふり袖小姓捕物帖 蛇姫囃子	1961.06.06	Kinnosuke Fukada		Jidai-geki	
Dodonpa Suikoden	ドドンパ酔虎伝	1961.06.07	Tokuzō Tanaka		Jidai-geki	
Sebiro Sugata no Wataridori	背広姿の渡り鳥	1961.06.07	Kunihiro Sunami			
	わが生涯は火の如く	1961.06.09	Hideo Sekikawa			
	引越やつれ	1961.06.09	Manao Horiuchi			
	女の橋	1961.06.09	Noboru Nakamura			
	風来坊探偵 赤い谷の惨劇	1961.06.09	Kinji Fukasaku		Yakuza	
Aoi no Abarenbo	葵の暴れん坊	1961.06.11	Daisuke Yamazaki		Jidai-geki	
Young Lord Yakuza	橋蔵の若様やくざ	1961.06.11	Toshikazu Kōno		Jidai-geki	
	助っ人稼業	1961.06.11	Buichi Saitō			
	お父ちゃんは大学生	1961.06.12	Ren Yoshimura			
The Gambler's Code	沓掛時次郎	1961.06.14	Kazuo Ikehiro		Jidai-geki	
	夜はいじわる	1961.06.14	Shigeo Tanaka			
Spear of Heroism	豪快千両槍	1961.06.17	Junji Kurata		Jidai-geki	
	飛ばせ特急便 魔の十八号線	1961.06.17	Masamitsu Igayama			
Challenge to Live	愛と炎と	1961.06.17	Eizo Sugawa	Tatsuya Mihashi, Yoko Tsukasa		
Death on the Mountain	黒い画集 ある遭難	1961.06.17	Toshio Sugie	Takashi Wada, Kiyoshi Kodama, Kyōko Kagawa		
	都会の空の非常線	1961.06.18	Takashi Nomura			
	舞妓の上京	1961.06.19	Kenjirō Morinaga			
Hayabusa Daimyo	はやぶさ大名	1961.06.21	Shigehiro Ozawa		Jidai-geki	
Days of Young Jirocho: Young Boss Alone in Tokai	若き日の次郎長 東海一の若親分	1961.06.21	Masahiro Makino		Jidai-geki	
	特ダネ三十時間 東京租界の女	1961.06.21	Eijirō Wakabayashi			
Bishonen Henge: Tatsu no Misaki No Ketto	美少年変化 竜の岬の決闘	1961.06.21	Katsuhiko Tasaka		Jidai-geki	
	恋の画集	1961.06.21	Yoshitarō Nomura			
Who Are You, Mr. Sorge?	スパイ・ゾルゲ 真珠湾前夜	1961.06.21	Yves Ciampi	Thomas Holtzmann, Mario Adorf, Akira Yamauchi, Keiko Kishi	Drama	France-Japan co-production
For the Flower, the Storm, and the Gang	花と嵐とギャング	1961.06.23	Teruo Ishii		Yakuza	
	風来坊探偵 岬を渡る黒い風	1961.06.23	Kinji Fukasaku			
	俺は死なないぜ	1961.06.25	Eisuke Takizawa			
Saraiiman Yaji Kita Dochu	サラリーマン 弥次喜多道中	1961.06.27	Nobuo Aoyagi	Tadao Takashima, Yumi Shirakawa, Yu Fujiki	Comedy	
Kill the Killer	断崖の決闘	1961.06.27	Kozo Saeki	Yosuke Natsuki, Kumi Mizuno, Tatsuya Mihashi		
	機動捜査班 秘密会員章	1961.06.28	Isamu Kosugi			
	女の勲章	1961.06.28	Kōzaburō Yoshimura			
	新夫婦読本 窓から見ないで	1961.06.28	Sōkichi Tomimoto			
	秀才はんと鈍才どん	1961.06.30	Kunio Matoi			
	あの波の果てまで 後篇	1961.06.30	Mitsuo Yagi			
	いのちの朝	1961.07.01	Yutaka Abe			
	海の勝負師	1961.07.01	Koreyoshi Kurahara			
	幽霊五十三次	1961.07.01	Masahiko Izawa		Jidai-geki	
A Night in Hongkong	香港の夜 A NIGHT IN HONGKONG	1961.07.01	Yasuki Chiba	Akira Takarada, Yu Ming, Yoko Tsukasa	Romantic melodrama	Japanese-Hong Kong co-production
Long-Sleeved Noble's Page Detective Story: Bloody Monji's Skin	ふり袖小姓捕物帖 血文字肌	1961.07.02	Kinnosuke Fukada		Jidai-geki	
Ghost of Oiwa	怪談お岩の亡霊	1961.07.02	Tai Katō		Jidai-geki	
Ninja Messenger and the Three Daughters: Female Fox Goblin	忍術使いと三人娘 女狐変化	1961.07.02	Masahiko Izawa		Jidai-geki / Ninja	
Ghost Story of Kakui Street	怪談蚊喰鳥	1961.07.05	Kazuo Mori		Jidai-geki	
	台風息子 お化け退治	1961.07.05	Toshirō Suzuki			
	金も命もいらないぜ	1961.07.08	Tsuneo Kobayashi			
	進藤の社長シリーズ 続次郎長社長と石松社員	1961.07.08	Kunio Watanabe			
Sir Galahad in Campus	大学の若大将	1961.07.08	Toshio Sugie	Yūzō Kayama, Yuriko Hoshi, Reiko Dan	Musical comedy	
	雲がちぎれる時	1961.07.09	Heinosuke Gosho			
	七人の挑戦者	1961.07.09	Akinori Matsuo			
	青い狩人	1961.07.09	Motomu Ida			
	母と娘	1961.07.09	Yoshirō Kawazu			
Kirimaru Kirigakure: The Wolf of the Southern Sea	霧丸霧がくれ 南海の狼	1961.07.09	Shōji Matsumura		Jidai-geki	
Shingo's Challenge Part II	新吾二十番勝負 第二部	1961.07.09	Sadatsugu Matsuda		Jidai-geki	
	舞妓の休日	1961.07.12	Masateru Nishiyama			
Mito Komon Crosses the Sea	水戸黄門海を渡る	1961.07.12	Kunio Watanabe	Kazuo Hasegawa, Shintarō Katsu, Raizō Ichikawa	Jidai-geki	
	荒原牧場の決闘	1961.07.15	Shōichi Shimazu			
	太陽、海を染めるとき	1961.07.15	Toshio Masuda			
	大人と子供のあいの子だい	1961.07.15	Mitsuo Wakasugi			
	36年大相撲名古屋場所	1961.07.17	Torahiko Ise [composition]			
Isobushi Genta	磯しぶき源太	1961.07.19	Kimiyoshi Yasuda		Jidai-geki	
Lord Mito: Struggles of Suke and Kaku	水戸黄門 助さん格さん大暴れ	1961.07.19	Tadashi Sawashima		Jidai-geki	
	泥だらけの拳銃	1961.07.19	Keigo Kimura			
The Orphan Brother	安寿と厨子王丸	1961.07.19	Taiji Yabushita, Yūgo Serikawa		Anime	
Invasion of the Neptune Men	宇宙快速船	1961.07.19	Koji Ota	Sonny Chiba, Kappei Matsumoto, Mitsue Komiya	Science fiction / Superhero	
	カメラ・トップ屋 お嬢さんが狙ってる	1961.07.23	Eiichi Koishi			
Hiroshi Moriya's Sandogasa Series: Nakito Gozansu	守屋浩の三度笠シリーズ 泣きとうござんす	1961.07.23	Jun Fukuda		Jidai-geki	
	闘いつゞける男	1961.07.23	Katsumi Nishikawa			
	皮ジャン・ブルース	1961.07.23	Masuichi Iizuka			
	恋をするより得をしろ	1961.07.23	Masahisa Sunohara			
Zoku Sarariiman Yaji Kita Dochu	続サラリーマン 弥次喜多道中	1961.07.23	Nobuo Aoyagi	Tadao Takashima, Yumi Shirakawa, Yu Fujiki		
	サラリーマン手帳 夢を失わず	1961.07.26	Masao Saitō			
	河口	1961.07.26	Noboru Nakamura			
Strike of the Jaguma	怪獣蛇九魔の猛襲	1961.07.26	Kiyoharu Akimoto		Jidai-geki / Ninja	
	女は二度生れる	1961.07.28	Yūzō Kawashima			
	性生活の知恵	1961.07.28	Rei Mizuno			
	カメラ・トップ屋 お色気無手勝流	1961.07.30	Eiichi Koishi			
	赤い荒野	1961.07.30	Hiroshi Noguchi			
	天に代りて不義を討つ	1961.07.30	Ren Yoshimura			
Outlaw Tiger	無法者の虎	1961.07.30	Kinnosuke Fukada		Jidai-geki	
Awamori-kun uridasu	アワモリ君売出す	1961.07.30	Kengo Furusawa	Kyu Sakamoto, Kayoko Moriyama, Jerry Fujio	Comedy	
Mothra	モスラ	1961.07.30	Ishirō Honda	Frankie Sakai, Hiroshi Koizumi, Kyōko Kagawa	Kaiju	
Case of Umon: Woman of the Magic Lantern	右門捕物帖 まぼろし燈籠の女	1961.08.01	Eiichi Kudō		Jidai-geki	
Bored Hatamoto: Riddle of the Seven Colors Palace	旗本退屈男 謎の七色御殿	1961.08.01	Yasushi Sasaki		Jidai-geki	
Counterattack in Amanohashidate	逆襲天の橋立	1961.08.01	Kiyoharu Akimoto		Jidai-geki	
Sashichi Detective Story: Terror of the Phantom Killer	人形佐七捕物帖 恐怖の通り魔	1961.08.02	Junji Kurata		Jidai-geki	
	ひばり民謡の旅 べらんめえ芸者佐渡へ行く	1961.08.05	Kunio Watanabe			
	ファンキーハットの快男児	1961.08.05	Kinji Fukasaku			
	ひとり寝	1961.08.06	Tatsuo Sakai			
	ヨットとお転婆娘	1961.08.06	Kiyoshi Horiike			
	拳銃横丁	1961.08.06	Tokujirō Yamazaki			
	背徳のメス	1961.08.06	Yoshitarō Nomura			
Moriya Hiroshi no sandogasa shiriizu - Arigataya sandogasa	守屋浩の三度笠シリーズ 有難や三度笠	1961.08.06	Jun Fukuda	Hiroshi Moriya, Mie Hama, Makoto Satō	Jidai-geki	
	お馬は七十七万石	1961.08.08	Katsuhiko Tasaka			
	夕やけ小やけの赤とんぼ	1961.08.08	Kōji Shima			
Sashichi Detective Story: The Iron Caustic That Laughs in the Night	人形佐七捕物帖 闇に笑う鉄火面	1961.08.09	Junji Kurata		Jidai-geki	
	ヒマラヤ無宿 心臓破りの野郎ども	1961.08.13	Shigehiro Ozawa			
	モーガン警部と謎の男	1961.08.13	Hideo Sekikawa			
	機動捜査班 都会の牙	1961.08.13	Isamu Kosugi			
	好人好日	1961.08.13	Minoru Shibuya			
	高原児	1961.08.13	Buichi Saitō			
	女房学校	1961.08.13	Umetsugu Inoue			
Samurai's Daughter	小太刀を使う女	1961.08.13	Kazuo Ikehiro		Jidai-geki	
	台風息子 冒険旅行の巻	1961.08.13	Toshirō Suzuki			
	白い南風	1961.08.13	Chisato Ikoma			
Law in Ghost Land	幽霊島の掟	1961.08.13	Yasushi Sasaki		Jidai-geki	
Urban Affairs	喜劇 駅前団地	1961.08.13	Seiji Hisamatsu	Hisaya Morishige, Frankie Sakai, Junzaburo Ban	Comedy	
Blood on the Sea	紅の海	1961.08.13	Senkichi Taniguchi	Yūzō Kayama, Yosuke Natsuki, Makoto Satō	Adventure	
	太陽は狂ってる	1961.08.16	Toshio Masuda			
	銀座ジャングル娘	1961.08.20	Masahisa Sunohara			
	情無用の喧嘩状	1961.08.23	Kōkichi Uchide			
	世界オートバイレース 王座を賭けて	1961.08.26	Akira Shiraishi			
Edo Prosperity	江戸っ子繁昌記	1961.08.26	Masahiro Makino		Jidai-geki	
	静かなるならず者	1961.08.26	Masuichi Iizuka			
	霧と影	1961.08.26	Teruo Ishii			
Seven Knights Part I	新黄金孔雀城 七人の騎士 第一部 第二部	1961.08.26	Kōsaku Yamashita		Jidai-geki	
	兇悪の波止場	1961.08.27	Takumi Furukawa			
Ginpei of Koina	鯉名の銀平	1961.08.27	Tokuzō Tanaka		Jidai-geki	
	雑婚時代	1961.08.27	Shigeo Tanaka			
	峠を渡る若い風	1961.08.27	Seijun Suzuki			
	熱愛者	1961.08.29	Kazuo Inoue			
	風来先生	1961.08.29	Hirokazu Ichimura			
Toiretto bucho	トイレット部長	1961.08.29	Masanori Kakei	Ryō Ikebe, Keiko Awaji, Mitsuko Mori		
Kawachi fudoki-Zoku oiroke seppo	河内風土記 続おいろけ説法	1961.08.29	Kozo Saeki	Hisaya Morishige, Chisako Hara, Tadao Takashima	Comedy	
	セールスマン物語 男にゃ男の夢がある	1961.09.02	Motomu Ida			
	ノサップの銃	1961.09.02	Akinori Matsuo			
Girl of Dark	女ばかりの夜	1961.09.05	Kinuyo Tanaka	Chisako Hara, Akemi Kita, Chikage Awashima		
Kimagure Garasu	気まぐれ鴉	1961.09.06	Noboru Ono		Jidai-geki	
	故郷は緑なりき	1961.09.06	Shinji Murayama			
Shusse Bushido	出世武士道	1961.09.06	Toshikazu Kōno		Jidai-geki	
	東京パトロール 粋な二人のお巡りさん	1961.09.06	Kiyoshi Saeki			
	命みじかし恋せよ乙女	1961.09.06	Hisashi Terajima			
Seven Knights Conclusion	新黄金孔雀城 七人の騎士 完結篇	1961.09.06	Kōsaku Yamashita		Jidai-geki	
	寛美の三等社員	1961.09.09	Kinya Sakai			
	伴淳・森繁のおったまげ村物語	1961.09.09	Manao Horiuchi			
	あいつと私	1961.09.10	Kō Nakahira			
	可愛いめんどりが歌った	1961.09.10	Sōkichi Tomimoto			
	追跡	1961.09.10	Katsumi Nishikawa			
	幼馴染というだけさ	1961.09.10	Tarō Yuge			
Shinnyushain juban shobu	新入社員十番勝負	1961.09.12	Eiji Iwaki	Jun Funato, Kumi Mizuno, Keiko Yanagawa	Kendo drama	
A Man in Red	真紅の男	1961.09.12	Ishirō Honda	Makoto Satō, Yumi Shirakawa, Akira Kubo	Yakuza	
	いかすじゃねえか三度笠	1961.09.13	Kinnosuke Fukada			
	ファンキーハットの快男児 2千万円の腕	1961.09.13	Kinji Fukasaku			
Lady Yakuza, Flower of Edo	花のお江戸のやくざ姫	1961.09.13	Eiichi Kudō		Jidai-geki	
	警視庁物語 十二人の刑事	1961.09.13	Shinji Murayama			
Happyakuman Goku ni Idomu Otoko	八百万石に挑む男	1961.09.13	Nobuo Nakagawa		Jidai-geki	
Suttobi Jingi	すっとび仁義	1961.09.15	Kimiyoshi Yasuda		Jidai-geki	
	銀座のぼんぼん	1961.09.15	Shunkai Mizuho			
	ふりむいた花嫁	1961.09.16	Yoshiaki Banshō			
Immortal Love	永遠の人	1961.09.16	Keisuke Kinoshita	Hideko Takamine, Yoshi Katō, Keiji Sada	Romance	
Achan no bebii gyangu	アッちゃんのベビーギャング	1961.09.17	Toshio Sugie	Keiju Kobayashi, Keiko Awaji, Mie Hama		
The Youth and His Amulet	ゲンと不動明王	1961.09.17	Hiroshi Inagaki	Toru Koyanagi, Hisako Sakabe, Toshiro Mifune	Fantasy drama	
	白い雲と少女	1961.09.20	Kenjirō Morinaga			
	黄色い風土	1961.09.23	Teruo Ishii			
	機動捜査班 東京危険地帯	1961.09.23	Isamu Kosugi			
Whistling Drifter	口笛を吹く無宿者	1961.09.23	Daisuke Yamazaki		Jidai-geki	
Case of Young Lord 9: Black Camellia	若さま侍捕物帳 黒い椿	1961.09.23	Tadashi Sawashima		Jidai-geki	
	進藤の社長シリーズ 次郎長社長とよさこい道中	1961.09.23	Masaharu Segawa			
	大森林に向って立つ	1961.09.23	Takashi Nomura			
	36年大相撲秋場所 前半戦	1961.09.25	Torahiko Ise [composition]			
Procurers of Hell	地獄の饗宴	1961.09.29	Kihachi Okamoto	Tatsuya Mihashi, Reiko Dan, Jun Tazaki		
Snow in the South Seas	南の島に雪が降る	1961.09.29	Seiji Hisamatsu	Daisuke Katō, Hisaya Morishige, Junzaburo Ban		
	性生活の知恵 第2部	1961.09.30	Tsuyoshi Abe			
Tough Guy	悪名	1961.09.30	Tokuzo Tanaka	Shintaro Katsu, Jiro Tamiya, Tamao Nakamura	Yakuza	
	めぐり逢う日まで 純白の巻	1961.10.01	Tsuneo Tabata			
	俺は地獄へ行く	1961.10.01	Hiroshi Noguchi			
	海峡、血に染めて	1961.10.01	Seijun Suzuki			
	禁猟区	1961.10.01	Seiichirō Uchikawa			
	36年大相撲秋場所 後半戦	1961.10.02	Torahiko Ise [composition]			
	明日が私に微笑みかける	1961.10.04	Ryōichi Yamanouchi			
Yotsugi Hatsu Dochu	お世継ぎ初道中	1961.10.07	Kōkichi Uchide		Jidai-geki	
	風の野郎と二人づれ	1961.10.07	Masamitsu Igayama			
	万年太郎と姉御社員	1961.10.07	Tsuneo Kobayashi			
Tabi-Garasu Hanayome Shobu	旅がらす花嫁勝負	1961.10.07	Noboru Ono		Jidai-geki	
	アワモリ君乾杯！	1961.10.08	Kengo Furusawa			
The Last War	世界大戦争	1961.10.08	Shue Matsubayashi	Frankie Sakai, Nobuko Otowa, Akira Takarada	Drama, science fiction	
	ママおうちが燃えてるの	1961.10.11	Yoshirō Kawazu			
	三味線とオートバイ	1961.10.11	Masahiro Shinoda			
	色の道教えます 夢三夜	1961.10.11	Bin Kato			
Mahiru no Yukai	真昼の誘拐	1961.10.11	Mitsuo Wakasugi		Yakuza	
Okoto To Sasuke	お琴と佐助	1961.10.14	Teinosuke Kinugasa		Jidai-geki	
Silent Stranger of the Underworld	暗黒街の静かな男	1961.10.14	Toshio Masuda		Yakuza	
Ishin no Kagaribi	維新の篝火	1961.10.14	Sadatsugu Matsuda		Jidai-geki	
	街	1961.10.14	Miyoji Ieki			
Minato-Matsuri ni Kita Otoko	港祭りに来た男	1961.10.14	Masahiro Makino		Jidai-geki	
Shin Genji Monogatari	新源氏物語	1961.10.14	Kazuo Mori		Jidai-geki	
	波止場気質	1961.10.14	Tokujirō Yamazaki			
	東京パトロール 終列車の少年	1961.10.17	Kiyoshi Saeki			
	べらんめえ中乗りさん	1961.10.22	Masamitsu Igayama			
	素飛び二人三脚	1961.10.22	Masahiko Izawa			
	堂堂たる人生	1961.10.22	Yōichi Ushihara			
Yagyu Chronicles 3: The Valley of Outlaws	柳生一番勝負 無頼の谷	1961.10.22	Shōji Matsumura		Jidai-geki / Ninja	
	いれずみ乳房	1961.10.25	Katsuhiko Tasaka			
	サラリーマン手帳 坊ちゃん社員とぼんぼん社員	1961.10.25	Kinya Sakai			
	喜劇 金の実る樹に恋が咲く	1961.10.25	Seiichi Fukuda			
	草を刈る娘	1961.10.25	Katsumi Nishikawa			
	復讐は俺らの歌	1961.10.25	Eiichi Koishi			
	B・G物語 二十才の設計	1961.10.29	Seiji Maruyama			
	献身	1961.10.29	Shigeo Tanaka			
A Wife Confesses	妻は告白する	1961.10.29	Yasuzo Masumura	Ayako Wakao, Hiroshi Kawaguchi, Eitaro Ozawa	Drama	
The End of Summer	小早川家の秋	1961.10.29	Yasujirō Ozu	Setsuko Hara, Chishū Ryū, Kuniko Miyake	Drama	
	ママ恋人がほしいの	1961.11.01	Kiyoshi Horiike			
	狂熱の果て	1961.11.01	Eizō Yamagiwa			
	妻あり子あり友ありて	1961.11.01	Umetsugu Inoue			
	若君と次男坊	1961.11.01	Shigehiro Ozawa		Jidai-geki	
	進藤の社長シリーズ 石松社員は男でござる	1961.11.01	Masuichi Iizuka			
	白昼の無頼漢	1961.11.01	Kinji Fukasaku			
	嵐を突っ切るジェット機	1961.11.01	Koreyoshi Kurahara			
	あの波の果てまで 完結篇	1961.11.01	Mitsuo Yagi			
Buddha	釈迦	1961.11.01	Kenji Misumi	Kojiro Hongo, Charito Solis, Shintaro Katsu	Historical drama	Japan-Philippines co-production
	都会の魔窟	1961.11.08	Yoshitsugu Nakajima			
The Conspirator	反逆児	1961.11.08	Daisuke Itō		Jidai-geki	
	街に気球があがる時	1961.11.12	Motomu Ida			
	紅の銃帯	1961.11.12	Isamu Kosugi			
Kuroi Sandogasa	黒い三度笠	1961.11.12	Masateru Nishiyama		Jidai-geki	
	男の銘柄	1961.11.12	Tarō Yuge			
	二人の息子	1961.11.12	Yasuki Chiba			
	黒い画集 第二話 寒流	1961.11.12	Hideo Suzuki			
	悪魔の手毬唄	1961.11.15	Kunio Watanabe			
	学生重役	1961.11.15	Manao Horiuchi			
Kubinashi Jima no Hanayome	首なし島の花嫁	1961.11.15	Hideaki Ōnishi		Jidai-geki	
Ephemeral Samurai	かげろう侍	1961.11.19	Kazuo Ikehiro		Jidai-geki	
	母あちゃん海が知ってるよ	1961.11.19	Buichi Saitō			
	明日を呼ぶ港	1961.11.19	Kōji Shima			
	カミナリお転婆娘	1961.11.22	Masahisa Sunohara			
	どじょっこの歌	1961.11.22	Eisuke Takizawa			
	はだかっ子	1961.11.22	Tomotaka Tasaka			
	愛情の系譜	1961.11.22	Heinosuke Gosho			
	京化粧	1961.11.22	Hideo Ōba			
	銀座の旅笠	1961.11.22	Masamitsu Igayama			
	湖畔の人	1961.11.22	Kiyoshi Saeki			
	黒い傷あとのブルース	1961.11.22	Yoshiki Onoda			
	飼育	1961.11.22	Nagisa Ōshima			
	猫と鰹節 ある詐話師の物語	1961.11.22	Hiromichi Horikawa			
Bandits on the Wind	野盗風の中を走る	1961.11.22	Hiroshi Inagaki		Jidai-geki	
	椀	1961.11.22				
	野獣の門	1961.11.26	Takumi Furukawa			
	七人のあらくれ	1961.11.29	Hiromu Edagawa			
Heiji Zenigata Detective Story: Beautiful Shark	銭形平次捕物控 美人鮫	1961.11.29	Kenji Misumi		Jidai-geki	
	蝙蝠屋敷	1961.11.29	Mitsuo Kōzu			
	百万弗を叩き出せ	1961.12.01	Seijun Suzuki			
	36年大相撲九州場所 新横綱柏鵬の対決	1961.12.06	Torahiko Ise [composition]			
	乾杯！ごきげん野郎	1961.12.06	Masaharu Segawa			
Gonkuro's Travel Journal	権九郎旅日記	1961.12.06	Eiichi Kudō		Jidai-geki	
	早討ち無頼 大平原の男	1961.12.06	Hiroshi Noguchi			
	ご機嫌はりきり娘	1961.12.07	Masao Saitō			
	めぐり逢う日まで 真紅の巻	1961.12.07	Tsuneo Tabata			
	お兄哥さんとお姐さん	1961.12.08	Yoshiyuki Kuroda		Jidai-geki	
	強くなる男	1961.12.08	Mitsuo Murayama			
	ベビーギャングとお姐ちゃん	1961.12.09	Toshio Sugie			
	花影	1961.12.09	Yūzō Kawashima			
	黒い傷あとのブルース	1961.12.10	Takashi Nomura			
	一本杉はなにを見た	1961.12.13	Ren Yoshimura			
Hibari is Fashion Crazy	ひばりのおしゃれ狂女	1961.12.15	Yasushi Sasaki		Jidai-geki	
	小さな花の物語	1961.12.15	Yoshirō Kawazu			
	二階の他人	1961.12.15	Yōji Yamada			
	八人目の敵	1961.12.15	Hajime Satō			
	うるさい妹たち	1961.12.17	Yasuzō Masumura			
	ガンバー課長	1961.12.17	Nobuo Aoyagi			
Witness Killed	暗黒街撃滅命令	1961.12.17	Jun Fukuda	Tatsuya Mihashi, Makoto Satō, Yuriko Hoshi	Yakuza / Thriller	
Tough Guy, Part 2	続悪名	1961.12.17	Tokuzo Tanaka	Shintaro Katsu, Jiro Tamiya, Tamao Nakamura	Yakuza	
	機動捜査班 暴力	1961.12.20	Isamu Kosugi			
	アラブの嵐	1961.12.24	Kō Nakahira			
	アワモリ君西へ行く	1961.12.24	Kengo Furusawa			
	ずらり俺たちゃ用心棒	1961.12.24	Akinori Matsuo			
	のれんと花嫁	1961.12.24	Yoshiaki Banshō			
	喜劇 駅前弁当	1961.12.24	Seiji Hisamatsu			
The Red Shadow	赤い影法師	1961.12.24	Shigehiro Ozawa		Jidai-geki / Ninja	
	大当り三代記	1961.12.24	Kunio Matoi			
	地獄の底をぶち破れ	1961.12.24	Yasushi Sasaki			
Flower Brothers	花の兄弟	1961.12.27	Kazuo Ikehiro		Jidai-geki	
	若い奴らの階段	1961.12.27	Shigeo Tanaka			

== See also ==
- 1961 in Japan
