= List of Italian films of 1961 =

A list of films produced in Italy in 1961 (see 1961 in film):

Italian films released in 1961
Title	Director	Cast	Genre	Notes
A cavallo della tigre	Luigi Comencini	Nino Manfredi, Gian Maria Volonté, Serge Reggiani	Comedy	
A due passi dal confine	Gianni Vernuccio	Ombretta Colli, Tony Bellani	Drama	
A porte chiuse	Dino Risi	Anita Ekberg, Claudio Gora	Comedy	
Accattone	Pier Paolo Pasolini	Franco Citti, Franca Pasut, Silvana Corsini	Drama	
Adelchi	Vittorio Gasmann, Carla Ragionieri	Vittorio Gassmann, Valentina Fortunato, Carlo D'Angelo	History	TV-footage of the theatrical performance
Akiko	Luigi Filippo D'Amico	Paolo Panelli, Marcello Paolini	Comedy	
Alfa Omega	Bruno Bozzetto		Animation	
America di notte	Giuseppe Maria Scotese	Angela Maria, Lionel Hampton	documentary	
Famous love affairs (Amours célèbres)	Michel Boisrond	Alain Delon, Brigitte Bardot, Jean-Paul Belmondo, Philippe Noiret	Historic	French-Italian coproduction
The Assassin	Elio Petri	Marcello Mastroianni		Entered into the 11th Berlin International Film Festival
Atlas in the Land of the Cyclops	Antonio Leonviola	Gordon Mitchell, Chelo Alonso, Vira Silenti	—N/a	
Attenzione: guerra!	Jiří Brdečka	Alberto Caldana		
Avventura dell'uomo				
Banditi a Orgosolo	Vittorio De Seta	Vittorina Pisano		Venice Award for debut feature
Battaglie sui mari	Roberto Savarese			
Battle of the Worlds	Antonio Margheriti	Claude Rains, Bill Carter, Umberto Orsini	Science Fiction	
Bellezze sulla spiaggia	Romolo Girolami	Walter Chiari, Mario Carotenuto, Valeria Fabrizi	Commedia all'italiana	
The Best of Enemies	Guy Hamilton, Alessandro Blasetti	Alberto Sordi, David Niven, Amedeo Nazzari	—N/a	
Caccia all'uomo				
Cacciatori di dote				
Capitaine tempête				
Capitani di ventura				
Che femmina... e che dollari!				
Cinque leoni un soldo				
Civiltà romana				
Cocagne				
Controfagotto				
Cronache del '22				
Di là dalla gloria				
Diana				
Dichiarazione d'amore				
Divorce Italian Style	Pietro Germi	Marcello Mastroianni, Daniela Rocca, Stefania Sandrelli	Comedy	
Don Camillo monsignore ma non troppo				
Donne brutte				
Drakut il vendicatore				
Dynamite Jack				
El Cid				
Erik the Conqueror	Mario Bava	Giorgio Ardisson, Cameron Mitchell, Andrea Checchi	Peplum	
Esploratori a cavallo				
Fantasmi a Roma				
The Fascist (Il federale)	Luciano Salce	Ugo Tognazzi, Georges Wilson, Stefania Sandrelli, Mireille Granelli	Commedia all'italiana	About World War II
Fertilizzanti complessi				
Five Golden Hours				
Fra' Manisco cerca guai				
Freddy und der Millionär				
Gerarchi si muore				
Giorno per giorno disperatamente				
Gioventù di notte				
Gli addii				
Gli amici dell'isola				
Gli attendenti				
Gli incensurati				
Gli scontenti				
Gli stregoni				
Goliath Against the Giants	Guido Maletesta	Brad Harris, Gloria Milland, Fernando Rey	Peplum	
Goliath and the Vampires	Sergio Corbucci, Giacomo Gentilomo	Gordon Scott, Leonora Ruffo, Jacques Sernas	Peplum	
Gordon, il pirata nero				
Guns of the Black Witch	Domenico Paolella	Don Megowan, Silvana Pampanini, Emma Danieli		
Hercules and the Conquest of Atlantis	Vittorio Cottafavi	Reg Park, Fay Spain, Ettore Manni	—N/a	Italian-French co-production
Hercules in the Haunted World	Mario Bava	Reg Park, Christopher Lee	Peplum	
Hercules in the Valley of Woe	Mario Mattoli	Kirk Morris, Franco and Ciccio	—N/a	
Hindu Kush				
I 10 del Texas				
I due marescialli				
I giganti del cielo				
I magnifici tre				
I masnadieri				
I mongoli				
I sogni muoiono all'alba				
I soliti rapinatori a Milano				
I tartari				
Il bar di Gigi				
Il brigante				
Il cane di pietra				
Il colosso di Rodi				
Il conquistatore di Maracaibo				
Il fiume di Roma				
Il gigante di Metropolis				
Il ladro di Bagdad				
Il mantenuto				
Il mondo di notte numero 2				
Il più forte				
Il posto	Ermanno Olmi	Loredana Detto, Tullio Kezich, Sandro Panseri	Drama	Venice Award. Close to Italian neorealism
Il ratto delle sabine				
Il re di Poggioreale				
Il relitto				
Il segreto dello sparviero nero				
Il sicario				
Inchiesta a Perdasdefogu				
Io bacio... tu baci				
Italia '61				
Journey Beneath the Desert	Edgar G. Ulmer	Jean-Louis Trintignant, Haya Harareet	Adventure	French/Italian co-production
Che gioia vivere	René Clément	Alain Delon, Barbara Lass, Gino Cervi	Comedy	
Kanjut sar				
L'adorabile Giulio				
L'amant de cinq jours				
L'ammutinamento				
L'année dernière à Marienbad				
The Ladykiller of Rome (L'assassino)	Elio Petri	Marcello Mastroianni, Salvo Randone	Kafkaesque Drama	Petri's debut
L'imprevisto				
L'onorata società				
L'oro di Roma				
L'ultimo dei Vikinghi				
L'uomo in grigio				
L'urlo dei bolidi				
La colpa e la pena				
La corona di fuoco				
La facciola				
La Fayette				
La fille aux yeux d'or				
La giornata balorda				
La grande olimpiade				
La grande vallata				
La guerra di Troia			Peplum	
La moglie di mio marito				
La notte	Michelangelo Antonioni	Marcello Mastroianni, Jeanne Moreau, Monica Vitti, Bernhard Wicki	Drama	Won the Golden Bear at Berlin
La padrona di raggio di luna				
La Princesse de Clèves				
Girl with a Suitcase (La ragazza con la valiglia)	Valerio Zurlini	Claudia Cardinale, Jacques Perrin	Drama	
La ragazza di mille mesi				
La ragazza in vetrina				
La ragazza sotto il lenzuolo				
La tragica notte di Assisi				
La trincea				
The Vengeance of Ursus	Luigi Capuano	Samson Burke, Wandisa Guida, Livio Lorenzon	—N/a	
The Last Judgement (Il Giudizio universale)	Vittorio De Sica	Anouk Aimée, Vittorio Gassman, Nino Manfredi, Lino Ventura, Alberto Sordi, Fernandel, Silvana Mangano, Melina Mercouri, Jack Palance	Commedia all'italiana	Negatively reviewed by contemporary critics
Laura nuda				
Le avventure di topo Gigio				
Le baccanti				
Le capitaine Fracasse				
Le cave se rebiffe				
Le comte de Monte Cristo				
Le goût de la violence				
Le grand barrage				
Le italiane e l'amore				
Le magnifiche sette				
Le meraviglie di Aladino				
Le miracle des loups				
Le pavé de Paris				
Le président				
Le puits aux trois vérités				
Le sette sfide				
Le stagioni				
Le vergini di Roma				
Legge di guerra				
Leon Garros ishchet druga				
Leoni al sole				
Léon Morin, prêtre				
Les filles sèment le vent				
Les godelureaux				
Les grandes personnes				
Les hommes veulent vivre				
Les lions sont lâchés				
Les trois mousquetaires: La vengeance de Milady				
Les trois mousquetaires: Première époque – Les ferrets de la reine				
Lettera dal Venezuela				
Lola				
The Lovemakers (La viaccia)	Mauro Bolognini	Claudia Cardinale, Jean Paul Belmondo, Pietro Germi, Romolo Valli	Drama	
Lui, lei e il nonno				
Maciste alla corte del Gran Khan	Riccardo Freda	Gordon Scott, Yoko Tani	Peplum	
Maciste, l'uomo più forte del mondo			Peplum	
Madame (Madame Sans-Gêne)	Christian-Jaque	Sophia Loren, Robert Hossein		Historical
Malesia magica				
Mani in alto				
Mariti a congresso				
Mariti in pericolo				
Maurizio, Peppino e le indossatrici				
Milano nera				
Mina... fuori la guardia				
Morte di un bandito				
Napoléon II, l'aiglon				
Nefertiti, regina del Nilo				
No, No, It's a Sin				
Odissea nuda				
Orazi e curiazi				
Pastasciutta nel deserto				
Pecado de amor				
Pesci d'oro e bikini d'argento				
Pomodoro				
Processo Karamazov				
Psycosissimo				
Pugni, pupe e marinai				
Pulcinella, cetrulo di Acerra				
Pulcinella: Il gioco dell'oca				
Queen of the Seas	Umberto Lenzi	Lisa Gastoni, Jerome Courtland, Walter Barnes	—N/a	
Racconti dell'Italia di ieri – L' alfiere nero				
Racconti dell'Italia di ieri – Terno secco				
Racconti dell'Italia di ieri – Un episodio dell'anno della fame				
Rendezvous	Jean Delannoy	Annie Girardot, Andréa Parisy, Odile Versois	Crime	Co-production with France
The Return of Doctor Mabuse	Harald Reinl	Gert Fröbe, Lex Barker, Daliah Lavi	—N/a	West German-French-Italian co-production
Revolt of the Mercenaries	Piero Costa	Virginia Mayo, Conrado San Martín, Susana Canales	Historical	Co-production with Spain
Rocco e le sorelle				
Romolo e Remo (Duel of the Titans)		Steve Reeves, Gordon Scott	Peplum	
Sacco in plypac				
Sansone	Gionfranci Parolini	Brad Harris	Peplum	
Scandali al mare				
Scano Boa				
Solimano il conquistatore				
Solitudine				
Sua Eccellenza si fermò a mangiare				
Séptimo paralelo				
The Story of Joseph and His Brethren	Luciano Ricci	Geoffrey Horne, Robert Morley, Belinda Lee	Drama	
Teddy, l'orsacchiotto vagabondo				
Then There Were Three				
The Joy of Living	René Clément			Entered into the 1961 Cannes Film Festival
Torino nei cent'anni				
Tototruffa '62				
Totò, Peppino e la dolce vita				
Tout l'or du monde				
Trionfo di Maciste				
The Triumph of Michael Strogoff	Viktor Tourjansky	Curd Jürgens, Capucine, Claude Titre	Adventure	Co-production with France
Tropico di notte				
Tu ne tueras point				
Un figlio d'oggi				
Un giorno da leoni				
Un quarto d'Italia				
Un soir sur la plage				
Una spada nell'ombra				
A Difficult Life (Una vita difficile)	Dino Risi	Alberto Sordi, Lea Massari, Franco Fabrizi, Claudio Gora	Commedia all'italiana	
Une aussi longue absence				
Uomini e mare				
Ursus			Peplum	
Vacanze alla baia d'argento				
Vanina Vanini	Roberto Rossellini	Sandra Milo, Laurent Terzieff, Martine Carol, Paolo Stoppa	Drama	Based on Stendhal's novel Vanina Vanini
Venere creola	Lorenzo Ricciardi	Calvin Lockhart, Helen Williams		
Viva l'Italia!				
Vive Henri IV... vive l'amour!				
Walter e i suoi cugini				
Werewolf in a Girls' Dormitory	Paolo Heusch	Barbara Lass, Carl Schell, Curt Lowens	Horror	
Who Are You, Mr. Sorge?				
World in My Pocket	Alvin Rakoff	Rod Steiger, Nadia Tiller, Marisa Merlini	—N/a	West German-French-Italian co-production

== Notes ==
=== References ===
- Curti, Roberto (2015). Italian Gothic Horror Films, 1957-1969. McFarland. ISBN 978-1476619897.
- Curti, Roberto (2016). Tonino Valerii: The Films. McFarland. ISBN 978-1476626185.
- Curti, Roberto (2017). Riccardo Freda: The Life and Works of a Born Filmmaker. McFarland. ISBN 978-1476628387.
- Kinnard, Roy; Crnkovich, Tony (2017). Italian Sword and Sandal Films, 1908–1990. McFarland. ISBN 978-1476627045.
