= List of Soviet films of 1961 =

A list of films produced in the Soviet Union in 1961 (see 1961 in film).

== 1961 ==
Title	Russian title	Director	Cast	Genre	Notes
1961
Absolutely Seriously	Совершенно серьезно	Eldar Ryazanov, Naum Trakhtenberg, Eduard Zmoiro, Vladimir Semakov and Leonid Gaidai		Comedy	
Adventures of Krosh	Приключения Кроша	Genrikh Oganisyan	Nikolai Tomashevsky	Adventure	
Alyonka	Алёнка	Boris Barnet	Natalya Ovodova	Comedy	
April	Апрель (Geo. აპრილი)	Otar Iosseliani	Tatyana Chanturia, Gia Chiraqadze, Akakiy Chikvaidze	Romance	
Barrier of the Unknown	Барьер неизвестности	Nikita Kurikhin	Vyacheslav Shalevich, Ella Sumskaya, Nikolai Gritsenko, Aleksandr Grave	Science fiction	
Moonshiners	Самогонщики	Leonid Gaidai	Yuri Nikulin, Georgi Vitsin, Yevgeni Morgunov	Comedy, short	
But What If This Is Love	А если это любовь?	Yuli Raizman	Zhanna Prokhorenko	Drama	
Chasing Two Hares	За двумя зайцами	Viktor Ivanov	Oleg Borisov; Margarita Krinitsina	Romantic comedy	
Chronicle of Flaming Years	Повесть пламенных лет	Yuliya Solntseva	Boris Andreyev	Historical drama	Entered into the 1961 Cannes Film Festival
Clear Skies	Чистое небо	Grigori Chukhrai	Yevgeni Urbansky	Drama, romance	Won the Grand Prix at the 2nd Moscow International Film Festival
The Cossacks	Казаки	Vasili Pronin	Leonid Gubanov, Boris Andreyev, Zinaida Kiriyenko, Eduard Bredun, Boris Novikov	Drama	Entered into the 1961 Cannes Film Festival
Dersu Uzala	Дерсу Узала	Agasi Babayan	Adolf Shestakov, Kasym Zhakibayev, Aleksandr Baranov, N. Gladkov, Lev Lobov	Adventure	
Dima Gorin's Career	Карьера Димы Горина	Frunze Dovlatyan, Lev Mirsky	Aleksandr Demyanenko	Comedy	
Dog Barbos and Unusual Cross	Пёс Барбос и необычный кросс	Leonid Gaidai	Yuri Nikulin, Georgi Vitsin, Yevgeni Morgunov	Comedy, short	Nominated for best short film at the 1961 Cannes Film Festival.
The Girls	Девчата	Yuri Chulyukin	Nadezhda Rumyantseva, Nikolai Rybnikov, Lyusyena Ovchinnikova	Comedy	
The Horizon	Горизонт	Iosif Kheifits	Yuri Tolubeyev	Drama	
How Robinson Was Created	Как создавался Робинзон	Eldar Ryazanov	Anatoli Papanov, Sergey Filippov	Comedy	
Judgment of the Mad	Суд сумасшедших	Grigori Roshal	Vasily Livanov	Drama	
The Key	Ключ	Lev Atamanov		Animation	
The Man from Nowhere	Человек ниоткуда	Eldar Ryazanov	Sergey Yursky	Comedy	
Mission	Командировка	Yuri Yegorov	Oleg Efremov	Drama	
My Friend, Kolka!	Друг мой, Колька	Aleksei Saltykov	Saveliy Kramarov, Yuri Nikulin, Anatoly Kuznetsov	Drama	
The Night Before Christmas	Вечера на хуторе близ Диканьки	Aleksandr Rou	Alexander Khvylya	Comedy, Fantasy, Romance	
Peace to Him Who Enters	Мир входящему	Aleksandr Alov, Vladimir Naumov	Lidiya Shaporenko, Aleksandr Demyanenko, Andrei Fajt	Drama	
Planeta Bur	Планета Бурь	Pavel Klushantsev	Vladimir Yemelyanov	Science-fiction	
Scarlet Sails	Алые паруса	Alexandr Ptushko	Anastasiya Vertinskaya, Vasily Lanovoy	Romance	
Sluttish	Гулящая	Ivan Kavaleridze	Lyudmila Gurchenko, Rita Gladunko,	Drama	Based on novel by Panas Myrny
The Steamroller and the Violin	Каток и скрипка	Andrei Tarkovsky	Igor Fomchenko, Vladimir Zamansky	Drama, short	
Striped Trip	Полосатый рейс	Vladimir Fetin	Aleksei Gribov, Ivan Dmitriyev, Margarita Nazarova, Evgeni Leonov	Comedy	
When the Trees Were Tall	Когда деревья были большими	Lev Kulidzhanov	Yuri Nikulin, Inna Gulaya, Vasily Shukshin, Leonid Kuravlyov	Drama	Entered into the 1962 Cannes Film Festival
Wind of Freedom	Вольный ветер	Leonid Trauberg, Andrey Tutyshkin	Lionella Pyryeva	Comedy	
Yevdokiya	Евдокия	Tatyana Lioznova	Lyudmila Khityaeva	Drama	

== See also ==
- 1961 in the Soviet Union
