= 1961 Elbarusovo school fire =

1961 fire in the Soviet Union

Coordinates: 55.7°N 37.6°E

- Date: 5 November 1961
- Location: Elbarusovo, Chuvash ASSR, Russian SFSR, Soviet Union
- Cause: Spilled gasoline and a wood fire
- Deaths: 110

The 1961 Elbarusovo school fire was a fire that occurred on 5 November 1961 in Elbarusovo, Chuvash ASSR, Russian SFSR, Soviet Union.

== Fire ==
The day of the fire the village was utilizing the school building on a Sunday as a concert area to celebrate the November 7 anniversary of the October Revolution. To make space the desks had been pushed against the windows and walls and stacked upon on another. Although the Soviet press did not report the disaster, internal documents from a November 9 meeting of the Chuvash Regional Committee of the Soviet Communist Party and the November 19 meeting in Moscow of the Central Committee of the Party concluded that a physics teacher at the school, M. N. Iritkov, was sent to relight a wood stove in order to provide heat to the building and poured gasoline from a bucket.

Rather than warning the students, Iritkov and the principal, S. I. Yarutkin, fled the building. Iritkov was sentenced to 10 years in prison, and Yarutkin to 8 years ("Иритков получил 10 лет лишения свободы, а Ярукин – 8").

== Legacy ==
Most of the Soviet public didn't know about the disaster until November 5, 1991, the thirtieth anniversary of the tragedy, when the Soviet media covered the first public memorial to the victims for the first time ("Только 5 ноября 1991 года благодаря «горбачёвской гласности», впервые была публично отмечена эта дата.") among them forty-four children aged under eight and four teachers.
