= Sergei Nozikov =

Russian footballer

Personal information
- Full name: Sergei Ivanovich Nozikov
- Date of birth: 30 March 1961 (age 65)
- Height: 1.74 m (5 ft 8 1/2 in)
- Positions: Midfielder; defender

Senior career*
Years	Team	Apps	(Gls)
1983–1986	FC Stroitel Cherepovets		
1987–1990	FC Tsement Novorossiysk	127	(8)
1990	FC Kuzbass Kemerovo	2	(0)
1991–1997	FC Zhemchuzhina Sochi	149	(4)

Managerial career
- 1998–1999: FC Zhemchuzhina Sochi (assistant)
- * Club domestic league appearances and goals

Sergei Ivanovich Nozikov (Russian: Серге́й Иванович Нозиков; born 30 March 1961) is a former Russian professional footballer.

== Club career ==
He made his professional debut in the Soviet Second League in 1983 for FC Stroitel Cherepovets.
