= Bengali films of the 1960s =

Bengali films of the 1960s could refer to:

- List of Bangladeshi films#1960s
- Lists of Indian Bengali films#1960s
