= Invasion of the Neptune Men =

Japanese name
- Kanji: 宇宙快速船
Transcriptions
- Revised Hepburn: Uchū Kaisokusen
- Directed by: Koji Ota
- Screenplay by: Shin Morita
- Produced by: Hiroishi Okawa
- Starring: Sonny Chiba
- Cinematography: Shizuka Fujii
- Edited by: Kan Suzuki
- Music by: Hajime Kaburagi
- Production company: Toei Company
- Release date: July 19, 1961 (Japan)
- Running time: 75 minutes
- Country: Japan
- Language: Japanese

Invasion of the Neptune Men (宇宙快速船, Uchū Kaisokusen) (Note: Also known as The Space Greyhound) is a 1961 superhero film produced by Toei Company Ltd. The film stars Sonny Chiba as Iron Sharp (called Space Chief in the U. S. version).

The film was released in 1961 in Japan and was later released in 1964 direct to television in the United States. Often considered to be one of the worst movies ever made, the film was featured in an episode of Mystery Science Theater 3000 in 1997.

== Plot ==
Astronomer Shinichi Tachibana has a secret identity as the superhero Iron Sharp (Note: Called Space Chief in the film's English dub.) and is adored by children. When they are attacked by a group of metallic aliens (the titular Neptune Men of the English-dub), Iron Sharp drives them away. Afterwards, the resourceful Tachibana helps develop an electric barrier to block the aliens from coming to Earth. After suffering several losses at the hands of the Iron Sharp, they announce their invasion of Earth, throwing the world into a state of panic. The aliens destroy entire cities with their mothership and smaller fighters. After Iron Sharp destroys multiple enemy ships, Japan fires nuclear missiles at the mothership, destroying it.

== Cast ==
- Sonny Chiba as scientist Shinichi Tachibana / Iron Sharp
- Kappei Matsumoto as Dr. Tanigawa
- Ryuko Minakami as Yōko (Tanigawa's daughter)
- Shinjirō Ehara as scientist Yanagida
- Mitsue Komiya as scientist Saitō

== Production ==
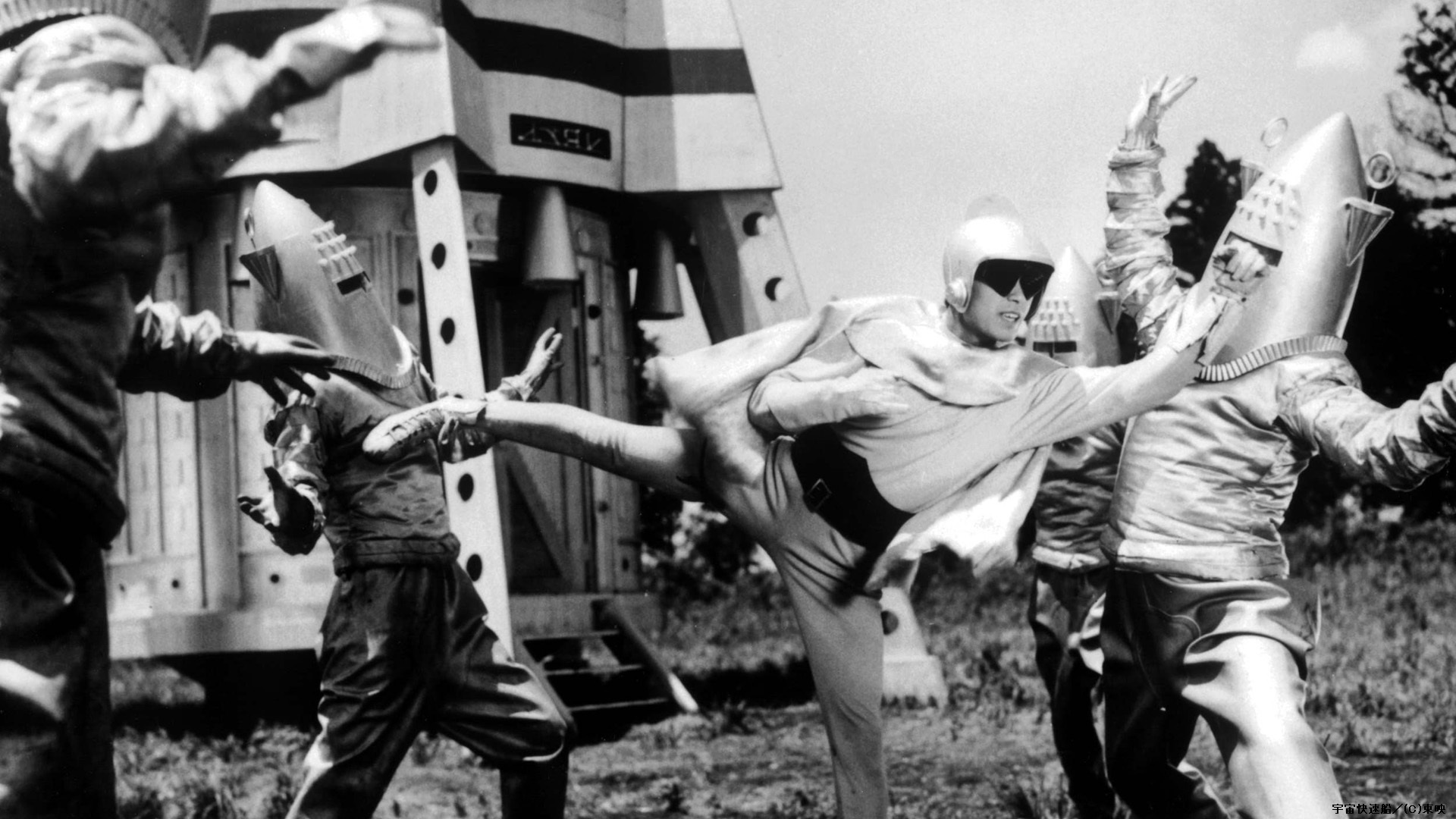
Sonny Chiba fights the alien invasion as Iron Sharp

Invasion of the Neptune Men is part of Japan's tokusatsu genre, which involves science fiction and/or superhero films that feature heavy use of special effects. The film was an early role for Sonny Chiba, who began working in Japanese television with his first starring role as Seven Color Mask in 1960. Chiba continued working back and forth between television and film until the late 1960s when he became a more popular star.

== Release ==
Uchū Kaisokusen was released in Japan on 19 July 1961. The film was not released theatrically in the United States, but instead directly to American television by Walter Manley on March 20, 1964, dubbed in English and retitled Invasion of the Neptune Men.

The film was also variously released as Space Chief, Space Greyhound, and Invasion from a Planet.

== Reception and legacy ==
In a later review of the film, Bruce Eder of AllMovie gave the film a one-star rating out of five, stating that the film was "the kind of movie that gave Japanese science fiction films a bad name. The low-quality special effects, the non-existent acting, the bad dubbing, and the chaotic plotting and pacing were all of a piece with what critics had been saying, erroneously, about the Godzilla movies for years." Eder referred to the film's "cheesy special effects and ridiculous dialogue taking on a sort of so-bad-they're-good charm", and described the film as a "thoroughly memorable (if not necessarily enjoyable, outside of the MST3K continuum) specimen of bad cinema."

On October 11, 1997 the film was featured on a season 8 episode of the American television show Mystery Science Theater 3000. Eder described the episode as a memorable one, specifically the cast watching the repetitive aerial dogfights between spaceships, and the line "suddenly Independence Day seems a richly nuanced movie". Other moments included the observation of excessive use of World War II stock footage in the action scenes (notably during a shot featuring a picture of Adolf Hitler in a building), a "Who's On First?"-style routine about Noh theater, and a visit from Prince of Space's villain Phantom of Krankor to cheer up the Satellite of Love crew.

In his book Japanese Science Fiction, Fantasy and Horror Films, Stuart Galbraith IV stated that the film "had a few surprises" despite a "woefully familiar script". Galbraith noted that the film was not as over-the-top as Prince of Space and that the opticals in the film were as strong as anything Toho had produced at the time. Galbraith suggested the effects may have been lifted from Toei's The Final War (aka World War III Breaks Out) from 1961.

== See also ==
- List of Japanese films of 1961
- List of Mystery Science Theater 3000 episodes
- List of science fiction films of the 1960s
