= Goliath Against the Giants =

- Directed by: Guido Malatesta
- Screenplay by: Arpad DeRiso; Gianfranco Parolini; Cesare Seccia
- Story by: Cesare Seccia; Giovanni Simonelli; Sergio Sollima
- Starring: Brad Harris; Gloria Milland; Fernando Rey; Barbara Carroll
- Cinematography: Alejandro Ulloa
- Edited by: Edmond Lozzi; Mario Sansoni
- Music by: Carlo Innocenzi
- Release date: 14 May 1961 (Italy)
- Running time: 98 minutes

Goliath Against the Giants (Italian: Goliath contro i giganti) is a 1961 Italian film directed by Guido Malatesta. It was Brad Harris's debut as a lead actor.

== Cast ==
- Brad Harris: Goliath
- Gloria Milland: Princess Elea
- Fernando Rey: Bokan
- Barbara Carroll: Daina
- Carmen de Lirio: Diamira
- Pepe Rubio: Briseo (credited as José Rubio)
- Fernando Sancho: Namathos
- Nello Pazzafini: Jagoran

== Release ==
Goliath Against the Giants was released as Goliath contro I giganti in Italy on 14 May 1961. It was released in the United States on 14 April 1963.

== Reception ==
A review in the Monthly Film Bulletin referred to the film as "dispiriting compendrium of strip-cartoon cliches whose rousingly and absurdly crowded climax fails to compensate for inexperienced direction, murky colour photography and shame-faced cutting."

== See also ==
- List of Italian films of 1961
