= List of West German films of 1961 =

List of films produced in West Germany in 1961

List of West German films of 1961. Feature films produced and distributed in West Germany in 1961.

== Feature films ==
Title	Director	Cast	Genre	Notes
Adieu, Lebewohl, Goodbye	Paul Martin	Bibi Johns, Senta Berger, Trude Herr	Musical	
Always Trouble with the Bed	Rudolf Schündler	Senta Berger, Günter Pfitzmann, Trude Herr	Comedy	
Auf Wiedersehen	Harald Philipp	Gert Fröbe, Joachim Fuchsberger, Elke Sommer	War, Comedy	
Bankraub in der Rue Latour	Curd Jürgens	Curd Jürgens, Ingeborg Schöner, Charles Régnier, Klaus Kinski	Crime comedy	
Barbara	Frank Wisbar	Harriet Andersson, Helmut Griem, Hans von Borsody	Drama	
Beloved Impostor	Ákos Ráthonyi	Nadja Tiller, Elke Sommer, Walter Giller, Dietmar Schönherr	Comedy	
Black Gravel	Helmut Käutner	Ingmar Zeisberg, Helmut Wildt	Drama	
Blind Justice	Harald Philipp	Peter van Eyck, Marianne Koch, Eva Bartok	Crime	a.k.a. Unter Ausschluß der Öffentlichkeit a.k.a. Unter Ausschluss der Öffentlichkeit
Daniella by Night	Max Pécas	Elke Sommer, Ivan Desny, Helmut Schmid	Spy	French-West German co-production
Darling	Rafael Gil	Marianne Hold, Vicente Parra, Horst Frank	Comedy	Spanish-West German co-production
The Dead Eyes of London	Alfred Vohrer	Joachim Fuchsberger, Karin Baal, Dieter Borsche, Eddi Arent, Klaus Kinski, Ady Berber	Mystery thriller	Based on Edgar Wallace
The Devil's Daffodil	Ákos Ráthonyi	Joachim Fuchsberger, Christopher Lee, Sabina Sesselmann, Albert Lieven, Marius Goring, Klaus Kinski	Mystery thriller	Based on Edgar Wallace. West German-British co-production
The Dream of Lieschen Mueller	Helmut Käutner	Sonja Ziemann, Martin Held, Helmut Griem, Cornelia Froboess	Musical comedy	
Escape to Berlin	Will Tremper	Christian Doermer, Narziss Sokatscheff, Susanne Korda	Drama	
The Forger of London	Harald Reinl	Karin Dor, Hellmut Lange, Siegfried Lowitz, Eddi Arent	Mystery thriller	Based on Edgar Wallace
Freddy and the Millionaire	Paul May	Freddy Quinn, Heinz Erhardt, Grit Boettcher	Musical comedy	West German-Italian co-production
Girl from Hong Kong	Franz Peter Wirth	Helmut Griem, Akiko Wakabayashi, Hanns Lothar	Drama	
The Girl with the Narrow Hips	Johannes Kai	Hannelore Elsner, Claus Wilcke, Barbara Valentin	Drama	
The Green Archer	Jürgen Roland	Gert Fröbe, Karin Dor, Klausjürgen Wussow, Eddi Arent, Wolfgang Völz	Mystery thriller	Based on Edgar Wallace
Hamlet	Franz Peter Wirth	Maximilian Schell, Hans Caninenberg, Wanda Rotha, Dunja Movar, Karl Michael Vogler	Drama	
Der Hochtourist	Ulrich Erfurth	Willy Millowitsch, Helen Vita, Beppo Brem	Comedy	
Isola Bella	Hans Grimm	Marianne Hold, Paul Hubschmid	Comedy	
It Can't Always Be Caviar	Géza von Radványi	O. W. Fischer, Eva Bartok, Senta Berger, Geneviève Cluny, Jean Richard, Werner Peters	Crime comedy, War, Adventure	a.k.a. Operation Caviar. West German-French co-production
Kauf dir einen bunten Luftballon	Géza von Cziffra	Ina Bauer, Toni Sailer, Heinz Erhardt	Musical comedy	West German-Austrian co-production
The Last Chapter	Wolfgang Liebeneiner	Hansjörg Felmy, Karin Baal, Helmuth Lohner, Klausjürgen Wussow	Drama	
The Last of Mrs. Cheyney	Franz Josef Wild	Lilli Palmer, Carlos Thompson, Martin Held, Françoise Rosay	Comedy	a.k.a. Frau Cheneys Ende. West German-French co-production
Lebensborn	Werner Klingler	Maria Perschy, Joachim Hansen, Harry Meyen, Marisa Mell	War	a.k.a. Ordered to Love a.k.a. Women Ordered to Love
The Liar	Ladislao Vajda	Heinz Rühmann	Comedy	
The Marriage of Mr. Mississippi	Kurt Hoffmann	O. E. Hasse, Johanna von Koczian, Hansjörg Felmy, Martin Held, Charles Régnier	Black comedy	Entered into the 11th Berlin International Film Festival
The Miracle of Father Malachia	Bernhard Wicki	Horst Bollmann	Comedy, Fantasy	Entered into the 11th Berlin International Film Festival
Murder Party	Helmut Ashley	Magali Noël, Harry Meyen, Götz George, Georges Rivière, Robert Graf	Thriller	a.k.a. Mörderspiel. West German-French co-production
My Husband, the Economic Miracle	Ulrich Erfurth	Marika Rökk, Fritz Tillmann, Cornelia Froboess	Comedy	
The Nina B. Affair	Robert Siodmak	Nadja Tiller, Pierre Brasseur, Walter Giller, Charles Régnier	Drama	West German-French co-production
One Prettier Than the Other	Axel von Ambesser	Heidi Brühl, Senta Berger, Peter Vogel	Comedy	
Only the Wind	Fritz Umgelter	Freddy Quinn, Gustav Knuth, Cordula Trantow	Musical	
Our House in Cameroon	Alfred Vohrer	Götz George, Johanna von Koczian, Horst Frank, Hans Söhnker, Kenneth Spencer	Adventure	
The Phony American	Ákos Ráthonyi	Michael Hinz, Christine Kaufmann, William Bendix, Ron Randell	Crime comedy	
Pichler's Books Are Not in Order	Hans Quest	Theo Lingen, Georg Thomalla, Karin Dor	Comedy	
Question 7	Stuart Rosenberg	Christian De Bresson, Almut Eggert, Erik Schumann, Fritz Wepper	Drama	American-West German co-production
Ramona	Paul Martin	Senta Berger, Joachim Hansen, Georg Thomalla, Judith Dornys, The Blue Diamonds	Musical comedy	
The Return of Doctor Mabuse	Harald Reinl	Gert Fröbe, Lex Barker, Daliah Lavi, Werner Peters, Ady Berber, Wolfgang Preiss	Thriller	West German-Italian-French co-production
Das Riesenrad	Géza von Radványi	Maria Schell, O. W. Fischer	Drama	Entered into the 2nd Moscow International Film Festival
Riviera Story	Wolfgang Becker	Ulla Jacobsson, Wolfgang Preiss, Hartmut Reck	Drama	
Robert and Bertram	Hans Deppe	Willy Millowitsch, Vico Torriani	Comedy	
The Shadows Grow Longer	Ladislao Vajda	Luise Ullrich, Barbara Rütting, Hansjörg Felmy, Loni von Friedl	Drama	Swiss-West German co-production
The Strange Countess	Josef von Báky	Joachim Fuchsberger, Lil Dagover, Klaus Kinski, Brigitte Grothum, Edith Hancke, Fritz Rasp, Rudolf Fernau, Reinhard Kolldehoff, Eddi Arent, Marianne Hoppe	Mystery thriller	Based on Edgar Wallace
Taxi for Tobruk	Denys de La Patellière	Charles Aznavour, Lino Ventura, Hardy Krüger	War	French-West German co-production
There Is Still Room in Hell	Ernst R. von Theumer	Barbara Valentin, Paul Glawion, Hermann Nehlsen, Maria Vincent, Fikret Hakan, Sadri Alışık	Crime	West German-Turkish co-production
This Time It Must Be Caviar	Géza von Radványi	O.W. Fischer, Eva Bartok, Senta Berger	Comedy thriller	
Three Men in a Boat	Helmut Weiss	Walter Giller, Heinz Erhardt, Hans-Joachim Kulenkampff	Comedy	
Town Without Pity	Gottfried Reinhardt	Kirk Douglas, Christine Kaufmann, E. G. Marshall, Robert Blake, Barbara Rütting, Hans Nielsen, Ingrid van Bergen	Drama	American-West German-Swiss co-production
The Transport	Jürgen Roland	Hannes Messemer, Armin Dahlen, Inge Langen	War drama	
Treibjagd auf ein Leben	Ralph Lothar	Ingrid Andree, Horst Frank, Dietmar Schönherr	Thriller	a.k.a. Terror Calls at Night
Two Among Millions	Victor Vicas, Wieland Liebske	Hardy Krüger, Loni von Friedl, Walter Giller	Drama	
Und sowas nennt sich Leben	Géza von Radványi	Karin Baal, Michael Hinz, Elke Sommer	Drama	
Until Hell Is Frozen	Leopold Lahola	Götz George, Charles Millot	War	a.k.a. Der Teufel spielte Balalaika
Via Mala	Paul May	Gert Fröbe, Joachim Hansen, Christine Kaufmann	Drama	
What Is Father Doing in Italy?	Hans Dieter Schwarze	Willy Fritsch, Gerhard Riedmann, Peter Kraus, Harald Juhnke	Musical comedy	
Who Are You, Mr. Sorge?	Yves Ciampi	Thomas Holtzmann, Mario Adorf, Keiko Kishi, Eitarō Ozawa, Kōji Nanbara, Nadine Basile, Ingrid van Bergen	War, Spy thriller	French-Japanese-West German-Italian co-production
World in My Pocket	Alvin Rakoff	Rod Steiger, Nadja Tiller, Peter van Eyck, Jean Servais, Ian Bannen	Crime	a.k.a. An einem Freitag um halb zwölf. West German-Italian-French co-production
You Must Be Blonde on Capri	Wolfgang Schleif	Karin Baal, Helmuth Lohner, Hans Nielsen, Nadja Regin, Maurizio Arena	Comedy	
Zu jung für die Liebe?	Erica Balqué	Loni von Friedl	Drama	

== Documentaries and television films ==
Title	Director	Cast	Genre	Notes
Affairs of State	Volker von Collande	Hertha Feiler, Friedrich Domin, Jürgen Goslar	Comedy	a.k.a. Staatsaffairen a.k.a. Staatsaffären
Aimée	Raoul Wolfgang Schnell	Hannelore Schroth, Karl Michael Vogler, Rolf Boysen	Comedy	
Alice Sit-by-the-Fire	Paul Verhoeven	Luise Ullrich, Karl Schönböck, Lis Verhoeven, Vera Tschechowa, Hans Reiser	Comedy	a.k.a. Froher Herbst des Lebens
All My Sons	Franz Peter Wirth	Paul Dahlke, Alice Treff, Götz George	Drama	
Ein Augenzeuge	Gustav Burmester	Werner Bruhns, Anneli Granget	Crime	a.k.a. False Witness
Aus Gründen der Sicherheit	Konrad Wagner	Siegfried Lowitz	Drama	
Biographie eines Schokoladentages	Peter Lilienthal	Ludwig Thiesen, Elke Arendt, Max Haufler	Comedy	
Brief Encounter	Peter Beauvais	Agnes Fink, Peter Pasetti	Drama	a.k.a. Zwischen den Zügen
Brutality in Stone	Alexander Kluge, Peter Schamoni		Documentary	Short film
Clash by Night	Gustav Burmester	Eva Katharina Schultz, Ullrich Haupt, Heinz Drache, Anneli Granget	Drama	a.k.a. Unseliger Sommer
Counsellor at Law	Franz Josef Wild	Carl-Heinz Schroth, Barbara Rütting, Eric Pohlmann	Drama	
The Country Girl	Horst Balzer	Ernst Deutsch, Hannelore Schroth, Heinz Drache	Drama	a.k.a. Ein Mädchen vom Lande
Cue for Passion	John Olden	Hartmut Reck, Gisela Uhlen, Wolfgang Büttner, Ingmar Zeisberg	Drama	a.k.a. Ruf zur Leidenschaft
A Death in the Family	Kurt Horwitz	Peter Pasetti, Heinz Drache, Ann Smyrner, Agnes Fink	Crime	a.k.a. Unerwartet verschied ...
Dinner with the Family	Walter Rilla	Heinz Bennent, Ingrid Pan, Gisela Trowe, Herbert Fleischmann	Comedy	a.k.a. Das Rendezvous von Senlis
Elisabeth von England	Hanns Korngiebel	Elisabeth Flickenschildt, Carl Lange, Hermann Schomberg, Peter Mosbacher	Drama	
The Emperor Jones	Wilhelm Semmelroth	Kenneth Spencer, Siegfried Wischnewski	Drama	
Der entscheidende Augenblick	Imo Moszkowicz	Mathias Wieman, Günther Tabor	Drama	a.k.a. The Decisive Moment a.k.a. Panic Button
Das exaltierte Fräulein	Max Peter Ammann	Claudia Sorbas, Karl Michael Vogler, Irene Marhold, Benno Sterzenbach	Comedy	a.k.a. Los melindres de Belisa
Familienpapiere	Kurt Wilhelm	Carl-Heinz Schroth	Crime comedy	a.k.a. Une histoire de brigands
Der Feind	Hans-Reinhard Müller	Agnes Fink, Pinkas Braun, Peter Arens, Peter Lühr	Drama	a.k.a. L'ennemi
Flight to Afar	Rainer Wolffhardt	Robert Graf, Paul Dahlke, Carl Lange	Drama	a.k.a. Sansibar
Der Flüchtling	Werner Völger	Erik Schumann, Ruth Maria Kubitschek, Hanns Ernst Jäger	Drama	a.k.a. The Refugee a.k.a. The Fugitive
Focus	Rolf Hädrich	Hans Caninenberg, Lola Müthel, Hans Helmut Dickow	Drama	a.k.a. Brennpunkt
General Quixotte	Peter Beauvais	Fritz Tillmann, Werner Finck, Gerd Baltus, Angelika Bender, Rudolf Rhomberg	Comedy	a.k.a. The Fighting Cock a.k.a. L'Hurluberlu ou le Réactionnaire amoureux
Die göttliche Jette	Alfred Braun	Sabine Hahn, Lucie Mannheim, Rudolf Platte	Musical, Biography	
The Grand Tour	William Dieterle	Agnes Fink, Paul Hubschmid, Werner Finck, Ingmar Zeisberg	Drama	
The Haven	Gustav Burmester	Hannelore Schroth, Wolfgang Kieling	Drama	a.k.a. Zuflucht
Hello, Hello Japan	Hans H. Hermann, Walter Knoop	Hans C. Daniel, Takarazuka Kagekidan	Documentary	West German-Japanese co-productuion
Invitation to the Castle	Klaus Wagner	Harald Leipnitz, Ingrid Ernest, Krista Keller	Comedy	a.k.a. Ring Round the Moon
Jack Mortimer	Michael Kehlmann	Gunther Malzacher, Ingrid van Bergen, Horst Niendorf, Hertha Martin	Thriller	
Johnny Belinda	Franz Josef Wild	Violetta Ferrari, Hellmut Lange	Drama	
The Journalists	Fritz Umgelter	Alfred Schieske, Dagmar Altrichter, Karl Walter Diess, Heinz Weiss	Comedy	a.k.a. Die Journalisten
Judgement Day	Michael Kehlmann	Klausjürgen Wussow, Ilse Steppat	Drama	a.k.a. Der jüngste Tag
Kahl	Haro Senft		Documentary	Short film
Die Kassette	Rudolf Noelte	Theo Lingen	Comedy	
Kiss Me, Kate	Imo Moszkowicz	Hannelore Schroth, Gerhard Riedmann, Christiane Maybach, Harald Leipnitz, Horst Tappert, Peter Carsten	Musical	
Korczak und die Kinder	Sam Besekow	Friedrich Domin, Paul Edwin Roth	War, Drama	a.k.a. Doctor Korczak and the Children
Die Kurve	Peter Zadek	Klaus Kinski, Helmut Qualtinger, Gernot Duda	Black comedy	a.k.a. The Curve
The Lesson	Sylvain Dhomme	Robert Freitag, Krista Keller, Therese Giehse	Black comedy	
Liselott	Kurt Wilhelm	Gerlinde Locker, Peter Arens	Musical	
Look Homeward, Angel	John Olden	René Deltgen, Inge Meysel, Dietmar Schönherr, Christoph Bantzer	Drama	
Lysistrata	Fritz Kortner	Romy Schneider, Barbara Rütting, Ruth Maria Kubitschek	Drama	
Madame de...	Peter Beauvais	Karin Hübner, Fritz Tillmann, Pinkas Braun, Werner Finck	Drama	a.k.a. The Earrings of Madame de...
Der Mann von draußen	Wilm ten Haaf	Lil Dagover, Hans Helmut Dickow	Thriller	a.k.a. The Man
Der Mann von drüben	Wilm ten Haaf	Rudolf Platte, Hellmut Lange, Alexander Kerst	Drama	
Die Marquise von Arcis	Falk Harnack	Uta Sax, Hilde Krahl, Alexander Kerst, Brigitte Mira	Comedy	a.k.a. The Mask of Virtue
Mary Rose	Edward Rothe	Heidelinde Weis, Dietmar Schönherr	Fantasy	
The Merry Vineyard	Hermann Pfeiffer	Erwin Linder, Monika Dahlberg	Drama	a.k.a. Der fröhliche Weinberg
Die Mitschuldigen	Hans Schweikart	Gertrud Kückelmann, Alfred Balthoff, Jürgen Goslar, Peter Schütte	Crime comedy	
A Moon for the Misbegotten	Ludwig Cremer	Heinz Reincke, Martha Wallner, Walter Richter	Drama	
Nora	Michael Kehlmann	Elfriede Kuzmany, Paul Dahlke, Manfred Inger, Horst Tappert	Drama	a.k.a. A Doll's House
Our Town	Ludwig Cremer	Cordula Trantow, Fritz Wepper, Robert Graf	Drama	
The Overcoat	Walter Henn	Walter Bluhm, Richard Münch	Drama	a.k.a. Der Mantel
Payment Deferred	Franz Peter Wirth	Wolfgang Kieling, Edith Heerdegen, Eva Pflug, Fritz Wepper	Crime	a.k.a. Zahlungsaufschub
The Persians	Hans Lietzau	Thomas Holtzmann, Elisabeth Flickenschildt, Wolfgang Büttner, Rolf Boysen, Friedrich Domin	Drama	
The Picture of Dorian Gray	Wilhelm Semmelroth	Sebastian Fischer	Drama	
The Prince of Homburg	Fritz Umgelter	Thomas Holtzmann, Ewald Balser	Drama	
Quadrille	Carl-Heinz Schroth	Anton Diffring, Viktor Staal, Karin Jacobsen, Erika von Thellmann, Bobby Todd	Comedy	
A Quiet Game of Cards	Edward Rothe	Werner Hinz, Bernhard Minetti, Leonard Steckel	Thriller	a.k.a. Das Kartenspiel
Rhinoceros	Gustav Rudolf Sellner	Bernhard Wicki	Fantasy	a.k.a. Die Nashörner
The Sacred Flame	Reinhard Elsner	Doris Kirchner, Günther Schramm, Hilde Körber, Paul Albert Krumm, Harry Wüstenhagen, Gisela Mattishent	Drama	a.k.a. Die heilige Flamme
Ein schöner Tag	Walter Henn	Trude Hesterberg, Joachim Teege, Ilse Bally, Horst Tappert	Comedy	
Schritte in der Nacht	Theo Mezger	Erik Schumann	Thriller	
Schweik in the Second World War	Rainer Wolffhardt	Hanns Ernst Jäger	War, Comedy	a.k.a. Schweyk in the Second World War
Song of Songs	Hans Schweikart	Peter Lühr, Heide von Stombeck, Karl Michael Vogler, Eva Pflug	Comedy	
Tobby	Hansjürgen Pohland	Toby Fichelscher	Music, Documentary	
Tonight in Samarkand	Edward Rothe	Barbara Rütting, Claus Holm, Gustavo Rojo	Drama	
A Touch of the Poet	Jürgen Goslar	Hans Söhnker, Judith Holzmeister, Katinka Hoffmann, Marianne Hoppe	Drama	
Tovarich	Max Peter Ammann	Lukas Ammann, Hanne Wieder, Leon Askin	Comedy	a.k.a. Towarisch
Trap for a Lonely Man	Raoul Wolfgang Schnell	Wolfgang Forester, Eva Pflug, Pinkas Braun	Thriller	a.k.a. Die Falle
Uncle Harry	Peter Beauvais	Rudolf Platte, Edith Heerdegen, Ursula Grabley	Crime drama	
Und Pippa tanzt!	Fritz Umgelter	Gitty Djamal, Peter Fricke, Gustav Knuth, Carl Wery, Wolfgang Reichmann	Drama	a.k.a. And Pippa Dances
The Vinegar Tree	Peter Beauvais	Fita Benkhoff, Sabine Sinjen, Alexander Kerst, Fritz Tillmann, Charlotte Kerr	Comedy	a.k.a. Erinnerst du dich?
Vorsätzlich	Konrad Wagner	Margot Trooger, Friedrich Joloff	Crime	a.k.a. Design for Murder
Wie einst im Mai	Thomas Engel	Peer Schmidt, Liane Croon, Gunnar Möller	Musical	
The Wild Duck	Rudolf Noelte	Dieter Borsche, Werner Hinz, Sabine Sinjen	Drama	
The Winslow Boy	Franz Peter Wirth	Peter Pasetti, Paul Dahlke, Alice Treff	Drama	a.k.a. Der Fall Winslow
Wir waren drei	Rainer Wolffhardt	Wolfgang Kieling, Wolfgang Büttner, Benno Sterzenbach, Gisela Trowe	Drama	a.k.a. Nous étions trois
X Y Z	Hans Dieter Schwarze	Erik Schumann, Grit Boettcher, Hans Holt	Comedy	
Zeit des Glücks	Rudolf Jugert	Elfriede Kuzmany, Peter Lühr, Rolf Boysen, Walter Buschhoff, Grit Boettcher, Rainer Brandt, Anaid Iplicjian	Comedy	a.k.a. Auprès de ma blonde
Zwei Krawatten	Peter Hamel	Helmut Schmid, Ingrid van Bergen, Karola Ebeling	Musical	

== Bibliography ==
- Bergfelder, Tim. International Adventures: German Popular Cinema and European Co-Productions in the 1960s. Berghahn Books, 2005.

== See also ==
- List of Austrian films of 1961
- List of East German films of 1961
