= 1989 in the Soviet Union =

- Decades: 1960s; 1970s; 1980s; 1990s
- See also: History of the Soviet Union; List of years in the Soviet Union

The following lists events that happened during 1989 in the Union of Soviet Socialist Republics.

== Incumbents ==
- General Secretary of the Communist Party of the Soviet Union — Mikhail Gorbachev
- Chairman of the Supreme Soviet of the Soviet Union — Mikhail Gorbachev
- Premier of the Soviet Union — Nikolai Ryzhkov

== Events ==
Whole Year: Revolutions of 1989

- January to February 15 — Soviet withdrawal from Afghanistan.
- February 6 — Negotiations between the Polish government and the union ‘Solidarity’ opened.
- February 24 — Singing Revolution: After 44 years, the Estonian flag is raised at Pikk Hermann tower in Tallinn.
- March 9 — Revolutions of 1989: The Soviet Union submits to the jurisdiction of the World Court.
- March 16 — The Central Committee of the Communist Party of the Soviet Union approves agricultural reforms allowing farmers the right to lease state-owned farms for life.
- March 26 — 1989 Soviet Union legislative election: first contested elections in Soviet History.
- April 7 — The Soviet submarine K-278 Komsomolets sinks in the Barents Sea, killing 41.
- April 9 — April 9 tragedy; a pro-independence demonstration in Tbilisi was put down by Soviet authorities, resulting in the deaths of 21 people.
- May 3 — The first McDonald's restaurant in the Soviet Union begins construction in Moscow.
- May 14 — Mikhail Gorbachev visits China, ending the Sino-Soviet split.
- May 18 — Lithuania declares sovereignty over all of its territory.
- May 25 — Gorbachev becomes Chairman of the Supreme Soviet of the Soviet Union.
- June 4 — Ufa train disaster, a gas pipe explosion kills hundreds.
- July 10 — 300,000 Siberian coal miners go on strike, demanding better living conditions and less bureaucracy.
- July 17 — 1989 Soviet miners' strike: The strike spreads to Ukraine.
- August 8 — The Ministry of Gas Industry changes Gazprom, an energy production and sales organization to a state-run enterprise.
- August 23 — Two million people in Estonia, Latvia and Lithuania join hands to form the Baltic Way in the Singing Revolution.
- September 14 — An agreement of co-operation between Leningrad Oblast of the Soviet Union and Nordland County of Norway was signed in Leningrad.
- September 24 — Lithuania declares 1940 annexation by the Soviet Union to be null and void.
- October 9 — Voronezh UFO incident
- November 9 — Soviet power in Eastern Europe collapses with the Fall of the Berlin Wall.
- November 28 — Communist Party of Czechoslovakia announces the end of its monopoly of power, in the Velvet Revolution.
- December 1 — In a meeting with Pope John Paul II, Mikhail Gorbachev pledges greater religious freedom for Soviet citizens.
- December 7 — The Lithuanian parliament announces the end of the political monopoly of the Communist Party of Lithuania, in the Singing Revolution.
- December 25 — Romanian leader Nicolae Ceaușescu and his wife are captured and executed in the Romanian revolution.

== Births ==
- January 14 — Inna Afinogenova, journalist
- January 23 — Arzu Aliyeva, Azerbaijani public figure who is the younger daughter of Ilham Aliyev
- January 31 — Rafael Akhmetov, Russian ice hockey player
- February 12 — Rauf Aliyev, Azerbaijani international footballer
- February 14 — Bobirjon Akbarov, Uzbekistani footballer
- February 17 — Azat Bayryev, football player
- February 28 — Tigean Avinyan, 60th Mayor of Yerevan
- April 6 — Ulugbek Alimov, Uzbekistani weightlifter
- May 13 — Roman Amirkhanov, Russian professional footballer
- May 26 — Tulabek Akramov, Uzbekistani sports administrator
- July 3 — Ilya Antonovsky, Russian professional ice hockey defenceman
- July 4 — Vyacheslav Andryushchenko, Belarusian ice hockey player
- June 12 — Kirill Akilov, Russian football player
- July 13 — Shamil Alimagomayev, Russian football midfielder
- July 18 — Semyon Antonov, Russian professional basketball player
- July 19 — Sergei Andronov, Russian professional ice hockey player
- July 21 — Sana Anarkulova, Kazakhstani volleyball player
- September 1 — Rahid Amirguliyev, Azerbaijani footballer
- September 5 — Kachorovska Alina, Ukrainian designer of shoes and accessories
- September 21 — Astemir Apanasov, Circassian singer
- October 1 — Stanislav Aseyev, Ukrainian writer and journalist
- October 9 — Georgy Alburov, Russian political and social activist, journalist and blogger
- October 17 — Vyacheslav Akimov, Ukrainian football midfielder
- October 21 — Oleg Akkuratov, Russian pianist, jazz improviser and singer
- October 28 — Alan Alborov, Russian professional football player
- November 5 — Zhannat Aitenova, Kazakhstani handball player
- November 14 — Hasan Aliyev, Azerbaijani World and European champion Greco-Roman wrestler
- November 29 — Natalya Asanova, Uzbekistani athlete
- December 3 — Vladislavs Agurjanovs, Latvian professional table tennis player

== Deaths ==
=== January ===
- January 3 — Sergei Sobolev, mathematician (b. 1908)
- January 10 — Valentin Glushko, engineer, program manager of the Soviet space program (b. 1908)
- January 24 — Sasha Putrya, Ukrainian artist (b. 1977)
- January 27 — Vasily Konovalenko, artist (b. 1929)

=== February ===
- February 2 — Yuri Bogatyryov, actor (b. 1947)
- February 7 — Simon Virsaladze, ballet, film and opera designer (b. 1909)
- February 20 — Aleksandr Medvedkin, film director (b. 1900)
- February 21 — Otar Taktakishvili, Georgian composer and conductor (b. 1924)

=== March ===
- March 3 — Vytautas Viciulis, Lithuanian painter (b. 1951)
- March 4 — Victor Nikiforov, ice hockey player and Olympic gold medalist (b. 1931)
- March 8 — Elisaveta Bykova, chess player and dual Women's World Chess Champion (b. 1913)
- March 26 — Maris Liepa, Latvian ballet dancer (b. 1936)
- March 29 — Aleksandr Prokopenko, football player (b. 1953)

=== April ===
- April 10 — Nikolai Grinko, actor (b. 1920)
- April 20 — Johan Eichfeld, biologist and politician (b. 1893)
- April 22 — Dmitry Selivanov, rock singer (b. 1964)

=== May ===
- May 2 — Veniamin Kaverin, writer and dramatist (b. 1902)
- May 4 — Lydia Pasternak Slater, research chemist and poet (b. 1902)
- May 8 — Hendrik Allik, Estonian politician (b. 1901)
- May 14 — Nikifor Kalchenko, politician (b. 1906)
- May 23 — Georgy Tovstonogov, theatre director (b. 1915)
- May 27 — Arseny Tarkovsky, poet and translator (b. 1907)

=== June ===
- June 9
  - Rashid Behbudov, singer and actor (b. 1915)
  - Vladimir Kasatonov, military leader and fleet admiral (b. 1910)
  - Piotr Vasiliev, realist painter (b. 1909)
- June 10 — Suleyman Rustam, poet, playwright and translator (b. 1906)
- June 13 — Eduard Päll, politician, linguist and writer (b. 1903)
- June 19
  - Betti Alver, Estonian poet (b. 1906)
  - Yevgeny Kabanov, Naval Aviation major general (b. 1918)
  - Andrey Prokofyev, sprinter and Olympic gold medalist (b. 1959)
- June 21 — Aleksandr Safronov, speed skater and Olympian (b. 1952)
- June 22 — Glenn Michael Souther, American sailor who turned Soviet intelligence officer (b. 1957)
- June 30 — Rostislav Plyatt, stage and film actor (b. 1908)

=== July ===
- July 1 — Victor Nekipelov, poet and writer (b. 1928)
- July 2 — Andrei Gromyko, politician and diplomat, 9th Chairman of the Presidium of the Supreme Soviet of the Soviet Union (b. 1909)
- July 4 — Leyla Mammadbeyova, first Azerbaijani female aviator (b. 1909)

=== August ===
- August 25 — Yan Frankel, composer and performer (b. 1920)

=== September ===
- September 7 — Valery Goborov, basketball player and Olympic gold medalist (b. 1966)

=== October ===
- October 13 — Merab Kostava, Georgian dissident, musician and poet (b. 1939)
- October 14 — Klavdiya Mayuchaya, javelin thrower and European champion (b. 1918)
- October 15 — Tadevos Hakobyan, Armenian historian and geographer (b. 1917)
- October 17 — Mark Krein, mathematician (b. 1907)
- October 28 — Yuliya Solntseva, actress and film director (b. 1901)

=== November ===
- November 1 — Nurtas Undasynov, 3rd Chairman of the Council of Ministers of the Kazakh Soviet Socialist Republic (b. 1904)
- November 7 — Andrey Borovykh, World War II flying ace and twice Hero of the Soviet Union (b. 1921)
- November 14 — Samand Siabandov, writer, soldier and politician (b. 1909)
- November 22 — Shamil Serikov, wrestler and Olympic gold medalist (b. 1956)
- November 28 — Georgy Ilivitsky, chess master (b. 1921)
- November 29 — Natan Eidelman, author and historian (b. 1930)

=== December ===
- December 1 — Nikolai Patolichev, 11th Minister of Foreign Trade of the Soviet Union (b. 1908)
- December 3 — Alexander Obukhov, physicist and applied mathematician (b. 1918)
- December 5 — Sofiya Kalistratova, lawyer and human rights activist (b. 1907)
- December 7 — Vadim Spiridonov, film actor and director (b. 1944)
- December 8 — Mykola Livytskyi, Ukrainian politician, prime minister and president of the Ukrainian People's Republic in-exile (b. 1907)
- December 14
  - Ants Eskola, actor (b. 1908)
  - Andrei Sakharov, nuclear physicist, dissident, human rights activist and Nobel laureate in Physics, dilated cardiomyopathy (b. 1921)
- December 19 — Kirill Mazurov, 14th First Deputy Chairman of the Council of Ministers of the Soviet Union (b. 1914)
- December 28 — Pavel Kurochkin, army general (b. 1900)

== See also ==
- 1989 in fine arts of the Soviet Union
- List of Soviet films of 1980-91
