= 1988 in the Soviet Union =

- Decades: 1960s; 1970s; 1980s; 1990s
- See also: History of the Soviet Union; List of years in the Soviet Union

The following lists events that happened during 1988 in the Union of Soviet Socialist Republics.

== Incumbents ==
- General Secretary of the Communist Party of the Soviet Union – Mikhail Gorbachev
- Chairman of the Presidium of the Supreme Soviet – Andrei Gromyko (until 1 October, then Mikhail Gorbachev)
- Premier of the Soviet Union – Nikolai Ryzhkov
- Chairman of the Supreme Court of the Soviet Union – Vladimir Terebilov

== Events ==
=== January ===
- 7 January – The decision by the Central Committee of the Communist Party of the Soviet Union, Presidium of the Supreme Soviet and the Council of Ministers of the Soviet Union to rename the city of Brezhnev to Naberezhnye Chelny is published. This was followed by the decision to remove the names of Leonid Brezhnev and Konstantin Chernenko from the names of all Soviet institutions, streets and inhabited places later that year.
- 16 January – The Presidium of the Supreme Soviet adopts a Decree on the Establishment of the State Committee for Nature Protection.
- 18 January – Aeroflot Flight 699 crashes on approach to Krasnovodsk Airport (now Turkmenbashi International Airport), killing eleven people.

=== February ===
- 12 February – American cruiser USS Yorktown and destroyer USS Caron enter Soviet territorial waters in the Black Sea, where they are bumped by the Soviet frigates Bezzavetny and SKR-6, respectively.
- 14 February – Fire breaks out in the Library of the USSR Academy of Sciences, destroying approximately 300,000 volumes. 3.5 million volumes become damp due to firefighting foam.
- 20 February – Council of People's Deputies of the Nagorno-Karabakh Autonomous Oblast (NKAO) declares the secession of the oblast from the Azerbaijan SSR, triggering the First Nagorno-Karabakh War.
- 22–23 February – Rallies in Baku and Sumgait under the slogan "NKAO is an integral part of Azerbaijan" take place.

=== March ===
- 8 March – Aeroflot Flight 3739 is hijacked en route from Irkutsk to Leningrad.
- 25 March – ASSA art rock event opens in Moscow.

=== April ===
- 5 April – Pravda publishes the article of Alexander Yakovlev "The Principles of Perestroika: The Revolutionism of Thought and Actions", which criticizes Joseph Stalin and supports perestroika.

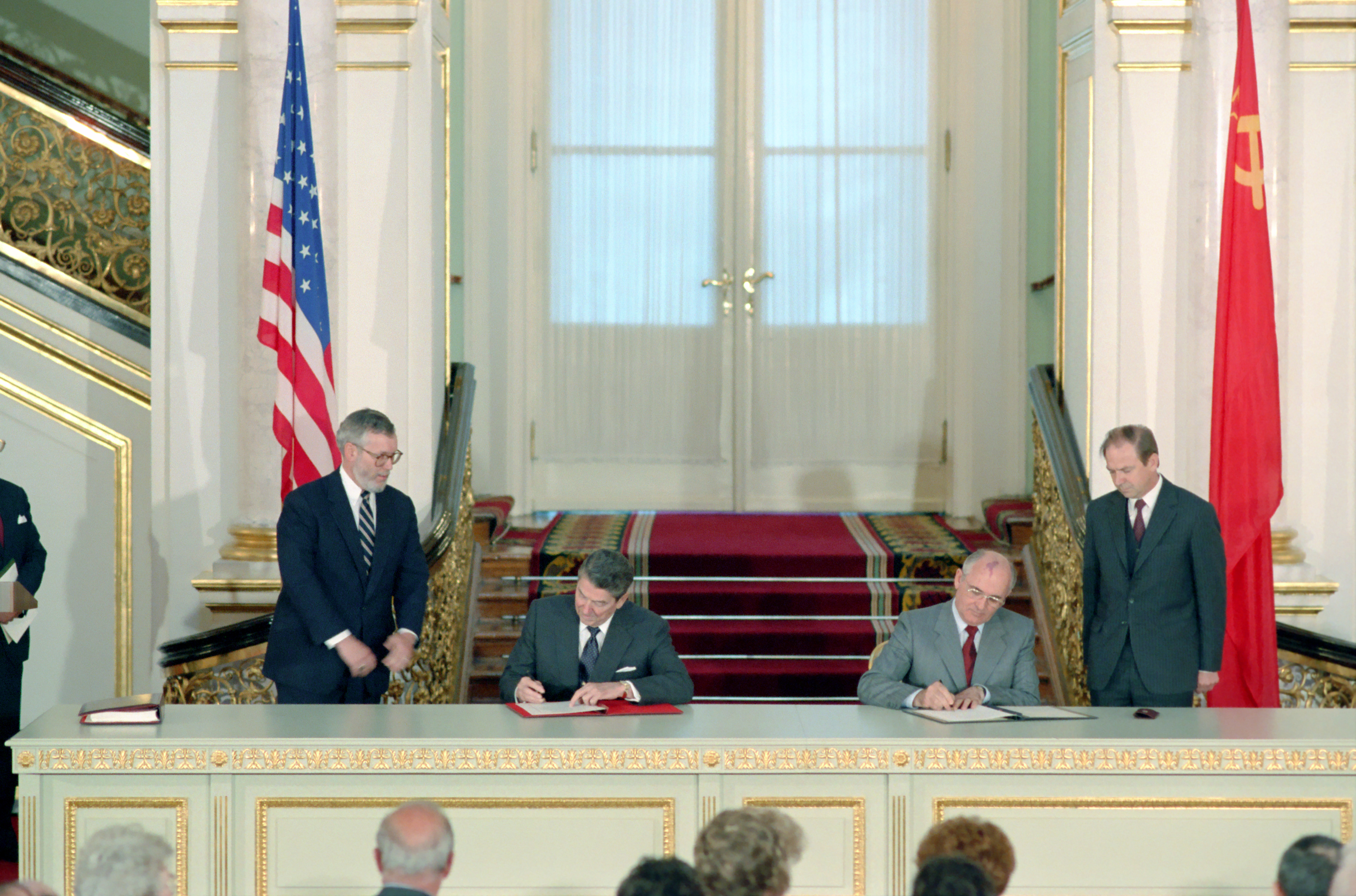
Reagan and Gorbachev during the Moscow Summit

=== May ===
- 29 May – U.S. President Ronald Reagan visits the Soviet Union. The Moscow Summit takes place. The Medium and Short-Range Missile Reduction Treaty is signed, including OTR-23 Oka as a "bonus for American partners".
- 31 May – President Reagan addresses 600 Moscow State University students.

=== June ===
- 3 June – The formation of Sąjūdis is announced in Vilnius.
- 5 June – The celebration of the 1000th anniversary of the Christianization of Rus' begins in the Yelokhovo Cathedral.
- 17 June – Moskovskiye Novosti publishes the information about Katyn massacre, demanding an investigation of the event.
- 28 June – The 19th Conference of CPSU opens in Moscow.

=== July ===
- 1 July – At the 19th All-Union Conference of the CPSU Yegor Ligachev utters his famous phrase "Boris, you are wrong".
- 12 July – The first Soviet capital beauty pageant is held. Mariya Kalinina becomes the winner.
- 26 July – The Presidium of the Supreme Soviet posthumously restores Nikolay Kuznetsov in the rank of the Admiral of the Fleet of the Soviet Union, which he lost under Stalin.

=== September ===
- 5 September – The first AIDS case in the Soviet Union kills a 29-year-old woman Olga G.

=== October ===
- 1 October – Andrei Gromyko retires from the office of Chairman of the Presidium of the Supreme Soviet.
- 7 October – The Russian tricolor is raised openly for the first time in the Soviet Union during a demonstration in Leningrad.
- 3 October – OMON is created.
- 16 October – Escrava Isaura premieres in the Soviet Union on the Central Television.

=== November ===
- 12 November – Large-scale demonstrations and hunger strike began in Tbilisi, the capital of the Georgian SSR, against the Soviet policies.
- 15 November – Buran spacecraft makes its first and only flight.
- 18 November – The Soviet Union recognizes the State of Palestine, proclaimed three days earlier in Algiers by the Palestine Liberation Organization.

=== December ===
- 1 December
  - The Supreme Soviet of the Soviet Union adopts the laws "On the Election of People's Deputies" and "On Amendments and Additions to the Constitution of the USSR".
  - The hijacking of a LAZ-687 bus with schoolchildren takes place in Ordzhonikidze.
- 7 December
  - Spitak earthquake kills several thousands of people.
  - Singing Revolution: Estonian language replaces Russian as the official language of the Estonian SSR.
- 30 December – The Central Committee of the Communist Party of the Soviet Union, Presidium of the Supreme Soviet and the Council of Ministers of the Soviet Union publish the decision to remove the names of Leonid Brezhnev and Konstantin Chernenko from the names of all institutions, streets and inhabited places.

== Births ==
- 10 January – Vladimir Zharkov, Russian ice hockey player
- 15 January – Nataliia Mandryk, Ukrainian Paralympic wheelchair fencer
- 19 January – Alexey Vorobyov, Russian singer and actor
- 3 March – Valeriy Chybineyev, Ukrainian sniper (died 2022)
- 12 March – Pavlo Lapshyn, Ukrainian criminal (died 2025)
- 19 March – Maxim Mikhaylov, Russian volleyball player
- 1 April – Alexander Bychkov, Russian serial killer
- 16 May – Martynas Gecevičius, Lithuanian basketball player
- 7 June – Ekaterina Makarova, Russian tennis player
- 12 June – Artūrs Bērziņš, Latvian basketball player
- 16 June – Pavel Kuzmich, Russian luger
- 17 September – Pavel Mamayev, Russian footballer
- 20 September – Khabib Nurmagomedov, Russian professional mixed martial artist
- 19 October – Markiyan Kamysh, Ukrainian novelist
- 10 November – Natalia Pereverzeva, Russian model
- 20 November – Liis Lindmaa, Estonian actress

== Deaths ==
- January 8 — Vyacheslav Aleksandrov, Guards Junior Sergeant and squad commander in the 9th airborne company (b. 1968)
- January 14
  - Georgy Malenkov, 5th Premier of the Soviet Union (b. 1902)
  - Vladimir Lavrinenkov, fighter pilot (b. 1919)
- January 19 — Yevgeny Mravinsky, conductor, pianist and music pedagogue (b. 1903)
- January 25 — Boris Kulagin, ice hockey player and coach (b. 1924)
- February 12 — Bukhuti Zakariadze, actor (b. 1913)
- February 17
  - Alexander Bashlachev, singer-songwriter (b. 1960)
  - Yuri Ovchinnikov, chemist (b. 1934)
- February 23 — Joseph Karakis, architect (b. 1902)
- February 24 — Bluma Zeigarnik, psychologist (b. 1900)
- March 8 — África de las Heras, Spanish-born communist, naturalized Soviet citizen and secret service agent (b. 1909)
- March 15
  - Ivan Dubasov, artist (b. 1897)
  - Dmitri Polyakov, major general in the GRU and spy for the United States (b. 1921)
- April 6 — Gunārs Astra, human rights activist and anti-Soviet dissident (b. 1931)
- April 16 — Youri Egorov, classical pianist (b. 1954)
- April 17 — Isaak Yaglom, mathematician and author (b. 1921)
- April 27 — Valery Legasov, inorganic chemist and a member of the Academy of Sciences of the Soviet Union (b. 1936)
- May 2 — Pavel Kadochnikov, actor (b. 1915)
- May 3 — Lev Pontryagin, mathematician (b. 1908)
- May 4 — Oleg Zhakov, film actor (b. 1905)
- May 11 — Kim Philby, British intelligence officer android double agent for the Soviet Union (b. 1912)
- May 13
  - Sergey Gorshkov, Admiral of the Fleet (b. 1910)
  - Nikolay Makarov, firearms designer notable for Makarov pistol (b. 1914)
- May 16 — Anatoli Maslyonkin, footballer (b. 1930)
- May 24 — Aleksei Losev, philosopher (b. 1893)
- May 31 — Tursun Uljabayev, 7th First Secretary of the Communist Party of Tajikistan (b. 1916)
- June 2 — Iosif Grigulevich, secret police operative (b. 1913)
- June 3 — Alexandre Bennigsen, scholar of Islam (b. 1913)
- June 18 — Iasyr Shivaza, poet and writer (b. 1906)
- June 19 — Aaly Tokombaev, poet, composer and novelist (b. 1904)
- June 29 — Alexander Gorkin, 5th Chairman of the Supreme Court of the Soviet Union (b. 1897)
- August 6 — Anatoly Levchenko, Soviet cosmonaut in the Buran programme (b. 1941)
- August 30 — Nikolai Fefilov, serial killer (b. 1946)
- August 31
  - Vasil Mzhavanadze, 13th First Secretary of the Georgian Communist Party (b. 1902)
  - Edgar Elbakyan, Armenian actor (b. 1928)
- September 17 — Roman Davydov, animation director (b. 1913)
- September 26 — Sergey Shcherbakov, serial killer and rapist (b. 1962)
- October 1 — Anatoly Blatov, diplomat (b. 1914)
- October 15 — Khudu Mammadov, geologist (b. 1927)
- November 2 — Hokuma Gurbanova, stage and film actress (b. 1913)
- November 28 — Leonid Lubennikov, 4th First Secretary of the Communist Party of the Karelo-Finnish Soviet Socialist Republic (b. 1910)
- November 29 — Yevsey Moiseyenko, painter and pedagogue (b. 1916)
- December 13 — Fyodor Reshetnikov, painter (b. 1906)
- December 25 — Evgeny Golubev, composer (b. 1910)
- December 29 — Rita Rait-Kovaleva, literary translator and writer (b. 1898)
- December 30
  - Yuli Daniel, writer and dissident (b. 1925)
  - Nikolai Sologubov, ice hockey denfenceman (b. 1924)

== Unknown dates ==
- Little Vera premieres in the Soviet Union.
- Many higher education institutes cancel military training departments, which helped students to avoid military draft.

== See also ==
- 1988 in fine arts of the Soviet Union
- List of Soviet films of 1980-91
