= 1986 in the Soviet Union =

- Decades: 1960s; 1970s; 1980s; 1990s
- See also: History of the Soviet Union; List of years in the Soviet Union

The following lists events that happened during 1986 in the Union of Soviet Socialist Republics.

== Incumbents ==
- General Secretary of the Communist Party of the Soviet Union – Mikhail Gorbachev
- Chairman of the Presidium of the Supreme Soviet – Andrei Gromyko
- Premier of the Soviet Union – Nikolai Ryzhkov
- Chairman of the Supreme Court of the Soviet Union – Vladimir Terebilov

== Events ==
=== January ===
- 25 January – Mikhail Gorbachev proposes a 15-year plan on abolition of nuclear weapons.

=== February ===
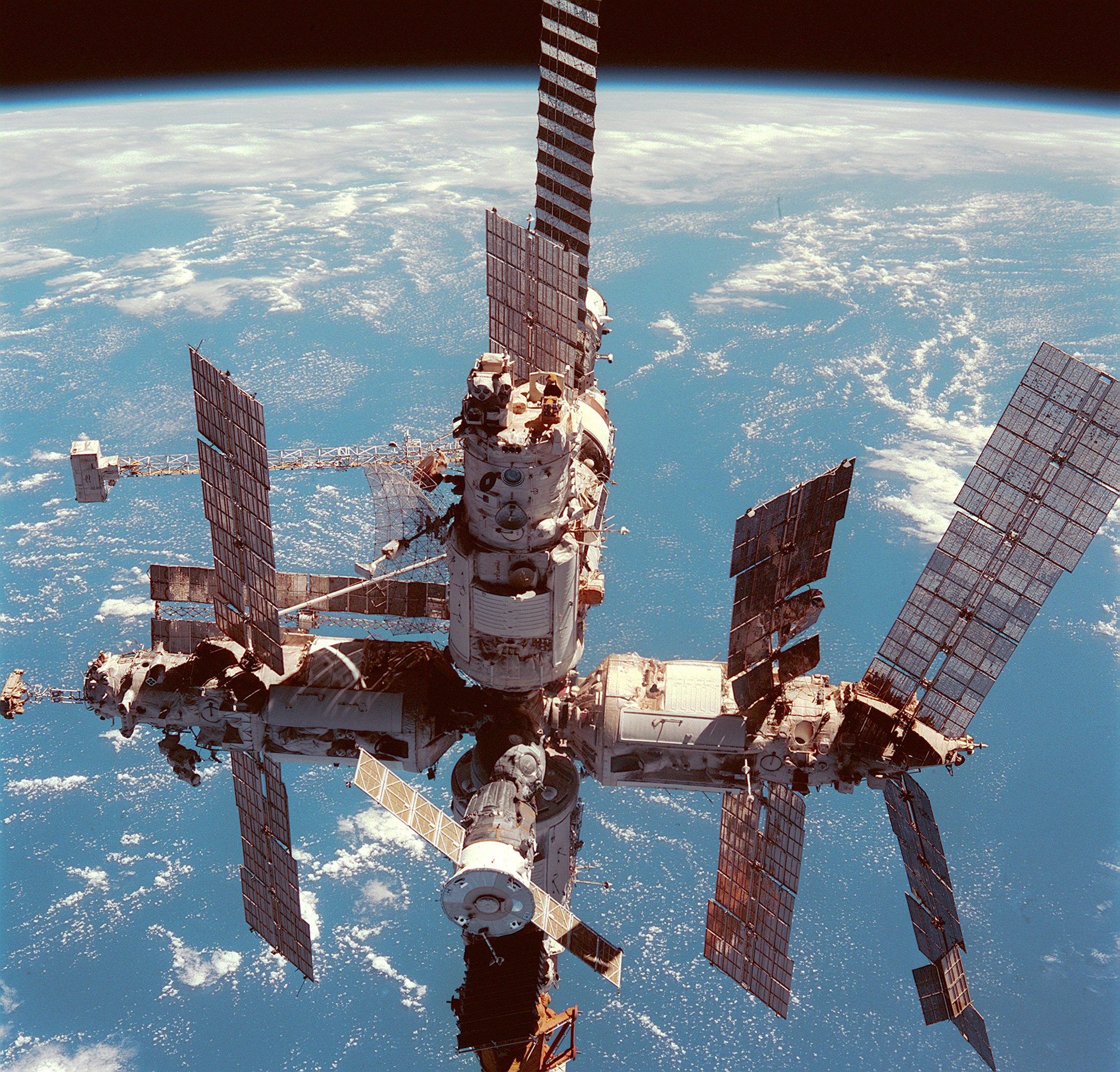
Mir

- 20 February – The first component of the Mir space station - the core module - is launched.
- 24 February – VI Winter Spartakiad of the Peoples of the USSR opens in Krasnoyarsk.
- 25 February – The 27th Congress of the Communist Party of the Soviet Union is opened, where the concept of glasnost emerges.

=== March ===
- 1 March – 1986 Soviet Top League is inaugurated.
- 13 March
  - Soyuz T-15 is launched at the Gagarin's Start.
  - 1986 Black Sea incident: American cruiser USS Yorktown and the destroyer USS Caron, claiming the right of innocent passage, enter the Soviet territorial waters near the southern Crimean Peninsula.

=== April ===
- 12 April – 1986 World Ice Hockey Championships are inaugurated in Moscow.
- 21 April - Mikhail Gorbachev announces that the Soviet Union is ready to dissolve the Warsaw Pact with the simultaneous dissolution of NATO.
- 26 April – Chernobyl disaster.

=== May ===
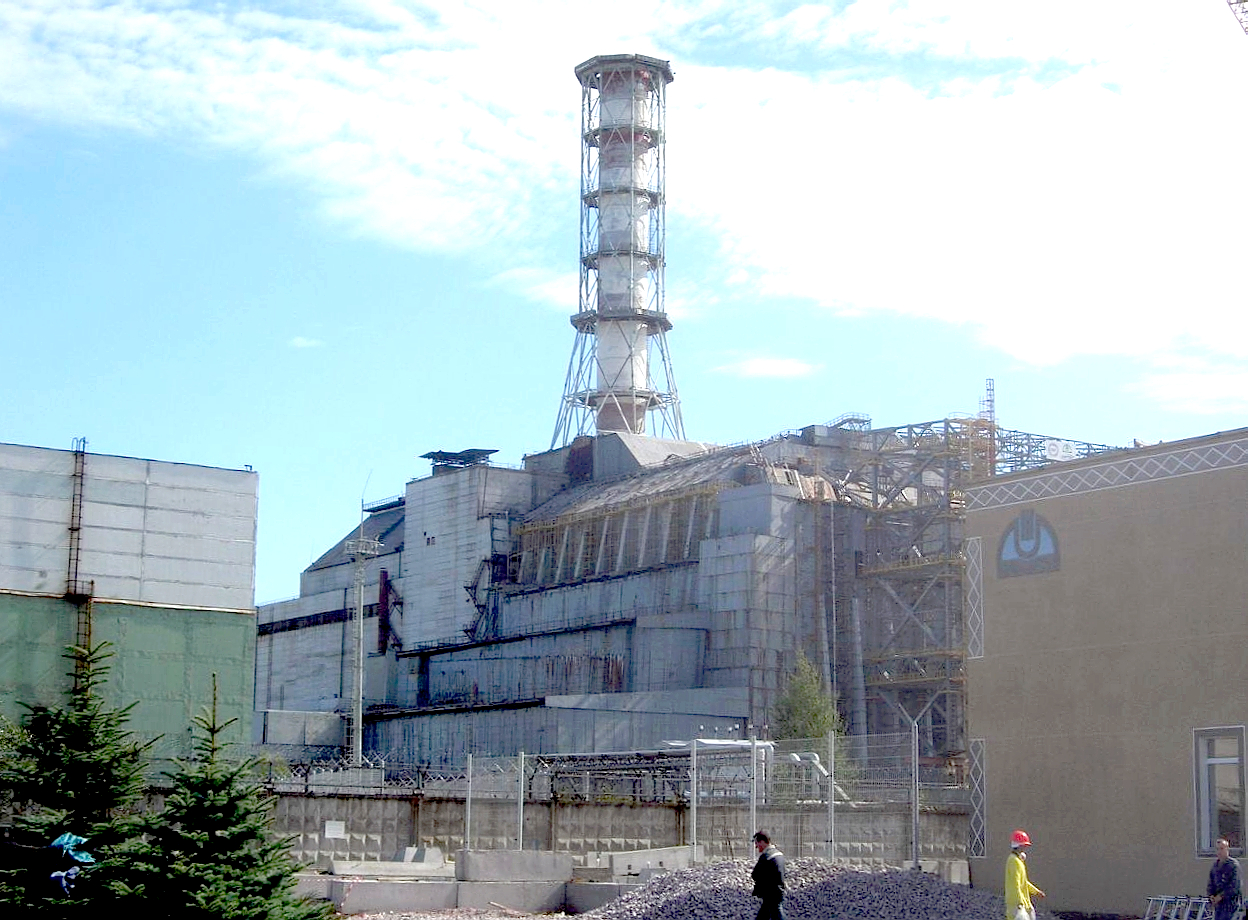
Chernobyl Nuclear Power Plant sarcophagus

- 4 May – Rock-Panorama-86 festival opens in Moscow.
- 12 May – The Council of Ministers of the USSR introduces the State Acceptance of Production (gospriyomka).
- 13 May – The 5th congress of the Union of Cinematographers of the USSR is opened.
- 20 May – The designing of Chernobyl Nuclear Power Plant sarcophagus starts.

=== June ===
- 3 June – IX Summer Spartakiad of the Peoples of the USSR opens.
- 28 June – Antonov An-12 of the Soviet Air Forces crashes in Yeysk, killing 10.

=== July ===
- 2 July – Aeroflot Flight 2306 crashes in Komi ASSR, killing 54.
- 5 July – 1986 Goodwill Games are inaugurated in Moscow.

=== August ===
- 8 August – 1986 FIBA World Championship for Women opens in Minsk, Vilnius and Moscow.
- 31 August – Sinking of SS Admiral Nakhimov in the Black Sea, 423 deaths.

=== September ===
- 5 September – The Soviet leg of the World Chess Championship 1986 opens in Leningrad.
- 20 September – Two Internal Troops servicemen make an unsuccessful attempt to hijack Tu-134A aircraft in Ufa and flee to Pakistan.

=== October ===
- 5 October – Scientist and human rights advocate Yuri Orlov is freed from Siberian exile.
- 20 October – Aeroflot Flight 6502 crashes in Kuybyshev (now Samara), killing 70.

=== November ===
- 6 November – Koristovka train collision, 44 are dead and about 100 are injured.
- 14 November – The Molodezhny department store in Moscow is robbed, 3 cash-in-transit workers are killed.
- 19 November – The law "On Individual Labor Activity" is adopted, approving the use of private enterprises to manufacture some consumer goods.
- 19 November – The Supreme Soviet of the Soviet Union issues an Appeal to Parliaments and People of the World about global nuclear disarmament.

=== December ===
- 1 December – Popular film Kin-dza-dza! is released.
- 16 December – Jeltoqsan riots spark in Alma-Ata.
- 19 December – Soviet authorities announce that Andrei Sakharov and Yelena Bonner now can return to Moscow after a seven-year exile.

== Births ==
=== January ===
- 1 January – Victoria Amelina, Ukrainian novelist (d. 2023)
- 4 January – Andrei Krauchanka, Belarusian decathlete
- 5 January – Yana Shemyakina, Ukrainian Olympic champion in fencing
- 6 January
  - Yuliya Chermoshanskaya, Russian Olympic 4x100 metre relay champion
  - Irina Shayk, model and television personality
- 15 January – Mariya Abakumova, Russian javelin thrower

=== March ===
- 17 March – Olesya Rulin, Russian American actress

=== April ===
- 8 April – Igor Akinfeev, Russian goalkeeper
- 11 April – Tatiana Kosintseva, Russian chess Grandmaster
- 27 April – Dinara Safina, Russian tennis player

=== May ===
- 13 May – Alexander Rybak, Norwegian singer

=== June ===
- 12 June – Stanislava Komarova, Russian swimmer

=== July ===
- 22 July - Olha Bura, Ukrainian activist
- 31 July – Evgeni Malkin, Russian ice hockey player

=== September ===
- 3 September – Valdas Vasylius, Lithuanian basketball player
- 9 September – Katy Topuria, Georgian singer

=== October ===
- 16 October – Igor Mangushev, Russian mercenary leader (died 2023)
- 21 October – Tamerlan Tsarnaev, Chechen terrorist (died 2013)

=== November ===
- 6 November – Viktor Pylypenko, Ukrainian serviceman and LGBTQ+ rights activist

== Deaths ==
- January 11 – Ilya Averbakh, Soviet film director (b. 1934)
- January 30 – Ivan Papanin, Soviet Polar explorer and twice Hero of the Soviet Union (b. 1894)
- February 4 – Jānis Kalnbērziņš, 1st First Secretary of the Communist Party of Latvia (b. 1893)
- March 23
  - Anastasia Zuyeva, actress (b. 1896)
  - Lev Smirnov, 6th Chairman of the Supreme Court of the Soviet Union (b. 1911)
- April 7 – Leonid Kantorovich, economist and Nobel Prize laureate (b. 1912)
- April 12 – Valentin Kataev, Soviet writer (b. 1897)
- April 20 – Aleksei Arbuzov, playwright (b. 1908)
- April 26– Valery Khodemchuk, Soviet engineer, working at Chernobyl reactor 4 (b. 1951)
- May 6 – Sergei Simonov, Soviet weapons designer (b. 1894)
- May 11
  - Vladimir Pravik, Soviet firefighter (b. 1962)
  - Aleksandr Akimov, Soviet engineer who was the shift supervisor during the events of the Chernobyl disaster (b. 1953)
- May 13 – Vasily Ignatenko, Soviet firefighter who responded to the Chernobyl disaster (b. 1961)
- May 26 – Vitaly Abalakov, Soviet alpinist (b. 1906)
- July 7 – Ivan Zhevago, Soviet theater and film actor (b. 1912)
- August 22 – Vali Akhundov, 11th First Secretary of the Azerbaijan Communist Party (b. 1916)
- August 23 – Mikhail Kuznetsov, Soviet actor (b. 1918)
- September 25 – Nikolay Semyonov, Russian chemist, Nobel Prize laureate (b. 1896)
- November 8– Vyacheslav Molotov, Soviet politician and diplomat (b. 1890)
- December 8 – Anatoly Marchenko, Soviet dissident and author (b. 1938)
- December 15 – Serge Lifar, Soviet dancer and choreographer (b. 1905)
- December 29 – Andrei Tarkovsky, Russian filmmaker, writer, and film theorist (b. 1932)

== See also ==
- 1986 in fine arts of the Soviet Union
- List of Soviet films of 1980-91
