= List of mass graves from Soviet mass executions =

Graves of executed Soviet citizens and foreigners

In July 2010, a mass grave was discovered next to the Peter and Paul Fortress in St. Petersburg, containing the corpses of 80 military officers executed during the Red Terror of 1918–1921. By 2013 a total of 156 bodies had been found in the same location. At about the same time a mass grave from the Stalin period was discovered at the other end of the country in Vladivostok.

These and later mass graves in the Soviet Union were used to conceal the large numbers of Soviet citizens and foreigners executed by the Bolshevik regime under Vladimir Lenin and Joseph Stalin. Indiscriminate mass killings began in January 1918 during the Russian Civil War (1918–1922) as the Bolsheviks launched their Red Terror. After the upheavals of the First Five-Year Plan (1928–1932) the killings reached a peak in the Great Purge of 1937–1938. Also, the Soviet mass graves may be related to population transfer in the Soviet Union, Soviet anti-religious legislation, and others. At all times they were directed and carried out by the Soviet secret police under its changing titles: the Cheka during the Civil War, the OGPU during forced collectivisation of agriculture, and the NKVD during the Great Purge.

== During the Great Purge (1937–1938) ==
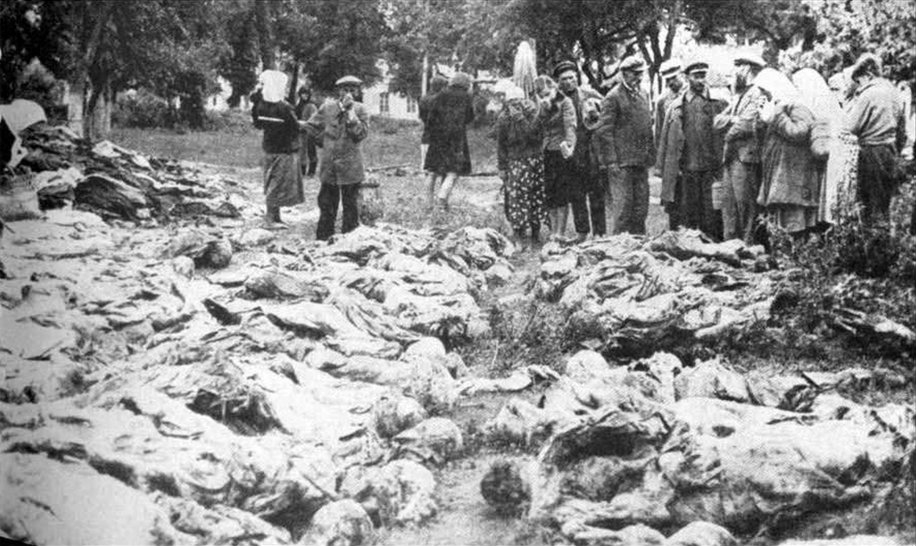
People of Vinnytsia searching for relatives among the victims of the Vinnytsia massacre exhumed from a mass grave in 1943.

In the final years of the USSR and after its dissolution in 1991, killing fields and burial sites were uncovered and memorialised across the countries of the former Soviet Union. Some dated back to the Red Terror or to the intervening years when the secret police in all major Soviet cities regularly used unmarked graves in existing cemeteries to dispose of those they executed or killed during interrogation. Most came into existence during the Great Purge.

Between 5 August 1937 and 17 November 1938 the scale of killing reached its apogee. In a series of 12 national operations the NKVD executed at least 680,000 men and women. That is the documented total: the real figure is almost certainly higher. In preparation for mass murder on such a scale the NKVD People's Commissar Yezhov instructed his subordinates throughout the Soviet Union to identify areas not far from the major urban centres where thousands of bodies could be quickly concealed. This was described by the late Arseny Roginsky

“In July that year NKVD departments across the USSR had already begun to set aside special ‘zones’, areas for the mass burial of those they shot. For locals these usually became known, euphemistically, as army firing ranges. This was how the zones that we know today came into being: the Levashovo Wasteland near Leningrad, Kuropaty near Minsk, the Golden Hill near Chelyabinsk, Bykovnya on the outskirts of Kiev, and many others.”

The widespread description of these sites as "firing ranges" has led to confusion between killing fields where the victims were both shot and buried, e.g. Sandarmokh, and the many other sites where those being buried and concealed had already been executed elsewhere.

=== Ukraine ===
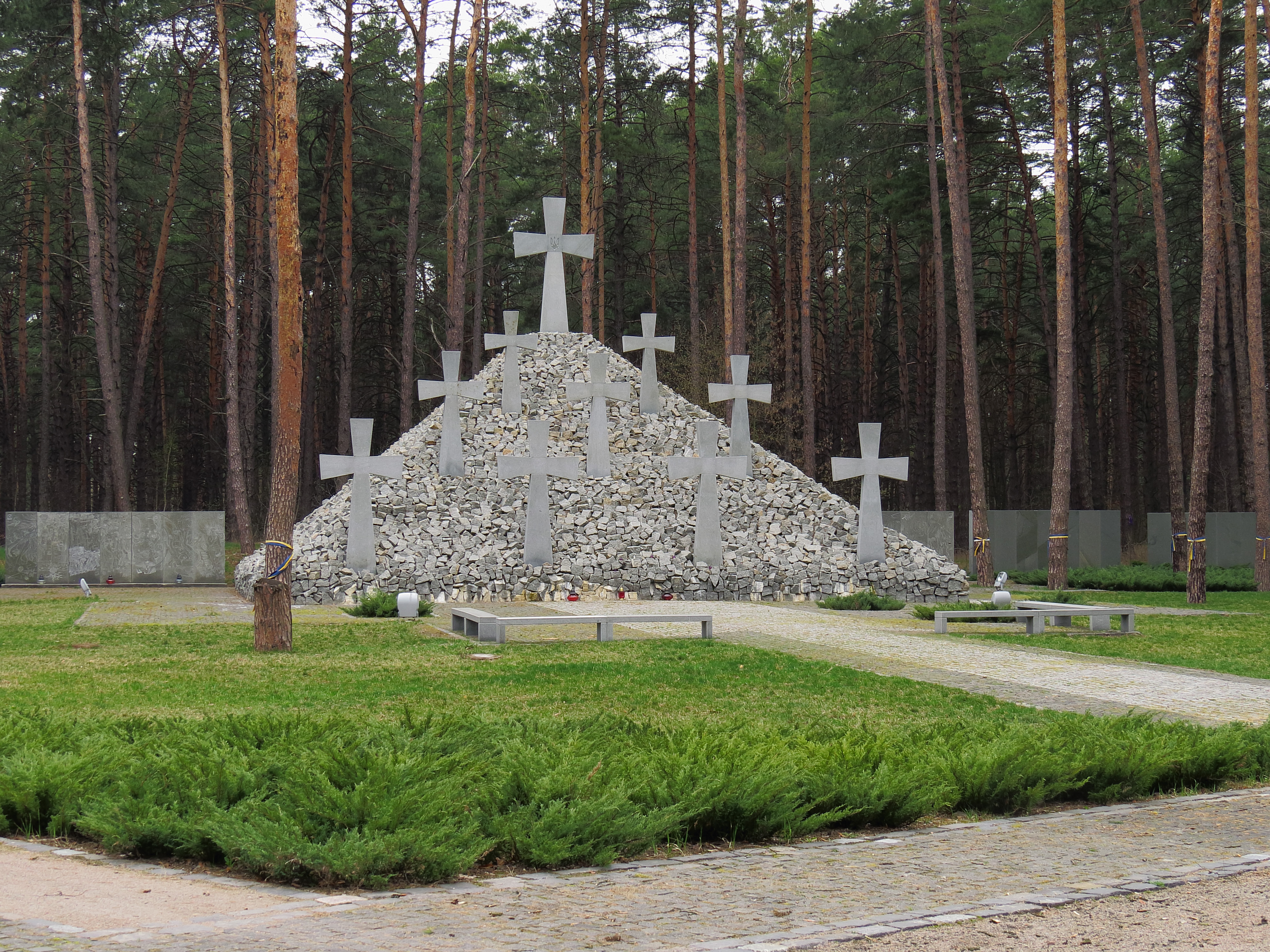
Bykivnia Graves site near Kyiv, Ukraine

- Bykivnia Graves near Kyiv contain an estimated 30,000.
- There are other mass graves in Uman, Bila Tserkva, Cherkasy and Zhytomyr.
- 9,432 corpses were exhumed following the Vinnytsia massacre.
- As in Russia and elsewhere, these sites keep appearing, e.g. a mass grave found in 2002 under the floor of a Ukrainian monastery.
- Tatarka common graves

=== Belarus ===
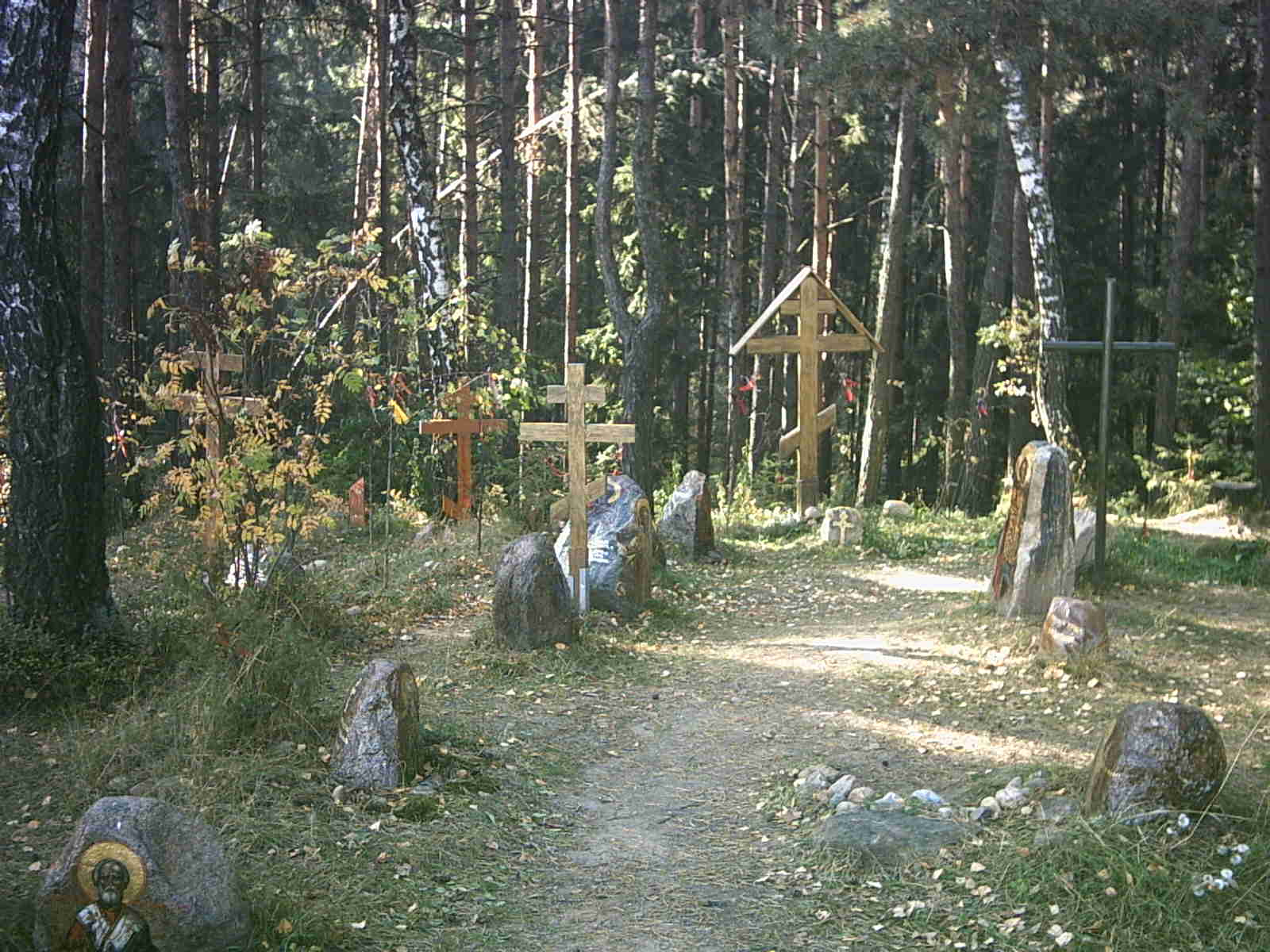
A mass grave site in Kurapaty near Minsk, Belarus

- Kurapaty – At least 50,000 are thought to have been shot at this site near Minsk, with considerably higher estimates in the Soviet press.

=== Russian Federation ===
Northwest Russia

- Krasny Bor Forest, Karelia
- Levashovo Memorial Cemetery in St Petersburg: 19,520 are thought to lie buried there.
- Toksovo, near Saint Petersburg was discovered in 2002. It, perhaps, contains up to 30,000 bodies.
- Sandarmokh (Karelia), was discovered in July 1997. At least 6,067 victims lie there, half of all those shot in Karelia during the Great Terror.

In or near Moscow

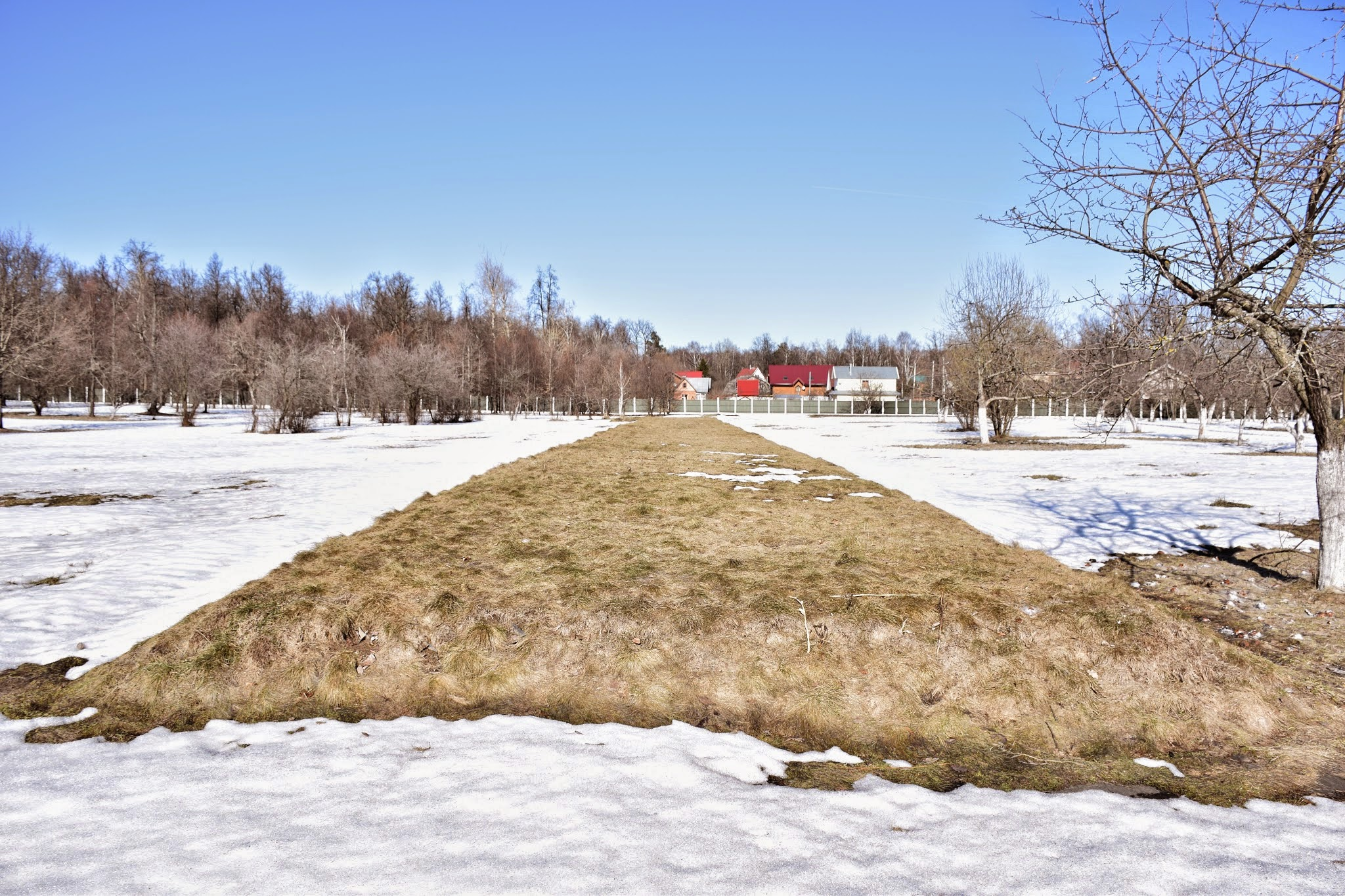
Mound covering one of the mass graves of Butovo firing range

- The Butovo firing range. The names of 20,702 victims are etched on the granite walls of the symbolic execution trenches in the Garden of Remembrance (opened September 2017).
- Donskoye Cemetery, the location of a secret crematorium and three secret mass graves, each consisting of tens of thousands of sets of ashes.
- Kommunarka. At its October 2018 opening 6,609 names were displayed on the Wall of Remembrance.

Siberia

- External image
  - Photo of the river shore, May 1979
  Kolpashevsky Yar in Kolpashevo (Tomsk Region, west Siberia). Over 1,000 bodies discovered in 1979, were then disposed of on the instructions of the local Party chief. Up to 4,000 people were shot in Kolpashevo, Tomsk Memorial estimates today.
- Pivovarikha (Irkutsk Region, east Siberia) near Irkutsk. A memorial area was established at Pivovarikha in 1989 but no accurate estimate has been made of the numbers buried there. The Memorial online database lists 10,609 who were shot throughout the Irkutsk Region during the Great Terror. The Open List database names 1,384 who were then shot in the city of Irkutsk.

== 1940 onwards ==
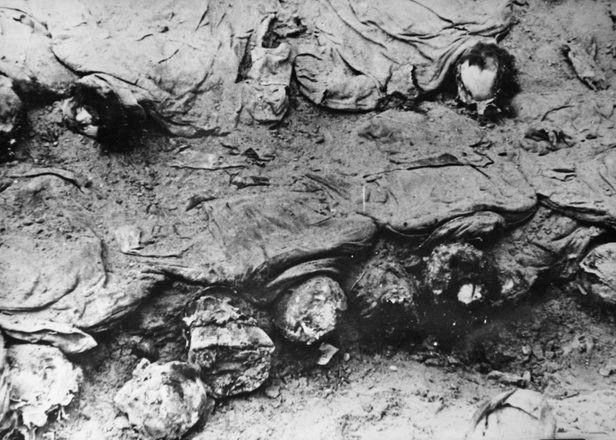
A 1943 photo by Polish Red Cross showing an exhumed mass grave with victims of the Katyn massacre

The Katyn massacre in Russia. With Stalin's approval, NKVD commissar Lavrenty Beria issued orders to shoot 25,700 Polish "nationalists and counter-revolutionaries", Poles held captive in a number of internment camps in western Russia, on date. The executions are collectively known as the Katyn massacre but they took place in three distinct locations: Katyn (Smolensk Region), Tver in central Russia and Kharkiv in eastern Ukraine.

At Katyn (Smolensk Region) at a site used earlier for executing hundreds of Soviet citizens. Polish POWs were shot there by the NKVD in April and May 1940. 4,413 bodies were later exhumed and identified. Polish prisoners were also shot at Kharkiv in eastern Ukraine and in Tver, then known as Kalinin. Some of them were buried at Mednoe, today a commemorative site in the Tver Region, having first been shot in Tver.

- Dem'ianiv Laz near Ivano-Frankovsk in modern Ukraine. After the Soviet occupation of the territory in 1939 at least 524 men, women and children were shot by the NKVD.

== See also ==
- NKVD prisoner massacres
- List of massacres in the Soviet Union
- Remembrance Day for the Victims of Political Repression
- Sandarmokh (Karelia). Execution & burial site.
- Stalinist repressions in Mongolia
