= Afinogenov =

Afinogenov is a Russian surname. Notable people with the surname include:

- Inna Afinogenova (born 1989), a Russian journalist
- Alexander Afinogenov (1904–1941), a Russian playwright
- Denis Afinogenov (born 1974), a Russian ice hockey player
  - Ekaterina Afinogenova (born 1987), a Russian tennis player, sister of Maxim
  - Maxim Afinogenov (born 1979), a Russian ice hockey player, brother of Ekaterina
