= Andryushchenko =

Andryushchenko (Russian or Ukrainian: Андрющенко) is a gender-neutral Slavic surname that may refer to

- Aleksandr Andryushchenko (born 1954), Russian football coach and former player
- Vladimir Andryushchenko (born 1982), Russian Paralympic athlete
- Vyacheslav Andryushchenko (born 1989), Belarusian ice hockey player

== See also ==
- Andrushchenko
