= Canal Red =

- Country: Spain
- Broadcast area: Spain
- Headquarters: Madrid

Programming
- Language: Spanish
- Picture format: 1080i (16:9 HDTV)

History
- Launched: 6 March 2023

Links
- Website: https://canalred.tv/

Canal RED is a Spanish free-to-air television channel founded by Pablo Iglesias Turrión which was launched on 6 March 2023. The channel is funded through crowdfunding.

== History ==
In May 2021, Pablo Iglesias retired from politics after the 2021 Madrid regional election (in which he led the Podemos-IU list) delivered a resounding right-wing majority. As a result of his withdrawal, Iglesias returned to dedicate himself mainly to the media especially through his broadcast program by the Iranian channel HispanTV.

In November 2022, Pablo Iglesias announced the start of a fundraising campaign for the launch of a leftist television channel, which would be called Canal Red, with the aim of competing with established channels that were considered conservative media by Iglesias and his followers. The project had the backing of Jaume Roures, owner of Mediapro.

The channel began its broadcasts through the internet on March 6, 2023. In April 2023, the channel began broadcasting free-to-air television in Madrid through the frequency that 7NN, a conservative television channel that closed due to financial problems a month earlier, had occupied.

The channel announced Inna Afinogenova as one of its first hires. Afinogenova is known in the Spanish-speaking world for having been one of the most visible faces of the Spanish version of RT, but she resigned from the channel after the Russian invasion of Ukraine. Despite that fact, some media continue to consider her and Canal Red close to the influence of the Kremlin.

== Programming ==
Canal Red's programming mainly consists of news and talk shows, as well as some cultural and entertainment content. The channel seeks to compete especially with La Sexta, a television channel considered far left by a part of the Spanish political spectrum, however, Iglesias and his followers consider this channel as a medium close to business groups.
