= 1988 in fine arts of the Soviet Union =

A Monument to Mitrofan Pyatnitsky
- Artist: Pack E., Dikunov I.
- Year: 1988
- Location: Prospekt of Revolution; Voronezh

The year 1988 was marked by many events that left an imprint on the history of Soviet and Russian Fine Arts.

== Events ==
- Exhibition of works by Dmitry Belajev was opened in the Leningrad Union of Artists.
- Exhibition of works by Margarita Piskareva was opened in the Leningrad Union of Artists.
- Exhibition of works by Vasily Savinsky (1859–1937) was opened in the Museum of the Academy of Arts in Leningrad
- September 17 — In Voronezh on Prospekt of Revolution was unveiled a monument to Mitrofan Pyatnitsky (1864—1927), Russian Soviet musician, actor and collector of Russian folk songs, the founder and a first artistic director of the Pyatnitsky Choir. Authors of the monument sculptor Pack E., architect Dikunov I.
- January 8 — Exhibition of works by Nikolai Galakhov was opened in the Leningrad Union of Artists.
- Exhibition of works by Evgenia Antipova was opened in the Leningrad Union of Artists.
- Exhibition of works by Vladimir Ovchinnikov (1911–1978) was opened in the Leningrad Union of Artists.
- Exhibition of works by Victor Teterin was opened in the Leningrad Union of Artists.

== Deaths ==
- January 1 — Anatoli Nenartovich (Russian: Ненартович Анатолий Акимович), Russian soviet painter (born 1915).
- March 13 — Vladimir Sakson (Russian: Саксон Владимир Станиславович), Russian soviet painter and theatre artist (born 1927).
- May 5 — Nina Suzdaleva (Russian: Суздалева Нина Владимировна), Russian soviet painter (born 1939).
- June 5 — Avenir Parkhomenko (Russian: Пархоменко Авенир Иванович), Russian soviet painter (born 1921).
- September 17 — Fiodor Smirnov, (Russian: Смирнов Фёдор Иванович), Russian soviet painter, Honored Artist of the Russian Federation (born 1923).
- October 12 — Boris Utekhin (Russian: Утехин Борис Константинович), Russian soviet painter (born 1910).
- October 20 — Vladimir Gorb (Russian: Горб Владимир Александрович), Russian soviet painter, graphic artist, and art educator, Honored Art worker of the Russian Federation (born 1903).
- November 29 — Evsey Moiseenko, (Russian: Моисеенко Евсей Евсеевич), Russian soviet painter, graphic artist, and art educator, People's Artist of the USSR (born 1916).
- December 8 — Alexandra Chestnokova (Russian: Чеснокова Александра Семёновна), Russian soviet painter (born 1908).
- December 13 — Fyodor Reshetnikov, (Russian: Решетников Фёдор Павлович), Russian soviet painter, People's Artist of the USSR (born 1906).

== See also ==
- List of Russian artists
- List of painters of Leningrad Union of Artists
- Saint Petersburg Union of Artists
- Russian culture
- 1988 in the Soviet Union

== Sources ==
- Савинский Василий Евмениевич (1859-1937). Путь к мастерству. Выставка произведений из фондов НИМ АХ СССР и собрания Т. В. Савинской. Каталог. Л., 1988.
- Антипова Евгения Петровна. Выставка произведений. Каталог. Л., Художник РСФСР, 1987.
- Владимир Иванович Овчинников. Выставка произведений. Каталог. Л., Художник РСФСР, 1984.
- Николай Николаевич Галахов. Выставка произведений. Каталог. Л., Художник РСФСР, 1987.
- Интерьер и натюрморт. Выставка произведений живописи художников Российской Федерации. Каталог. Л., Художник РСФСР, 1991.
- Беляев Дмитрий Васильевич. Выставка произведений. Каталог. Л., Художник РСФСР, 1988.
- Маргарита Алексеевна Пискарева. Выставка произведений. Каталог. Л., Художник РСФСР, 1988.
- Тетерин Виктор Кузьмич. Выставка произведений. Каталог. Л., Художник РСФСР, 1988.
- Artists of Peoples of the USSR. Biography Dictionary. Vol. 1. Moscow, Iskusstvo, 1970.
- Artists of Peoples of the USSR. Biography Dictionary. Vol. 2. Moscow, Iskusstvo, 1972.
- Directory of Members of Union of Artists of USSR. Volume 1,2. Moscow, Soviet Artist Edition, 1979.
- Directory of Members of the Leningrad branch of the Union of Artists of Russian Federation. Leningrad, Khudozhnik RSFSR, 1980.
- Artists of Peoples of the USSR. Biography Dictionary. Vol. 4 Book 1. Moscow, Iskusstvo, 1983.
- Directory of Members of the Leningrad branch of the Union of Artists of Russian Federation. - Leningrad: Khudozhnik RSFSR, 1987.
- Artists of peoples of the USSR. Biography Dictionary. Vol. 4 Book 2. - Saint Petersburg: Academic project humanitarian agency, 1995.
- Link of Times: 1932 - 1997. Artists - Members of Saint Petersburg Union of Artists of Russia. Exhibition catalogue. - Saint Petersburg: Manezh Central Exhibition Hall, 1997.
- Matthew C. Bown. Dictionary of 20th Century Russian and Soviet Painters 1900-1980s. - London: Izomar, 1998.
- Vern G. Swanson. Soviet Impressionism. - Woodbridge, England: Antique Collectors' Club, 2001.
- Время перемен. Искусство 1960—1985 в Советском Союзе. СПб., Государственный Русский музей, 2006.
- Sergei V. Ivanov. Unknown Socialist Realism. The Leningrad School. - Saint-Petersburg: NP-Print Edition, 2007. - ISBN 5-901724-21-6, ISBN 978-5-901724-21-7.
- Anniversary Directory graduates of Saint Petersburg State Academic Institute of Painting, Sculpture, and Architecture named after Ilya Repin, Russian Academy of Arts. 1915 - 2005. - Saint Petersburg: Pervotsvet Publishing House, 2007.
