= 1986 in fine arts of the Soviet Union =

The year 1986 was marked by many events that left an imprint on the history of Soviet and Russian Fine Arts.

== Events ==
- Exhibition of works by Elena Kostenko was opened in the Leningrad Union of Artists.
- Traditional Exhibition of works of Leningrad artists – the Great Patriotic War veterans was opened in the Leningrad Union of Artists on the eve of Victory Day (9 May).
- Exhibition of works by Boris Lavrenko was opened in the Museum of the Academy of Arts in Leningrad.
- Exhibition of works by Boris Shamanov was opened in the Leningrad Union of Artists.
- Exhibition of works by Yaroslav Nikolaev (1899–1978) was opened in the Leningrad Union of Artists.
- Exhibition of works by Piotr Fomin was opened in the «Manezh» Central Exhibition Hall in the Moscow.
- Exhibition of works by Piotr Buchkin (1886–1965) was opened in the Leningrad Union of Artists.
- Exhibition of works by Yaroslav Krestovsky was opened in the Central House of Artists in Moscow.

== Deaths ==
- February 12 — Elena Skuin (Russian: Скуинь Елена Петровна), Russian soviet painter and graphic artist (b. 1908).
- March 27 — Mikhail Poniatov (Russian: Понятов Михаил Осипович), Russian soviet painter (b. 1905).
- June 8 — Victor Tsiplakov, (Russian: Цыплаков Виктор Григорьевич), Russian soviet painter, People's Artist of the RSFSR (b. 1915).
- June 26 — Vadim Sidur (Russian: Сидур Вадим Абрамович), Russian soviet sculptor (b. 1924).
- August 2 — Vsevolod Bazhenov (Russian: Баженов, Всеволод Андреевич), Russian soviet painter (b. 1909).
- August 6 — Nikolai Mukho (Russian: Мухо Николай Антонович), Russian soviet painter (b. 1913).

== See also ==
- List of Russian artists
- List of painters of Leningrad Union of Artists
- Saint Petersburg Union of Artists
- Russian culture
- 1986 in the Soviet Union

== Sources ==
- Лавренко Борис Михайлович. Выставка произведений. Каталог. Л., Художник РСФСР, 1986.
- Борис Иванович Шаманов. Выставка произведений. Каталог. Л., Художник РСФСР, 1986.
- Хаустов Андрей Иванович (1930–1978). Выставка произведений. Каталог. Л., Художник РСФСР, 1986.
- Петр Дмитриевич Бучкин. Выставка произведений. Каталог. Л., Художник РСФСР, 1986.
- Михаил Петрович Железнов. Выставка произведений. Каталог. Л., Художник РСФСР, 1986.
- Мы побратимы – сохраним мир. Третья совместная выставка произведений художников Ленинграда и Дрездена. Дрезден, 1986.
- Ярослав Крестовский. Каталог выставки. М., Советский художник, 1986.
- Ярослав Сергеевич Николаев. Сборник материалов и каталог выставки произведений. Л., Художник РСФСР, 1986.
- Елена Михайловна Костенко. Каталог выставки.. Л., Художник РСФСР, 1986.
- Романычев Александр Дмитриевич. Выставка произведений. Каталог. Л., Художник РСФСР, 1986.
- Artists of Peoples of the USSR. Biography Dictionary. Vol. 1. Moscow, Iskusstvo, 1970.
- Artists of Peoples of the USSR. Biography Dictionary. Vol. 2. Moscow, Iskusstvo, 1972.
- Directory of Members of Union of Artists of USSR. Volume 1,2. Moscow, Soviet Artist Edition, 1979.
- Directory of Members of the Leningrad branch of the Union of Artists of Russian Federation. Leningrad, Khudozhnik RSFSR, 1980.
- Artists of Peoples of the USSR. Biography Dictionary. Vol. 4 Book 1. Moscow, Iskusstvo, 1983.
- Directory of Members of the Leningrad branch of the Union of Artists of Russian Federation. – Leningrad: Khudozhnik RSFSR, 1987.
- Artists of peoples of the USSR. Biography Dictionary. Vol. 4 Book 2. – Saint Petersburg: Academic project humanitarian agency, 1995.
- Link of Times: 1932 – 1997. Artists – Members of Saint Petersburg Union of Artists of Russia. Exhibition catalogue. – Saint Petersburg: Manezh Central Exhibition Hall, 1997.
- Matthew C. Bown. Dictionary of 20th Century Russian and Soviet Painters 1900-1980s. – London: Izomar, 1998.
- Vern G. Swanson. Soviet Impressionism. – Woodbridge, England: Antique Collectors' Club, 2001.
- Петр Фомин. Живопись. Воспоминания современников. СПб., 2002. С.107.
- Время перемен. Искусство 1960—1985 в Советском Союзе. СПб., Государственный Русский музей, 2006.
- Sergei V. Ivanov. Unknown Socialist Realism. The Leningrad School. – Saint-Petersburg: NP-Print Edition, 2007. – ISBN 5-901724-21-6, ISBN 978-5-901724-21-7.
- Anniversary Directory graduates of Saint Petersburg State Academic Institute of Painting, Sculpture, and Architecture named after Ilya Repin, Russian Academy of Arts. 1915 – 2005. – Saint Petersburg: Pervotsvet Publishing House, 2007.
