= Andrushchenko =

Andrushchenko (Ukrainian: Андрущенко) is a Ukrainian surname. Notable people with the surname include:

- Maksym Andrushchenko (born 1999), Ukrainian footballer
- Nikolay Andrushchenko (1943–2017), Russian journalist
- Viktor Andrushchenko (born 1986), Ukrainian ice hockey player

== See also ==
- Andryushchenko
