= Yegor Ligachev =

Soviet and Russian politician (1920–2021)

- Егор Лигачёв
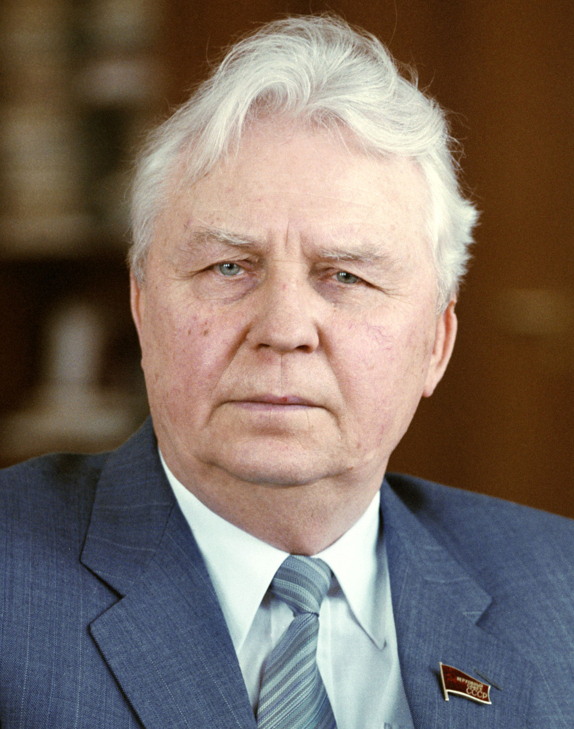
- Ligachev in 1988

Second Secretary of the Communist Party of the Soviet Union
- In office 10 March 1985 – 14 July 1990
- Preceded by: Mikhail Gorbachev
- Succeeded by: Vladimir Ivashko (as Deputy General Secretary)

Head of the Organizational-Party Work Department of the Central Committee
- In office 29 April 1983 – 23 April 1985
- Preceded by: Ivan Kapitonov
- Succeeded by: Georgy Razumovsky

First Secretary of the Tomsk Regional Committee
- In office 26 November 1965 – 29 April 1983
- Preceded by: Ivan Tikhonovich Marchenko
- Succeeded by: Alexander Melnikov
Additional positions
Full member of the 26th, 27th Politburo
In office
23 April 1985 – 14 July 1990
Member of the 26th, 27th Secretariat
In office
26 December 1983 – 14 July 1990
Member of the 26th, 27th Central Committee
In office
3 March 1981 – 14 July 1990

Personal details
- Born: 29 November 1920 Dubinkino, Kainsky district, Tomsk Governorate, Russian SFSR
- Died: 7 May 2021 (aged 100) Moscow, Russia
- Resting place: Troyekurovskoye Cemetery, Moscow
- Party: Communist Party of the Soviet Union (1944–1991); Communist Party of the Russian Federation (1993–2021)
- Children: Alexander Ligachev (born 1947)

Yegor Kuzmich Ligachev (also transliterated as Ligachyov; Russian: Егор Кузьмич Лигачёв; 29 November 1920 – 7 May 2021) was a Soviet and Russian politician who was a high-ranking official in the Communist Party of the Soviet Union (CPSU), and who continued an active political career in post-Soviet Russia. Originally an ally of Mikhail Gorbachev, Ligachev became a challenger to his leadership.

== Early life ==
Ligachev was born on 29 November 1920 in the village of Dubinkino in the Kainsky district of the Tomsk province (in the present-day Chulymsky District of the Novosibirsk Oblast). Between 1938 and 1943 he attended the Ordzhonikidze Institute for Aviation in Moscow and attained a technical engineering degree. Ligachev joined the Communist Party at the age of 24 in 1944, later studying at the Central Committee Higher Party School in Moscow in 1951.

== Political career ==
Ligachev's career began in his native Siberia and took him to some of the highest functions of the Party. He was often regarded as Gorbachev's second man, holding important posts such as the Secretary for Ideology. He initially served under Yuri Andropov and later Gorbachev himself. However, Ligachev lost his posts in 1990, a year before the dissolution of the Soviet Union, resigning from his political career at the 28th Party Congress. Ligachev was critical of Boris Yeltsin and Gorbachev to an extent, although he is often portrayed as having been Gorbachev's primary critic.

=== In the USSR ===
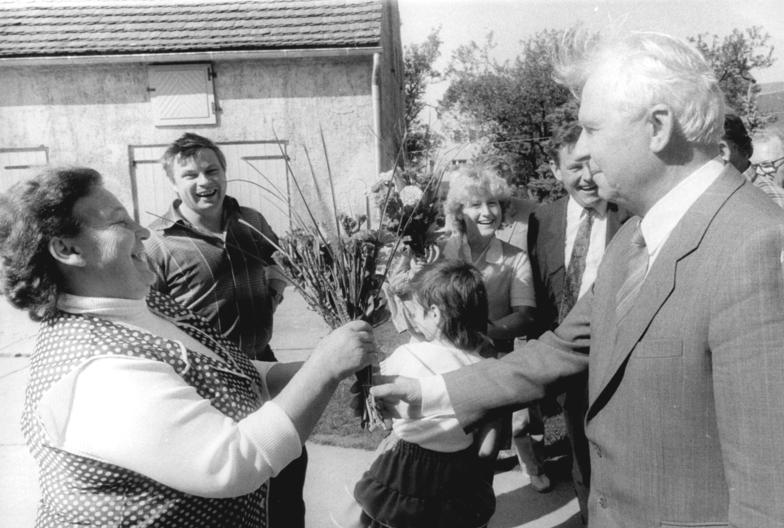
Ligachev (right) meets with German farmers in Neuzelle during a visit to East Germany in 1989.

Ligachev was First Secretary of the Novosibirsk Komsomol, before becoming Deputy Chairman of the Novosibirsk Soviet, and then Secretary of the Novosibirsk Obkom between 1959 and 1961.

Ligachev gained his first major post in 1961, when he began working in the Central Committee of the CPSU. In 1965, he became First Secretary of the Party in Tomsk, Siberia. He was reputed to be an effective administrator. In a memoir published in 1984, Nikolai Baibakov, the chairman of the USSR State Planning Committee, praised Ligachev for introducing "modern management methods" in Tomsk, and for his "tremendous contribution to all branches of the region's economy". During his time there he led the cover-up of the Stalin-era mass grave at Kolpashevo. He was to hold this position until 1983, when he was discovered by Yuri Andropov and made head of the Party Organization Department and a Secretary of the Central Committee.

In 1966, Ligachev was elected a candidate member of the Central Committee, and ten years later in 1976 he was promoted to a full member. When Mikhail Gorbachev became General Secretary in 1985, Ligachev was promoted to become a Secretary of higher status, and was generally viewed as one of Gorbachev's primary allies: he had helped organize a pro-Gorbachev faction in hope of having Gorbachev succeed Andropov in 1984, although this attempt failed (instead, Konstantin Chernenko was chosen as a stop-gap candidate). Ligachev was made head of the Secretariat.

Ligachev supported reform of the Soviet Union and initially supported Gorbachev; however, as Gorbachev's policies of perestroika and glasnost began to resemble what were seen as social democratic policies, he distanced himself from Gorbachev, and by 1988 he was recognized as the leader of the more conservative, anti-Gorbachev faction of Soviet politicians. During this period, Ligachev began to utter the phrase "Boris, you are wrong" when referring to Yeltsin in a political discourse. Ligachev served in the Politburo between 1985 and 1990. Ligachev, having made some speeches criticizing Gorbachev, was demoted from his more prestigious position as Secretary for Ideology to Secretary for Agriculture on 30 September 1988.

At the 28th Congress of the CPSU in 1990, he criticized Gorbachev for circumventing the Party via the Soviet Presidency, and he argued Glasnost had gone too far. During the Party Congress, Ligachev challenged Gorbachev for the office of General Secretary, standing as the "Leninist" candidate. Having been defeated, Ligachev left the Politburo for temporary retirement.

=== Russian Federation ===
After the Soviet Union collapsed in 1991, Ligachev became a communist politician in the Russian Federation. Ligachev was elected three times to the Russian State Duma as a member for the Communist Party of the Russian Federation. Ligachev was a member of its Central Committee from 1993 on. However, he lost his seat in the Duma in 2003, when he polled 23.5 percent of the vote against United Russia candidate Vladimir Zhidkikh's 53 percent.

Ligachev's memoirs, Inside Gorbachev's Kremlin, were published in 1996. Serge Schmemann of The New York Times wrote that the author was driven "to seek explanations for what went wrong, to understand his own role" and while the reviewer wished for more intrigue (in the form of detailed accounts of events other than the dissolution of the USSR), he believed the book was an interesting and detailed account of that period from the perspective of an "honest Bolshevik".

== Significance ==
Ligachev became one of Gorbachev's primary critics, and was accused of leading a conservative faction. Although publicly endorsing perestroika, Ligachev was opposed to Gorbachev's attempts to expand Soviet authority and limit the responsibilities of party officials. Ligachev did not support the decision to end the CPSU's monopoly of political power in 1990, nor did he support Gorbachev's response to the gradual withdrawal of Soviet authority in Eastern Europe. He saw the quick reunification of Germany as being an "impending danger".

However, in 1988, Ligachev denied that he was leading a conservative faction, saying that the Party leadership were united behind Gorbachev. He also rejected suggestions after the fall of the Soviet Union that he had been opposed to Gorbachev in his memoirs and in speeches. Ligachev clearly demonstrated conservative ideas in his opposition of Yeltsin's political ideas, on the other hand, opposing the principles of glasnost. He later repudiated his opposition to Gorbachev's policies, saying it was "only too late [he] discerned a social democrat in Gorbachev". However, Ligachev repeatedly denied he was opposed to Gorbachev in sources including his memoirs.

Ligachev's economically hard-line views were upheld in speeches he made to the CPSU's Congress in 1990. The following deplored privatization of the economy:

Public ownership unites, but private ownership disunites people's interests and indisputably causes social stratification of society.... For what purpose was perestroika started? For the purpose of most fully using the potential of socialism. Then does the sale of enterprises into private hands really promote the revealing of the possibilities inherent in the socialist system? No, it does not.... Lately people have begun saying, "Perestroika will develop, with the party or without it." I think otherwise. With the party, and only with the vanguard party, can we move forward on the way of socialist renewal. Without the party of Communists, perestroika is a lost cause....

However, in this speech he also rejected the idea he was a conservative, saying he was a realist. Ligachev also stated earlier that "the slackening of state discipline" was "among the reasons for the troubled state of the economy". Furthermore, together with KGB chief Viktor Chebrikov, Ligachev took several opportunities to warn against rapid reform before he was demoted to Secretary for Agriculture in 1988.

Although not mentioned in his memoirs to any notable extent, Ligachev played a significant role in dismissing Yeltsin, arguing with him for long periods of time in 1987. Ligachev opposed Yeltsin's idea that Party officials enjoyed greater privilege.

Ligachev was considered "Second Secretary" of the Central Committee (and thus the Soviet Union) for most of his time in the Politburo.

== Death ==
On 5 April 2021, he was hospitalized at the Moscow Central Clinical Hospital. A few days before his death, he was admitted to intensive care, where he was connected to a ventilator. He was diagnosed with bilateral pneumonia and multiple autonomic disorders according to the doctors; they assessed Ligachev’s condition as extremely serious because of his old age.

Ligachev died in his sleep from pneumonia, on 7 May 2021, at the age of 100. He was buried at the Troekurovskoye cemetery.

== Awards and honorary titles ==
Order of Lenin, twice (1970 & 1980)
Order of the October Revolution (1976)
Order of the Red Banner of Labour, twice (1948 & 1967)
Order of the Patriotic War, 1st class (23 April 1985)
Order of the Badge of Honour (1957)
Jubilee Medal "In Commemoration of the 100th Anniversary of the Birth of Vladimir Ilyich Lenin" (1970)
Medal "For Valiant Labour in the Great Patriotic War 1941–1945" (1945)
Medal "For the Development of Virgin Lands" (1957)
Jubilee Medal "75 Years of Victory in the Great Patriotic War 1941–1945" (2019)
Jubilee Medal "70 Years of Victory in the Great Patriotic War 1941–1945" (2013)
Jubilee Medal "65 Years of Victory in the Great Patriotic War 1941–1945" (2009)
Jubilee Medal "60 Years of Victory in the Great Patriotic War 1941–1945" (2004)
Jubilee Medal "50 Years of Victory in the Great Patriotic War 1941–1945" (1993)
Jubilee Medal "Forty Years of Victory in the Great Patriotic War 1941–1945" (1985)
Jubilee Medal "Thirty Years of Victory in the Great Patriotic War 1941–1945" (1975)
Anniversary medal "70 years of the Tomsk region"

=== Honorary titles ===
- Honorary title "Honorary Citizen of the Tomsk Region" (20 November 2000)
- Medal "For outstanding contribution to the development of Siberia" (2003)
- Order "Tomsk Glory" (20 May 2014)
- Honorary citizen of the city of Tomsk (27 November 2015)

== Bibliography ==
- Inside Gorbachev's Kremlin: The Memoirs of Yegor Ligachev. Pantheon Books: 1993 (ISBN 0-679-41392-8)
- Ligachev on Glasnost and Perestroika. Carl Beck Papers in Russian and East European Studies, no. 706: 1989.
