= Sergey Shcherbakov =

Soviet serial killer and rapist

- Born: Sergey Petrovich Shcherbakov; 1961–62; USSR
- Died: 26 September 1988; Kemerovo, Kemerovo Oblast, RSFSR
- Cause of death: Execution by shooting
- Other names: "The Handsome One" "Spider"
- Conviction: Murder
- Penalty: Death

Details
- Victims: 6
- Span of crimes: 7 May – 21 September 1985
- Country: Soviet Union
- State: Kemerovo

Sergey Petrovich Shcherbakov (Russian: Серге́й Петро́вич Щербако́в; 1961–62 – 26 September 1988) was a Soviet serial killer and rapist. In 1985, he killed 6 people: five women, one of whom was pregnant, and a teenage girl, all in Leninsk-Kuznetsky. He was eventually sentenced to death and executed for his crimes.

== Biography ==
=== Early years ===
The exact date and birthplace of Sergey Shcherbakov is unknown. In 1985, he was 23 years of age, and his mother worked at a factory. As a child, Shcherbakov was a quiet and inconspicuous boy. After graduating from the 8th grade at school, he entered a vocational school and was afterwards drafted into the army, where he stole ammunition. Shcherbakov was in love with a girl, but she decided not to wait for him to return from the army and instead married another man. Angered, Shcherbakov motivated his future murders with this.

When demobilized, Shcherbakov moved to the private sector of Leninsk-Kuzntesky, working as an underground electrician at the Yaroslavsky mine. He married a divorced pregnant woman named Irina, whose former husband was a prisoner. Shcherbakov, jealous of his wife's past, systematically beat and tortured her. Despite this, Irina gave birth to a child from her ex-husband. Annoyed, he eventually lost interest in Irina and began roaming the streets, beating passers-by and stealing hats. Shcherbakov's wife thought he had a mistress, and wanted to make a love spell so that her husband would lose interest in women.

=== Murders ===
Shcherbakov soon really lost sexual interest in surrounding women. In 1985, he committed a series of murders. The killer attacked the victims mainly in the dark, killing them with blows from a hammer (in one case, he also used a wire to strangle, in others he stabbed the victim, but she survived). Shcherbakov wore a hammer in his trouser pocket or carried it in a pram (in this case, the killer told his wife that he was transporting building materials for an extension of the house). He initially did not rape his victims, but then began doing it. In the mid-1980s, the Leninsk-Kuznetsky private sector was very poorly lit, which made it easier for the criminal to commit his attacks.

Shcherbakov committed the first murder on 7 May, in the area of School No. 10. The victim was 27-year-old pregnant woman Tatiana Berdyugina. She was in the pathology department of the local hospital for the preservation of her fetus but was released for the May holidays. At the murder scene, only a matchbox with a spot of blood was found. After the murder of Berdyugina, reinforced police patrols took the streets of Leninsk-Kuznetsky. Night raids were organized, with law enforcement officers acting as bait for the criminal.

A tailor's wife named Vera Chulyukova became Shcherbakov's second victim. The murderer assassinated the victim a few meters from her house, hitting her on the head several times with a hammer. He also took 10 rubles and personal items from Chulyukova, including two bags. The victim regained consciousness, however, this was noticed by the killer who was planning on leaving the scene, instead returning and finishing the job. When the ambulance took Chulyukova, she was still alive but died the following week. The victim left behind a young daughter. Elena Korshunova, who lived nearby, had witnessed the murder. She heard a scream coming from Chulyukova's house and looked out of the window. Thanks to the street light and shadows, she noticed on the wall of the neighbouring house, lit by a lantern, a figure hitting another one on the head with a hammer, then dragging it onto the ground.

The investigation suggested that the murders were committed by one person. There were a lot of rumours about the motive for the crimes: there was a common opinion among schoolchildren that the killer chose victims as a result of a card party, others claimed that he killed people based on certain grounds - those who stand last in the line, buying movie tickets to a certain place or wearing rings. All these rumours reached the investigators. Once at a bus stop, two women, talking about the killer, were arguing over who he was and where he worked: at a slaughterhouse or as an orderly at a morgue. Traumatologist Toropov was present at the stop and intervened in the conversation by saying: "Do you not get tired of telling me bad things?" (According to another version, Toropov was riding in a bus and joked about being involved in the killings). The arguing women went away, but one of them remembered some of Toropov's features, which resulted in his arrest the next day. A version was worked out that Toropov was killing people out of professional interest, but investigators established his innocence. However, the doctor had to leave Leninsk-Kuznetsky, because it was rumoured that he had bought off justice. There were some further rumours about the offender's identity: it was told that a criminal gang commits the murders, or the murderer is either a man nicknamed "Frenchman", or his brother, or a bald man wearing a wig and fake moustache.

The third victim of Shcherbakov was Nadezhda Medvedeva, who worked the night shift. Soon after this, a resident of the city went to the police station, claiming that he had found a human head in a garbage can. Arriving police found out that it was a dummy.

On 15 July, Shcherbakov attacked and stabbed Tatyana Galkina, but the victim managed to escape from the killer. Doctors managed to save her life. On the same day, he committed the fourth murder in the Gorky Park, killing 15-year-old Vera Kolesnikova. The killer first raped the victim before killing her, and then strangled the girl with a handkerchief, stolen from one of the previous victims. On 20 July, Shcherbakov himself called the police, saying that he had found the body. The traces found at the crime scene indicated that the killer, having made the attack, had left something on the ground (it later turned out to be a tent).

Panic broke out in Leninsk-Kuznetsky. Employees of enterprises refused to go into the evening shift, and internal troops were alerted. Police officers travelled to the enterprises, calling for reporting on every suspicious case. Many other crimes were disclosed. A theory that the killer was a foreigner was discussed, but without any result.

The murderer's fifth victim became Ekaterina Lizunova. Shcherbakov entered the construction trailer in which she worked, raping and then killing the woman. This time, the crime was committed during the day. In addition to the traumatic brain injury, there were traces of suffocation on the victim's body. There was a witness who saw a young man enter the trailer. From a distance, the witness could not examine the killer in detail, but the investigators realized that the maniac was changing tactics. The case began to consider the regional committee of the party and the Ministry of Internal Affairs.

After Lizunova's murder, the killer attacked a mine worker, but her overalls saved her life. The woman managed to scratch the attacker's face, and part of the killer's blood remained under her nails, which allowed the investigators to find out his blood type. Another victim of the attacker threw a bag on Shcherbakov. He stumbled and fell, letting the victim get away. In a conversation with the police, she said outwardly that her attacker was "handsome". Witnesses of the attacks reported seeing a man with a pram near the crime scene.

On 21 September, the killer committed his sixth and final murder. The victim was Elena Muratova. She was returning from the disco with her friend, and at that moment Shcherbakov went after the girls, who suggested that he take Muratova home, saying that she could become the killer's next victim. She refused, but Shcherbakov continued to follow them. When the girls parted, the killer struck Muratova 40 times to the head with a hammer and stole her gold watch. Gauze bags of chemical protection were found at the crime scene.

While committing the murders, Sergey Shcherbakov presented himself as an exemplary family man in order to ward off suspicion from himself. He met his wife from work, saying that he was afraid that some would attack her, but would later leave the house searching for victims.

=== Arrest, trial and execution ===
A riot was brewing in Leninsk-Kuznetsky, with even the city prosecutor resigning. Then suddenly, Elena Muratova's friend told the deputy chief of the ATS from the executive committee, Stepan Krioni, that she knew what street the attacker lived on. Authorities started to observe the area. In the courtyard of Shcherbakov's house, the tent was discovered soaked in a barrel, which he had spread out before raping and killing Kolesnikova, and an old pram, with gauze bags lying on the ground. A gold watch stolen from the last victim was found in the outerwear pocket. Also noting Shcherbakov's recent scratch on the cheek, the police arrested him. During the subsequent search, stolen ammunition from the army and gold jewellery that belonged to the victims were located.

During the investigative experiments, Shcherbakov confessed everything, saying that he felt pleasure talking about the attacks. However, then the offender's mother told him on a prison visit that his childhood friend Viktor Popov, who suffered from alcoholism, had hanged himself. After that, Shcherbakov changed his testimony, pinning all the crimes on Popov. It took two years to work out the accusation, with the investigators eventually being convinced of the deceased's innocence. During some of the crimes, Popov had had an alibi: he was outside Leninsk-Kuznetsky or was in a drunk tank.

At trial, the maniac tried to obtain a mitigation of punishment, claiming that the girl who ditched him had broken his life. The Leninsk-Kuznetsky court sentenced Sergey Shcherbakov to death by firing squad, with confiscation of property. The convict appealed the verdict to the Supreme Court of the Soviet Union, but he was denied a pardon. On 26 September 1988, in the Kemerovo Custody, the sentence was carried out. Despite this, there were rumours that Shcherbakov was not executed but instead sent to work in the uranium mines.

== In the media ==
- Documentary film from the series "The investigation was conducted..." (Sledstvie veli...) - "The Handsome One"

== See also ==
- List of Russian serial killers
