= Nikolai Fefilov =

Soviet serial killer and rapist

- Born: Nikolai Borisovich Fefilov; 24 July 1946; Sverdlovsk, Sverdlovsk Oblast, RSFSR
- Died: 30 August 1988 (aged 42); Sverdlovsk, Sverdlovsk Oblast, RSFSR
- Cause of death: Strangulation
- Other names: "The Urals Strangler" "The Kontrolnaya Strangler" "The Elusive Predator" "The Necrophile"
- Conviction: Murdered before trial
- Penalty: Murdered before trial

Details
- Victims: 7
- Span of crimes: 1982–1988
- Country: Soviet Union
- State: Sverdlovsk
- Date apprehended: 25 April 1988

Nikolai Borisovich Fefilov (Russian: Никола́й Бори́сович Фефи́лов; 24 July 1946 – 30 August 1988), known as The Urals Strangler (Russian: Уральский душитель), was a Soviet serial killer. Between 1982 and 1988, he killed seven women and girls in Sverdlovsk, with six of the murders involving rape.

== Biography ==
After school, Fefilov joined the army and was demobilized in 1966. At the same time, he developed feelings for his neighbour, but she rejected him. This rejection was suggested as a reason for the subsequent killings. A few years later, Fefilov married, and the couple had two daughters. He worked as a printer at a publishing house of the "Ural Worker" newspaper. He was constantly in conflict with his wife because he could not get a separate apartment, while the family was forced to live in a communal. On the day Fefilov committed the first murder, another quarrel had occurred in the family.

=== 1982 murder and the Georgy Khabarov case ===
Fefilov committed the first murder in a forest belt near the Staro-Moskovsky road, in the area of the Kontrolnaya bus stop in Verkh-Isetsky district, on 29 April 1982. His victim was a 5th-grade student of the 41st school named Lena Mangusheva. Fefilov raped her and then strangled the girl with a pioneer tie, covering the body with branches afterwards. He took the rucksack from the deceased girl, from which he stole a pencil case and two textbooks, and then threw it into the toilet of a gas station.

The body of Mangusheva was discovered the next day. During the investigation of the murder, special attention was paid to the verification of persons previously convicted of sexual offences.

On 5 May, according to a Sverdlovsk resident, a 28-year-old intellectually disabled man named Georgy Khabarov who was released in 1970, was responsible for attempted rape, previously convicted for three years for robbery. At the first interrogation, Khabarov said that on 29 April, when the murder occurred, he was at home all day. But on 7 May, after a series of interrogations, he was forced to confess to the rape and murder of the girl. However, he incorrectly indicated the crime scene, the method of murder (he claimed that he had killed her with a knife), inaccurately described the appearance of the murdered girl, her underwear and the missing rucksack, which was still not found, and often changed his testimony.

On 17 and 18 July, acquaintances of Khabarov named Vtoroy and Yenkov were questioned, who said that they had seen him in the vicinity of the murder scene on 28 or 29 April, then Yenkov began to assert that he had seen Khabarov on 29 April at 15 o'clock. Full-time rates with Khabarov's witnesses were not held, and the contradictions in date and time were not solved. Other acquaintances and relatives of Khabarov claimed that he came to the village of the 8th kilometre of the Old Moscow Tract, but after 28 April, he did not appear there. Khabarov's mother said that on the following day, her son was home all day.

Subsequent examination showed that the blood type of Khabarov coincided with that of the killer, determined from the sperm found on the girl's body. After Fefilov's arrest, a repeated examination indicated that the blood type was identified incorrectly.

Despite the contradictions in testimony and lack of evidence, Khabarov was brought to court. On 24 September 1982, the Sverdlovsk Regional Court found Georgy Khabarov guilty and sentenced him to 14 years imprisonment. He was charged with the rape and murder of Lena Mangusheva, as well as the attempted rape of another victim and the battery of a third.

After the trial, Khabarov wrote a cassation appeal to the Supreme Court of Russia, in which he claimed that on 29 April 1982, he was not near the area of murder, denying the charges of murder and attempted rape, claiming that during the investigation he had been accused of physical and psychological abuse by law enforcement officials. At the same time, the Supreme Court of the RSFSR received a cassation complaint from the mother of Mangusheva, who asked to cancel the conviction and to impose the death penalty on him. To her complaint, she attached a collective letter to the workers of one of the enterprises of Sverdlovsk, demanding that Khabarov be executed. On 22 November 1982, the Judicial Collegium for Criminal Cases of the Supreme Court of the RSFSR considered both cassation complaints. The sentence of the Sverdlovsk Regional Court was cancelled, and the case was sent for a new consideration from the trial stage to the same court, but in a different composition.

On 23 March 1983, the Sverdlovsk Regional Court convicted Georgy Khabarov of rape and murder against Lena Mangusheva, also incriminating him in other crimes, sentencing him to death. On 27 April 1984, he was executed.

=== 1983 and 1984 murders and Mikhail Titov case. ===
At the time when Khabarov was kept on death row, at the "Kontrolnaya" stop, Fefilov killed again. On 7 August 1983, Fefilov raped and strangled with a belt a 22-year-old female student and VIZ worker Gulnara Yakupova, hiding her body in the bushes and her clothes in a raspberry tree near the stadium near the Staro-Moskovsy road. Yakupova had arrived in Sverdlovsk from Bashkiria, so her disappearance was not immediately noticed. The girl's body was found on 7 October. After the murder, the killer came to the crime scene three times - on 30 August, 23 September and on 8 or 9 October.

On 11 May 1984, not far from where Mangusheva was murdered, Natasha Lapshina, a 5th-grade pupil of the 41st school was the next person targeted. This time, Fefilov not only raped and strangled the girl, but desecrated her corpse by inserting a stick into her genitals. The girl's body was then thrown into a water-filled ditch, and her clothes were scattered around the country road. Fefilov took a case filled with markers from Lapshina's rucksack. Her body was discovered the following day.

During the investigation into the murder of Yakupova, her neighbours in the hostel said that the girl complained about the persistent courtship of Mikhail Titov. At the end of May 1984, he was detained for harassing girls on the street. It later turned out that he was registered at a psychoneurological dispensary.

Soon, Titov was forced to confess to the murders of Yakupova and Lapshina. He constantly changed testimony, could not show where the crime scene was and answer where he put the stolen items of the deceased. However, the investigators did not take these things into account. There was a witness who claimed that she had seen Titov on the day of the murder near the crime scene, but it later turned out that she was registered in the city's psychiatric hospital.

One and a half months after the arrest, Titov, who had received numerous injuries, was admitted to the prison hospital where he later died. For this incident, the head of the prison was removed from his post. The murder cases of Yakupova and Lapshina were closed due to the death of the accused.

=== 1985 murder and Ivan Antropov case ===
On 6 May 1985, on the lakeside of the Staro-Moskovsky road, Fefilov raped and strangled a 21-year-old art and technical school student named Larisa Dyachuk. He then further mistreated her corpse, again, inserting a stick into her genitalia. The girl's clothes and items were then scattered around the crime scene. Fefilov did not hide the body, but took the ring, medallion, wristwatch and medical scalpel from the victim. Her corpse was found on 17 May.

A month later, the two underage Yashkin brothers, who were forced to confess to Dyachuk's murder, were detained and named two of their acquaintances as accomplices. The Yashkins were kept under arrest until the autumn of 1985, but they failed to prove their involvement in the murder.

Then, on suspicion of the same murder, Ivan Antropov, a fireman from the forestry enterprise, was arrested. Paint was found on his jacket, which, according to experts' opinions, was identical to that found among Dyachuk's things. Re-examination established that the paint on Antropov's jacket and the colours of the murdered girl did not have a common genetic basis.

Despite the absence of evidence to his guilt, Antropov's case was twice brought to court and returned for further investigation. Ivan Antropov was under arrest for ten months in a pre-trial detention centre until the next year, when the real killer committed a new murder.

=== 1986 murder and the serial killer version ===
On 26 May 1986, near the stadium on the Staro-Moskovsky tract, Fefilov raped and strangled a student of the Ural State Medical University, Olga Timofeeva. As in the previous two cases, the killer desecrated the corpse, inserting a stick into the genitals and also cutting off her breasts. He then covered the body with some branches, taking a wristwatch, a gold ring with a stone and sports trousers from the victim. Timofeeva's body was found two days later.

At this time, the senior security officer of the Sverdlovsk Police Department Yuri Kokovikhin turned his attention to the similarity of the ongoing killings in the area of the "Kontrolnaya" bus stop in the Verkh-Isetsky district. In the Verkh-Isetsky District Department of Internal Affairs, criminal cases from recent years were checked. While examining them, Kokovikhin concluded that the killings were committed by one person, of which he wrote a report on and sent to the leadership of the Department of Internal Affairs. He proposed the creation of a single operational-investigative group to search for the criminal, but his version did not find support among colleagues.

After the murder of Olga Timofeeva, considerable forces were thrown in to search for the criminal. All seven Sverdlovsk ROVDs allocated a certain number of employees daily in operational investigations. Police officers patrolled and ambushed around the Kontrolnaya bus stop. Old criminal cases were reviewed and psychoneurological dispensaries were checked.

But the actions of the police and prosecutors did not have a clear plan. Kokovikhin's version was still rejected. A theory was proposed that Kokovikhin himself committed the murders in an effort to prove that he was right. His independent actions caused great dissatisfaction with the leadership and he was removed from the investigation, and subsequently dismissed from the police force.

The Sverdlovsk Regional Party Committee demanded the immediate arrest of the killer. The father of the aforementioned Yashkin brothers, who was arrested for forging documents, was forced to write a confession, but then refuted his testimony. His guilt could not be proven.

=== 1987 murder ===
The measures taken during the search for the killer forced Fefilov to change his hunting grounds: he stopped killing at the Kontrolnaya bus stop, and instead moved to other areas in the city.

The next crime was committed in the Zheleznodorozhny District. On 22 May 1987, not far from the VIZ train station, Fefilov raped and strangled 19-year-old Elena Kook with a belt. He then abused her corpse, inserted a stick into the girl's genitals and cut off her breasts. He then threw her body into the bushes near the railway embankment, where it was found the next day.

Three people were arrested - the mentally challenged Galiyev, Karasyov (in 1985 he was suspected of murdering Dyachuk, as it was he who found the body) and the also mentally challenged Vodyankin. Soon, all three confessed to the murder of Elena Kook, with Vodyankin also confessing to the four other murders committed near the Kontrolnaya bus stop.

=== Arrest, death and aftermath ===
Fefilov's last crime was committed in the Oktyabrsky District. On 25 April 1988, in the Mayakovsky Central Park of Culture and Rest, he tried to rape and then strangled a young woman. He took a wristwatch, a purse with money, a gold ring and glasses from the deceased. While trying to hide the body, Yevgeny Mordvyanik, a senior lieutenant of the internal service of the Interior Ministry who happened to be near the crime scene, detained him.

On 7 May, information about the arrest of the serial killer was published in the newspaper Sovetskaya Rossiya. In order to investigate the murders, investigators for particularly important cases of the Prosecutor's Office of the RSFSR Viktor Pantelei and Vladimir Parshikov flew to Sverdlovsk.

After his arrest, Nikolai Fefilov began confessing to his crimes, including the murder of Mangusheva, for which Georgy Khabarov was convicted and executed. His testimony was confirmed during the investigative experiments, during one of which a portfolio belonging to the murdered girl was found. While searching through Fefilov's apartment and workplace, the printing houses from the "Ural Worker" newspaper found the belongings of the victims, which were later identified by their relatives and friends.

Forensic psychiatric examinations found that Fefilov was sane. The investigation into the murder series hit the reputation of law enforcement agencies of the Sverdlovsk Oblast hard, coupled with the fact that the serial killer's trial could turn into a scandal. However, on 30 August, Fefilov was strangled by his cellmate in prison. Officially, the cause of the murder was a quarrel, but a theory was proposed that the leadership of the police and the prosecutor's office in Sverdlovsk did not want to see him live long enough to face trial. Investigators from the Prosecutor's Office of the RSFSR investigated the murder, but failed to prove that it was a hit job. On 25 October, the criminal case against Nikolai Fefilov was terminated due to the death of the accused.

In 1989, Georgy Khabarov was posthumously rehabilitated from the murder of Lena Mangusheva.

None of the law enforcement officers of Sverdlovsk were prosecuted for initiating fabricated criminal cases against Khabarov and the other detainees. The accused were the victims of the arrest of the offending Deputy Chief of the Verkh-Isetsky District Department of Internal Affairs, Col. Shirokov, and the then-deceased criminal investigator Kabanov.

== See also ==
- List of Russian serial killers
