= Gunārs Astra =

Latvian human rights activist (1931–1988)

- Born: 22 October 1931; Riga, Latvia
- Died: 6 April 1988 (aged 56); Leningrad, USSR
- Known for: human rights activism

Gunārs Astra (22 October 1931 – 6 April 1988) was a Latvian human rights activist and an anti-Soviet dissident who was arrested by the Soviet Union in 1961, and was sentenced to prison for 15 years. He was released in 1976. In 1983, he was arrested again, but released several weeks before his death.

== Biography ==
Gunārs Astra was born in Riga, on 22 October 1931. He graduated from primary school and later continued his education in an electromechanical technical school. After graduation in 1952, he started to work in one of the largest electromechanical factories in the Latvian SSR – VEF. Because Astra was a very erudite and industrious worker, he was granted a promotion and became chief of the 7th Radio manufacturing workshop. He also studied the English language in university as an external student.

In 1958, Gunārs Astra had the chance to meet American diplomats in Riga. This encounter had a great influence on him in his later life, allowing him to consider Western culture and develop an innate opposition to Communism and the USSR. In 1961, Astra was accused of spying, promoting anti-Soviet propaganda, and homeland betrayal, and was sentenced to 15 years in prison. He was imprisoned in Mordovia, and later in the Perm Oblast. During his custody, he educated himself and met other political prisoners from all over the Soviet Union.

Astra was released in 1976 and returned to Latvia. He had not changed his political views and continued to oppose the Soviet regime. In 1983, he was arrested for the second time and sentenced to 7 years imprisonment. This time he was accused of possessing and distributing anti-Soviet literature, one of them being George Orwell's 1984. In courts proceeding the Soviet rule, Astra became known for his famous final statement, in which he condemned the Soviet regime. He ended his speech by saying, "I believe that these times will disappear like a nightmare does. That gives me the strength to stand and breathe here."

He was released from prison in February 1988, but died in a hospital in Leningrad on 6 April shortly afterwards, from heart disease. Nevertheless, there remain unconfirmed theories that the KGB was involved in his death. His funeral in Riga was reportedly attended by 10,000 people.

There is a commemorative plaque on the District Court building in Riga where Astra was sentenced, and a street in the capital bears his name.

Gunārs Astra lies in the Forest Cemetery in Riga.

On 3 May 2019, he was posthumously awarded with the Order of Viesturs.

On 20 January 2022, a monument to him was unveiled in front of the Latvian Supreme Court building.

== Bibliography ==
1998. Novel Gunars Astra written by Māris Ruks (awarded the General Goppers Prize (USA) – a historical documentary of the most renowned defenders of human rights, renewal of independence in the Baltic States and dissident Gunārs Astra).
