= Sasha Putrya =

Artist from Ukraine (1977–1989)

- Born: Sasha Aleksandra Putrya; December 2, 1977; Poltava, USSR
- Died: January 24, 1989 (aged 11); Poltava, USSR
- Resting place: Poltava, Ukraine
- Known for: Painting

Sasha Putrya (Ukrainian: Саша Путря; December 2, 1977 – January 24, 1989) was a Ukrainian artist who became notable through painting thousands of artworks, before dying at the age of 11 from leukemia.

== Biography ==
Sasha (Oleksandra) Putrya was born on 2 December 1977 and lived in the region of Poltava, Ukrainian SSR. Having started painting at the age of 3, by the time of her death at age 11, she had created around 2,279 paintings and drawings, many of which are collected within 46 albums and are on display in Poltava Art Museum in Poltava, Ukraine.

She had an intense interest in India, though she had never been there—she loved the country, its music, clothes, and customs, and even dreamed of marrying the Indian film actor Mithun Chakraborty. Sasha Putrya died on 24 January 1989 of leukemia. She was buried, dressed in Indian saris with a small photo of Mithun Chakraborty, her lifetime talisman.
