= Kirill Akilov =

Russian footballer

Personal information
- Full name: Kirill Igorevich Akilov
- Date of birth: 12 June 1989 (age 37)
- Height: 1.81 m (5 ft 11 in)
- Position: Midfielder

Youth career
- FC Spartak Moscow

Senior career*
Years	Team	Apps	(Gls)
2007–2008	FC Khimki	0	(0)
2009	FC Sibir Novosibirsk	2	(0)
2010–2011	FC Khimki	4	(0)
2012–2013	FC Khimki-2		
2016–2017	Mozhaysky Rayon Moscow		
- * Club domestic league appearances and goals

Kirill Igorevich Akilov (Russian: Кирилл Игоревич Акилов; born 12 June 1989) is a former Russian professional football player.

== Club career ==
He played two seasons in the Russian Football National League for FC Sibir Novosibirsk and FC Khimki.
