= Astemir Apanasov =

Circassian singer (born 1989)

Astemir Apanasov Апанас Астэмыр (Adyghe) Астемир Апанасов (Russian)
- Born: September 21, 1989 (age 36); Nalchik
- Genres: pop, folk

Astemir Apanasov (Russian: Астемир Валерьевич Апанасов; born September 21, 1989, Nalchik) is a Circassian singer, musician, and composer.

He received several awards including Honored Artist of the Republic of Adygea, Honored Artist Of the Kabardino-Balkarian Republic, Honored Artist of the Karachay-Cherkess Republic, Grand Prix of the All-Russian competition "Blue Bird", victory in the final and superfinal of the television competition "Morning Star" (2003), Winner of the International Competition "Hopes of Europe", laureate of the International Theater Festival Fringe in Edinburgh (Scotland), laureate of the IV Annual Prize of the first all-Caucasian ethnomusic TV channel "9 Wave", laureate of the I and II prizes of the International Competition "Hopes of Europe".

== Biography ==
He was born to a Circassian Chemguy-Kabardian family on September 21, 1989, in the city of Nalchik of the Kabardino-Balkarian Autonomous Soviet Socialist Republic. He studied under the guidance of Professor Valery Garkalin.

== Activity ==
He participated in creative projects together with Sergei Bezrukov, Maxim Razuvaev, Vladimir Pankov, Stas Namin, Yulia Mikhalchik and Aleksey Goman. He participated in the television program "Big Difference". He worked in conjunction with the Circassian "Coffeetime" group.

== In theater ==
- Musical "Three Musketeers", dir. S. Krasnoperets - D'Artanyan, guardsman, musketeer.
- Musical "Hair", dir. Beau Crowell (USA), Stas Namin - Claude, the tribe of love.
- S. Mrozhek "Serenade", dir. Valery Garkalin - Head of the family.
- "On the verge of spring", dir. M. Razuvaev, A. Davydov, G. Auerbach.
- "Little Witch" dir. P. Gaiduchenko and O. Lopukhov are a raven.
- "Above the clear blue sky", dir. A. Rubinstein (England, Edinburgh).
- Beatlemania, dir. Stas Namin.
- Snow White and the Seven Dwarfs, dir. A. Davydov - Friday-gnome, Queen's advisor.
- Alice in Wonderland, dir. I. Zamotaev, A. Prokuratov.
- The Bremen Town Musicians is a jester.
- V. Voinovich "Soldier Ivan Chonkin", dir. Andrey Rossinsky, with the participation of Vladimir Voinovich.
- A. Ostrovsky "The Snow Maiden", dir. Vladimir Pankov.
- B. Vasiliev "Tomorrow Was the War" dir. per. RF M. Razuvaev - Sasha Stameskin.
- A. Pushkin "Feast during the plague" dir. per. RF M. Razuvaev.
- The Broadway Musical "Chaplin" Role - Chaplin directed by Warren Carlisle

== In films and television ==
- Main Stage 2 (2015) as part of the Coffee Time Band.
- "Big difference"
- "Shelter of Comedians"
- "Life Line" in 2009
- Channel "First game" - TV presenter.
