= Yezhov =

Yezhov or Ezhov (Russian: Ежов) is a Russian masculine surname derived from the word yozh (Russian: ёж), meaning hedgehog; its feminine counterpart is Yezhova or Ezhova. It may refer to:

- Denis Ezhov (born 1985), Russian ice hockey player
- Elena Ezhova (born 1977), Ukraine-born Russian volleyball player
- Elena Yezhova (1793–1853), Russian stage actress and opera singer
- Ilya Ezhov (born 1987), Russian ice hockey goaltender
- Ludmila Ezhova (born 1982), Russian artistic gymnast
- Nikolay Yezhov (1895–1940), Soviet secret police official
- Pyotr Yezhov (1900–1975), Russian football player
- Roman Yezhov (born 1997), Russian football player
- Valentin Yezhov (1921–2004), Russian screenwriter and playwright
- Yekaterina Yezhova (1787–1837), Russian stage actress
- Yevgeni Yezhov (born 1995), Russian football defender
