= Kachorovska Alina =

Fashion designer

- Качоровська Аліна Генадівна
- Born: 17 October 1988 (age 37); Zhytomyr, Ukraine
- Education: National University of Kyiv-Mohyla Academy
- Occupations: Ukrainian entrepreneur, creative director of the Kachorovska, co-owner of Kacho Group
- Label: Kachorovska
- Website: https://kachorovska.com/

Alina Kachorovska (married name Ocheretiana; born 17 October 1988, Zhytomyr) is a Ukrainian entrepreneur, creative director of the Kachorovska fashion brand, and co-owner of Kacho Group.

== Biography ==
Alina Kachorovska was born on 17 October 1988 in Zhytomyr, Ukraine. She comes from a family with a background in shoemaking: her grandmother and mother worked at a shoe factory, while the family also operated a small shoe manufacturing and repair workshop in Zhytomyr. From an early age, Kachorovska was involved in the family business, which later influenced her professional career.

In 2005, she moved to Kyiv, where she enrolled in the Faculty of Law at the National University of Kyiv-Mohyla Academy.

While studying, she began developing the family business in Kyiv and introduced a new format to its operations. In 2010, she accepted the first order for a pair of custom-made shoes at the family workshop in Kyiv. That same year, her husband, Ruslan Ocheretiany, joined the development of the business. The family workshop gradually evolved into a made-to-measure atelier producing shoes and bags, with manufacturing based in Zhytomyr.

In 2013, the first collection of shoes and bags under the Kachorovska brand was presented, marking the beginning of the development of the eponymous Ukrainian fashion brand.

== Career ==
Alina Kachorovska is a co-owner of Kacho Group and the creative director of Kachorovska. Under her leadership, the brand has expanded its design direction to include footwear, bags and clothing, as well as projects in contemporary art, design and cultural initiatives. She is also a member of the Mohyla Academy community of the National University of Kyiv-Mohyla Academy.

Kachorovska is a speaker at professional events focused on entrepreneurship, the development of the Ukrainian fashion industry, the creative economy and the international expansion of Ukrainian brands. Over the years, she has participated in business forums and industry conferences, including the Ukrainian Marketing Forum, where she has taken part in panel discussions on the development of Ukrainian brands, international expansion, marketing and corporate social responsibility. She has also participated in events organised by Forbes Ukraine focused on entrepreneurship, women's leadership and the development of Ukrainian business.

In addition to Kachorovska's participation in Ukrainian Fashion Week as a regular participant, Kachorovska has contributed to the development of Ukrainian Fashion Week as an institution. She has participated as an expert in public discussions and industry events dedicated to the development of the Ukrainian fashion industry.

In 2025, together with Kachorovska co-owner Ruslan Ocheretiany and director and gallerist Maksym Bernadskyi, she co-founded MISTRIKA, a contemporary Ukrainian art gallery in Kyiv specialising in the presentation and promotion of contemporary Ukrainian art.

== Personal life ==
Alina Kachorovska is married to entrepreneur, artist and Kacho Group co-owner Ruslan Ocheretiany. They have three children.

Kachorovska has practised ballroom dancing for many years. She is interested in contemporary Ukrainian art, architecture and design. Together with Ruslan Ocheretiany, she supports Ukrainian artists. In 2025, she co-founded the MISTRIKA contemporary art gallery in Kyiv. Her interest in art also includes collecting, supporting Ukrainian artists and collaborating with art institutions.

== Awards and recognition ==
- 2021 — named among the 30 Ukrainian women with the greatest achievements in business by NV.
- 2026 — received the UP 100. The Power of Women award in the Business category from Ukrainska Pravda.
