= Boris, you are wrong =

"Boris, you are wrong" (Russian: Борис, ты не прав) is a political catchphrase, an interpretation of the phrase originally said by Yegor Ligachev to Boris Yeltsin on 1 July 1988 to tackle Yeltsin's split from Soviet politics.

== Origins ==
Ligachev was at the time a member of the Politburo, while Yeltsin was First Deputy Chairman of the Soviet State Committee for Construction. Speaking at the 19th All-Union Conference of the CPSU, Yeltsin offered a sharp criticism of the Politburo, and Ligachev personally, for being insufficiently democratic and slowing down the Perestroika.

Ligachev's speech was a direct rebuttal for Yeltsin:

Dear comrades. It is probably harder for me than for anyone else in the leadership to speak in connection with the speech given by Boris Nikolaiyevich Yeltsin. This is not because my name is mentioned, but that the time has simply come to tell the whole truth.

Why is it difficult to speak? It is difficult to speak because it was I who recommended him for inclusion in the Central Committee Secretariat and the Politburo.

What was I proceeding from? I proceeded from the fact that Boris Nikolaiyevich Yeltsin is an energetic person, that at the time he had great experience in leading the prominent Sverdlovsk party organization, which is a big one respected by all in our party. I have seen it at work. I visited Sverdlovsk as a secretary of the Central Committee.

I cannot be silent because Communist Yeltsin has taken the wrong road. It has turned out that this person does not possess a constructive but a destructive force. His evaluation of the process of restructuring, his approach and methods of work have been recognized by the party as groundless and mistaken.

Note, comrades, that such a conclusion was reached both by the Moscow city party committee and the party Central Committee, where he was in good health. More than 50 people spoke at the plenums of the Moscow city committee and the Central Committee and all of them unanimously adopted the decision that you are familiar with.

I knew that he was going to speak. There were sensible proposals in his speech but on the whole it went to show that you, Boris, have not drawn the right political conclusions.

What is more, you have presented the whole of our policy as an improvision from start to finish. [...]

Some sources suggest that "within days" or "within just a few weeks" after the event people in Moscow started to wear lapel buttons saying, "Yegor, you are wrong!" as well as distributing posters and badges that said "Boris, you are right."

However, other sources suggest that the form "Boris, you are wrong" became popular only after the 1989 monologue "The Baltics Deputy" by the comedian Gennady Khazanov, written by Aleksandr Tarasul, which was a satirical interpretation of the political developments in the USSR with its plot transferred to the 17th century Russia. In the piece, Malyuta Skuratov criticized Boris Godunov, saying: "You are wrong, Boris".

The phrase has been used in later Russian publications to admonish or rebuke the opposing side in the form "N, you are wrong". Following Yeltsin's death in 2007, Ligachev upheld his criticism by saying that what he told Yeltsin back then was right in his opinion. Ligachev's own 2012 memoir book is titled Boris Was Wrong (ISBN 978-5-4438-0089-9).
