= Vytautas Vičiulis =

Lithuanian painter and antiques restorer

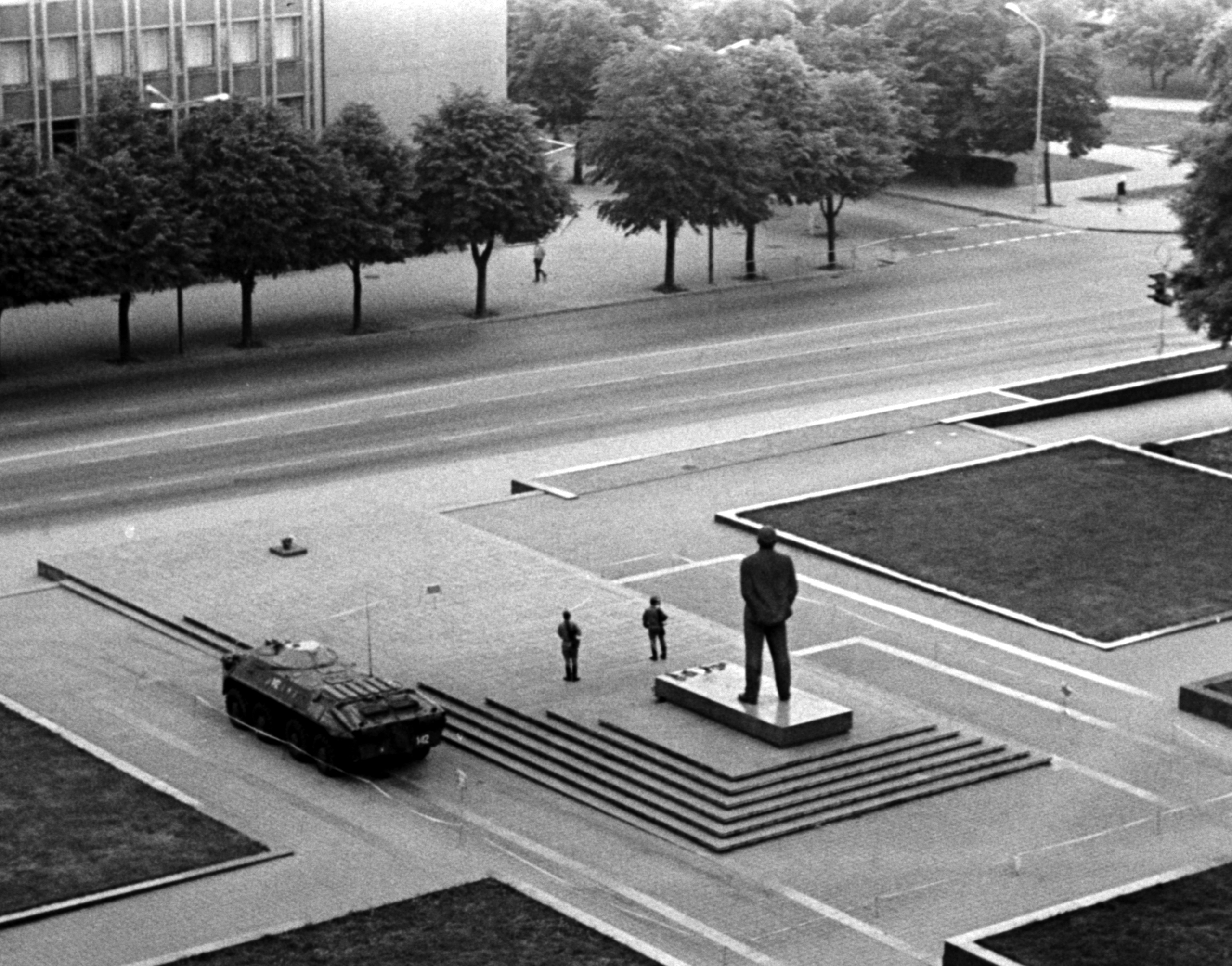
Monument of Lenin in Klaipėda, defended by Soviet soldiers, Lithuania, 1991

Vytautas Vičiulis (16 October 1951 – 3 March 1989) was a Lithuanian painter and antiques restorer, better known for his self-immolation for political reasons, who was born in Skuodas district and died in Klaipėda. Protesting against the Soviet occupation of the Baltic States, he burned himself in Klaipėda close to the monument of Lenin in the late evening of 2 March 1989. Severely burned, he died in hospital at 9 pm on 3 March. Vičiulis used fuel to set himself ablaze. Remains of the flag of Lithuania were found on his body.

== See also ==
- Romas Kalanta
