= Olha Bura =

Ukrainian activist (1986–2014)

Hero of Ukraine Olha Bura
- Ольга Бура
- Born: Olha Vasylivna Bura; 22 July 1986; Ripniv, Ukrainian SSR
- Died: 10 March 2014 (aged 27); Kyiv, Ukraine
- Occupation: Activist
- Years active: 2002–2014
- Awards: Hero of Ukraine

Olha Vasylivna Bura (Ukrainian: Ольга Василівна Бура; 22 July 1986 – 10 March 2014) was a Ukrainian activist who took part in the Euromaidan protests in Kyiv from late 2013 to early 2014. Born to a poor family in Busk Raion, she did not have a permanent place to work due to illness, doing various jobs in the family home, working briefly at a local bakery as well as doing childcare. Bura died after contracting a blood infection from her hand being injured by members of the Berkut some days before consulting doctors. She was posthumously conferred the title of Hero of Ukraine with the Order of the Gold Star.

A memorial plaque was installed on the primary school in Ripniv she attended, and a sign in the Alley of Memory of the Heroes of the Heavenly Hundred of Lviv Region in Khodoriv was named for her.

== Biography ==
On 22 July 1986, Bura was born in the village of Ripniv, Busk Raion, Lviv Oblast, Ukrainian SSR. She was from a poor family, and was brought up in the village of Zhuratin. Bura had three siblings and was the daughter of Nadezhda. From her youth, she was unwell due to a weak kidney and was classified in the third group of disabilities. Bura was educated at Ripniv school from 1993 and then attended Novomylyatyn Secondary School of grades I-III until 2002.

Upon leaving secondary school, she was not required to go and find employment due to her being placed in the third group of disabilities. Bura helped out with jobs at home and briefly worked at a local bakery. She helped the local community to dig potatoes, collect beets and herding cows. Bura also worked as a nanny doing childcare. She did not acquire a permanent job during her lifetime. Bura was married twice (her first husband predeceased her) and did not have any children from both marriages.

She began taking part in the Euromaidan protests at Maidan Nezalezhnosti in Kyiv from 24 November 2013. Bura and her husband spent the following three months and helped the Sea Hundred" Maidan protesters starting from 1 December 2013, guarding and constructing barricades and also working in the kitchen and warehouse. She died in a hospital in Kyiv on 10 March 2014 after contracting a blood infection from her hand being injured by members of the Berkut some days before consulting doctors. On the morning of 13 March, Bura received a funeral service in Ripniv, and she was buried in the village on the same day.

== Awards ==
President Petro Poroshenko conferred Bura the title of Hero of Ukraine posthumously "For civic courage, patriotism, heroic defense of the constitutional foundations of democracy, human rights and freedoms, selfless service to the Ukrainian people, demonstrated during the Revolution of Dignity" in November 2014. In June 2015, she was posthumously awarded the Medal "For sacrifice and love of Ukraine" by the Ukrainian Orthodox Church – Kyiv Patriarchate. A memorial plaque dedicated to her on facade of Ripniv Elementary School was unveiled in April 2016. The following month, Bura posthumously received the Certificate of the Supreme Archbishop of Kyiv-Halytskyi Svyatoslav of the Ukrainian Greek Catholic Church. Her name and portrait are engraved on the engraved on both the Kyiv and Lviv memorials of the Heroes of the Heavenly Hundred and a sign in the Alley of Memory of the Heroes of the Heavenly Hundred of Lviv Region in Khodoriv was named for her. Bura was also named an honorary citizen of Busk Raion.
