= Kolpashevsky Yar =

Kolpashevsky Yar is a high steep bank of the Ob River in the city of Kolpashevo, Tomsk Region, Russia.

It is known mainly as the place of mass graves of people who were shot or died in the NKVD prison in the Narym district in the 1930s - 1940s. According to the Memorial society, the total number of people buried in the Kolpashevsky Yar is about 4000 people. The burials were accidentally opened in late April - early May 1979, when the spring flood of the Ob River washed the banks and exposed one of them, but soon the remains and signs of the burials were eliminated. In 1992, a memorial sign about the intention to erect a monument to the victims was installed at the burial site.

== Executions and burials ==
A. Spragovsky, senior investigator of the KGB in the Tomsk Region, who worked in the Tomsk Region in the 1955-1960s and participated in the rehabilitation of the repressed, quotes the testimony of one of the executors of the death sentences in 1937, who showed that next to the building of the Narymsky district department of the NKVD in Kolpashevo “there was a large platform surrounded by a high fence, a pit was dug there, where you could go up on a specially arranged ladder. At the time of the execution, the performers were in a shelter, and when the arrested man approached a certain place, a shot rang out and he fell into the pit. In order to save ammunition, a loop suffocation system using soap was introduced.”

The firing squad (1937-1938) of the NKVD employees who carried out executions:

1. Ulyanov Nikolay Alekseevich - head of the Narymsky district department of the NKVD for NSO ZSK USSR, lieutenant of state security of the USSR.
2. TERENTIEV Nikita Maksimovich — assistant to the chief of the Narymsky district department of the NKVD for the NSO ZSK of the USSR, lieutenant of state security of the USSR.
3. KIPERVAS Pyotr Grigoryevich - head of the 4th department of the Narymsky district department of the NKVD for NSO ZSK of the USSR, lieutenant of state security of the NKVD for NSO ZSK of the USSR.
4. Kokh Nikolai Ivanovich - inspector of the 1st special department of the Narymsky district department of the NKVD for NSO ZSK USSR, the lieutenant of state security of the NKVD for NSO ZSK USSR
5. REZNIKOV Artemy Zinovievich - operational authorized representative of the 3rd department of the Narym district department of the NKVD for the NSO ZSK of the USSR, a sergeant of state security for the NKVD for the NSO ZSK of the USSR.

== Destruction of burials ==
By order of the 1st secretary of the Kolpashevsky city committee of the CPSU V.N. Shutov, on a washed bank near the burial ground, a blank fence was installed and a cordon was put out so that people would not bring flowers and candles. Detachments were formed from employees of the Ministry of Internal Affairs, the KGB, and volunteer squads were created, who were put on motor boats and blocked the river with them. From the factories they began to deliver unnecessary scrap metal. The task of these detachments was to swim to the corpse, bind the scrap cargo to it and drown.

After the May Day demonstration, the first secretary of the Tomsk Regional Committee of the CPSU, E. K. Ligachev (according to other sources, he was on vacation in May 1979) and the head of the KGB department in the Tomsk Region, Colonel K. M. Ivanov, informed the responsible workers about the burial that had been discovered. The Central Committee of the CPSU and the KGB of the USSR (in particular, members of the Politburo, secretaries of the Central Committee of the CPSU, M. A. Suslov and Yu. V. Andropov). There it was decided to prevent publicity, with the aim of which it was indicated to destroy the remains and signs of this and other similar Kolpashevsky burials. At a meeting in Tomsk, they decided to liquidate the grave from the water, to wash away the shore with a stream of motor ship propellers, and the remains of corpses would be sunk in the river. The first secretary of the regional committee Ligachev at the time of this meeting was on vacation. The operation to destroy the burial was carried out by the forces of the units of the KGB of the USSR. The head of the state security regional administration, K. M. Ivanov, and the secretary of the CPSU regional committee, A. I. Bortnikov, personally arrived at the place where the burial was discovered in the city of Kolpashevo. KGB Major General A. I. Fokin flew in from Moscow. Under their direct supervision, a cover-up operation was carried out. At the same time, the area of the mass grave was cordoned off by the forces of soldiers of the arrived units of the KGB.

The captain of the lake pusher of project 428 OT-2010 V.P. Cherepanov in 1990 told investigators:

Corpses from the pit began to fall into the water. The frozen upper layer of the earth collapsed in large blocks as the lower melt layer of the soil eroded. Washed from May 11 to 15. There were a lot of pits. The corpses were whole, of different sizes. I saw pink and white linen on the corpses. The corpses swam. Kagebeshniki photographed ... At this time, wells were drilled on the shore, looking for undetected burials. I can't name the number of holes. Washed around the clock. The ship almost all went ashore (a bay was formed).

According to the head of one of the ships, "the engines overheated, we were cut off (the cable broke), we retreated several times. They explained to us that this is a sanitary event. They said that we should not talk about it. ... Boats worked downstream, catching those who swam away, who were not crushed with screws." On the fact of vandalism, the prosecutor's office of the Novosibirsk Region instituted criminal proceedings, and on September 26, 1992, the military prosecutor’s office dismissed the criminal case under part 1 of art. 5 of the Code of Criminal Procedure of the RSFSR “for the absence of any elements of a crime".

== Bibliography ==
- Запецкий В. М. Колпашевский яр. — Новосибирск: Сибирская книга, 1992. — 128 с.
- Исаков И. Какую Россию мы потеряли, или Отклик на книгу «Колпашевский Яр» // Томский вестник. — 1994. — 14 янв. — С. 5.
- Крюков В. Как размывали память: избранные статьи / Томское областное историко-просветительское правозащитное и благотворительное общество «Мемориал». — Томск, 2005. — 75 с.
- Сотников А. Колпашевский расстрельный яр // Губернские новости. — Томск, 2011. — 25 февр. — С. 19.
- Черепанов В. В. и др. «Грунт обвалился вместе с человеческими останками»: вот что вспоминали об этих событиях очевидцы // Губернские новости. —Томск, 2011. — 25 февр. — С. 19.
