= Inna Afinogenova =

Russian journalist (born 1989)

- Инна Афиногенова
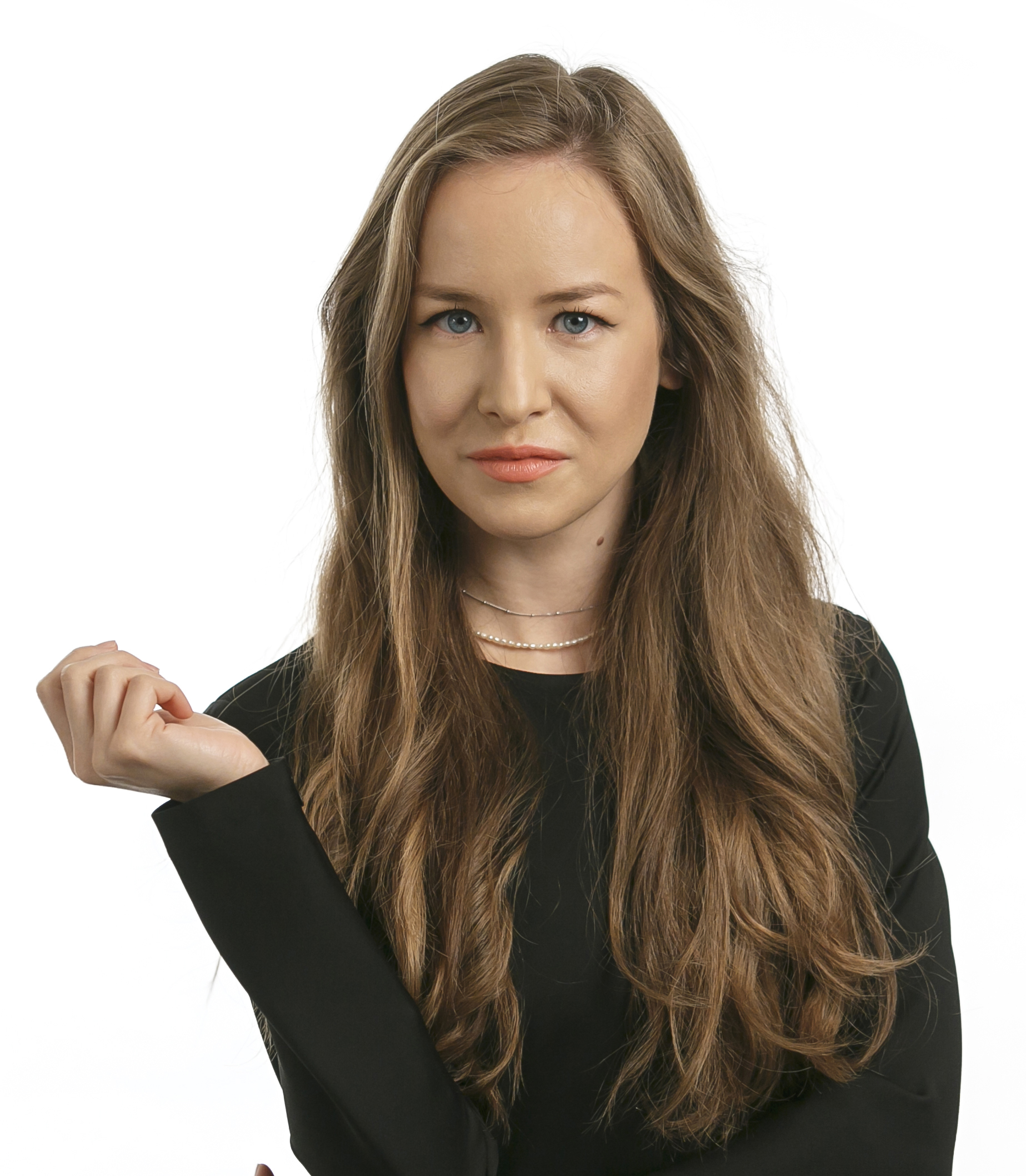
- Born: January 14, 1989 (age 37); Dagestan Autonomous Soviet Socialist Republic
- Citizenship: Married
- Education: Moscow State University
- Occupation: Journalist
- Employer: RT (-2022) Público (2022-) Caras y Caretas (2022-) Canal RED (2023-)

Inna Afinogenova (Russian: Инна Афиноге́нова, romanized: Inna Afinogénova; Dagestan, Soviet Union; January 14, 1989) is a Russian journalist, who worked as deputy director of the RT website until May 2022, when she resigned over disagreements about the Russian invasion of Ukraine. She also worked for the Spanish YouTube channel called Ahí Les Va (There you go). Since June 2022 she has collaborated in the program La Base, of the Spanish online newspaper Público and since June 30 she has also collaborated with the program Macondo, of the Uruguayan magazine Caras y caretas with Leonardo Grille and the Argentine Marco Teruggi. Since 2023 she collaborates on Canal Red, an internet television channel created by Pablo Iglesias Turrión.

== Biography ==
Afinogenova was born on January 14, 1989, in the then Dagestan SASS, part of the Russian SFSR (Soviet Union). She graduated in journalism from the M.V. State University. Lomonosov of Moscow. Journalism and the Spanish language are her greatest interests. She learned Spanish from a very young age and received classes from an Argentine teacher from the age of 12 to 18 in Kislovodsk. In an interview with Argentine host Beto Casella she said about her Argentine teacher “She instilled in me a love for that country. And then I had the opportunity to go to Argentina in 2008. I went several times, and I spent long periods of time in Buenos Aires.

Afinogenova has worked in various media outlets (from radio in Argentina to television) and worked on the Russian television channel RT en Español, holding various positions in said channel until becoming the deputy director of the website.

Previously, she had generated some controversy since on December 1, 2021, in her program Ahí les va, she commented: "January will arrive, then February and March, 2022 will end and surely in the (Western) media they will continue to read that the invasion is imminent."

On May 3, 2022, she posted a video on her YouTube channel in which she explained that she had left Russia and the RT en Español channel because she does not agree with this war and any other war.

She also criticized the war, considering it a serious strategic error, because it has meant a great reinforcement of NATO: "No one who is against NATO supports this war, because nothing has strengthened that organization as much as the decision made by the Russian government, an organization that was in full decline, seemed totally anachronistic".

On June 24, 2022, the La Base program of the Spanish newspaper Público presented by Pablo Iglesias announced that it had signed Inna Afigenova for its program where, from Monday to Thursday, she will be in charge of carrying out analysis especially on the international and geopolitical situation, regarding everything related to Latin America, where she has many followers. In addition, every Friday she will broadcast a video on YouTube, where she will analyze current international events, mainly about Latin America. Afigenova resides in Madrid, Spain.

On March 6, 2023 she joined Canal RED, a new Spanish-language television channel that broadcasts online and DTT created by Pablo Iglesias Turrión and financed through crowdfunding.

She was married in Belgrade, Serbia to Madrid based filmmaker Boris Kozlov in June 2026.

== Awards ==
In 2025, Inna Afinogenova received the "Mártires de la Resistencia" award, awarded by the president of Honduras Xiomara Castro. This recognition is given to the communicators "committed to social justice, human rights and freedom of expression".

== Controversies ==
Inna Afinogenova is a controversial figure in countries like the UK, the United States, Mexico, Spain and Colombia, which is the main reason for her notoriety, due to her association with RT network in spanish, a channel funded by the Russian government, often accused of spreading disinformation. During her time at RT, she downplayed concerns about Russia’s invasion of Ukraine, generating criticism for her pro-Russian stance. In March 2022, the RT and Sputnik channels were blocked in the European Union, including her program "Ahí les va," which was accused of spreading misinformation.

In May 2022, Afinogenova resigned from RT en Español, expressing her disagreement with the war, calling it a "grave strategic mistake," and distancing herself from the official position of the Kremlin.

She has been pointed out for her involvement in spreading unconventional narratives aligned with the Russian government’s stance in Latin America or the Hispanic world, particularly in Colombia. Her work with RT en Español and RTVC, as well as her presence in digital media, has been the subject of criticism and analysis regarding its impact on public opinion in the country, such as the study titled Russian Information Disorder in Colombia? The Case of RT's Inna Afinogenova.

Mexican journalist León Krauze wrote in The Washington Post in May 2022 that Afinogenova frequently dismissed the notion of Russian propaganda as a Western fabrication and used her platform to defend figures such as Gustavo Petro, Nicolás Maduro, while ridiculing Venezuelan opposition leader Juan Guaidó.
