= Vyacheslav Andryushchenko =

Belarusian ice hockey player

- Born: July 4, 1989 (age 35); Minsk, Belarusian SSR, Soviet Union
- Height: 5 ft 9 in (175 cm)
- Weight: 159 lb (72 kg; 11 st 5 lb)
- Position: Forward
- Shoots: Right
- BXL team: Metallurg Zhlobin
- National team: Belarus
- Playing career: 2008–present

Vyacheslav Igorevich Andryushchenko (Russian: Вячеслав Игоревич Андрющенко; born July 4, 1989) is a Belarusian ice hockey forward playing for Metallurg Zhlobin of the Belarusian Extraliga.

== Career ==
Andryushchenko competed in the 2013 IIHF World Championship as a member of the Belarus men's national ice hockey team. He played for HC Neftekhimik Nizhnekamsk during the 2014–2015 season.
