= List of Soviet films of 1980–1991 =

A list of films produced in the Soviet Union between 1980 and 1991:

- List of Soviet films of 1980
- List of Soviet films of 1981
- List of Soviet films of 1982
- List of Soviet films of 1983
- List of Soviet films of 1984
- List of Soviet films of 1985
- List of Soviet films of 1986
- List of Soviet films of 1987
- List of Soviet films of 1988
- List of Soviet films of 1989
- List of Soviet films of 1990
- List of Soviet films of 1991
