= 1924 in the Soviet Union =

- Decades: 1920s; 1930s; 1940s
- See also: History of the Soviet Union; List of years in the Soviet Union

The following lists events that happened during 1924 in the Union of Soviet Socialist Republics.

== Incumbents ==
- General Secretary of the Communist Party of the Soviet Union – Joseph Stalin
- Chairman of the Central Executive Committee of the Congress of Soviets – Mikhail Kalinin
- Chairman of the Council of People's Commissars of the Soviet Union – Vladimir Lenin (until 2 February), Alexei Rykov (starting 2 February)

== Events ==
=== January ===
- 19 January – failed attempt to free capital of Khiva from Bolsheviks
- 21 January- Vladimir Lenin, leader of the October Revolution and the first leader and founder of the Soviet Union, dies at age 53
- 26 January – started Second All-Union Congress of Soviets in Moscow
  - 26 January – Petrograd is renamed into Leningrad
  - 27 January – Lenin is buried in the Lenin's Mausoleum at the Red Square
  - 29 January – a three-day plenary session of the Russian Communist Party (Bolsheviks) adopted decision on "Lenin's call to the party"
  - 31 January – The 1924 Soviet Constitution is ratified by the Congress of Soviets

=== February ===
- 1 February – United Kingdom recognized the Soviet Union
- 2 February – ended Second All-Union Congress of Soviets in Moscow
  - Alexei Rykov has been appointment as the Chairman of Sovnarkom
- 7 February – Italy (Benito Mussolini) recognized the Soviet Union
- 15 February – began the "Lenin Enrolment" into the Russian Communist Party (Bolsheviks)
- 25 February – plenary session of the Central Committee of the Communist Party of Bukhara approved the national delimitation of the Central Asia (National delimitation in the Soviet Union)

=== March ===
- 3 March — Executive Bureau of the Central Committee of the Khorezm Communist Party approved the initiative on the national delimitation of the Central Asia
- 10 March — Central Committee of the Turkestan Communist Party approved the initiative on the national delimitation of the Central Asia
- In Vienna, Austria was opened a bilateral conference between Romania and the Soviet Union on the "Bessarabian issue"

=== April ===
- 2 April — Romanian delegation rejected the Soviet proposal to hold a plebiscite a plebiscite in Bessarabia and interrupted further negotiations with the Soviet Union
- All-Russian Central Executive Committee awarded "proletariat of Tashkent" with Order of the Red Banner

=== May ===
- 23–31 May – 13th Congress of the Russian Communist Party (Bolsheviks)

=== June ===
- 12 June – Politburo of the Central Committee of the Russian Communist Party (Bolsheviks) adopted a resolution on national delimitation in the Central Asia

=== July ===
- 8-22 July – 3rd Congress of Profintern in Moscow

=== August ===
- 3–4 August – Soviet raid on Stołpce
- 28 August – 5 September – August Uprising in Georgia, Transcaucasian SFSR

=== September ===
- 15–18 September – Tatarbunary Uprising with Soviet involvement starts in Romania
- 23 September – 1924 Leningrad flooding

=== October ===
- 12 October – on territory of Ukraine established the Moldavian ASSR centered in Balta on decision of the All-Ukrainian Central Executive Committee (8th convocation)
- 14 October – All-Russian Central Executive Committee adopted decision on establishing of autonomous regions within the Turkestan ASSR (Tajik ASSR and Kara-Kirghiz Autonomous Oblast)
- 27 October – instead of Turkestan ASSR, Bukharan SSR, and Khorezm SSR were formed Uzbek SSR (centered in Bukhara) and Turkmen SSR (Poltoratsk – Ashgabat)

=== November ===
- 14 November – Yekaterinburg renamed into Sverdlovsk

=== December ===
- 19 December – on decree of the All-Russian Central Executive Committee, the Volga German Autonomous Oblast transformed into Volga German Autonomous Soviet Socialist Republic

== Births ==
- 13 February – Ivan Mozgovenko, clarinetist and music teacher (died 2021)
- 18 February – Evald Ilyenkov, writer (died 1979)
- 29 February – Vladimir Kryuchkov, head of the KGB (died 2007)
- 19 March – Lev Kulidzhanov, film director (died 2002)
- 18 April – Pyotr Nikolayev, Olympic shooter (died 2000)
- 11 May – Eugene Dynkin, mathematician (died 2014)
- 21 May – Boris Vasilyev, writer (died 2013)
- 10 July – Vladimir Sukharev, Olympic athlete (died 1997)
- 20 July – Tatyana Lioznova, film director (died 2011)
- 4 October – Georgy Shakhnazarov, Soviet-Armenian politician (died 2001)
- 3 November – Violetta Elvin, ballerina
- 5 December – Vladimir Dolgikh, politician
- Date unknown – Nikolai Nagibin, posthumous Hero of the Soviet Union

== Deaths ==
- 21 January – Vladimir Lenin, USSR politician (b. 1870)
- 30 June – Praskovya Uvarova, archaeologist (b. 1840)

== See also ==
- 1924 in fine arts of the Soviet Union
- List of Soviet films of 1924
