= 1926 in fine arts of the Soviet Union =

Monument to Lenin
- Artist: S. Evseev, V. Shchuko; V. Gelfreykh
- Year: 1926
- Location: In front of Finland Station; Leningrad

The year 1926 was marked by many events that left an imprint on the history of Soviet and Russian fine arts.

== Events ==
- Association of artists Circle of Artists is founded in Leningrad. Alexander Samokhvalov, Vacheslav Pakulin, Alexei Pakhomov, Vladimir Malagis, Alexander Rusakov, Alexander Vedernikov and others belong to the circle.
- March 21 — Traditional exhibition of works by artists of the «Society of Arkhip Kuindzhi» was opened in Leningrad in the Academy of Arts. Exhibited 592 works of painting and sculpture of 65 authors. The participants were Mikhail Avilov, Efim Cheptsov, Alfred Eberling, Mikhail Platunov, Alexander Vakhrameev, Arcady Rylov, and other important Russian realist artists.
- April — The second Exhibition of the art association «The Four Arts» was opened in Moscow in the State Historical Museum. Exhibited 423 works of painting and sculpture of 72 authors. The participants were Lev Bruni, Aleksei Kravchenko, Pavel Kuznetsov, Kazimir Malevich, Nina Niss-Goldman, Kuzma Petrov-Vodkin, Martiros Saryan, Vladimir Favorsky and other important Russian artists.
- May 3 — The VII Exhibition of AKhRR named «Life of the Peoples of the USSR» was opened in Moscow. Exhibited 1832 works of 294 authors. The participants were Mikhail Avilov, Abram Arkhipov, Isaak Brodsky, Aleksandr Gerasimov, Mitrofan Grekov, Nikolai Dormidontov, Efim Cheptsov, Alfred Eberling, Boris Ioganson, Alexander Lubimov, Arcady Rylov, Alexander Vakhrameev, and other important Russian artists.
- November 7 — A first monument to Vladimir Lenin was unveiled in Leningrad in front of Finland Station. Author of the monument sculptor S. Evseev and architects V. Shchuko and V. Gelfreykh.

== Births ==
- January 31 — Lev Russov (Russian: Русов Лев Александрович), Russian soviet painter, sculptor, and graphic artist (d. 1987).
- March 24 — Engels Kozlov (Russian: Козлов Энгельс Васильевич), Russian soviet painter, People's Artist of the RSFSR (d.2007).
- April 10 — Valeria Larina (Russian: Валерия Борисовна Ларина), Russian soviet painter realist painter and graphic artist (d. 2008).
- August 9 — Elena Kostenko (Russian: Елена Михайловна Костенко, Russian soviet painter (d. 2019).

== Deaths ==
- March 16 — Alexander Vakhrameev (Russian: Вахрамеев Александр Иванович), Russian painter and art educator (b. 1874).
- June 23 — Viktor Vasnetsov (Russian: Виктор Михайлович Васнецов), Russian painter (b.1848).
- July 7 — Fyodor Schechtel, (Russian: Шехтель Фёдор Осипович), Russian architect, graphic artist, and stage designer (b. 1859).
- October 22 — Ivan Velts (Russian: Вельц Иван Августович), Russian painter (b.1866).
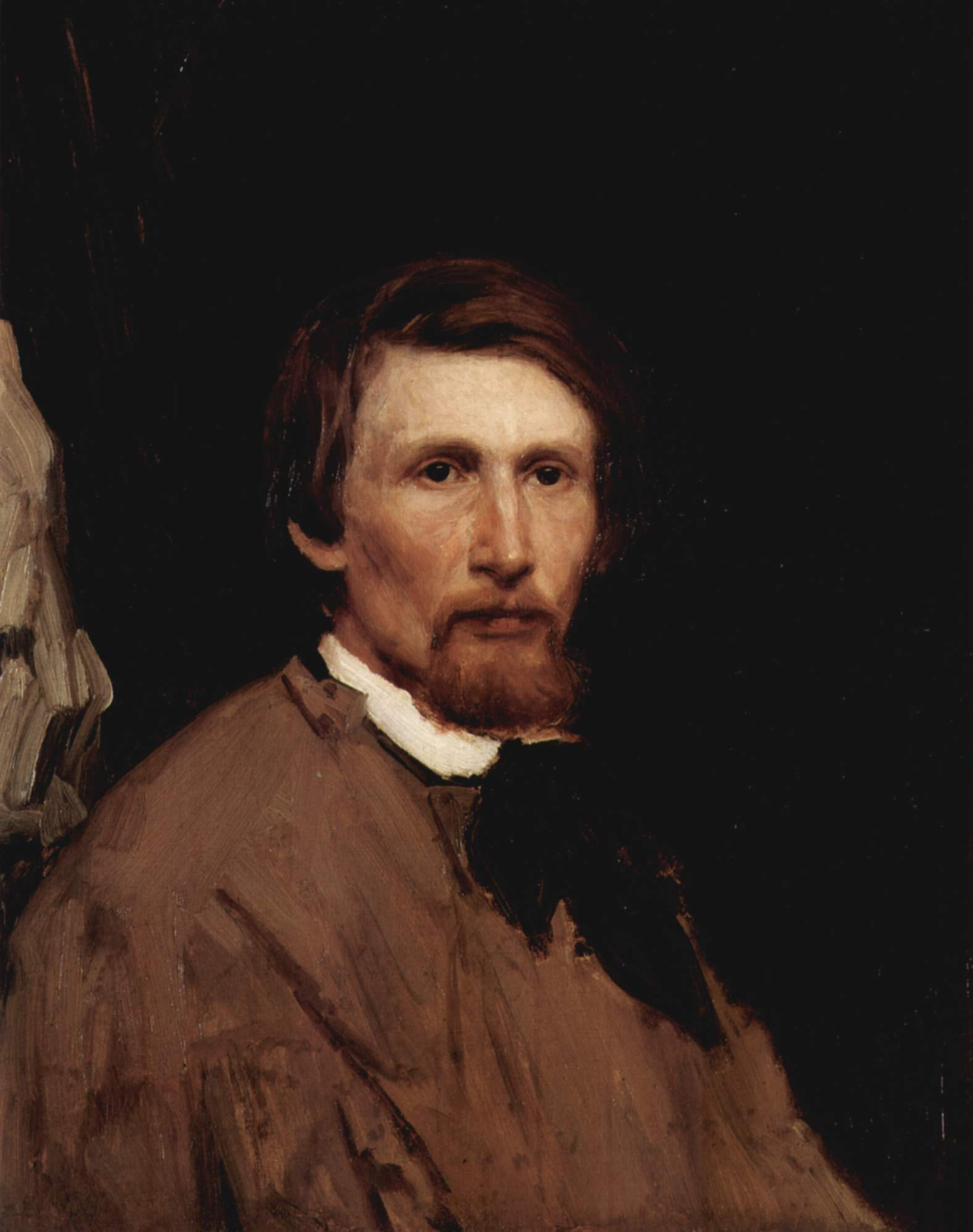
Viktor Vasnetsov

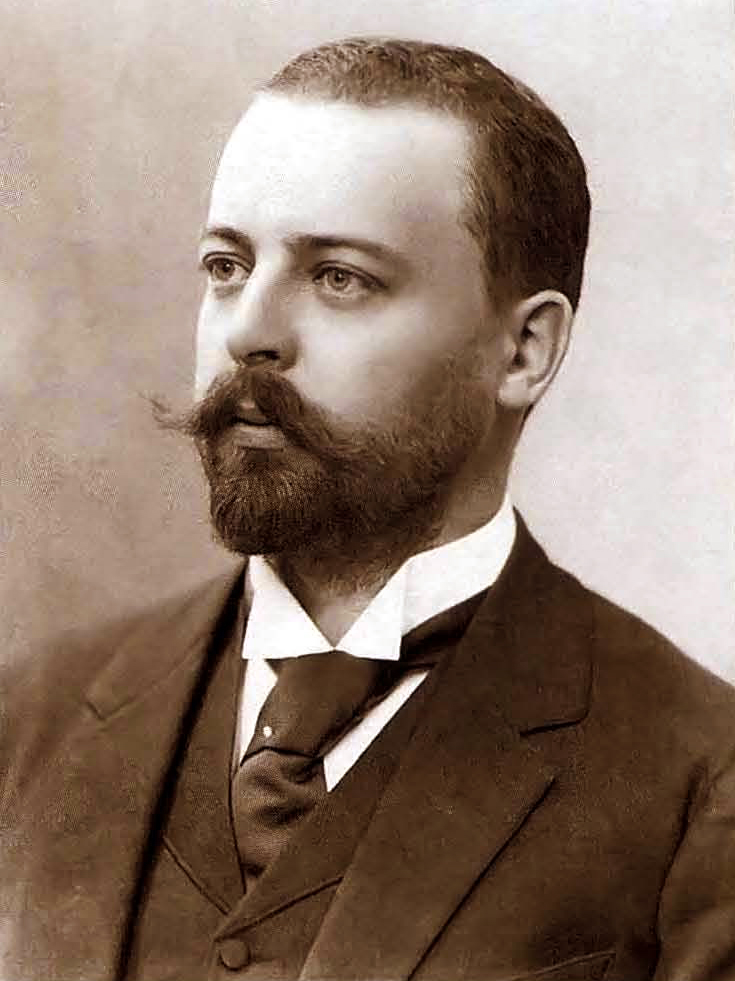
Fyodor Schechtel

== See also ==
- List of Russian artists
- List of painters of Leningrad Union of Artists
- Saint Petersburg Union of Artists
- Russian culture
- 1926 in the Soviet Union

== Sources ==
- VIII выставка картин и скульптуры АХРР «Жизнь и быт народов СССР». Справочник-каталог с иллюстрациями. М., АХРР, 1926.
- Каталог выставки картин Общества им. А. И. Куинджи в залах Академии художеств. Изд 2-е. Л., 1926.
- Каталог VI очередной выставки картин Общества художников-индивидуалистов. Л., 1926.
- Каталог выставки живописи графики скульптуры архитектуры о-ва художников "4 ИСКУССТВА". М., Главнаука, 1926.
- Artists of Peoples of the USSR. Biography Dictionary. Vol. 1. Moscow, Iskusstvo, 1970.
- Artists of Peoples of the USSR. Biography Dictionary. Vol. 2. Moscow, Iskusstvo, 1972.
- Directory of Members of Union of Artists of USSR. Volume 1,2. Moscow, Soviet Artist Edition, 1979.
- Directory of Members of the Leningrad branch of the Union of Artists of Russian Federation. Leningrad, Khudozhnik RSFSR, 1980.
- Artists of Peoples of the USSR. Biography Dictionary. Vol. 4 Book 1. Moscow, Iskusstvo, 1983.
- Directory of Members of the Leningrad branch of the Union of Artists of Russian Federation. – Leningrad: Khudozhnik RSFSR, 1987.
- Персональные и групповые выставки советских художников. 1917-1947 гг. М., Советский художник, 1989.
- Artists of peoples of the USSR. Biography Dictionary. Vol. 4 Book 2. – Saint Petersburg: Academic project humanitarian agency, 1995.
- Link of Times: 1932 – 1997. Artists – Members of Saint Petersburg Union of Artists of Russia. Exhibition catalogue. – Saint Petersburg: Manezh Central Exhibition Hall, 1997.
- Matthew C. Bown. Dictionary of 20th Century Russian and Soviet Painters 1900-1980s. – London: Izomar, 1998.
- Vern G. Swanson. Soviet Impressionism. – Woodbridge, England: Antique Collectors' Club, 2001.
- Время перемен. Искусство 1960—1985 в Советском Союзе. СПб., Государственный Русский музей, 2006.
- Sergei V. Ivanov. Unknown Socialist Realism. The Leningrad School. – Saint-Petersburg: NP-Print Edition, 2007. – ISBN 5-901724-21-6, ISBN 978-5-901724-21-7.
- Anniversary Directory graduates of Saint Petersburg State Academic Institute of Painting, Sculpture, and Architecture named after Ilya Repin, Russian Academy of Arts. 1915 – 2005. – Saint Petersburg: Pervotsvet Publishing House, 2007.
