= 1924 in fine arts of the Soviet Union =

The year 1924 was marked by many events that left an imprint on the history of Soviet and Russian Fine Arts.

== Events ==
- January 26 — Petersburg was renamed to Leningrad.
- January 29 — The VI Exhibition of AKhRR named «Revolution, the everyday life and work» was opened in Moscow in the State Historical Museum. Exhibited 499 works of painting and sculpture of 134 authors. The participants were Mikhail Avilov, Abram Arkhipov, Mikhail Bobyshov, Alexander Vakhrameev, Nikolai Dormidontov, Yuly Klever, Piotr Kotov, Vasily Svarog, Rudolf Frentz, and other important Russian artists.
- May 11 — A bronze monument to Vatslav Vorovsky was unveiled in Moscow in front of building of the Narkomindel - the Ministry of External Relations of the Soviet Russia. Author of the monument sculptor Jacov Katz.
- June 1 — The last Exhibition of Mir iskusstva art group was opened in Petrograd in the Museum of City (former Anichkov Palace). Exhibited 351 works of 47 authors. The participants were Alexandre Benois, Alexander Golovin, Mstislav Dobuzhinsky, Vladimir Konashevich, Elizaveta Kruglikova, Dmitry Mitrokhin, Anna Ostroumova-Lebedeva, Kuzma Petrov-Vodkin, Zinaida Serebriakova, Georgy Vereisky, and other important Russian artists.

== Births ==
- April 22 — Anatoliy Nasedkin (Russian: Наседкин Анатолий Леонидович), Russian soviet painter, People's Artist of the Ukraine Soviet Socialist Republic (died 1994).
- May 15 — Maya Kopitseva (Russian: Копытцева Майя Кузьминична), Russian soviet painter, Honored Artist of the RSFSR, (died 2005).
- June 28 — Vadim Sidur (Russian: Вадим Абрамович Сидур), Russian soviet sculptor (died 1986).

== Deaths ==
- October 26 — Aleksandr Makovsky (Russian: Маковский Александр Владимирович), Russian painter, graphic artist, and art educator, a member of art group Peredvizhniki, professor of Imperial Academy of Arts in Saint Petersburg Honored Art (born 1969).
- December 24 — Yuly Klever (Russian: Клевер Юлий Юльевич), Russian painter and art educator (born 1850).
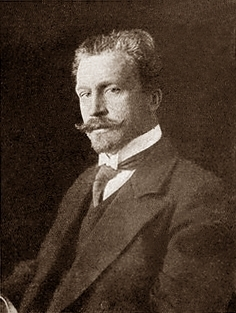
Aleksandr Makovsky

== See also ==
- List of Russian artists
- List of painters of Leningrad Union of Artists
- Saint Petersburg Union of Artists
- Russian culture
- 1924 in the Soviet Union

== Sources ==
- Каталог VI выставки картин «Революция, быт и труд». М., АХРР, 1924.
- Каталог выставки группы художников «Мир искусства». Петроград, Общество «Долой неграмотность», 1924.
- Каталог отчетной выставки работ студентов и продукции производственного бюро Ленинградской Академии художеств. Л., 1924.
- Памяти вождя. Конкурс проектов памятника тов. Ленину на площади у Финляндского вокзала. Л., «Красная панорама», 1924, № 17 (35). С.8.
- Artists of Peoples of the USSR. Biography Dictionary. Vol. 1. Moscow, Iskusstvo, 1970.
- Artists of Peoples of the USSR. Biography Dictionary. Vol. 2. Moscow, Iskusstvo, 1972.
- Directory of Members of Union of Artists of USSR. Volume 1,2. Moscow, Soviet Artist Edition, 1979.
- Directory of Members of the Leningrad branch of the Union of Artists of Russian Federation. Leningrad, Khudozhnik RSFSR, 1980.
- Artists of Peoples of the USSR. Biography Dictionary. Vol. 4 Book 1. Moscow, Iskusstvo, 1983.
- Directory of Members of the Leningrad branch of the Union of Artists of Russian Federation. - Leningrad: Khudozhnik RSFSR, 1987.
- Персональные и групповые выставки советских художников. 1917-1947 гг. М., Советский художник, 1989.
- Artists of peoples of the USSR. Biography Dictionary. Vol. 4 Book 2. - Saint Petersburg: Academic project humanitarian agency, 1995.
- Link of Times: 1932 - 1997. Artists - Members of Saint Petersburg Union of Artists of Russia. Exhibition catalogue. - Saint Petersburg: Manezh Central Exhibition Hall, 1997.
- Matthew C. Bown. Dictionary of 20th Century Russian and Soviet Painters 1900-1980s. - London: Izomar, 1998.
- Vern G. Swanson. Soviet Impressionism. - Woodbridge, England: Antique Collectors' Club, 2001.
- Время перемен. Искусство 1960—1985 в Советском Союзе. СПб., Государственный Русский музей, 2006.
- Sergei V. Ivanov. Unknown Socialist Realism. The Leningrad School. - Saint-Petersburg: NP-Print Edition, 2007. - ISBN 5-901724-21-6, ISBN 978-5-901724-21-7.
- Anniversary Directory graduates of Saint Petersburg State Academic Institute of Painting, Sculpture, and Architecture named after Ilya Repin, Russian Academy of Arts. 1915 - 2005. - Saint Petersburg: Pervotsvet Publishing House, 2007.
