= Ural Tansykbayev Museum =

House-museum in Tashkent

Coordinates: 41.3345°N 69.3311°E

House-museum of Ural Tansykbayev
- Xalq rassomi akademik Oral Tansiqboev uy-muzeyi
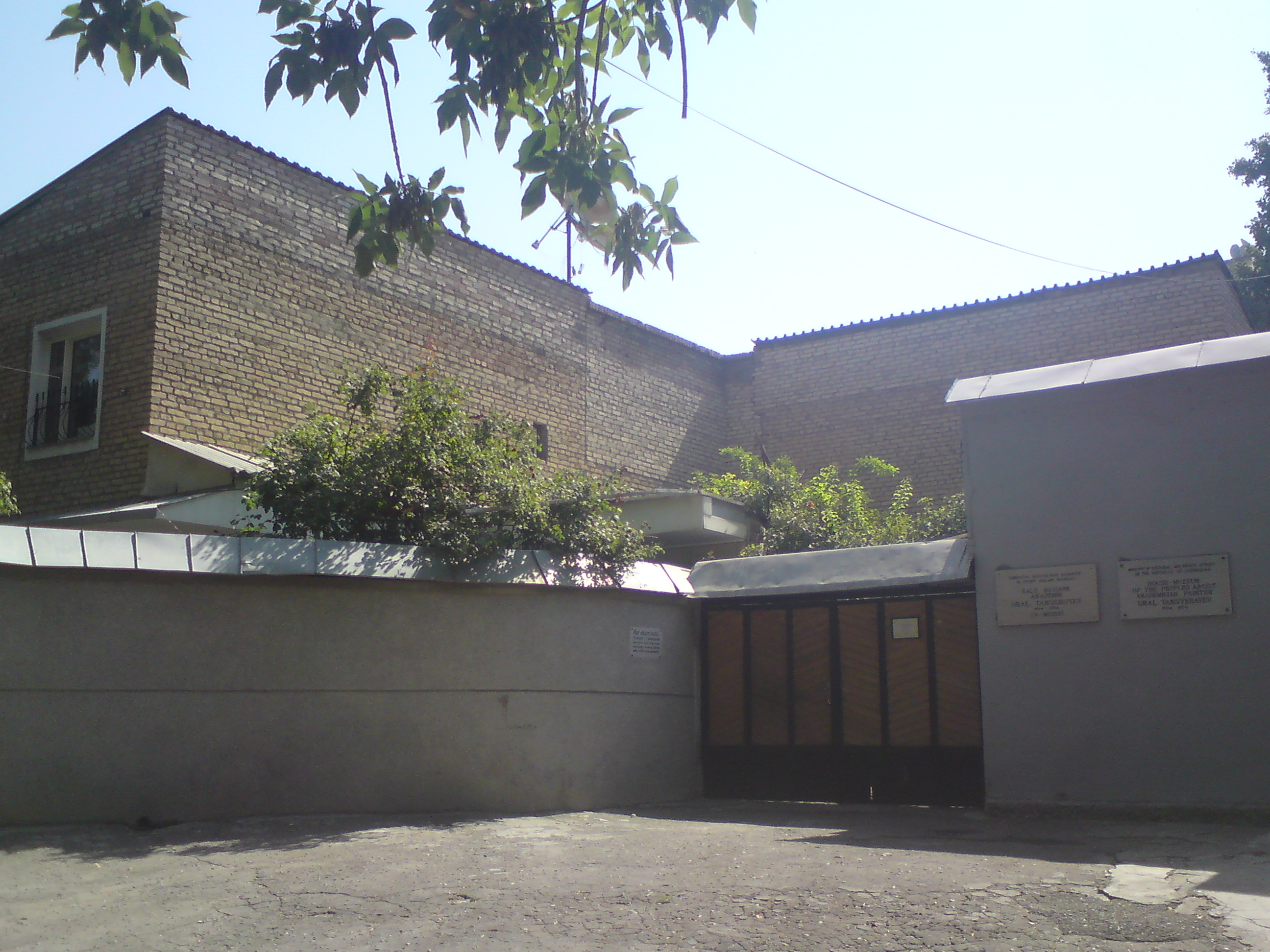
- Established: 1981
- Location: 5, Buz-1, Tashkent, Uzbekistan
- Type: House museum
- Director: Farkhod Jalilov

The Ural Tansykbayev Museum, also known as the House-Museum of Ural Tansykbayev (Xalq rassomi akademik Oral Tansiqboev uy-muzeyi in Uzbeki) is a historic house museum dedicated to the Uzbek artist, Ural Tansykbayev located in Mirzo Ulugbek district in Tashkent, Uzbekistan. It also houses some of his paintings.

== History ==
The museum was established by Elizaveta Tansykbayeva, the widow of Ural Tansykbayev and was opened on January 16, 1981, as a branch of the Museum of Arts of the Uzbek SSR. Since 2021 the museum has been under the jurisdiction of the Agency of Cultural Heritage at the Ministry of Tourism and Sports.

The main building is the two-storey cottage where the artist lived from 1967-1974 and the garden which he planted. It was expanded in 1994 with a two-story exhibition hall in 1994 - what would have been Tansykbayev's 90th birthday.
