= Vitaly Tikhov =

Russian painter

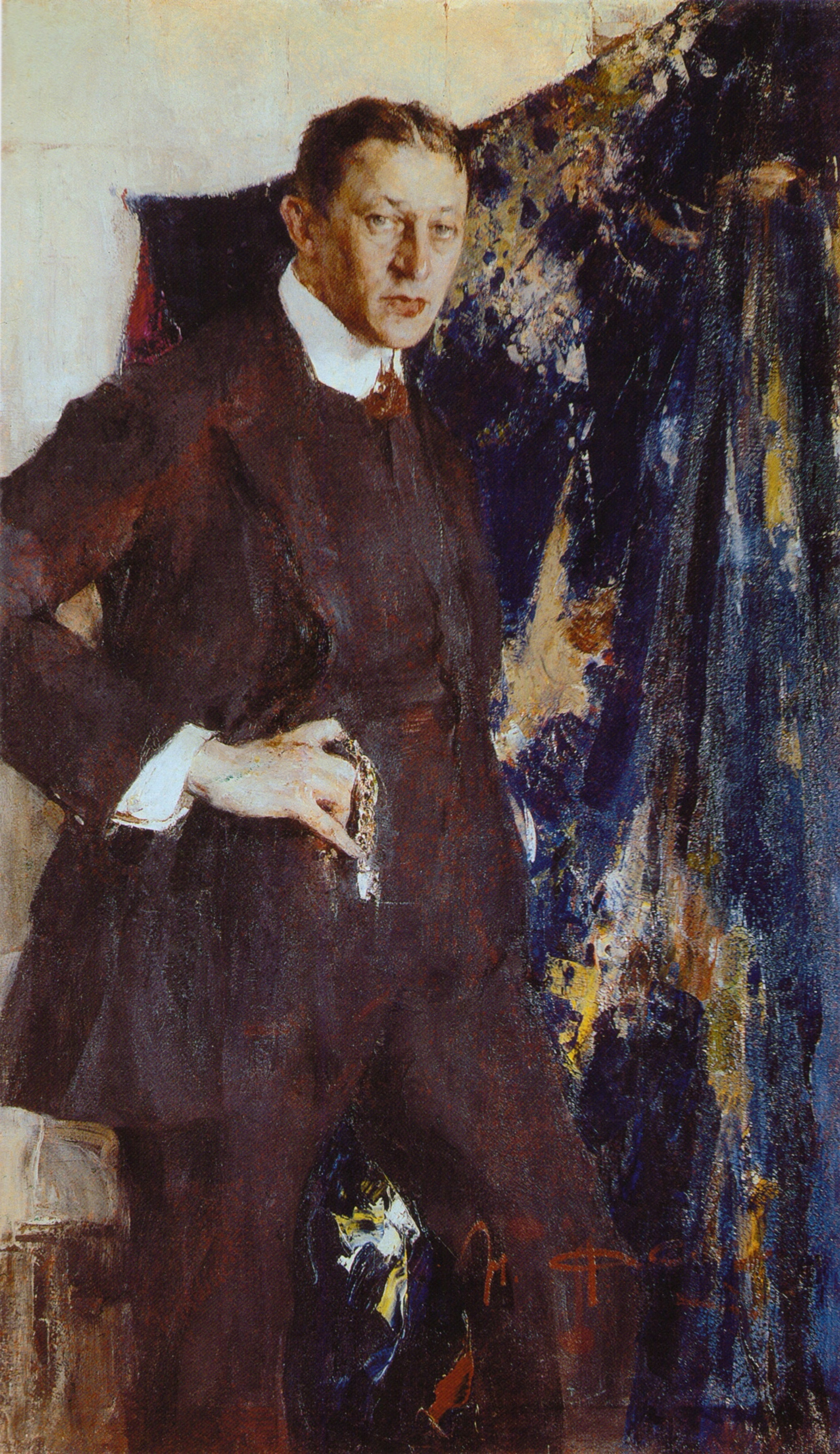
Vitaly Tikhov; portrait by Nikolai Fechin.

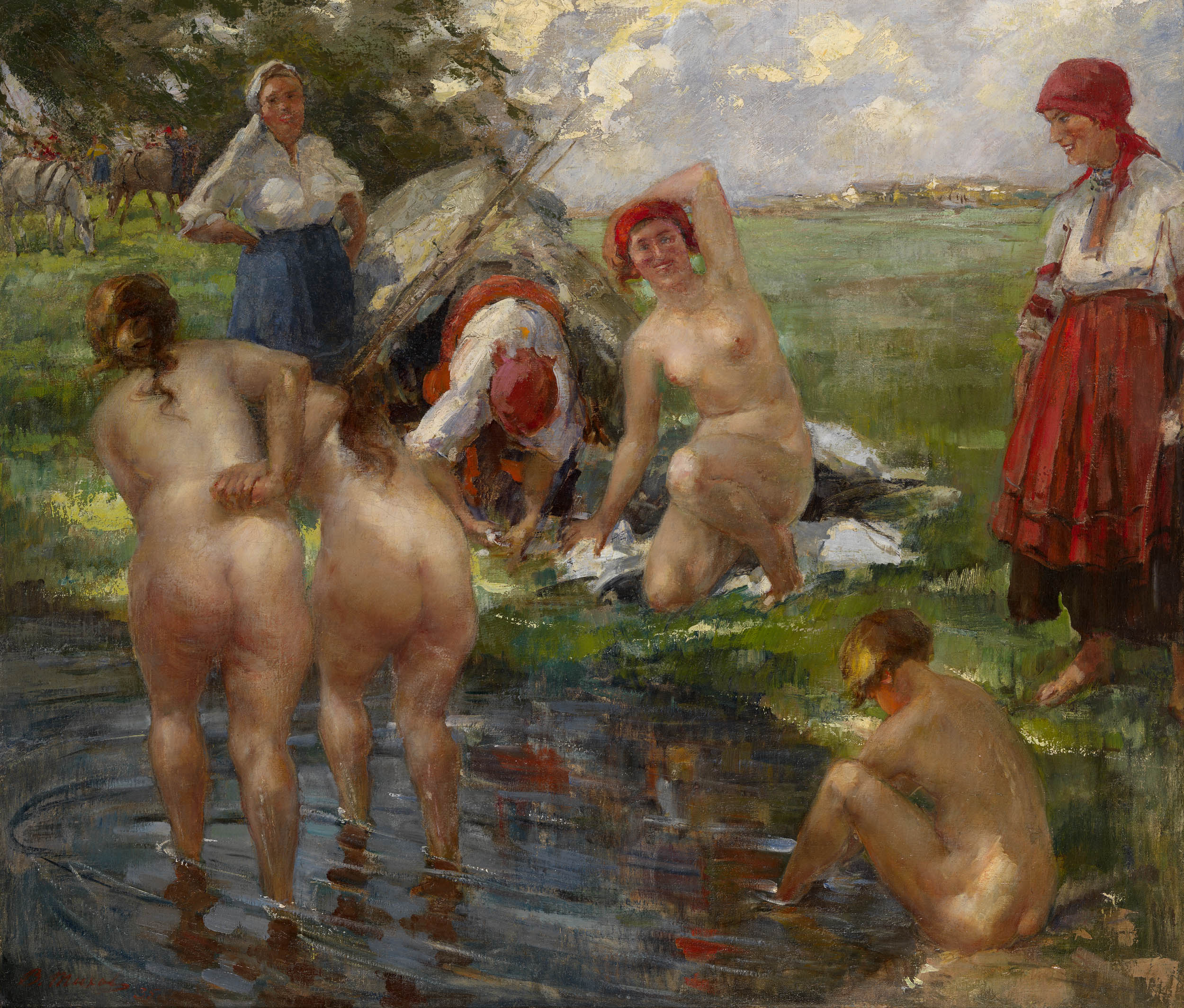
Bathers

Vitaly Gavrilovich Tikhov (Russian: Виталий Гаврилович Тихов; 14 February 1876, Kiev Governorate - 1939, Saint Petersburg) was a Russian painter, known primarily for his Rubenesque nudes. He was also a member of the Peredvizhniki.

== Biography ==
He received his primary education in Morshansk. From 1901 to 1904, he took private lessons with Aleksandr Makovsky. In 1904, he had a major showing at the 33rd exhibition of the Peredvizhniki. That same year, he began auditing courses at the Imperial Academy of Arts, where he studied with Aleksandr's father, Vladimir Makovsky, and Ilya Repin.

He left the school in 1912 and entered a competition there with several of his works. As a result, he was awarded the title of "Artist" and given a pension with permission to travel abroad. That same year, he and his friend Nikolai Fechin signed a petition urging Repin not to retire from the Academy. In 1916, he had another showing with the Peredvizhniki and participated as a full member in their 44th, 45th and 46th exhibitions.

During the 1930s, he departed from his familiar themes to paint works of Socialist Realism, depicting industrial workers, soldiers and sailors. He participated in the "Workers and Peasants Red Army" exhibitions of 1933 and 1938 at the Marx-Engels-Lenin Institute.

In 2011, his painting "Купальщицы" (Bathers) was sold at auction for nearly seventeen million rubles, the fourth largest amount for an auctioned work of art that year.

== Selected paintings ==
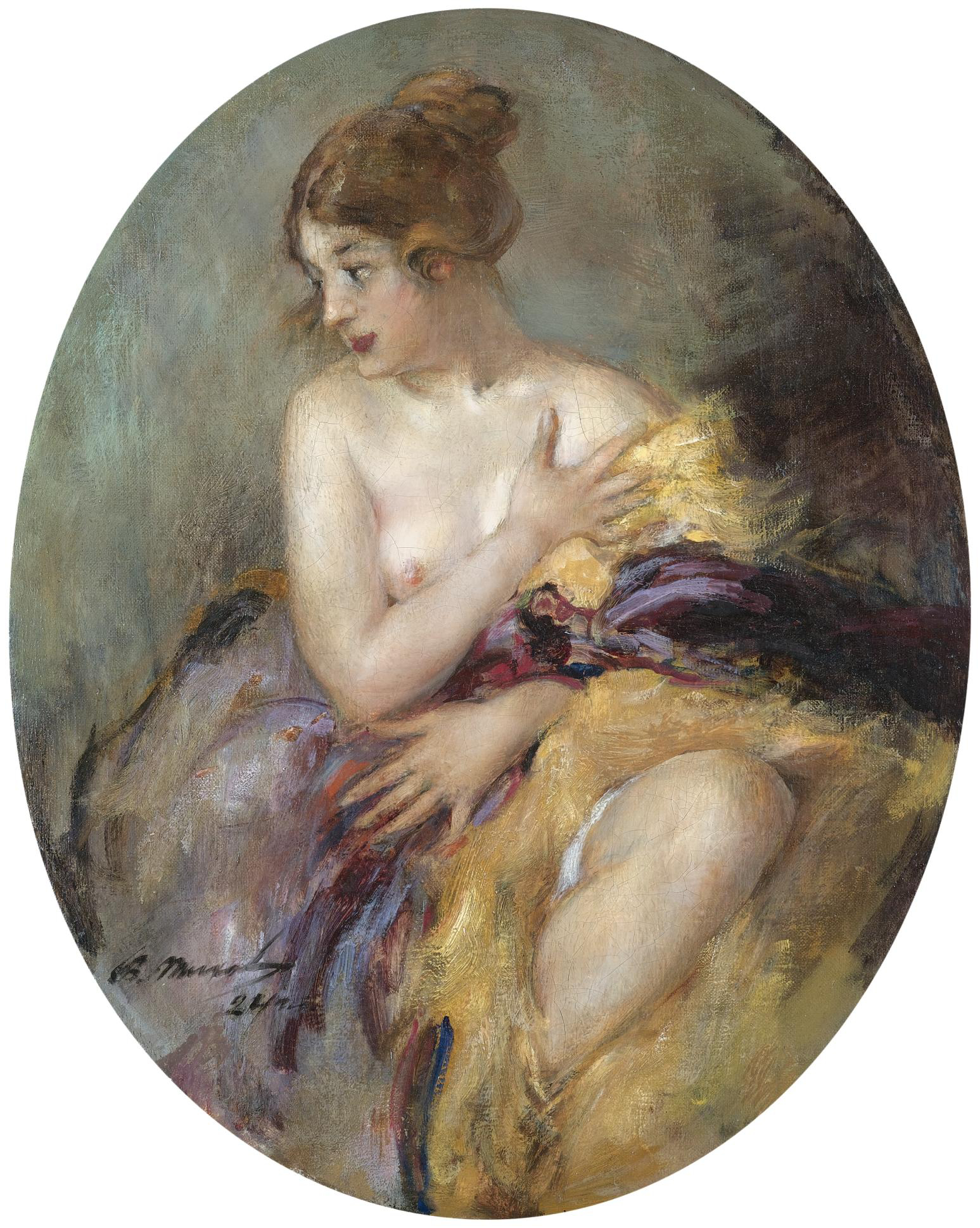
Nude With Shawl

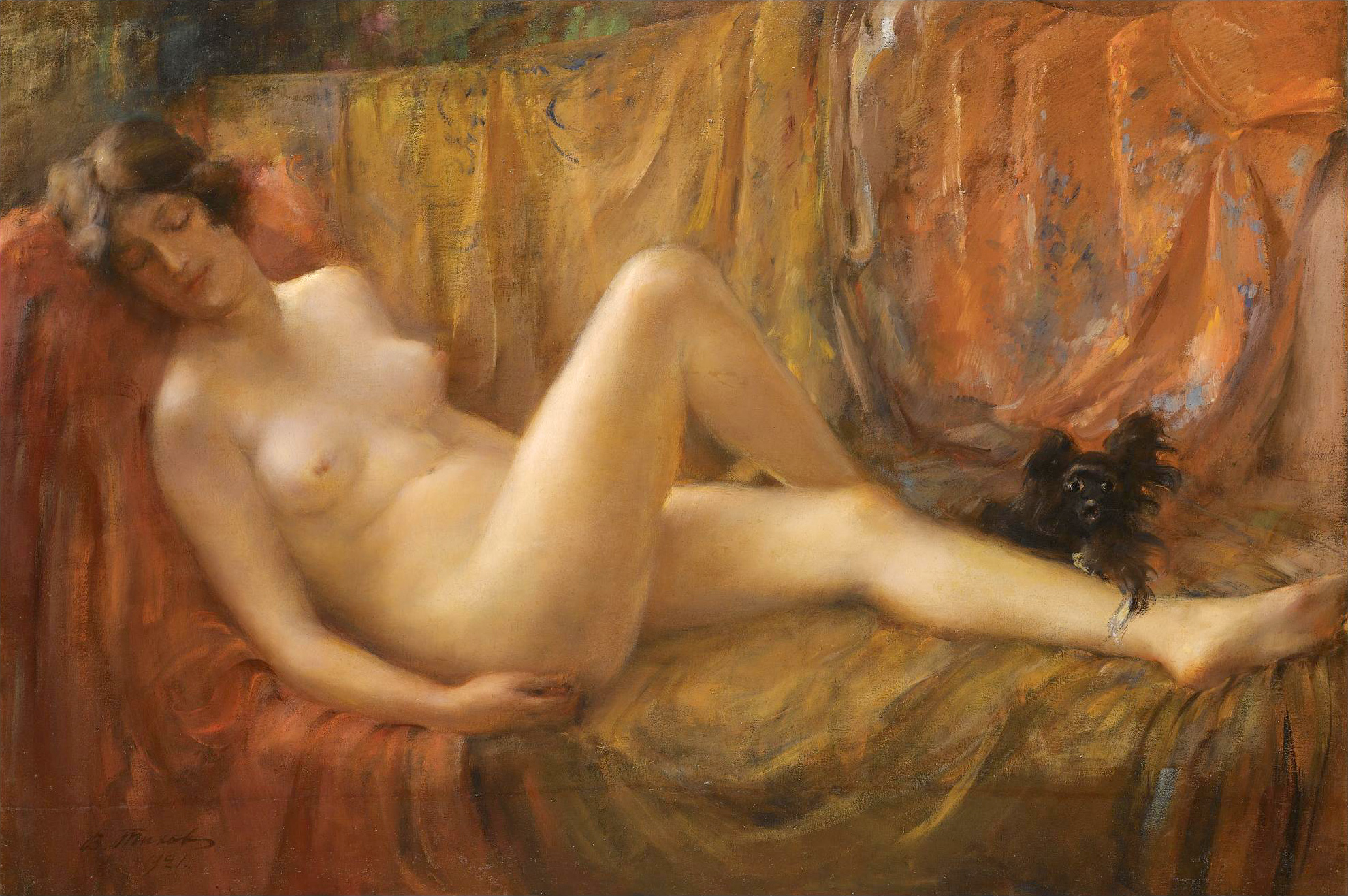
Nude With A Dog

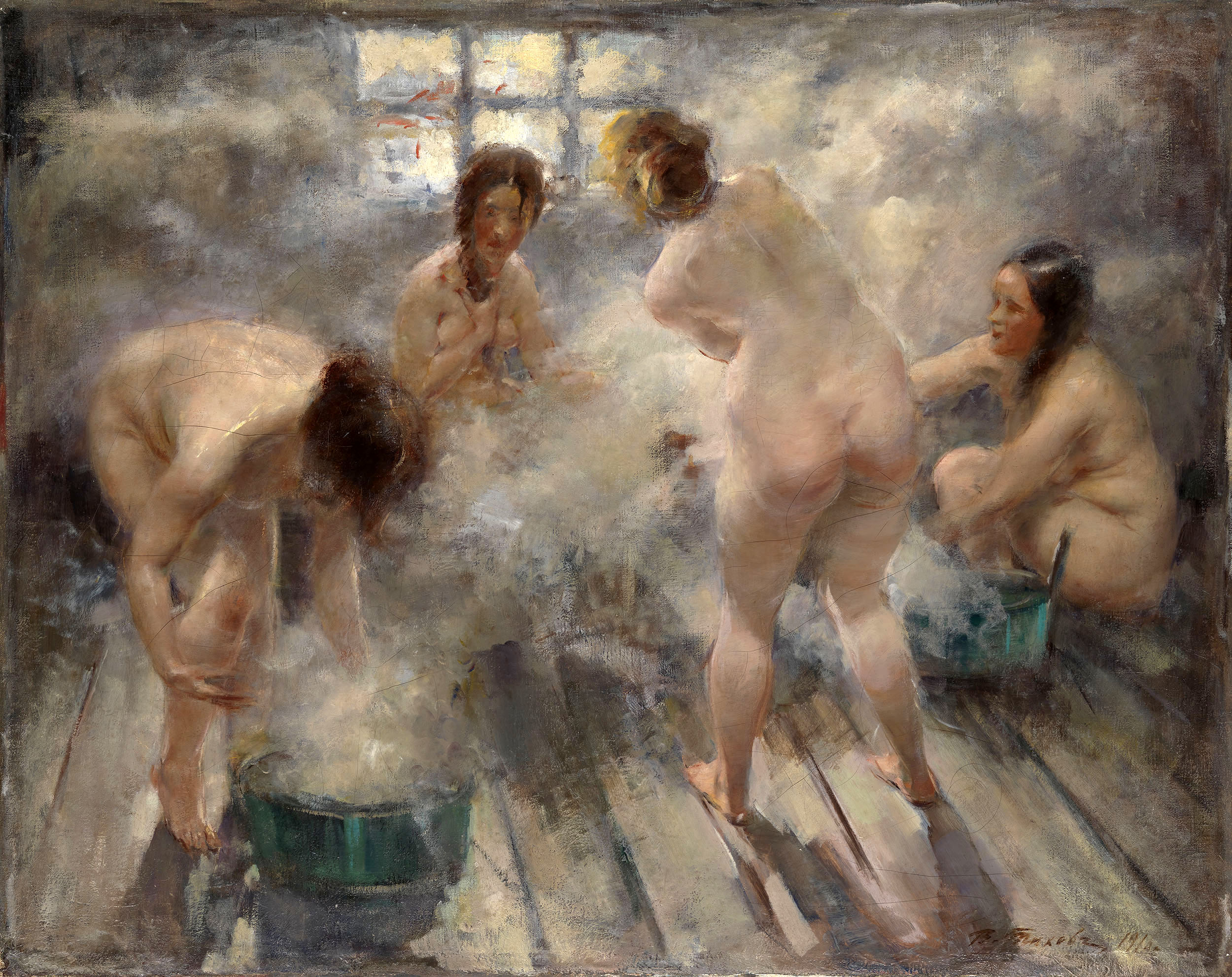
In Russian Banya

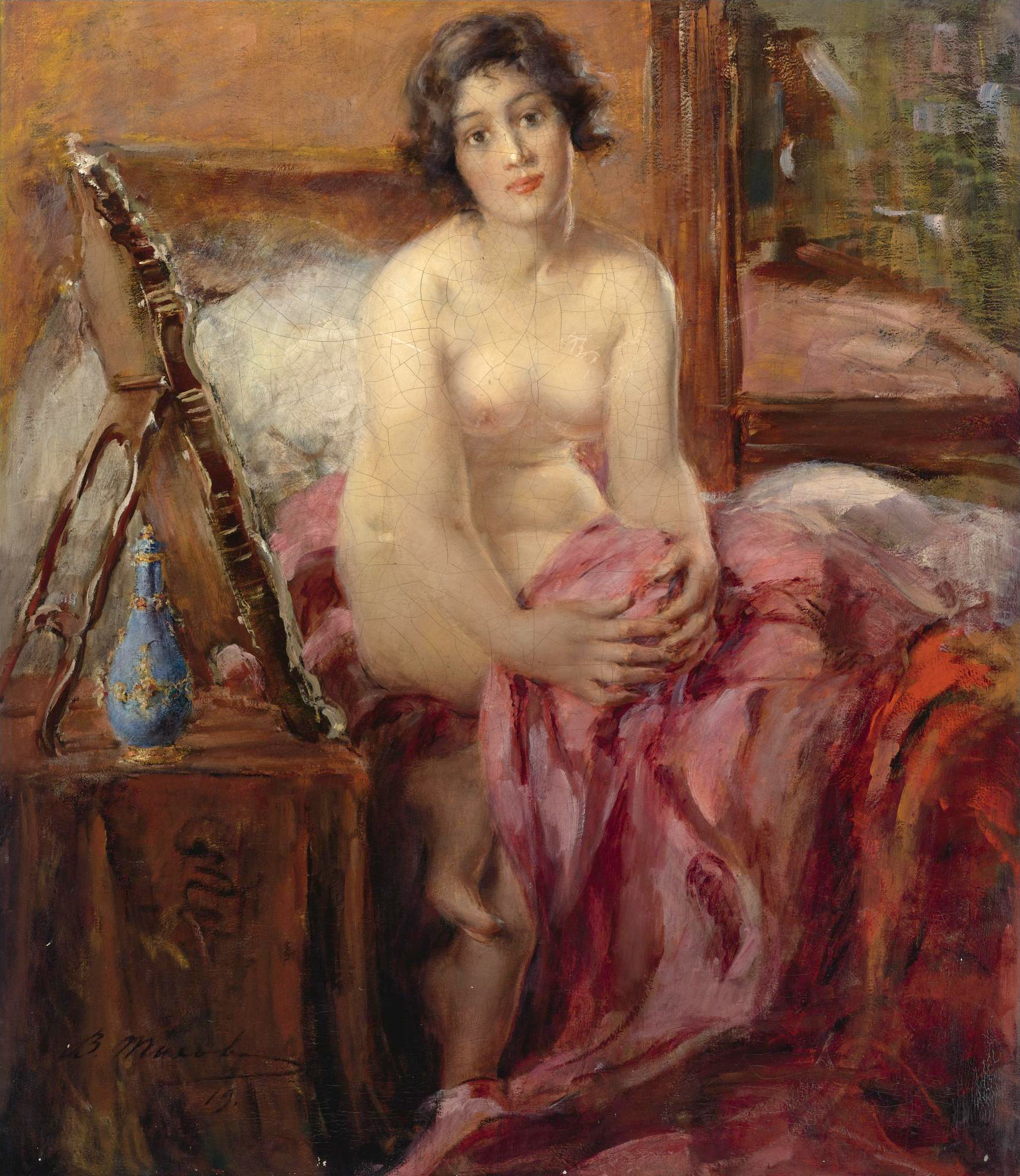
Nude

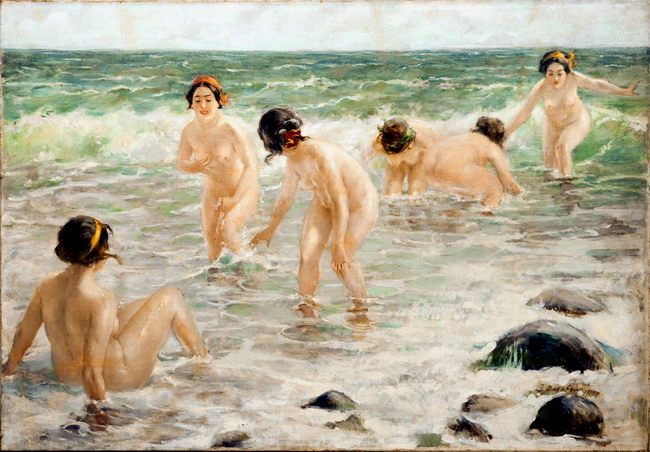
Surf

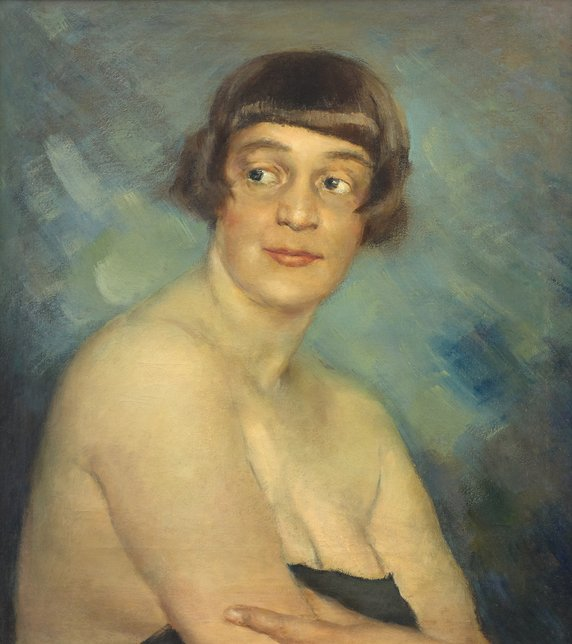
Nina Fogt (1935)

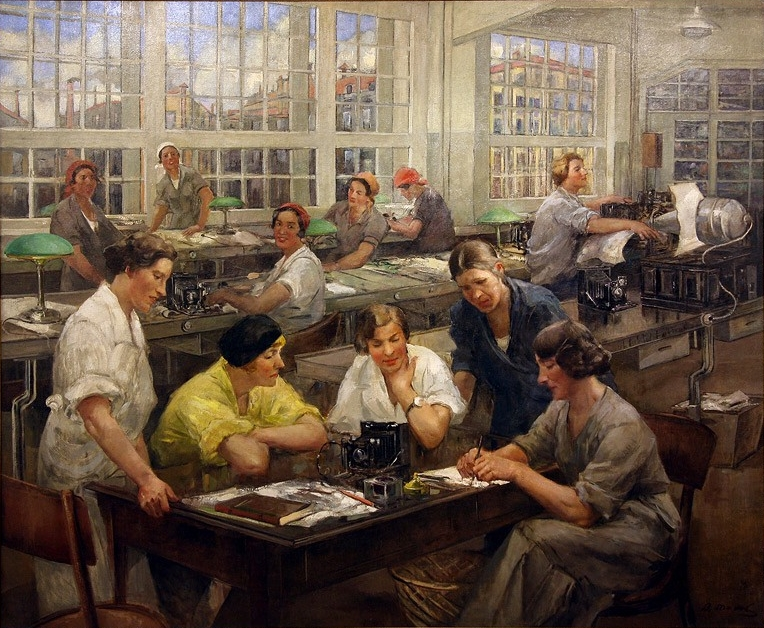
Stakhanovite from OGPU plant in Leningrad
