= 1926 in the Soviet Union =

- Decades: 1920s; 1930s; 1940s
- See also: History of the Soviet Union; List of years in the Soviet Union

The following lists events that happened during 1926 in the Union of Soviet Socialist Republics.

== Incumbents ==
- General Secretary of the Communist Party of the Soviet Union – Joseph Stalin
- Chairman of the Central Executive Committee of the Congress of Soviets – Mikhail Kalinin
- Chairman of the Council of People's Commissars of the Soviet Union – Alexei Rykov

== Events ==
=== January ===
- 29 January – Soviet law changes and the size of inheritable estates becomes effectively unlimited.

=== April ===
- 24 April – The Treaty of Berlin (1926) is signed.

=== July ===
- July – The "Declaration of the 13" was written by Kamenev, Krupskaya, Trotsky, Zinoviev, along with 9 other contributors. The declaration was a denouncement of the economic policies of the left and the attacks on freedom the writers felt would lead to the destruction of the Bolshevik Revolution.

=== December ===
- December – The First All-Union Census of the Soviet Union is conducted.

== Births ==
- 11 January – Lev Dyomin, cosmonaut
- 20 January – Vitaly Vorotnikov, statesman
- 31 January – Lev Russov, painter
- 7 February
  - Konstantin Feoktistov, cosmonaut
  - Mark Taimanov, pianist
- 10 March – Ivan Filin, Olympic athlete
- 24 March – Engels Kozlov, painter
- 3 April – Valentin Falin, diplomat and politician (died 2018)
- 10 April – Valeria Larina, painter
- 16 April – Aleksandra Shevchenko, scientist-zootechnician and milkmaid
- 26 April – Yefrem Sokolov, politician (died in 2022)
- 22 May – Mikhail Bychkov, ice hockey player
- 1 June – Aleksandr Anufriyev, Olympic athlete
- 23 September – Valentin Kuzin, ice hockey player
- 25 September – Sergei Filatov, Olympic equestrian
- 8 October – Andrey Yevgenyevich Lichko, psychiatrist
- 20 October – Gennadi Kryuchkov, Russian Baptist minister
- 31 October – Saima Karimova, Russian geologist (died 2013)
- 10 December – Nikolai Tishchenko, footballer

== Deaths ==
- 5 February - Theodor Nette, Soviet diplomatic courier of NKID (born 1896)
- 20 July - Felix Dzerzhinsky, Bolshevik revolutionary and politician (born 1877)
- 24 November – Leonid Krasin, politician (born 1870)
- 17 March - Aleksei Brusilov, General during WW1 and the Russian Civil War (born 1853)

== See also ==
- List of Soviet films of 1926
- 1926 in fine arts of the Soviet Union
