= Ural Tansykbayev =

Uzbekistani painter

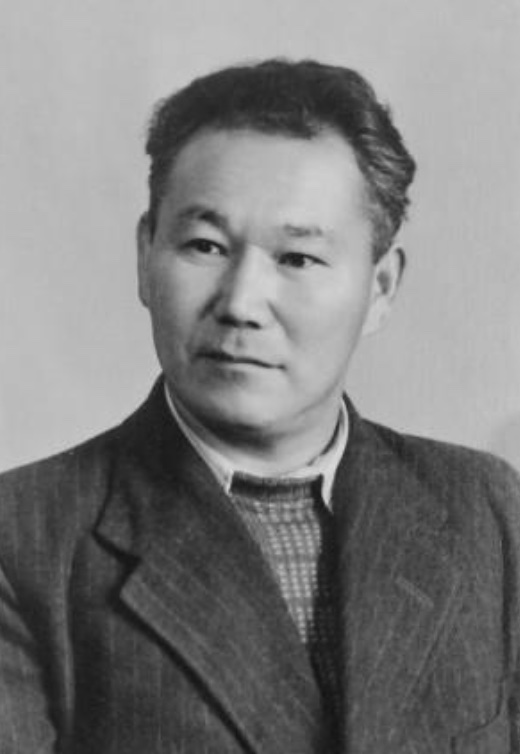
- Born: 1904; Tashkent, Russian Turkestan, Russian Empire
- Died: 18 April 1974 (aged 70); Nukus, Uzbek SSR, USSR
- Known for: Painting
- Spouse: Elizaveta Tansykbayeva
- Awards: Order of Lenin; Order of the Red Banner of Labour; Order of Outstanding Merit; People's Artist of USSR

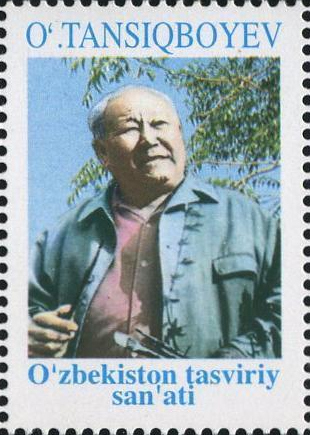
Tansykbayev on a 2001 stamp of Uzbekistan

Ural Tansykbaevich Tansykbayev (Note: Russian: Урал Тансыкбаевич Тансыкбаев; Uzbek: Oʻrol Tansiqboyev, Ўрол Тансиқбоев; Kazakh: Oral Tan'syqbaev, Орал Таңсықбаев; also spelled Ural Tansiqbaev; O'rol Tansiqboev; Oral Tansykbayev; Tansikbaev) (1 January 1904, in Tashkent, Russian Empire – 18 April 1974, in Nukus, Karakalpak ASSR) was an Uzbek painter of Kazakh descent. He was named a People's Artist of the USSR and People's Artist of the Uzbek SSR in the category visual art.

== Biography ==
Tansykbayev attended a Russian-Uzbek school (1916) and graduated from a seven-year school in 1919. Between 1919 and 1921 he worked at a tobacco factory and at a winery.

He studied with Russian painters and followers of the Peredvizhniki ("Wanderers"), first under Nikolay Vasilyevich Rozanov (1869–1940) in his art studio of Tashkent Art Museum (now Fine Arts Museum of Uzbekistan) (1924–1928), and later in the Art and Pedagogical Technical School, Penza (1928–1929), under Ivan Silovich Goryushkin-Sorokopudov (1873–1954) and Nikolay Filippovich Petrov (1872–1941).

There he became interested in Fauvism and the work of the French Expressionist's, influences noticeable in the increased decorativeness and heightened sense of colour in his early work.

From 1929 he participated in art exhibitions. Since 1932 he had been Steering Committee Member of the Union of Artists of Uzbekistan.

In 1938 he was the stage and costumes designer of the first national Kazakh ballet "Kalkaman and Mamir" (music of Vasily Vasilyevich Velikanov) at the Kazakh State Theatre of Opera and Ballet in Alma-Ata, production of the First Kazakh ballerina and choreographer Shara Zhienkulova (1912–1991) (based on the poem "Kalkaman and Mamir" of the historian and poet Şekerim Kudayberdiulı (Shakarim Qudaiberdiulı (1858–1931), the student of Abai Kunanbaiuli).

As a member of the Uzbekistan delegation he visited the World War II frontlines in 1942. Jointly with artists M. Arinin, S. Cheprakov, and Madra Mandicencio, he made more than 30 monumental paintings for the Uzbek pavilion at All-Union Agricultural Exhibition (VSKhV) (now All-Russia Exhibition Centre) in Moscow (1952–1955).

He was successively elected corresponding member (1954), and full member of the Academy of Arts of the USSR (1958). That year he was awarded a silver medal at Universal Exhibition in Brussels Expo '58 (1958) (Exposition universelle et internationale de Bruxelles, Wereldtentoonstelling Brussel 1958 (Belgium).

The theme of his early paintings is connected with the searches for expressive means, forms of reflection of the reality. They are intensive and enriched by their colours, decorative. Since the beginning of the 1950s the main genre in his art had become landscape.

Tansykbayev participated in many exhibitions in Uzbekistan, in Moscow and abroad.

He died on 18 April 1974.

== Awards ==
- Order of Lenin (1 June 1964)
- State Hamza Prize (1973)
- Three Order of the Red Banner of Labour (6 December 1951, 26 March 1955, 11 January 1957)
- Repin State Prize of the RSFSR
- Order of Outstanding Merit (22 August 2001)

== Museums ==
Ural Tansykbaev Memorial Museum in Tashkent was opened on 16 January 1981 by his widow Yelizaveta Tansykbaeva.

The center of the whole exposition is the studio of master with an easel, which holds the last, unfinished canvas. Besides the studio, the house includes the sitting-room, bedroom and study room, in which the painter loved to write sketches. On the walls of the house, visitors may watch still lifes, sketches – all at the same places as they used to be hanged while the painter was alive.

In 1994 the Exhibition Hall was built at the territory of memorial house. The Hall regularly hosts exhibitions of paintings from museum collection, works of modern painters, as well as a constant exposition of Ural Tansykbaev's canvases.
