= Alfred Eberling =

Russian artist and teacher (1872–1951)

- Альфред Эберлинг
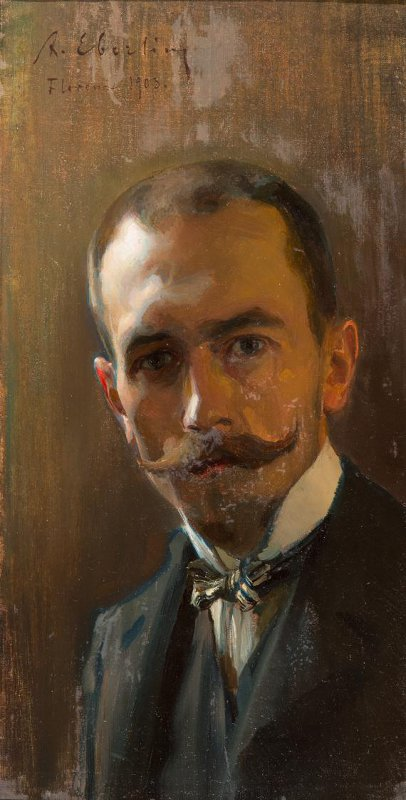
- Self-Portrait, signed and dated 1903, oils; Russian Museum, St. Petersburg
- Born: 3 January 1872; Zgierz, Congress Poland, Russian Empire
- Died: 18 January 1951 (aged 79); Leningrad, Soviet Union
- Resting place: Shuvalovskoye Cemetery, St. Petersburg
- Education: Ilya Repin
- Known for: Portrait painting
- Style: Realism
- Spouse(s): Lyubov Poduskova (m. 1900; div. 1915) Yelena Ivanova (m. 1926)
- Children: 2

Wilhelm Alfred Eberling, (Note: Russian: Вильге́льм А́льфред Э́берлинг.) also known as Alfred Rudolfovich Eberling (Russian: Альфред Рудольфович Эберлинг; 3 January 1872 – 17 January 1951), was a Russian painter of Polish-German descent, active in Saint Petersburg (later Leningrad) from the reign of Emperor Alexander III through the rule of Joseph Stalin. He is particularly known for his portraits.

== Biography ==
Eberling studied at the Imperial Academy of Arts from 1889 to 1897. From 1896 to 1897 he was a student of Ilya Repin. In 1891, he was awarded a small silver medal for a sketch from life. In 1898 he traveled to Constantinople to work on church paintings. In 1899 he received the title of artist for his paintings "Turkish Cemetery" and "Prima Vera". He then became a student of Franz von Lenbach in Munich.

In 1904, Eberling began a teaching career that would last for several years. From 1904 to 1917, he taught at the drawing school of the Imperial Society for the Encouragement of Fine Arts. During this period he produced about a hundred portraits, mainly of representatives of the world of theater. In 1910, he illustrated Mikhail Lermontov's poem Demon. After the October Revolution of 1917, in 1918, he participated in the creation of the Technical and Artistic School of Drawing, where he taught until 1933. In 1925–1930, he directed the art workshop of the Association of Artists of Revolutionary Russia in Leningrad. In 1934, at the invitation of Isaak Brodsky, he took the place of the professor of painting, drawing and composition at the Ilya Repin Institute of Painting, Sculpture and Architecture, where he worked until 1937. At the same time, until 1940, he taught at the art studio of the Leningrad Palace of Pioneers and at the House of Science. These institutions aside, he taught privately in his studio on Tchaikovsky Street; his notable students include Vyacheslav Zagonek, Yuri Tulin, and Boris Ugarov, as well as historian Mikhail German.

Throughout the 1920s and 1930s, on commission from Goznak, Eberling created portraits of Karl Marx, Vladimir Lenin, Joseph Stalin, Vyacheslav Molotov, Lazar Kaganovich, and Mikhail Kalinin, to enable them to be reproduced in large print runs. In 1924, he won the competition announced by Goznak for the best portrait of Lenin, and then created the drawings needed to print banknotes that appeared in 1937. In the post-war years, Eberling's drawing was used as a watermark on Soviet banknotes issued between 1947 and 1957.

== Selected works ==
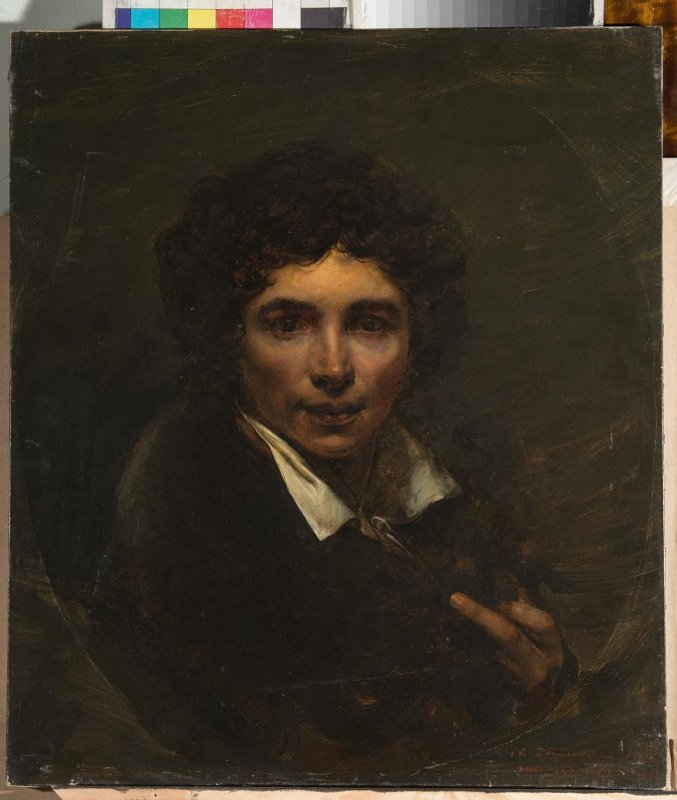
Orest Kiprensky, 1902, after Kiprensky's 1820 self-portrait; Russian Museum, St. Petersburg

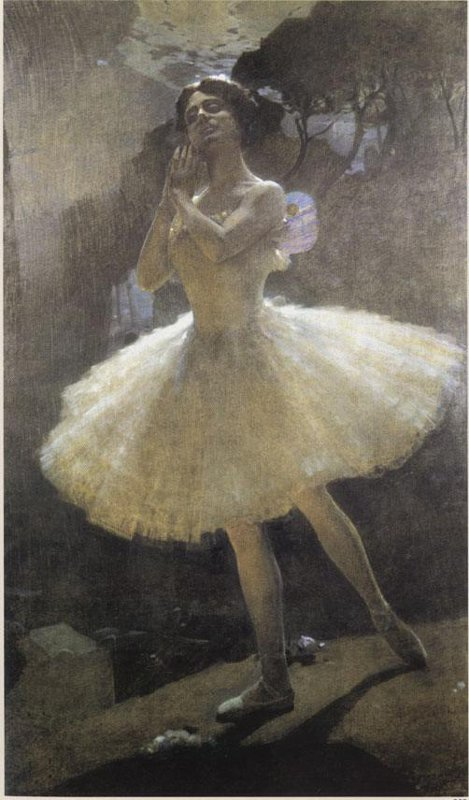
Anna Pavlova as Giselle, 1906; Museum of Theatre and Music, St. Petersburg

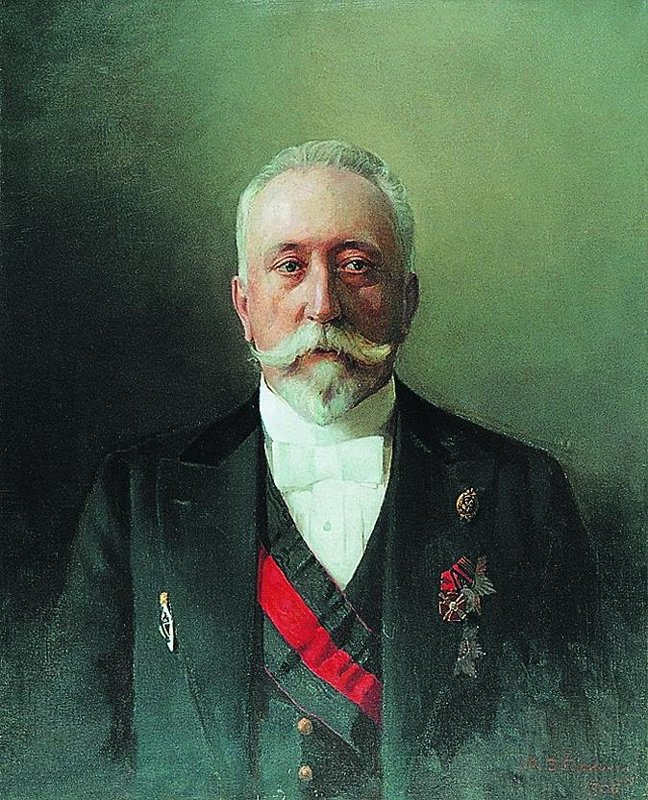
Mikhail Galkin-Vraskoy, 1906; Radishchev Museum, Saratov, donated by the sitter, once an Imperial governor in Saratov, in 1906

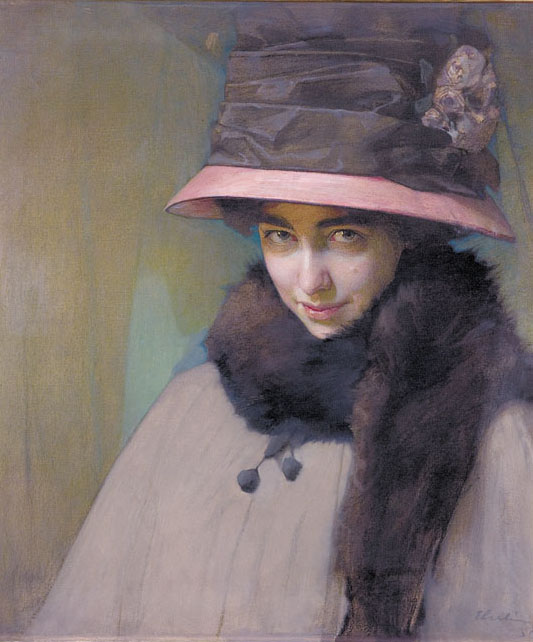
Irina Maximovich, 1911; auctioned at MacDougall's in May 2005

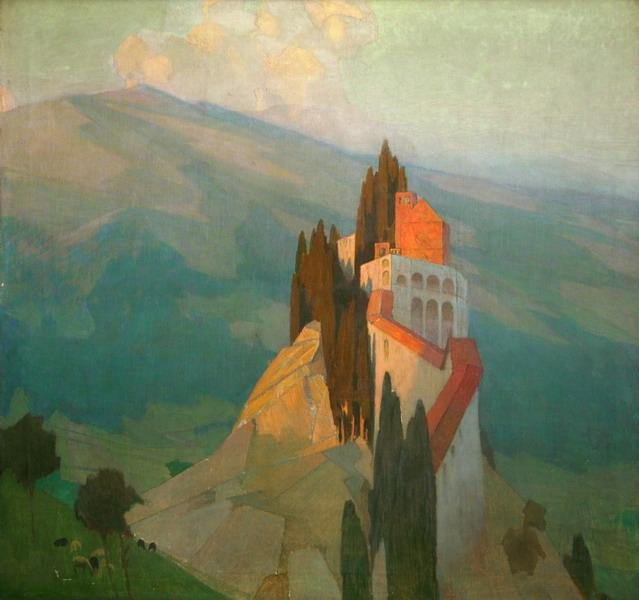
View of Mountains in Tuscany, 1912; State Art Museum of Altai Krai, Barnaul

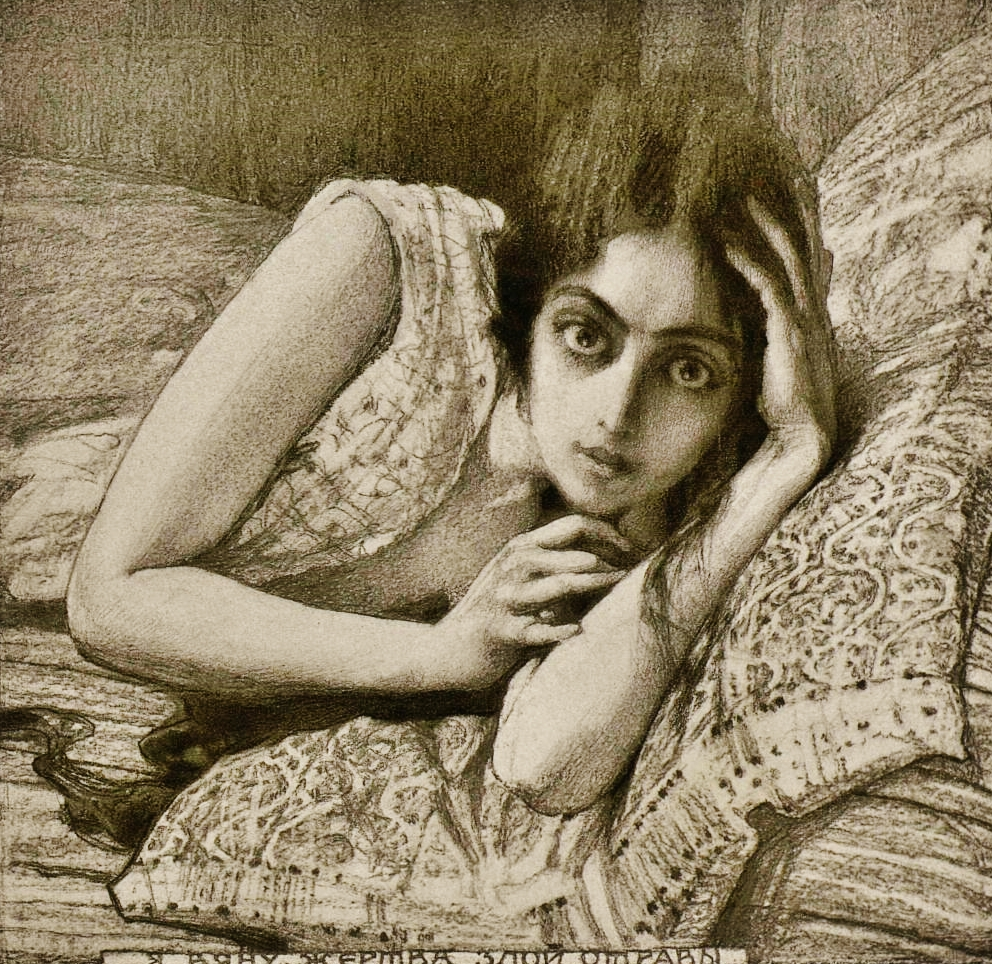
I Fade, I Wither Like a Flower, illustration from a 1910 edition of Lermontov's Demon

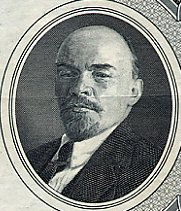
Portrait of Lenin on a banknote

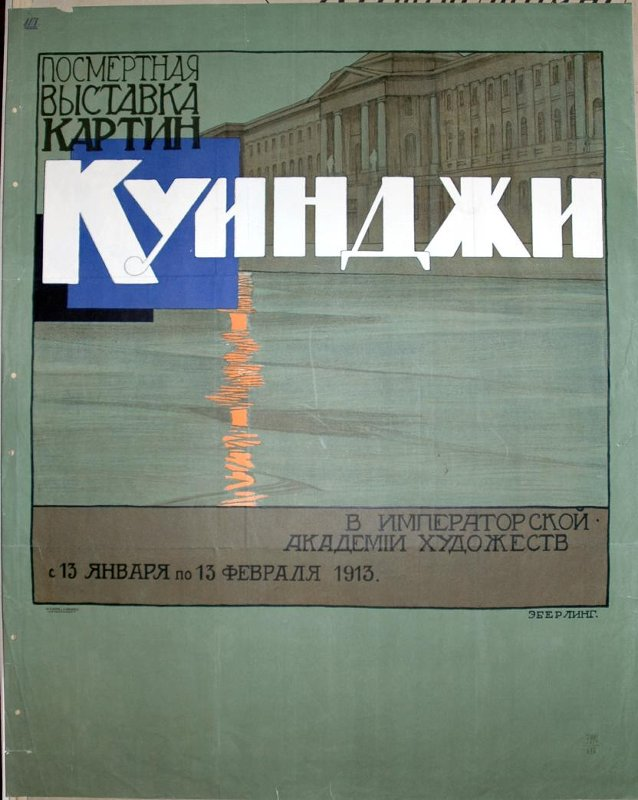
Poster for the Kuindzhi commemorative exhibition, 1913, chromolithography

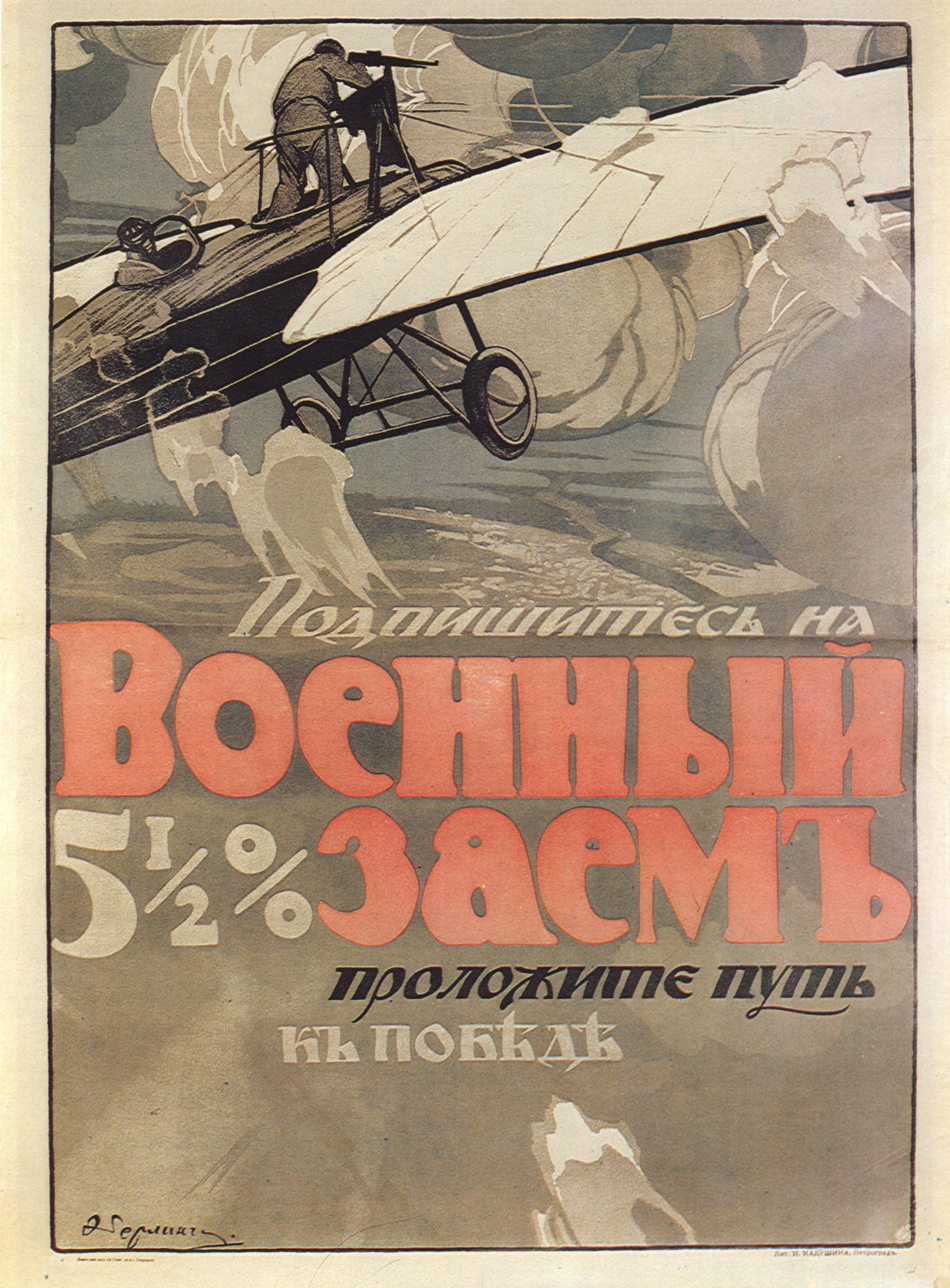
War bonds advertisement, 1916

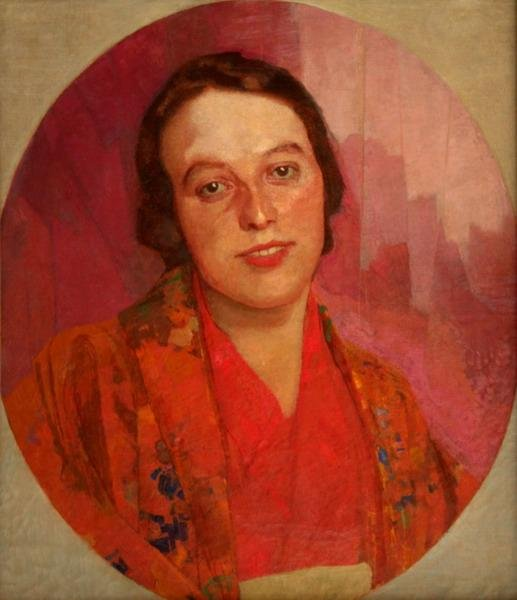
Portrait of a Woman, 1935; State Art Museum of Altai Krai

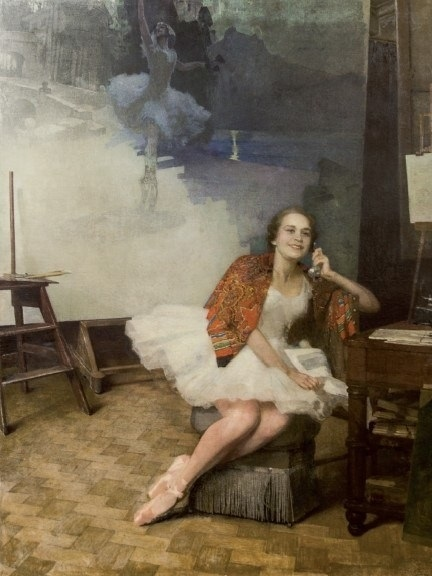
Marina Semyonova, c. 1936–1940; Vaganova Ballet Academy, St. Petersburg, donated by Yelena Ivanova-Eberling, the painter's widow, during the 1950s

== Sources ==
- Borovko, Aleksandr A. (2024). А. Р. Эберлинг и его музы (in Russian). Moscow: Pero. ISBN 978-5-00244-466-3.
