= Aleksandr Makovsky =

Russian painter

- Александр Владимирович Маковский
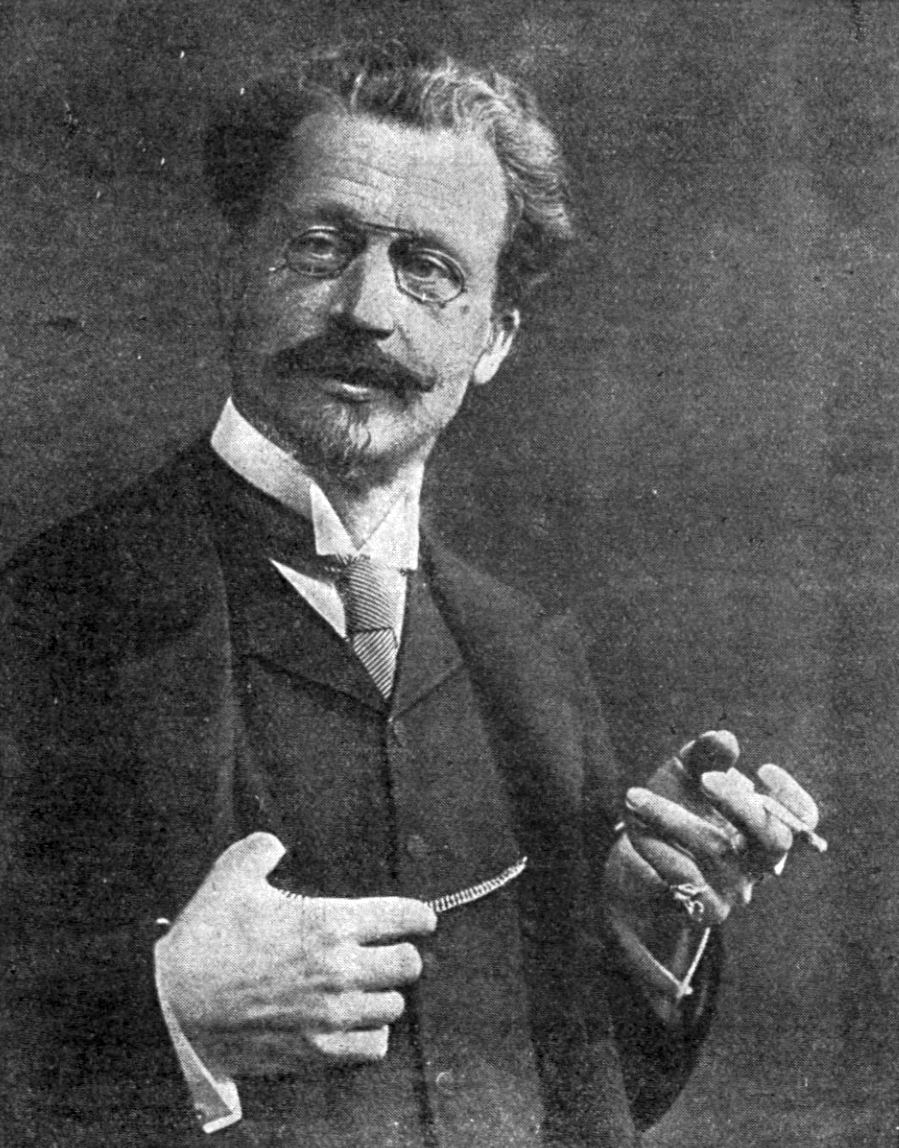
- Aleksandr Makovsky (1913)
- Born: March 24, 1869; Moscow
- Died: October 26, 1924 (aged 55)
- Alma mater: Imperial Academy of Arts (1889); Member Academy of Arts (1911); Professor by rank (1913)
- Known for: Painting
- Style: Realism
- Movement: Peredvizhniki

Aleksandr Vladimirovich Makovsky (Russian: Александр Владимирович Маковский; 5 April 1869, Moscow – 26 October 1924, Leningrad) was a Russian Realist painter and graphic artist; associated with the Peredvizhniki.

== Biography ==
His father was the painter, Vladimir Makovsky, who gave him his first art lessons. His uncles, Konstantin and Nikolay were also painters.

In 1884, he enrolled at the Moscow School of Painting, Sculpture and Architecture, where he studied with Illarion Pryanishnikov and Vasily Polenov as well as continuing to work with his father. While there, he was awarded several silver medals. From 1889 to 1893, he was in Paris, attending a private art school operated by Fernand Cormon. Upon completing his courses, he was named an "Artist First-Class" by the Academy.

The following year, he returned to the Academy and entered the workshops of Ilya Repin. He graduated in 1895. Two years later, he became the curator of textbooks at the Academy's library and, in 1898, was promoted to supervisor of teacher training. He was also the author of numerous textbooks on drawing and painting.

Later, he opened a private art studio. One of his most notable students was Vitaly Tikhov. In 1902, he became a member of the Peredvizhniki, with whom he been periodically exhibiting since 1893. From 1907 to 1922, he served as a member of the governing board.

In 1911, he was named an "Academician" and, two years later, was named a Professor at the Academy and appointed head of the Higher Art School. After the Academy was abolished, he taught at the Naval College. In 1919, he participated in the first "State Free Exhibition". Just before his death, he had a showing at an exhibition of the Association of Artists of Revolutionary Russia.

== Selected paintings ==
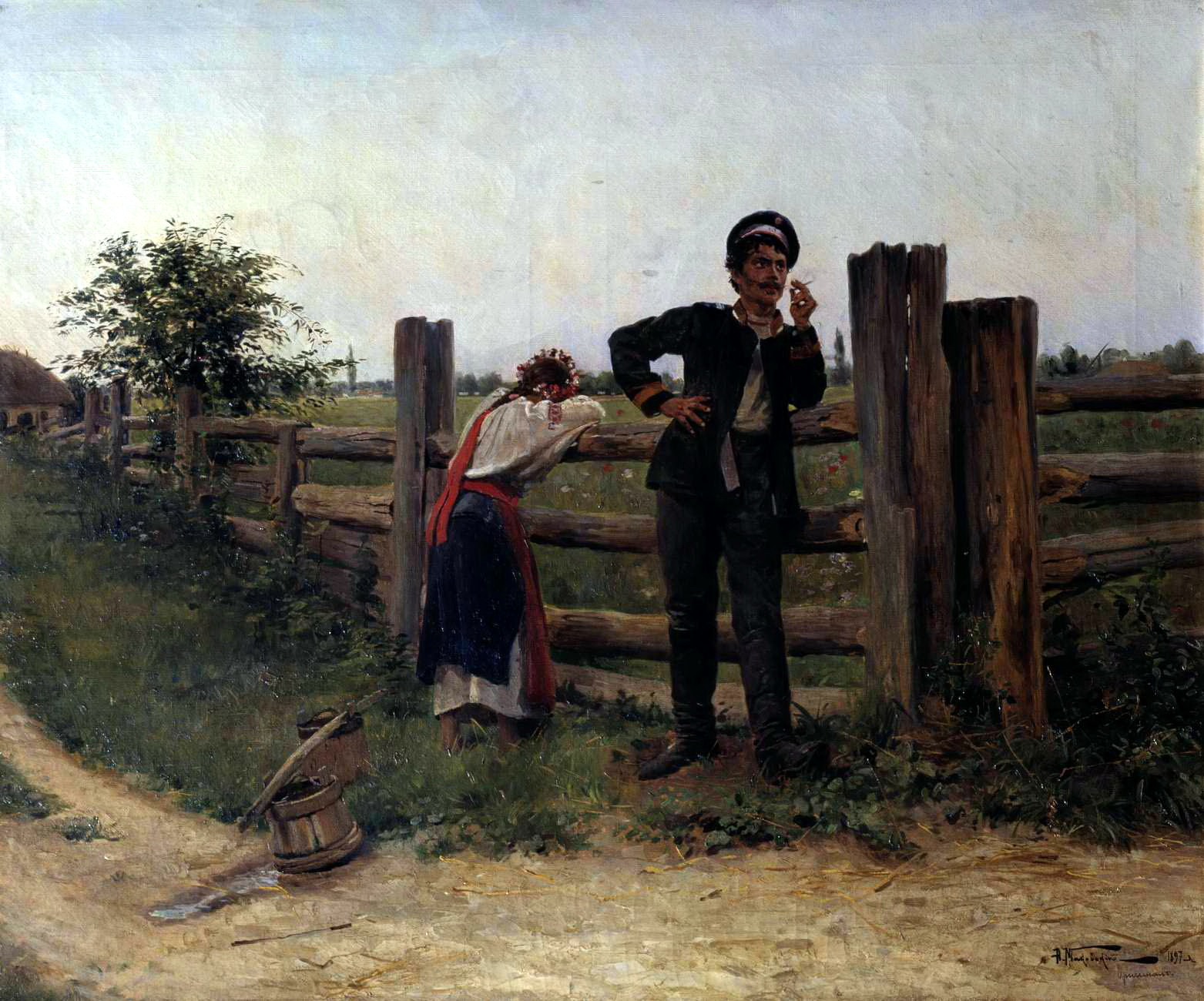
Bothered
(or, "I am Bored with You")

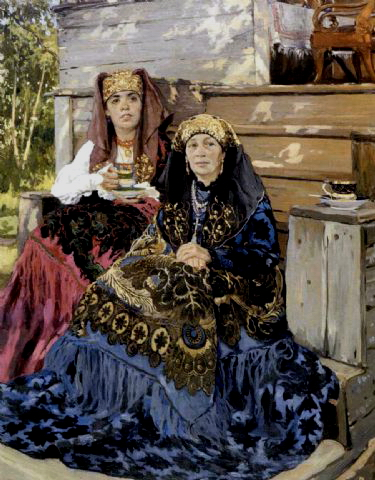
The Tea Drinkers

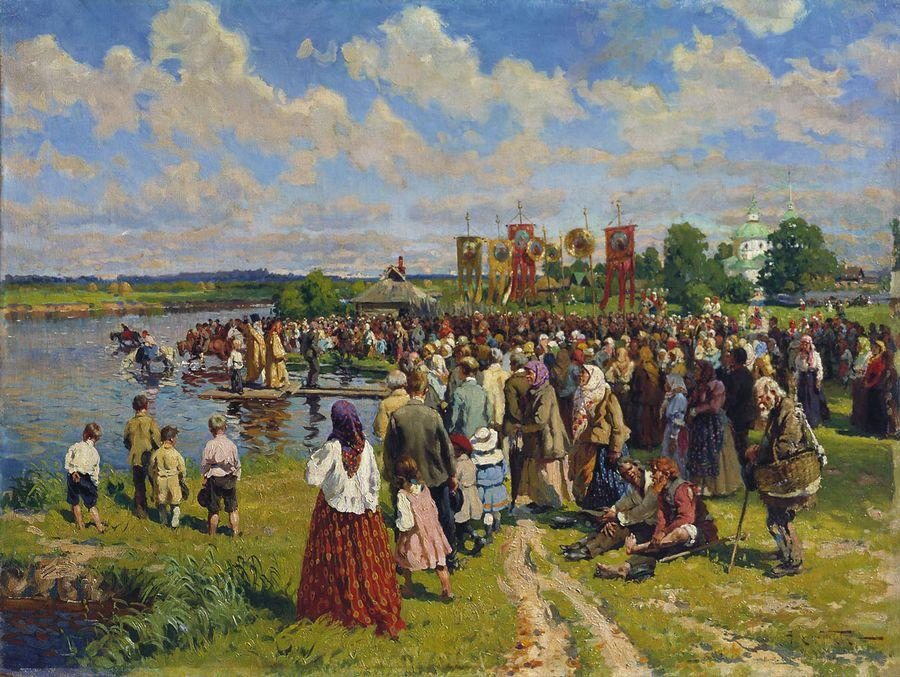
The Procession of Saints
Florus and Laurus

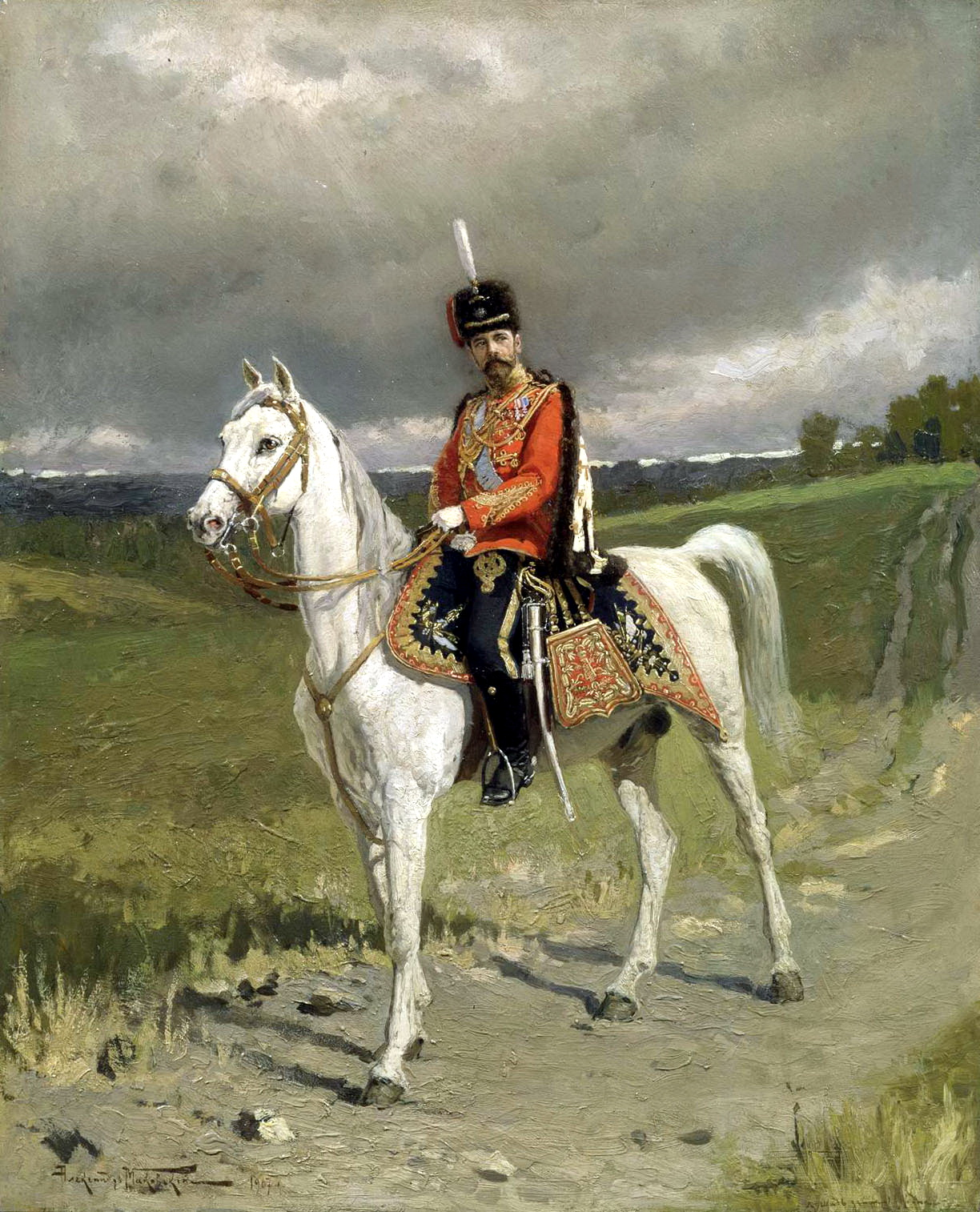
Tsar Nicholas II
