= Ivan Goryushkin-Sorokopudov =

Russian painter (1873–1954)

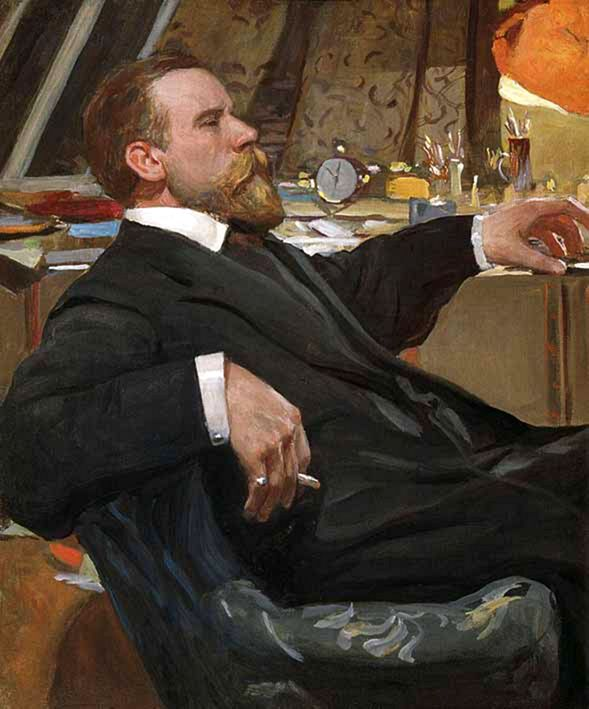
- Portrait of Ivan Goryushkin-Sorokopudov by Alexander Vakhrameyev, 1900s
- Born: 5 November 1873; Nashchi, Yelatomsky Uyezd, Tambov Governorate, Russian Empire
- Died: 29 December 1954 (aged 81); Ivanovka, Penzensky District, Penza Oblast, RSFSR, USSR

Ivan Silych Goryushkin-Sorokopudov (Russian: Иван Силыч Горюшкин-Сорокопудов; 5 November 1873 – 29 December 1954) was a Russian painter working in the Russian Empire and the Soviet Union.

== Biography ==
Ivan Goryushkin-Sorokopudov was born in Nashchi Village of Tambov Governorate. His father was a burlak.

== Gallery ==
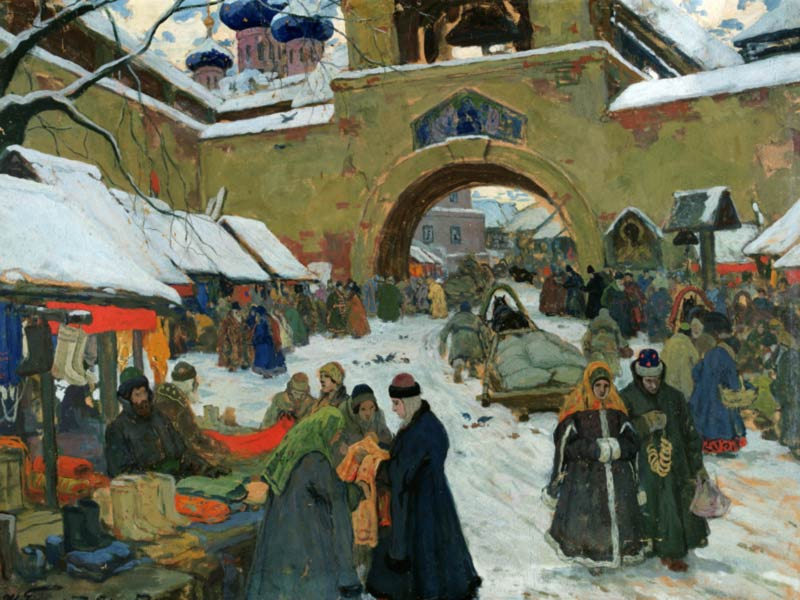
Bazaar, 1910

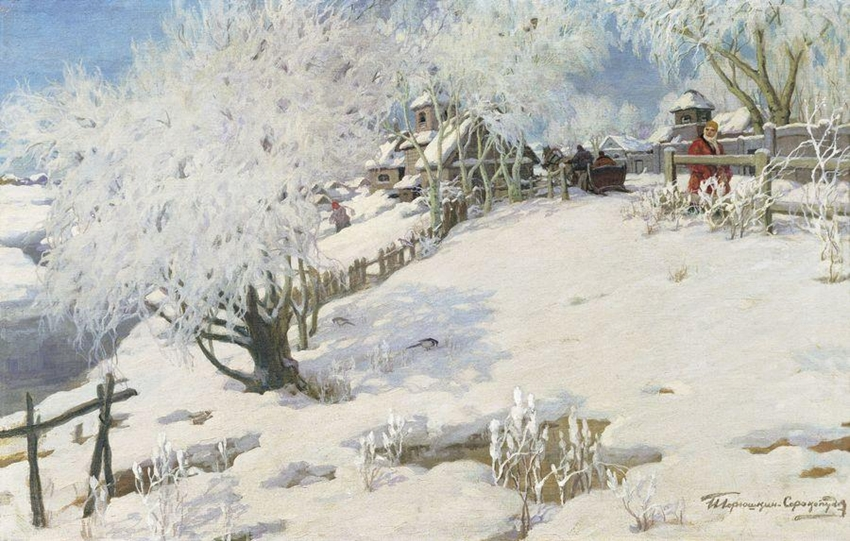

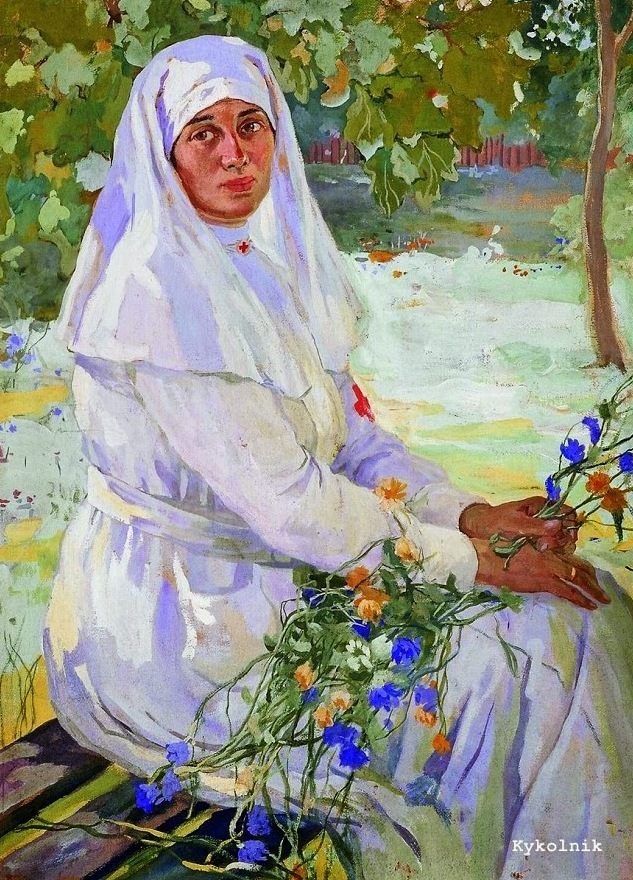

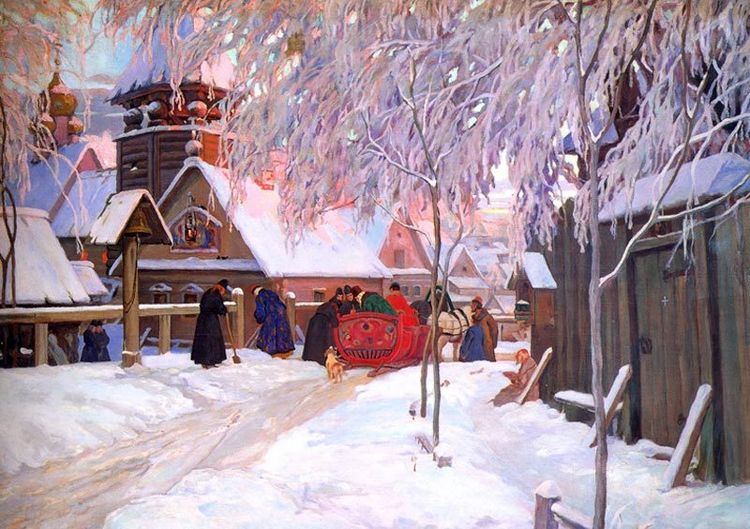
Boyar's visit to a minster, 1912

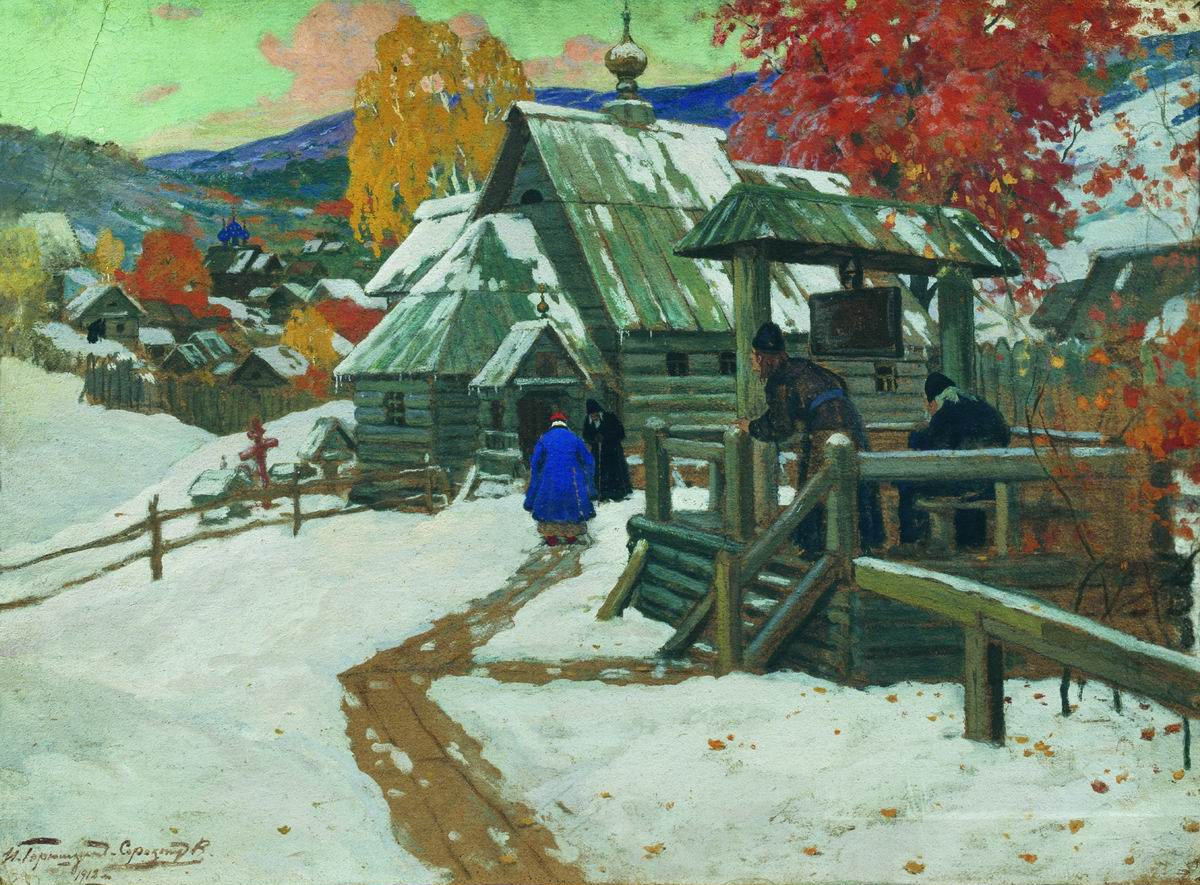
The Skete, 1912
