= Nikolai Nagibin =

Red army soldier

Nikolai Anisimovich Nagibin
- Николай Анисимович Нагибин
- Born: 1924; Terehta village, Ust-Koksinsky District, Altai Krai, Soviet Union
- Died: 25 January 1945 (aged 20–21); Poland
- Military career
- Allegiance: Soviet Union
- Branch: Red Army
- Service years: 1941–1945
- Rank: Red Army Soldier
- Unit: 15th Guards Rifle Division
- Conflicts: World War II; Vistula-Oder Offensive †
- Awards: Hero of the Soviet Union

Nikolai Anisimovich Nagibin (Russian: Николай Анисимович Нагибин; 1924 – 25 January 1945) was a Red Army soldier and posthumous Hero of the Soviet Union. He was awarded the title Hero of the Soviet Union and the Order of Lenin for his usage of a machine gun to hold a bridgehead over the Oder during the Vistula–Oder Offensive in January 1945.

== Early life ==
Nagibin was born in 1924 in the village of Terehta in Altai Krai to a peasant family. He graduated from fifth grade and worked on a collective farm.

== World War II ==
In 1941, Nagibin was drafted into the Red Army and fought in combat from February 1942. He became a driver in the 371st Artillery Regiment of the 140th Rifle Division by the spring of 1944. Nagibin was awarded the Medal "For Courage" on 30 March for his speedy delivery of ammunition to the guns and camouflaging of horses to prevent aerial surveillance. At some point he transferred units and became a machine gunner in the 15th Guards Rifle Division's 50th Guards Rifle Regiment by January 1945.

On 23 January, Nagibin was reportedly among the first to cross the Oder at the Preisdorf village north of Opole. After reaching the right bank, he opened fire with his machine gun and suppressed two German machine guns. When his gun became inoperable, he reportedly moved forward with grenades and killed two German machine gunners. Taking the weapons of the dead German soldiers, Nagibin reportedly pursued the retreating German troops, killing 45 and capturing 7. These actions helped his company cross the Oder.

Nagibin was killed in action during the battle for the Oder bridgehead on 25 January. He was buried in Opole. On 27 June 1945, he was posthumously awarded the title Hero of the Soviet Union and the Order of Lenin.
