= Lenin Enrollment =

Joseph Stalin committed a full page of the 1926 first edition of his selected works to the dedication: "To the Lenin Enrollment / I dedicate this / I. Stalin." This short note preceded his seminal Foundations of Leninism (1924).

The Lenin Enrollment or the Lenin Levy (ru: Ленинский призыв, Leninskii prizyv), named in honor of Vladimir Lenin, is the name given to campaigns organized in 1924 and 1925 which sought to enlist more members of the proletariat into the Russian Communist Party. In all, more than 608,000 people, called lenintsy, ("Leninists") were recruited as part of this targeted effort, doubling the size of the organization and fundamentally changing the nature of the party at the local level.

The campaign came in response to growing criticism of the Communist Party as elitist by left wing critics. Even though the party claimed to represent the working class, much of its membership, and particularly its leadership, hailed from the intelligentsia and the emerging Soviet state and party bureaucracy. An injection of "workers from the bench" was sought to offset this influence and to help establish the party as a bulwark against growing influence of the peasantry, who constituted a big majority of the agricultural nation.

Although named for Lenin, who died January 21, 1924, the proletarian recruitment campaign was actually initiated in December 1923, with successive meetings of the Politburo, Central Committee, and the 13th Party Conference of the Russian Communist Party all pushing forward the plan prior to Lenin's death.

These new party members typically had a low educational achievement level and were, it has been argued, malleable clay in the hands of the party elite, paving the way for the unitary rule of Joseph Stalin.

== History ==
=== Russian Communist Party membership in 1917 ===
Following their victory in October 1917, during which the sitting Russian Provisional Government was overthrown and the January 1918 dispersal of the elected Constituent Assembly, the Russian Communist Party (Bolsheviks) [RKP(b)] found themselves in the seat of power, aided for a time by the organization of Left Socialist-Revolutionaries as a junior partner. Bolshevik Party membership is estimated to have been approximately 23,600 at the start of the revolutionary year of 1917.

The legalization of left wing political parties that was part of the February Revolution brought with it a flood of new members to all of these organizations, the Bolsheviks certainly not excluded. By April 1917 ranks of the Bolshevik organization had grown to an estimated 46,000. Growth continued throughout the year, with the party touting an estimated membership of 115,000 by the start of 1918.

Pioneering scholar of the size and composition of the Soviet Communist Party T.H. Rigby summarized the situation:

"Despite [the] inadequacies in our data and difficulties of interpretation, the essential picture seems clear enough. In the months following the downfall of the tsarist regime, the party expanded at a hectic rate. By the time of the seizure of power, the 20,000 or so men of the Bolshevik underground had been reduced to a small fraction of the party membership...

=== Russian Communist Party membership during the Civil War ===
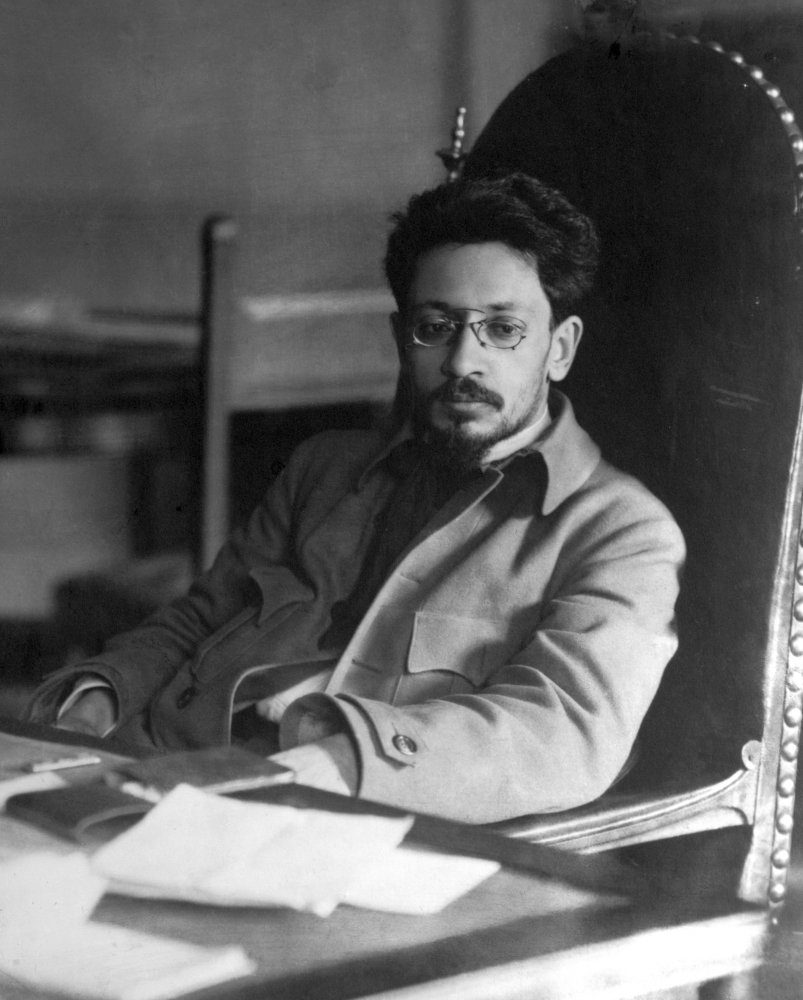
Yakov Sverdlov was secretary of the Communist Party during the years of the civil war.

Communist Party record keeping continued to be deficient during the years of the Russian Civil War. While growth continued, its precise magnitude was unknown even to top party officials themselves. On the eve of the 8th Party Congress in March 1919, party secretary Yakov Sverdlov estimated total party membership at 700,000, while actual reports of participants indicated an actual membership of perhaps half of that. "This haziness about even such a basic fact as the crude size of the party is hardly surpising if one considers that, up to March 1919, the Central Committee was receiving regular reports from...only 3 out of the 36 guberniyas and 52 out of 219 uyezds," Rigby notes.

A later estimate by the Communist Party's statistical department pegged organizational membership in January 1919 at just 251,000. Despite the haziness of such estimates, "there can be little doubt as to the massive enlistment of new members in the immediate aftermath of the October Revolution," Rigby observes. With civil war raging and the fate of the revolution hanging in the balance, counting the noses of party members was "just one of the many aspects of the party's internal affairs which the leadership had no time to give their attention to in the heat of establishing the new regime," Rigby notes.

As the Communist Party moved into positions of economic and civil administration, the social composition of its membership began to change. At the time of the March 1919 8th Congress, one-sixth of participating delegates engaged full time in party work, with two-thirds holding positions in the Soviets. A number of speakers at this gathering observed that local communists were beginning to emerge as a privileged stratum, using their party cards as a means to secure preference in housing and jobs, acquiring scarce extra rations, and exerting pressure to benefit the economic situation of their friends. An increased emphasis was to be placed on recruiting workers and peasants, with a "re-registration" of existing party members declared in an effort to weed out undesirable individuals who had gained party cards, with this process lated for completion by July 1, 1919.

It was only at the time of the 8th Party Conference of the RKP(b) in December 1919 that the loose amalgam of "sypathizers" and active party members began to be regularized. New requirements were imposted specifying that new party members would require the sponsorship of two existing members with at least six months of tenure and that all candidates for party membership undergo a probationary period during which meetings could be attended but votes not cast. Workers and peasants were to remain candidates for at least two months, while the probationary period was extended for members of all other social classes for no fewer than six months.

=== Russian Communist Party membership during early NEP ===
Lenin's health broke down at the end of 1922. On November 20 of that year he spoke to the Moscow Soviet in what would prove to be his final public speech. On December 12, with his health in perilous condition, he retired from public life to his apartment in the Kremlin, where he suffered a severe stroke four days later. This event, his second stroke, paralyzed the right side of Lenin's body, effectively forcing him into isolation. While he retained cognitive functionand was able to write articles and notes on political affairs for the next few months, he saw no prominent leaders during this interval, communicating only through notes passed to and from his wife, Nadezhda Krupskaya.

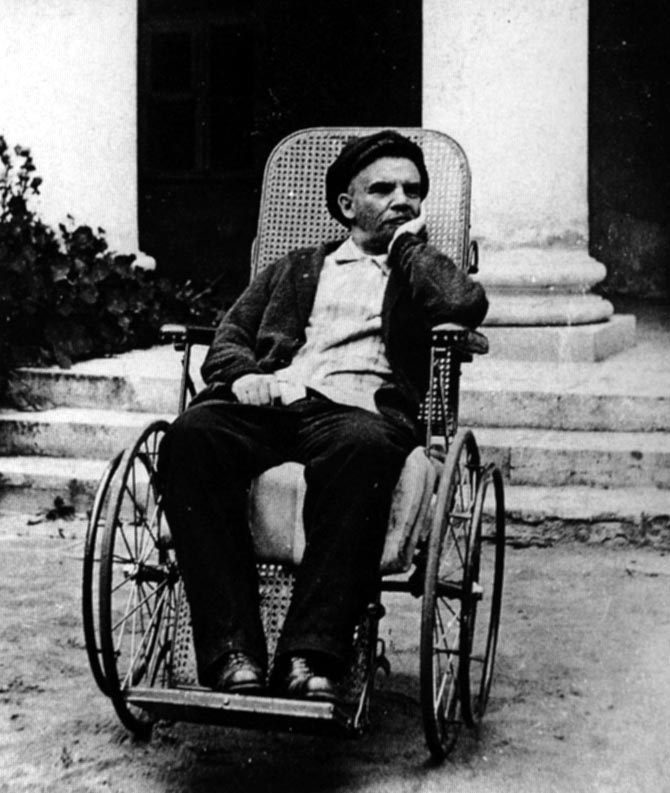
Communist Party leader V.I. Ulyanov (Lenin) was permanently incapacitated by his third stroke, suffered in March 1923. He died the following January.

In March 1923, the ailing Soviet leader suffered an incapacitating third stroke, which effectively ended any possibility of recovery and return to active leadership of the Commmunist Party and the Council of People's Commissars. His health continued to deteriorate throughout the year, with death obviously approaching as fall turned to winter.

=== Launch of the Lenin Enrollment ===
So-called "deproletarianization" of the RKP(b) had been an issue for several years already, with the Workers' Opposition of 1920–21 having blamed the deteriorating condition of the Russian working class on the growth of bureaucratism within the party. The left wing around Trotsky had renewed the issue in 1923, forcing the party leadership towards a reevaluation of the cautious approach followed after the conclusion of the civil war, which had placed an emphasis on the quality of candidates rather than their quantity.

In October 1923 the division between Leon Trotsky and the Politburo majority reached a denouement, with Trotsky issuing a pair of letters to the Central Committee attacking the economic policies of the "triumvirate" of Grigory Zinoviev, Joseph Stalin, and Lev Kamenev and charging that "the bureaucratization of the party apparatus has reached unheard of proportions through the application of the methods of the secretarial section." Shortly after Trotsky's first letter was dispatched, a group of leading party members — including prominently Evegenii Preobrazhensky, Leonid Serebriakov, and Iurii Piatakov — issued the so-called Declaration of the 46, echoing Trotsky's criticism and demanding convocation of a Communist Party conference at which members of all points of view could state their case.>

It was in this turbulent political environment that the Lenin Enrollment was launched on December 5, 1923, when a plenum of the Central Committee and Central Control Commission of the RKP(b) issued a resolution calling for the recruitment of 100,000 workers into party ranks.

This Politburo resolution initiating the proletarianization campaign was signed by Stalin, Trotsky, and Kamenev and declared that

"In the coming months, the increase of the proletarian nucleus must be one of the main tasks of the party.... The party must facilitate the influx of production workers into its organizations and lead the candidates to become full members.

This was followed with action at the plenum of the Central Committee of the RKP(b) held January 14–15, 1924, when Grigory Zinoviev advanced a resolution seeking "an increase in the flow of workers admitted to the party, fixed in the regulatory texts of our organization as an integral part of our policy." According to Zinoviev, the purpose of such a campaign to boost workers from the bench was to "fight against the revival of Menshevism" among young party members. This was transparently an effort of the triumvirate to inject factory youth en masse into the party ranks to "water down" the influence of young intellectuals from the universities — the latter being a primary bulwark of Trotsky's support. Moreover, this insertion of factory workers in great numbers was intended as a counterbalance to potential growing influence of influence of the peasantry within the party.

The 13th Party Conference of the RKP(b) opened the day after the conclusion of the January 14–15 Central Committee plenum, holding its sessions in Moscow from January 16 to 18, 1924. This gathering put a number on the new enrollment campaign, authorizing the admission of at least 100,000 "ethnic proletarians" into the party and blocking admission of other social groups.

Final guidelines for admission were postponed, however, as party leader V.I. Lenin finally succumbed to the effects of his series of strokes on January 21, 1924. A period of shock and mourning swept the party and its supporters throughout the country. This confluence of the existing campaign for proletarianization of the Communist Party with the death of that organization's founder led to a rebranding of the worker recruitment effort as the "Lenin Enrollment" (Leninskii prizyv), with that term first being used on February 8 in articles in the newspapers Pravda and Krasnaia gazeta.

The recruitment campaign had been further perfected at the January 31 Central Committee plenum, in which Zinoviev and V.M. Molotov presented an outline program, intended to last three months, accelerating the recruitment of "workers from the bench" into the party. Final details of the program were to be left to the Politburo for decision.

=== The 1924 Lenin Enrollment ===
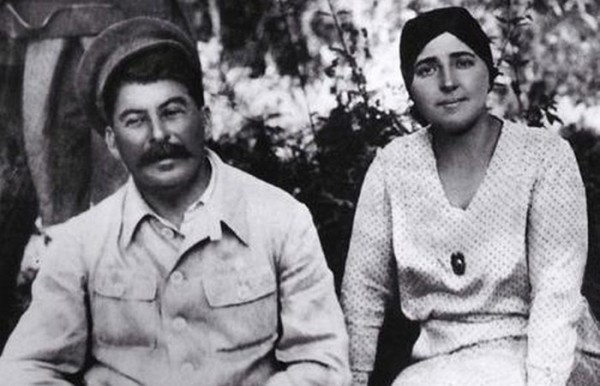
Joseph Stalin became General Secretary of the Russian Communist Party in 1922. He is shown here in that year with his wife, Nadezhda Allilueva.

The period from 1924 to 1933 were years of rapid expansion of the All-Union Communist Party, during which time its ranks grew from under half a million to more than 3.5 million members. The Lenin Enrollment of 1924 was an important first phase of this process, when in just three months the party expanded its ranks by 40 percent.

Between the official launch of the Lenin Enrollment on February 15 and the scheduled completion of the campaign on May 15, 1924, the Communist Party received more than 300,000 applications for membership, of which more than 200,000 were accepted. These new recruits were known by a specific name, lenintsy. About half of these were veterans of the Red Army during the civil war, and most had previous activity in various factory, trade union, or party sympathizer organizations.

On January 1, 1924, the tracking of membership figures finally having been regularized, the Communist Party counted 446,089 members in its ranks. By August 1, 1924, approximately 666,000 individuals were paying dues to the organization. For the complete years 1924 and 1925, the two "Lenin Enrollment" recruitment drives and other campaigns brought in 638,070 additional members, of whom 439,715 (68.9%) were members of the working class "by social situation." Taking into account the inevitable churn of members out of the organization, total party membership on January 1, 1926, stood just over the 1 million member mark.

In addition, a parallel recruitment drive in the party's youth section, the Komsomol, generated an additional 400,000 members for that organization.

Academic study of the Lenin Enrollment in Moscow has revealed that the overwhelming majority of new recurits to the Communist Party were male workers under the age of 34, of whom a majority were considered "skilled workers" in the factory setting. By the end of the 1924 campaign, fully two-thirds of the Moscow party organization were workers by social origin and 48 percent remain employed in some form of manual labor. The percentage of workers in Moscow factories who were members of the Communist Party climbed from 4 percent ahead of the campaign to 13 percent after — with a considerably higher percentage in male-dominated heavy industry and a lower percentage in the female-dominated textile factories.

By the end of 1924, with focused recruitment of "workers from the bench," the proportion of party members actively engaged as workers expanded from 18.8 to 41.3 percent — compared to 49.2 percent of the party working as directors and white-collar employees and 9.5 percent engaged in agriculture.

These national figures varied somewhat from region to region and republic to republic, of course. In Georgia, for example, the percentage of workers in the Communist Party stood at 17 percent in 1923, which was elevated to 39 percent by 1925. However, during the same period the percent of ethnic Georgians in the party declined by 6 percent, indicating that non-Georgian workers benefited disproportionately from the new party membership process.

=== The training of new cadres ===
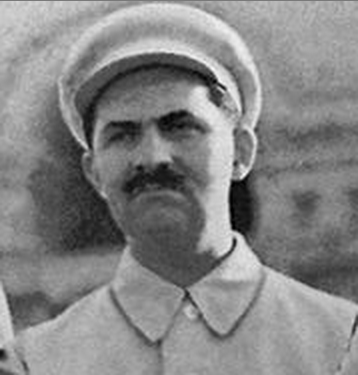
Lazar Kaganovich, a close political associate of Joseph Stalin, headed the committee in charge of political training of the new lenintsy.

Despite having practical experience in the ranks of the Red Army and as workers in industry, this mass of new arrivals were largely uneducated and lacked political acumen or training. Just two weeks after the February 15 start of the campaign, the Secretariat assigned Lazar Kaganovich the task of drafting an elementary booklet for new recruits explaining the Communist Party's political line and statutes. The problem was so acute that a plenum of the Central Committee held on April 2 passed a resolution creating a special commission of the Central Committee to "educate the recruits of the Lenin Enrollment." The need to prepare for the forthcoming 13th Party Congress, which opened on May 23, put this educational commission on hold, however.

Only on June 9 was the party's Organizational Bureau (Orgburo) able to set up the educational commission, headed by Kaganovich and including Krupskaya, Isaak Zelensky, Vilhelm Knorin, Sergei Syrtsov, and others. On June 18, top leaders Zinoviev, Stalin, Nikolai Bukharin, Vyacheslav Molotov, and Andrei Andreev joined the commission, adding gravitas to its mission.

As party ranks continued to swell, the retrograde educational level of new party continued to make itself painfully apparent. In July an exception to the prohibition of admission of non-workers was granted by the Secretariat providing for the admission into the party of 1,000 primary school teachers, who were to be given the task of elementary training of the new proletarian lenintsy.

At the August 1924 plenum of the Central Committee, Kaganovich reported on the work of the educational commission, characterizing the level of study and comprehension of the lenintsy as superior to their peers but "obviously lower than those of the other members of the party. Kaganovich expressed concern over the lack of discipline of these new members, declaring, "They think they are the representatives of the workers, linked to the mass of non-party members, and think that the sacred duty of the Communist is to support the demands of workers at all times, whether it is necessary or not."

=== Legacy ===
From the early years of focused Soviet studies in the 1940s and 1950s, Western historians have long debated the significance of the "re-proletarianization" effort that was explicitly part of the 1924–25 Lenin Enrollment. Historian Lewis Siegelbaum has observed that the Lenin Enrollment has traditionally been depicted as either a tactical maneuver by the Zinoviev–Stalin–Kamenev triumvirate to undercut the Left Opposition's primary issue of "bureaucratism" or as part of a grand Machievellian scheme by Stalin to "swamp the party with members who would be obedient to the [party] secretariat" he controlled, opening the door for the seizure of uncontested personal power.

Writing in 1953, at the time of Stalin's death, and reflecting the perspective of this first generation of Soviet studies experts, historian E. H. Carr characterized the Lenin Enrollment and its remaking of the Communist Party as a planned machination by Stalin — his "most brilliant stroke":

"Paying lip-service to the dictatorship of the proletariat, [Stalin] raised the party membership at a single stroke by more than 50 percent, and ended the supremacy of the intellectuals, by recruiting 250,000 'workers from the bench' — men whose primary interest in the party was the security which it gave them in their jobs.... Thereafter the party was clay in the hands of its efficient managers. Argument and discussion in the party ranks no longer played any part in the taking of decisions, and those who by long habit continued to engage in these pastimes were one by one eliminated. The purges of the 1930s were, among other things, Stalin's revenge on the party intellectuals who had once despised him for failing to measure up to their intellectual stature."

In more recent decades, the Lenin Enrollment has been alternatively viewed as an authentic policy response to concern of party leaders about the attenuation of the working class within the Communist Party and a palliative averting the potential of worker unrest. A focused effort was made to reverse this trend toward deproletarianization, it is argued, perhaps with the secondary intention of cementing the party's place in the factories to bolster labor discipline and increase industrial productivity.

In tandem with the "re-proletarianization" effort, it is noted, came an increased emphasis on promotion of workers "from the bench" to positions of factory administration. While this emphasis placed politically reliable individuals in management positions, it had the direct effect of reducing the percentage of workers at the bench in the party by making party membership a direct conduit to management. This phenomenon was substantial, with the party general census of January 1927 revealing that slightly over 300,000 Communist Party members who had joined the organization as workers had later moved to other jobs, typically as white-collar workers or factory administrators.

Historian Sheila Fitzpatrick has made the case that this "second and partially contradictory objective," training workers from the bench into reliable Communist cadres and promoting them into roles in industrial management, was actually judged the more "urgent and important" need by the party. She writes that "faced with the choice between having more Communist workers in the factories and more Communist former workers in the apparatus, the party firmly opted for the latter."

This is not to say that the Lenin Enrollment was devoid of factional functionality. The new crop of worker-communists was indisputably used as a cudgel in the factional battle between the party majority and its Left opposition in the field of higher education, for example, historically a bulwark of the Left's support. Purge commissions were established in 1924 in an effort to remove "social aliens" from universities and higher party schools, filling the positions vacated with less idealistic and more reliable students with proletarian rather than intelligentsia bona fides.

Siegelbaum provided a more nuanced summary of this re-proletarianization campaign of the Communist Party in 1992:

"Taken together, these policies indicate that at the height of NEP a momentous change was occurring within the party and in its relation to the industrial working class. Seeking to overcome the breach between the party and its putative social base, the party elite coopted what it identified as influential and potentially reliable strata of industrial workers.... [These] could be defined as 'agents' in two senses of the word: social activists whose infusion of proletarian blood could revivify the party, and faithful instruments who could structure the aspirations of their fellow but more 'backward' workers into officially sanctioned channels.

"This was the authentic origin of the historic bloc that consisted of the Stalinist secretarial leadership of the party and primarily young, male, and ethnically Russian industrial workers."

== See also ==
- Membership of the Communist Party of the Soviet Union
