= Alexander Vakhrameyev =

Russian painter (1874–1926)

- Александр Иванович Вахрамеев
- Born: March 11, 1874; Vologda Governorate
- Died: March 16, 1926 (aged 52)
- Occupation: painter

Alexander Ivanovich Vakhrameyev (Russian: Александр Иванович Вахрамеев; March 11, 1874 – March 16, 1926) was a painter who operated in the Russian Empire and Soviet Union.

== Biography ==
Alexander Vakhrameyev was born in Vologda Governorate. His father was a churchman.

== Gallery ==
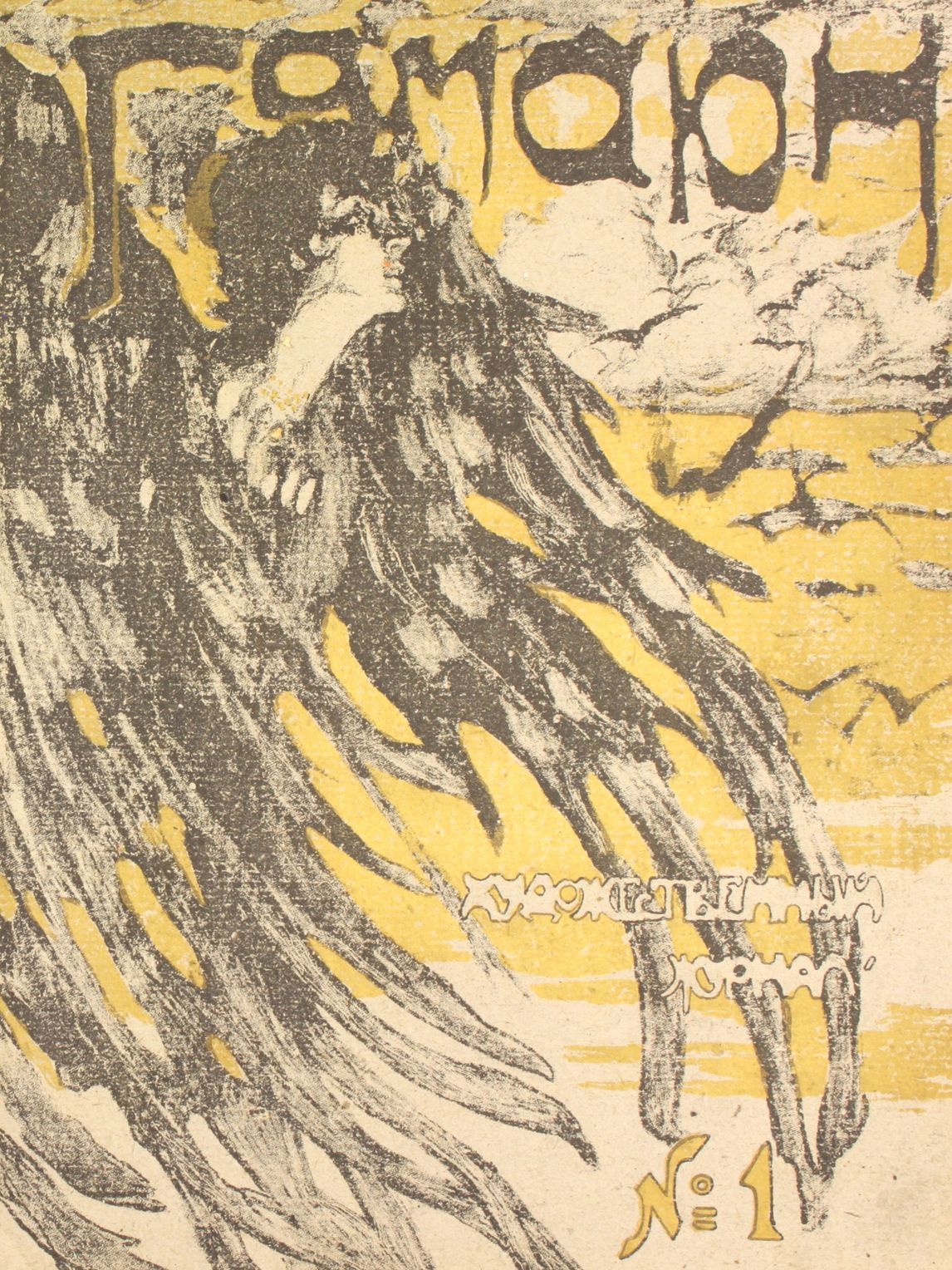

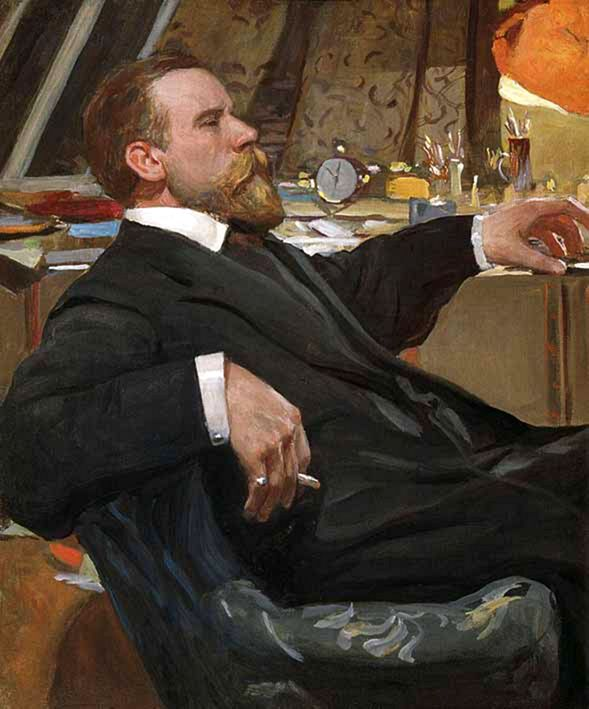
Portrait of Ivan Goryushkin-Sorokopudov, 1900s

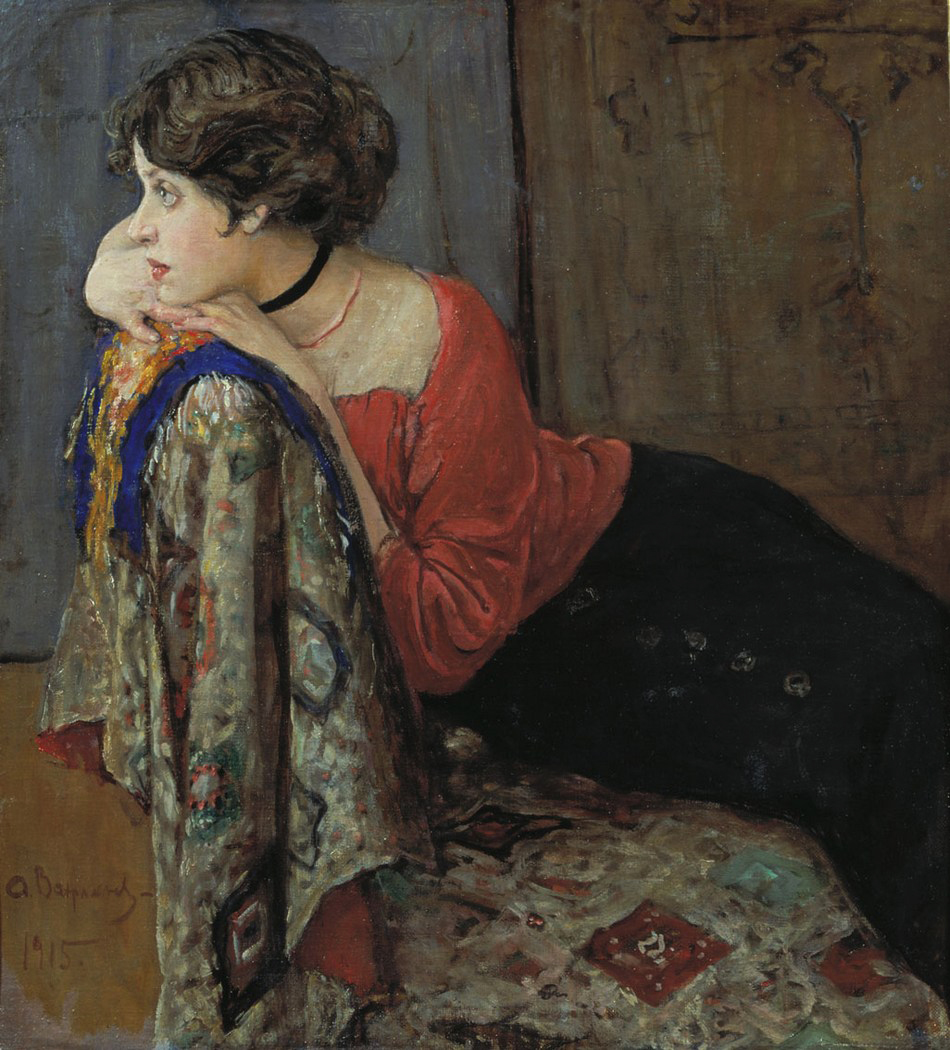
Portrait of T. Trofimova, 1915

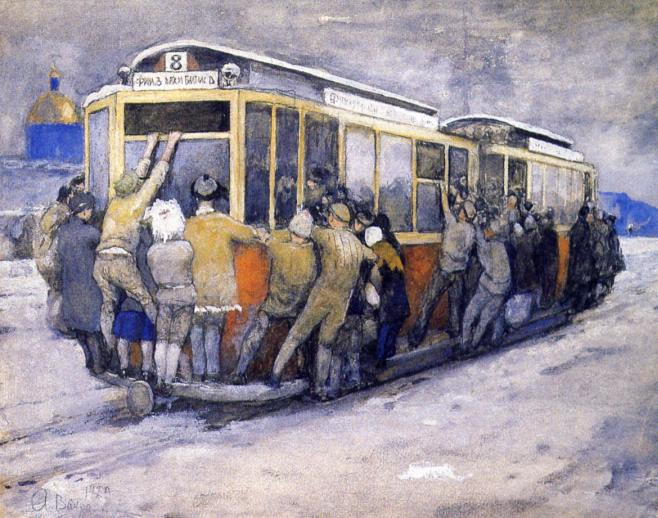

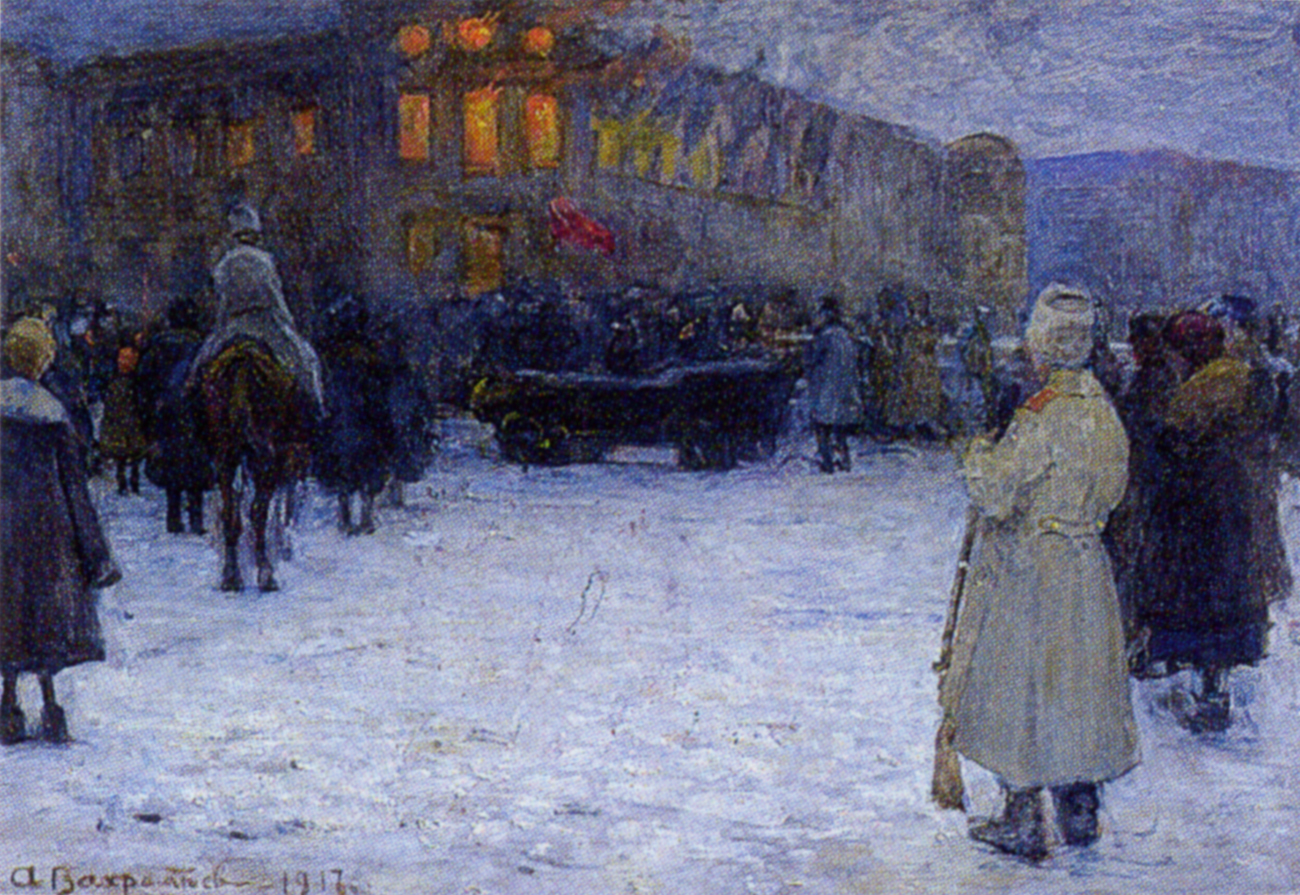
Fire of Litovsky Castle, 1917

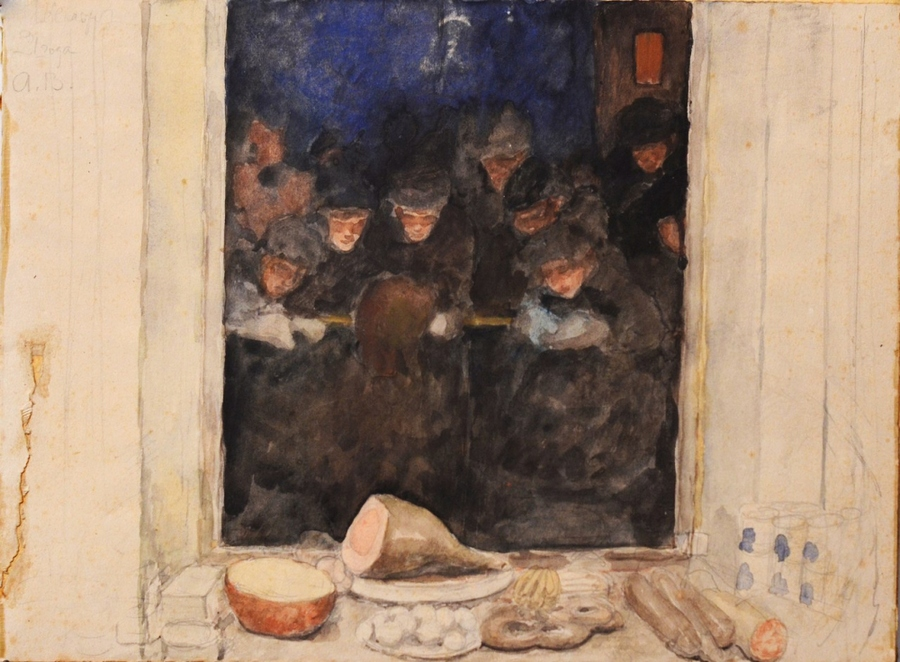

== Bibliography ==
- Каталог выставки картин Общества им. А. И. Куинджи в залах Общества поощрения художеств. Л.: 1927.
- Рощин А. И. Александр Иванович Вахрамеев. М., 1971;
- Рылов А. Воспоминания. Л., 1977.
- Художники народов СССР. Биобиблиографический словарь. Т.2. М.: Искусство, 1972. С. 211.
- Живопись первой половины XX века (А-В) / Государственный Русский музей. СПб.: Palace Editions, 1997.
- Красноборский район Архангельской области. Энциклопедический словарь / Сост. Р. В. Власов. Колас, Архангельская обл., 2009. С. 43. ISBN 978-5-8432-0094-7.
