= 1990 in fine arts of the Soviet Union =

The year 1990 was marked by many events that left an imprint on the history of Soviet and Russian Fine Arts.

== Events ==
- Exhibition of works by Vecheslav Zagonek was opened in the Museum of the Academy of Arts in Leningrad.
- Painter Eugene Maltsev was elected chairman of the Leningrad Union of Artists, heading it until 1997.
- Traditional exhibition of Leningrad artists - veterans of the Great Patriotic War was opened in May in the Leningrad Union of Artists.
- Exhibition of works by Abram Grushko (1918–1980) was opened in the Leningrad Union of Artists.
- Painter Oleg Eremeev was elected a head of the Repin Institute of Arts.
- Exhibition of works by Ivan Savenko (1924–1987) was opened in the Central House of Artists in Moscow.
- Exhibition of works by 26 Moscow and Leningrad artists was opened in the Leningrad Union of Artists. The participants were Evgenia Antipova, Victor Teterin, Valery Vatenin, Yaroslav Krestovsky, Boris Shamanov, Leonid Tkachenko, German Yegoshin, Vitaly Tulenev, and other artists.
- In Paris, France, successfully passed the new exhibitions and art auctions of Russian paintings L'École de Leningrad. The participants were Evgenia Antipova, Sergei Babkov, Nikolai Baskakov, Zlata Bizova, Olga Bogaevskaya, Lev Bogomolets, Dmitry Buchkin, Piotr Buchkin, Sergei Frolov, Ivan Godlevsky, Abram Grushko, Mikhail Kaneev, Mikhail Kozell, Marina Kozlovskaya, Engels Kozlov, Maya Kopitseva, Boris Korneev, Elena Kostenko, Boris Lavrenko, Anatoli Levitin, Oleg Lomakin, Dmitry Maevsky, Gavriil Malish, Samuil Nevelshtein, Dmitry Oboznenko, Victor Oreshnikov, Victor Otiev, Vladimir Ovchinnikov, Vecheslav Ovchinnikov, Filaret Pakun, Alexander Pushnin, Alexander Romanychev, Lev Russov, Alexander Samokhvalov, Gleb Savinov, Vladimir Sakson, Arseny Semionov, Alexander Shmidt, Igor Skorobogatov, Alexander Tatarenko, German Tatarinov, Victor Teterin, Nikolai Timkov, Mikhail Trufanov, Igor Veselkin, Rostislav Vovkushevsky, Vecheslav Zagonek, and other important Leningrad artists.

== Deaths ==
- January 30 — Nina Niss-Goldman (Russian: Нина Ильинична Нисс-Гольдман), Russian soviet painter, sculptor and a teacher of Jewish origin that was one of the founding members of the Society of Artists 'The Four Arts' (1924-1931, Moscow) (born 1892).
- May 15 — Porfiry Krylov (Russian: Крылов Порфирий Никитич), Russian soviet painter and graphic artist, People's Artist of the USSR, Stalin Prize winner, Lenin Prize winner (born 1902).
- May 26 — Varlen Pen (Russian: Пен Варлен), Soviet Korean painter (born 1914).
- June 1 — Natalia Tkachenko (Russian: Ткаченко Наталия Александровна), Russian soviet painter (born 1908).
- June 22 — Marat Podoksin (Russian: Подоксин Марат Григорьевич), Russian soviet painter (born 1930).
- July 4 — Pavel Utkin (Russian: Уткин Павел Петрович), Russian soviet painter (born 1920).
- August 2 — Vladilen Nikiforov (Russian: Никифоров Владилен Алексеевич), Russian soviet painter (born 1930).
- August 6 — Baqi Urmançe (Russian: Урманче Баки Идрисович), Tatar soviet painter, sculptor, and graphic artist, People's Artist of the RSFSR (born 1897).
- August 30 — Timofey Ksenofontov (Russian: Ксенофонтов Тимофей Тванович), Russian soviet painter (born 1912).
- October 24 — Boris Maluev (Russian: Малуев Борис Яковлевич), Russian soviet painter and graphic artist (born 1929).
- November 7 — Stepan Privedentsev (Russian: Привиденцев Степан Иванович), Russian soviet painter (born 1916).
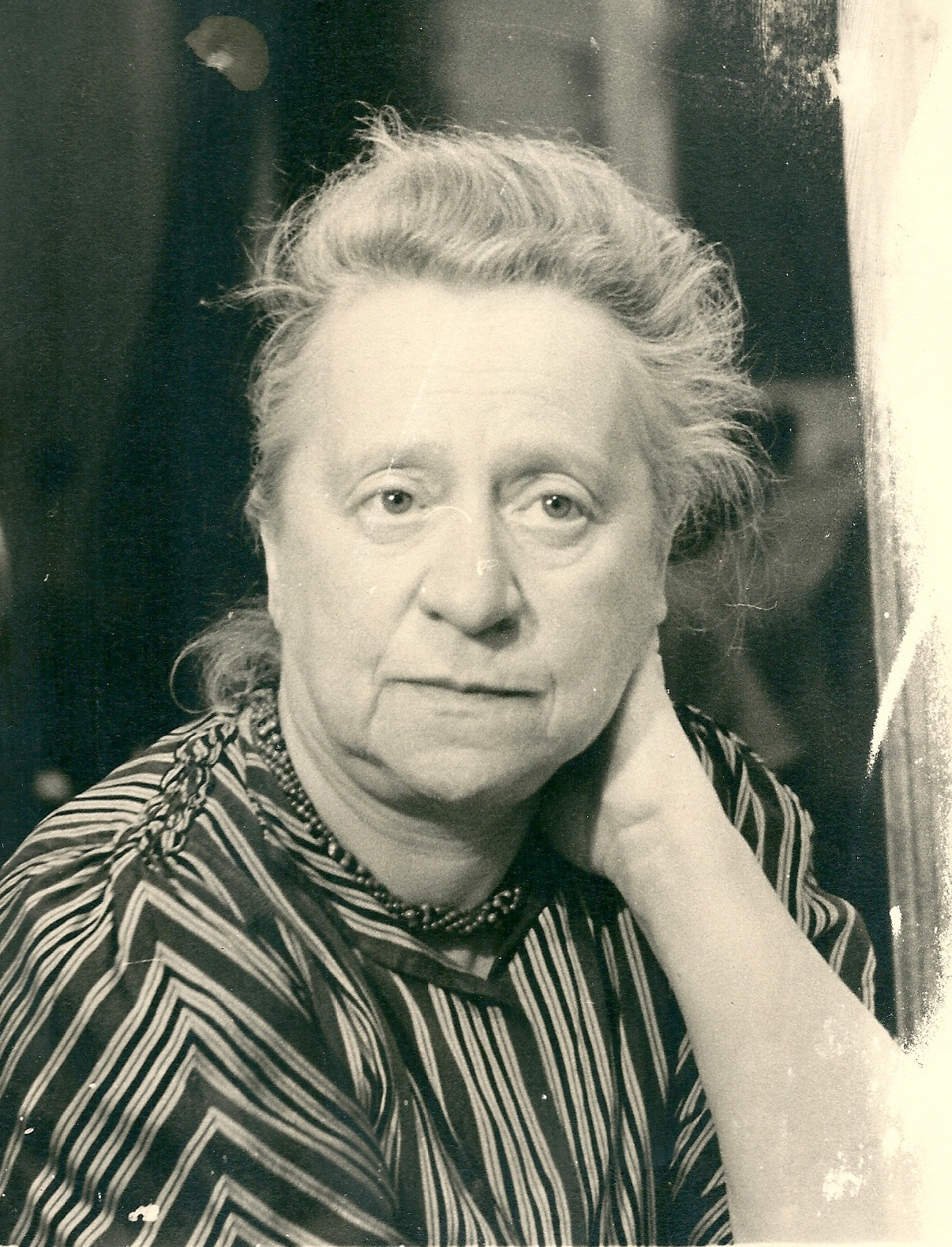
Nina Niss-Goldman

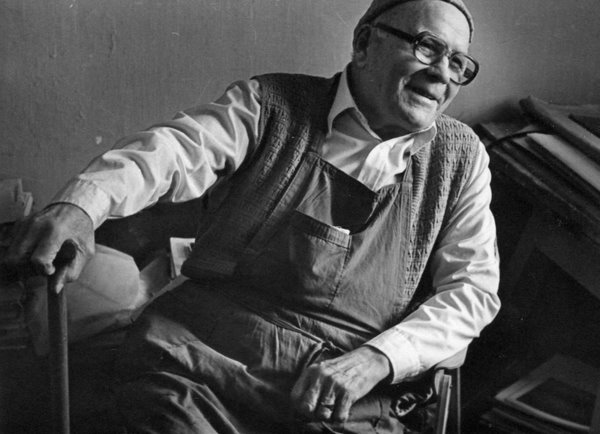
Baqi Urmançe

== See also ==
- List of Russian artists
- List of painters of Leningrad Union of Artists
- Saint Petersburg Union of Artists
- Russian culture

== Sources ==
- Вячеслав Францевич Загонек. Выставка произведений. Каталог. Л., Музей АХ СССР, 1990.
- Абрам Борисович Грушко. Выставка произведений. Л., ЛОСХ, 1990.
- Выставка произведений художников-ветеранов Великой Отечественной войны. Каталог. Л., Художник РСФСР, 1990.
- Иван Григорьевич Савенко. Живопись. Рисунок. Каталог выставки. М., Советский художник, 1990.
- Выставка произведений 26 ленинградских и московских художников. Каталог. Л., Художник РСФСР, 1990.
- L' École de Leningrad. Catalogue. Paris, Drouot Richelieu. 1990, 12 Mars.
- L' École de Leningrad. Catalogue. Paris, Drouot Richelieu. 1990, 11 June.
- L' École de Leningrad. Catalogue. Paris, Drouot Richelieu. 1990, 21 December.
- Artists of Peoples of the USSR. Biography Dictionary. Vol. 1. Moscow, Iskusstvo, 1970.
- Artists of Peoples of the USSR. Biography Dictionary. Vol. 2. Moscow, Iskusstvo, 1972.
- Directory of Members of Union of Artists of USSR. Volume 1,2. Moscow, Soviet Artist Edition, 1979.
- Directory of Members of the Leningrad branch of the Union of Artists of Russian Federation. Leningrad, Khudozhnik RSFSR, 1980.
- Artists of Peoples of the USSR. Biography Dictionary. Vol. 4 Book 1. Moscow, Iskusstvo, 1983.
- Directory of Members of the Leningrad branch of the Union of Artists of Russian Federation. - Leningrad: Khudozhnik RSFSR, 1987.
- Artists of peoples of the USSR. Biography Dictionary. Vol. 4 Book 2. - Saint Petersburg: Academic project humanitarian agency, 1995.
- Link of Times: 1932 - 1997. Artists - Members of Saint Petersburg Union of Artists of Russia. Exhibition catalogue. - Saint Petersburg: Manezh Central Exhibition Hall, 1997.
- Matthew C. Bown. Dictionary of 20th Century Russian and Soviet Painters 1900-1980s. - London: Izomar, 1998.
- Vern G. Swanson. Soviet Impressionism. - Woodbridge, England: Antique Collectors' Club, 2001.
- Время перемен. Искусство 1960—1985 в Советском Союзе. СПб., Государственный Русский музей, 2006.
- Sergei V. Ivanov. Unknown Socialist Realism. The Leningrad School. - Saint-Petersburg: NP-Print Edition, 2007. - ISBN 5-901724-21-6, ISBN 978-5-901724-21-7.
- Anniversary Directory graduates of Saint Petersburg State Academic Institute of Painting, Sculpture, and Architecture named after Ilya Repin, Russian Academy of Arts. 1915 - 2005. - Saint Petersburg: Pervotsvet Publishing House, 2007.
