= 1930 in the Soviet Union =

- Decades: 1920s; 1930s; 1940s; 1950s
- See also: History of the Soviet Union; List of years in the Soviet Union

The following lists events that happened during 1930 in the Union of Soviet Socialist Republics.

== Incumbents ==
- General Secretary of the Communist Party of the Soviet Union – Joseph Stalin
- Chairman of the Central Executive Committee of the Congress of Soviets – Mikhail Kalinin
- Chairman of the Council of People's Commissars of the Soviet Union – Alexei Rykov (until 19 December), Vyacheslav Molotov (starting 19 December)

== Events ==
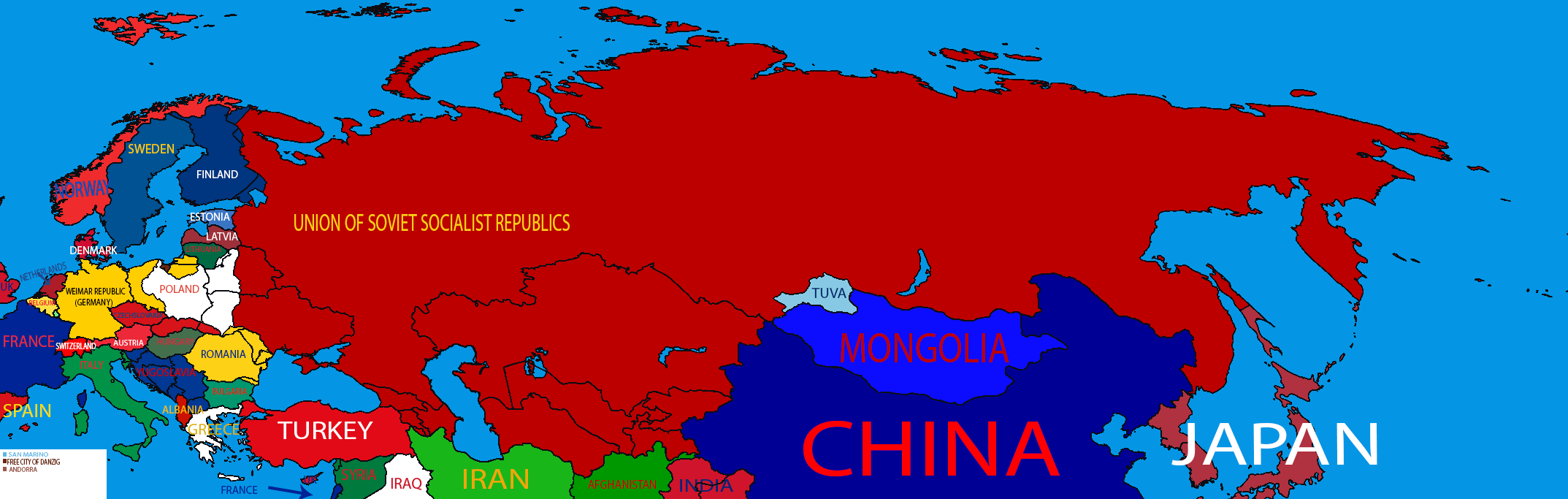
A map showing the territory of the Union of Soviet Socialist Republics

=== June ===
- 26 June – 13 July – 16th Congress of the All-Union Communist Party (Bolsheviks).

=== November ===
- 25 November – 7 December – The Industrial Party Trial is held.

== Births ==
- 1 January – Zhanna Kolodub, Ukrainian composer and teacher (d. 2025)
- 9 January
  - Pavel Kolchin, cross-country skier (d. 2010)
  - Igor Netto, footballer (d. 1999)
- 14 January – Khoshbakht Yusifzadeh, Azerbaijani scientist and businessman (d. 2023)
- 26 February – Vladimir Kesarev, footballer
- 15 March – Mariya Orlyk, teacher and politician
- 10 April – Vladimir Yerokhin, footballer (d. 1996)
- 16 April – Fyodor Bogdanovsky, Olympic weightlifter
- 19 May – Leonid Kharitonov, actor
- 31 May – Ruslan Stratonovich, Russian physicist and engineer (d. 1997)
- 29 June – Anatoli Maslyonkin, footballer
- 10 July – Dmitry Oboznenko, painter
- 21 September – Sergei Popov, Olympic athlete
- 7 October – Yuri Dubinin, diplomat (d. 2013)
- 10 October – Medea Amiranashvili, Georgian soprano (d. 2023)
- 21 October – Ivan Silayev, politician (d. 2023)
- 8 December – Tofig Bakikhanov, Azerbaijani composer (d. 2026)
- 29 December – Vladimir Ryzhkin, footballer (d. 2011)
- 31 December – Anatoly Borisovich Kuznetsov, actor

== Deaths ==
- 14 April – Vladimir Mayakovsky, poet (born 1893)

== See also ==
- 1930 in fine arts of the Soviet Union
- List of Soviet films of 1930
