= 1990 in art =

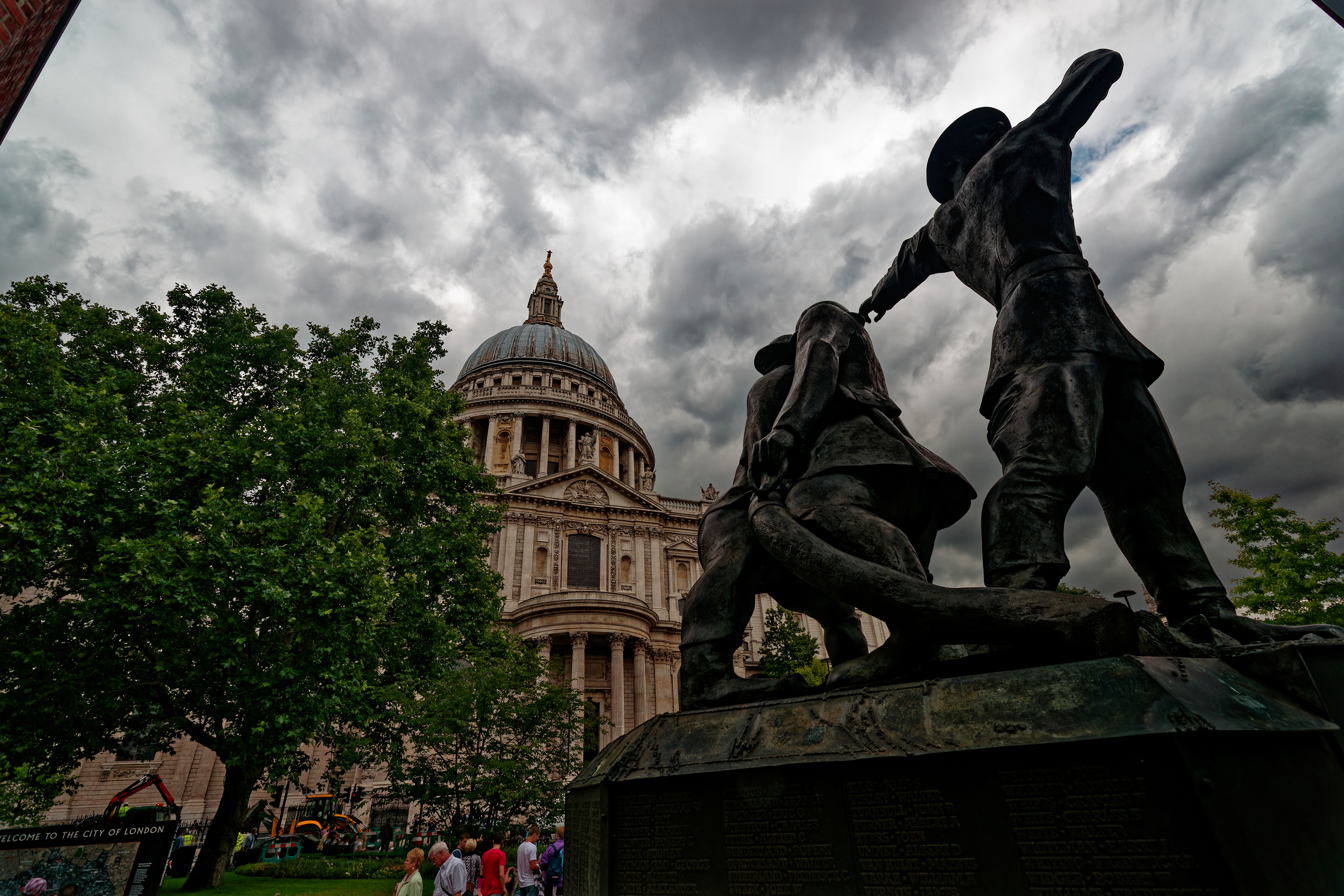
National Firefighters Memorial by John Williams Mills

Events from the year 1990 in art.

== Events ==
- 18 March – Isabella Stewart Gardner Museum theft: Twelve paintings, collectively worth from $100 to $300 million, are stolen from the Isabella Stewart Gardner Museum in Boston, Massachusetts by two thieves posing as police officers. This is the largest art theft in United States history and the largest-value theft of private property in world history, and the paintings (as of 2019) have not been recovered.
- 6 April – Robert Mapplethorpe's "The Perfect Moment" show of nude and homosexual photographs opens at the Cincinnati Contemporary Art Centre, in spite of accusations of indecency by Citizens for Community Values.
- 15 May – Portrait of Doctor Gachet by Vincent van Gogh is sold for a record $82.5 million.
- East Side Gallery, 105 paintings by 129 artists from 20 countries, is painted on the east side of the Berlin Wall in Germany following its abandonment. It includes Dmitri Vrubel's My God, Help Me to Survive This Deadly Love and Birgit Kinder's Test the Best (renamed Test the Rest after restoration).
- John Keane is commissioned by the British Imperial War Museum as an official war artist in the Gulf War.

== Exhibitions ==
- British Art Show at Hayward Gallery includes work by Young British Artists
- Jim Gary's Twentieth Century Dinosaurs opened on April 12, 1990, the only solo exhibition by a sculptor at the Smithsonian Institution's National Museum of Natural History in Washington, D.C., that drew a record number of visitors to the museum

== Works ==
- Arman - Hope for Peace Monument (sculpture in Yarze, Lebanon)
- Eduardo Chillida - Peine Del Viento XVII –
- Robert Coburn - Bell Circles II (sound installation, Portland, Oregon) –
- Elisabeth Frink - Desert Quartet (sculpture, Worthing, England) –
- Douglas Gordon - Meaning and Location
- Damien Hirst - A Thousand Years
- Howard Hodgkin - After Degas
- Tadeusz Kantor - September Defeat
- Lee Kelly with Michael Stirling - Friendship Circle (installation, Portland, Oregon) –
- Eric Larsen - Packy mural (Portland, Oregon) –
- Patricia Meyerowitz - Easton Ellipse (sculpture now permanently installed on the Karl Stirner Arts Trail in Easton, Pennsylvania)
- Patrick Morelli - Behold (statue, Atlanta, Georgia) –
- Victor Salmones - Cancer, There Is Hope (bronze, Houston, Texas)
- Shamim Sikder - Shoparjito Shadhinota (En: Self Earned Freedom) at Dhaka University in Dhaka, Bangladesh
- Rachel Whiteread - Ghost
- Sue Williamson - For Thirty Years Next to His Heart (Forty-nine photocopies in artist-designed frames)

== Awards ==
- Turner Prize – No prize was offered because of lack of sponsorship.

== Films ==
- Vincent and Me

== Deaths ==
=== January–June ===
- January – Daniel du Janerand, French painter, sad and devastating death (b. 1919)
- 15 January - Henrietta Berk, 81. American painter (b. 1919)
- 22 January – Roman Vishniac, Russian-American photographer (b. 1897)
- 15 February – Norman Parkinson, English fashion photographer (b. 1913)
- 16 February – Keith Haring, American artist and social activist (b. 1958)
- 15 March – Jim Ede, English art collector (b. 1895)
- 21 April – Romain de Tirtoff, Russian-born French artist and designer (b. 1892)
- May – Fuller Potter, American Abstract expressionist artist (b. 1910)
- 30 June – Jacques Lob, French comic book creator (b. 1932)

=== July–December ===
- 18 July – Yves Chaland, French cartoonist (b. 1957)
- 23 July – Pierre Gandon, French illustrator and engraver of postage stamps (b. 1899)
- 25 July – Leonard Bahr, American portrait and mural painter (b. 1905)
- 14 October – Clifton Pugh, Australian artist (b. 1924)
- 26 October – Joan Brown, American figurative painter (b. 1938)
- 7 December – Jean Paul Lemieux, Canadian-American painter (b. 1904)
- 8 December – Tadeusz Kantor, Polish painter, assemblage artist, set designer and theatre director (b. 1915)
- 23 December – Serge Danot, French animator (b. 1931)
- 28 December – Ed van der Elsken, Dutch photographer (b. 1925)
- 29 December – David Piper, English curator and novelist (b. 1918)

== See also ==
- 1990 in fine arts of the Soviet Union
