= 1929 in the Soviet Union =

- Decades: 1920s; 1930s; 1940s
- See also: History of the Soviet Union; List of years in the Soviet Union

The following lists events that happened during 1929 in the Union of Soviet Socialist Republics.

== Incumbents ==
- General Secretary of the Communist Party of the Soviet Union – Joseph Stalin
- Chairman of the Central Executive Committee of the Congress of Soviets – Mikhail Kalinin
- Chairman of the Council of People's Commissars of the Soviet Union – Alexei Rykov

== Events ==
=== February ===
- 9 February – Litvinov's Pact is signed.
- 17 February – The Case of the Union of Liberation of Belarus begins.

=== May ===
- 1 May – 1929 Kopet Dag earthquake

=== July ===
- 22 July – 9 September – Sino-Soviet conflict (1929)

== Births ==
- 11 January – Dmitri Bruns, Estonian architect (d. 2020)
- 14 January – Vladimir Kondrashin, basketball coach (d. 1999)
- 23 January – Filaret Denysenko, Ukrainian religious leader (d. 2026)
- 30 March – Ilya Piatetski-Shapiro, mathematician (d. 2009)
- 18 May – Halyna Sevruk, artist (d. 2022)
- 21 May – Boris Seidenberg, actor
- 5 June – Sergo Mikoyan, historian
- 7 July – Yakov Lyubarsky, scholar
- 18 August – Anatoly Kuznetsov, writer
- 23 September – Viktor Sarianidi, archaeologist (d. 2013)
- 28 September – Nikolai Ryzhkov, politician (d. 2024)
- 15 October – Nikodim, Soviet Russian Orthodox metropolitan (d. 1978)
- 22 October – Lev Yashin, footballer
- 22 November – Maksuma Melikova, Azerbaijani legal scientist
- 15 December – Yuri Vasilyevich Prokhorov, mathematician
- 23 December – Antonina Seredina, Olympic canoeist

== Deaths ==
- 11 January – Yakov Slashchov, White Army general (born 1885)
- 18 March – Hamza Hakimzade Niyazi, Uzbek author, composer, playwright, poet, scholar, and political activist (born 1889)
- not earlier than 15 April – Panteleimon Belochub, Ukrainian soldier (born 1892)

== See also ==
- 1929 in fine arts of the Soviet Union
- List of Soviet films of 1929
