= Ryndzyun hydropathic =

- Водолечебница Рындзюна (Russian)
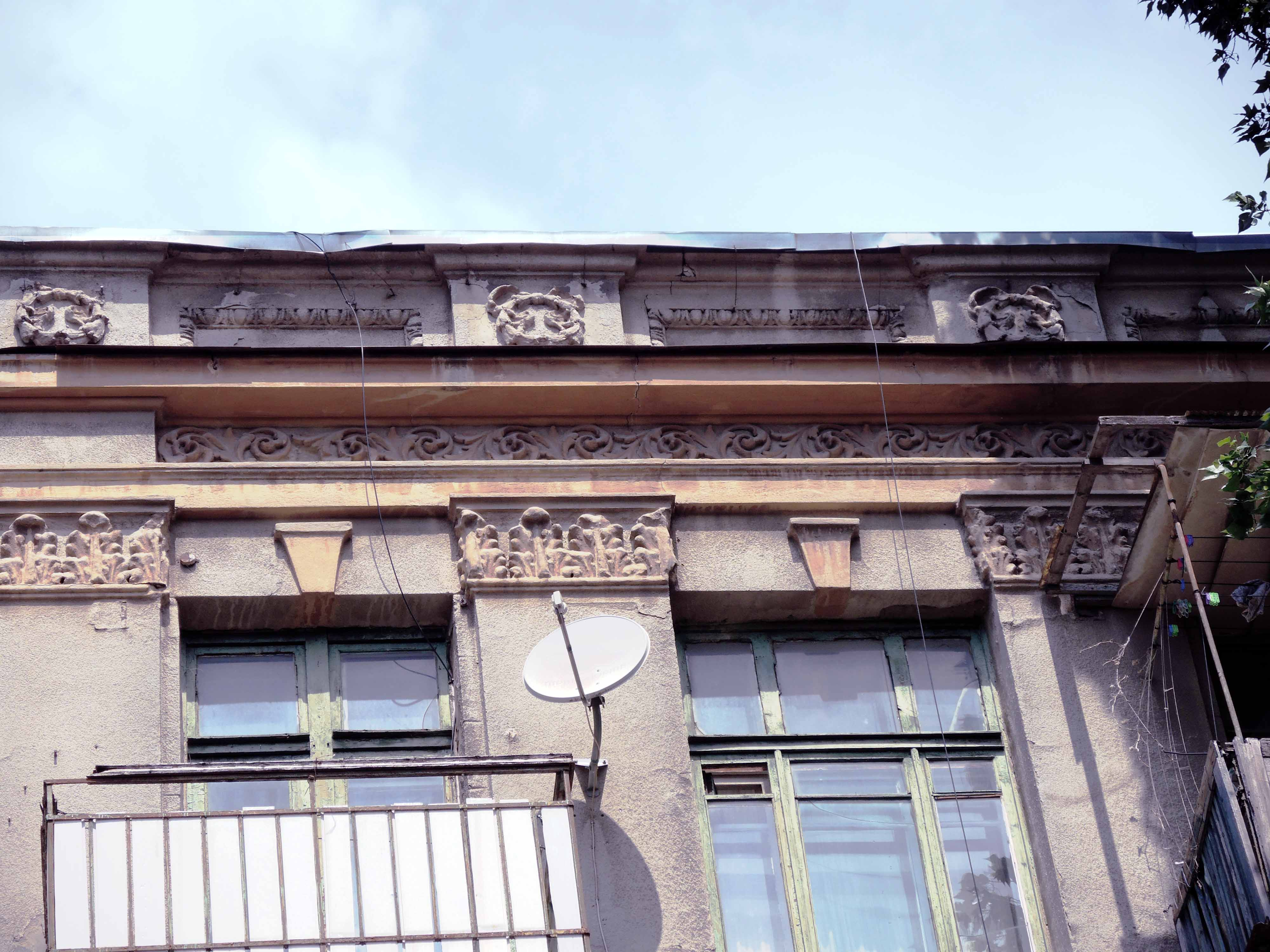

- Location within Russia
- Type: House and Museum
- Location: Rostov on Don, Russia

History
- Built: 1885

Site notes
- Architect: Ilya Gilelevich Ryndzyun
- Architectural style: southern Russian eclecticism

Ryndzyun hydropathic (Russian: Водолечебница Рындзюна) is a mansion in which a doctor Ilya Gilelevich Ryndzyun organized the first hydropathic institution in the city at the end of the 19th century. It is located on the Socialist street, 94 in the Kirov district of Rostov-on-Don. The house was of historical and architectural value, but eventually became in a critical condition, and then was completely demolished in 2014.

== History ==
Matilda Rindzyun has got the three-storied mansion on Nikolskaya Street of that time, 92 in Rostov-on-Don in which in 1895 her husband Ilya Ryndzyun has opened the city's first hydropathic. It carried out light therapy and water therapy of patients. The doctor called his methods "rational hydrotherapy" which in Rostov of that time was absolutely new phenomenon.

Doctor Ilya Ryndzyun moved to Rostov-on-Don from St. Petersburg, he received his professional education at the Imperial Military Medical Academy. Despite the novelty of the methods, the Ryndzyun hydropathic became popular among citizens in narrow time frames. The range of procedures was gradually expanded: the hydro-massage, medical and health-improving baths were supplemented with light therapy. In 1901, Ilya Ryndziun published his own book about methods of treatment and it was immediately sold out. There are reasons to believe that the writer Anton Pavlovich Chekhov also visited the Ryndzyun hydropathic during visits to Rostov-on-Don.

In this three-story house grew the children of Ilya Ryndzhyun, two of whom became famous. His daughter Nina Niss-Goldman became a famous sculptor, and his son Vladimir emigrated, worked abroad as a journalist and writer. In the book dated 1912 this house was called "Hydropathic institution and light-healing hospital of Dr. Ryndzyun".

In 1917 before revolution, the Ryndzyun family sold this house to the Cossacks of Don Host - the brothers Korolkov. After 1917 the building was equipped with communal apartments. Until 2004, the former hydropathic institution was listed in the guard register of the Ministry of Culture as an object of history and culture of regional importance. Then there was the information that the buildings must demolish or save. In 2009-2010, was held protests against the demolition of the house. After that in 2012 the building was put up for auction, but the auction was not ultimately carried out, though the house had to be sold with the condition of preserving the historic facade. As of 2013, the house was in a critical condition. In 2014, the hydropathic was privatized and then it was demolished. The building was carried out manually.

== Description ==
Ryndzyun's house was built in the style of the southern Russian eclecticism which was lost over time. The key element of the facade decoration was stucco molding which was a lot. On the first two floors of the house there was a clinic and on the third there lived a doctor with his wife and four children. The facade of the house was decorated with a brick, which was produced by the manufacturer Epifanov who was the owner of a profitable brick manufactory. All the bricks at his enterprise were made by the method of manual molding. Not only the demolished house represented historical and cultural value, but also the site and the area where the former hydropathic institution was located.
