= Mezhova =

Rural locality in Dnipropetrovsk Oblast, Ukraine

Mezhova Межова
- Rural settlement
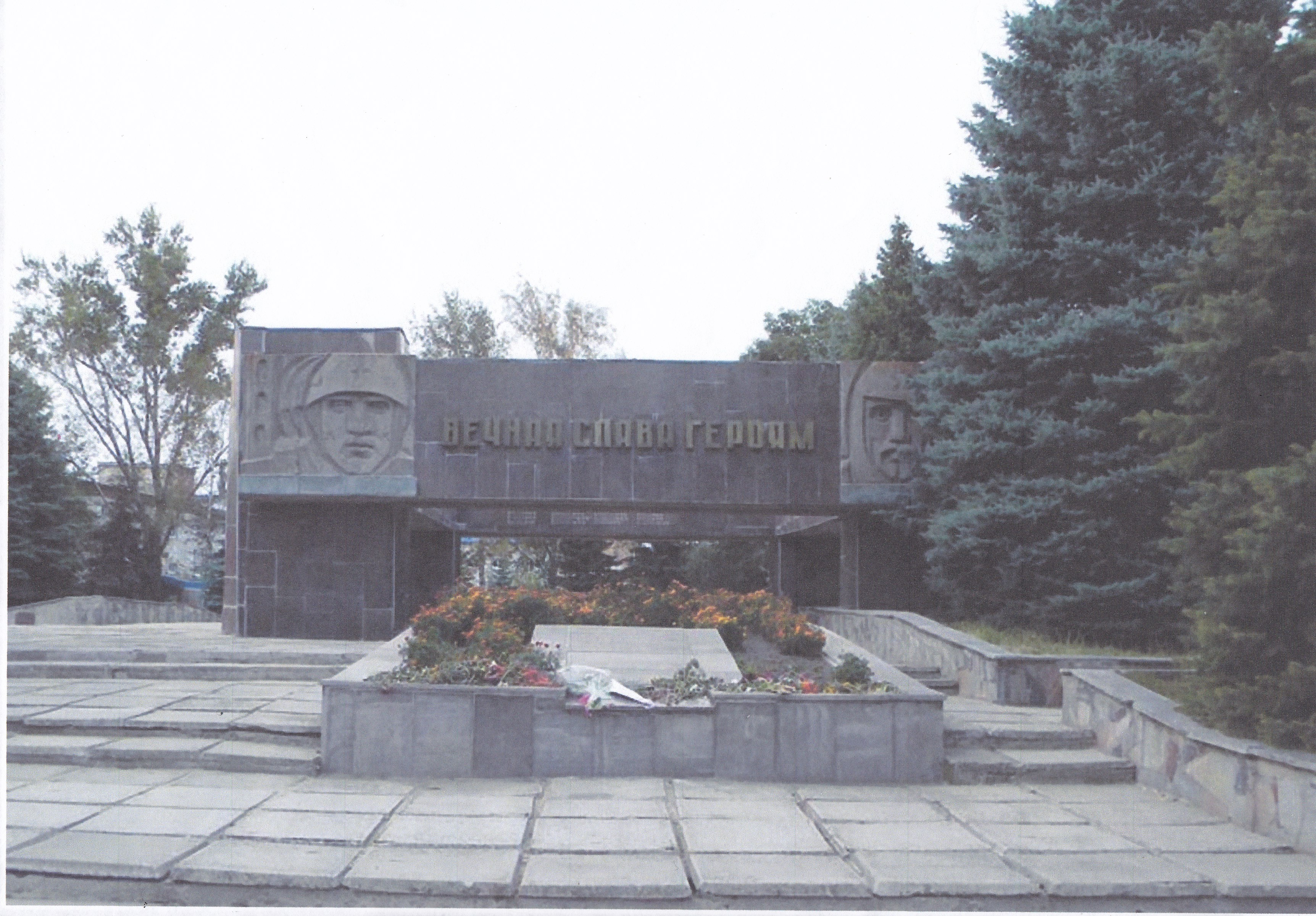
- Memorial of the fallen soldiers in the Second World War in Mezhova.

- Location within Dnipropetrovsk Oblast Location within Ukraine
- Coordinates: 48°15′17″N 36°43′22″E
- Country: Ukraine
- Oblast: Dnipropetrovsk Oblast
- Raion: Synelnykove Raion
- Hromada: Mezhova settlement hromada

Population (2022)
  - Total: 7,022
- Time zone: UTC+2 (EET)
  - Summer (DST): UTC+3 (EEST)

Mezhova (Ukrainian: Межова; Russian: Межевая) is a rural settlement in Synelnykove Raion, Dnipropetrovsk Oblast, Ukraine. It hosts the administration of Mezhova settlement hromada, one of the hromadas of Ukraine. The settlement has population around 7,022 (2022 estimate).

== Geography ==
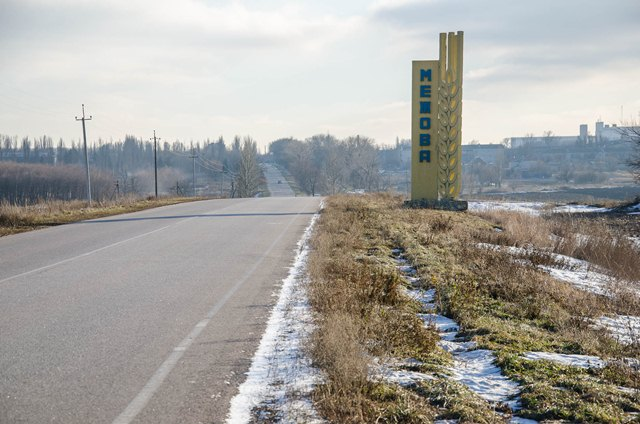
Sign at the entrance to the town of Mezhova.

The village of Mezhova is located in the east of the region, 160 km from the regional center, 120 km from the district center and 80 km from Donetsk, in the steppe zone near the sources of the Kamyanka river. The nearest settlements are the villages of Zaporizhzke (0.5 km) and Novolozuvativka (1 km). The territorial highways Autoroute T0406, Autoroute T0428 and the railway line Chaplyne—Pokrovsk, on which the station of the same name is located, run through the village.

In the Mezhova area, the spurs of the Donetsk Upland begin, altitude above sea level in the village is around 170–180 meters.

== History ==
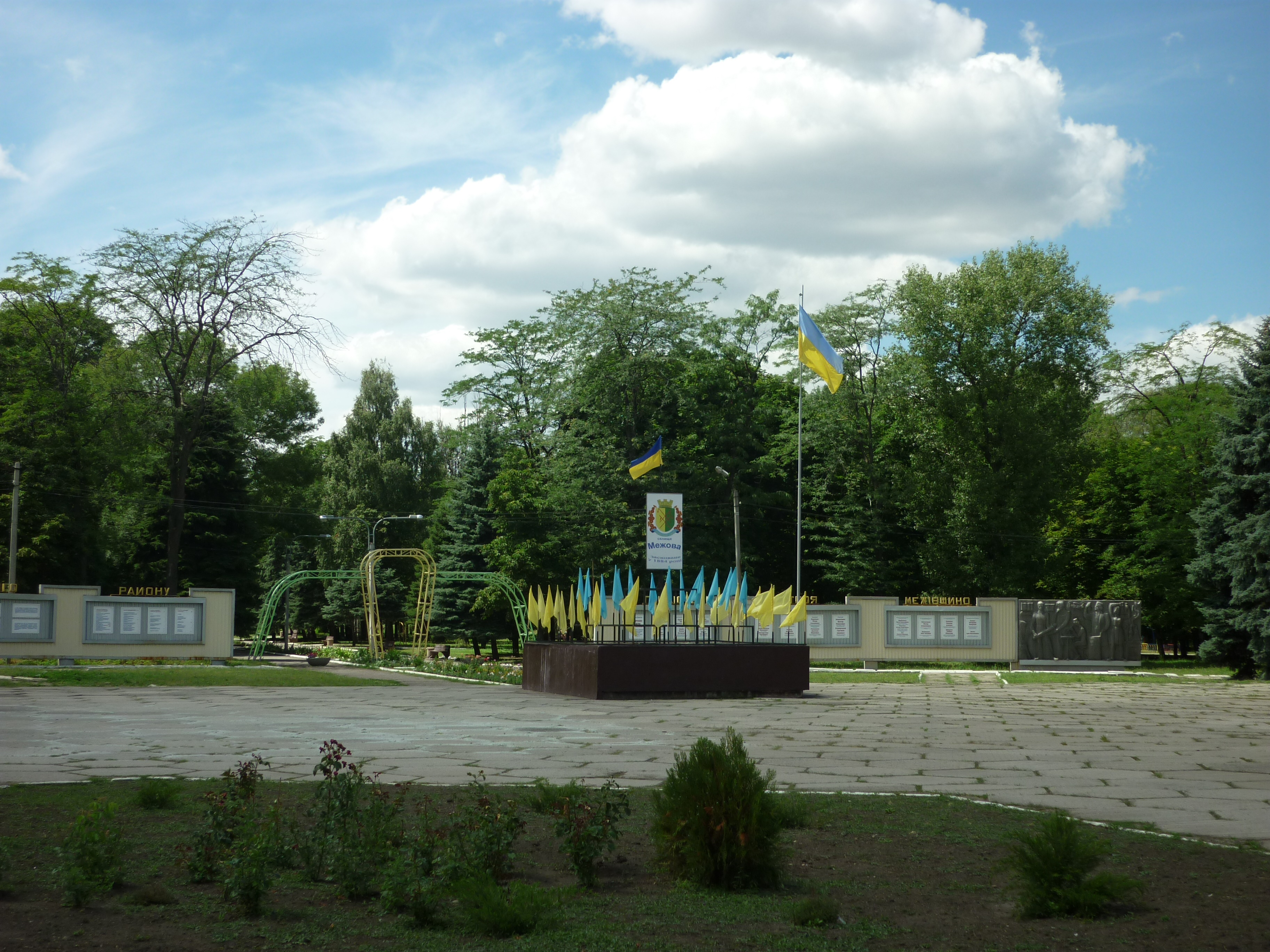
Central square in Mezhova.

Settlement of the area on the territory of the modern village began with the construction in 1884 of the Mezhova station on the Yuzivka—Yaterynoslav railway. In the 1890s of the 19th century, the lands located northwest of the station began to be settled by immigrants from the village of Slovyanka. Thus the hamlet of Novoslovyanka arose. North of the Mezhova station, immigrants from the village of Pidhorodne founded the village of Hryhorivka. At the beginning of the 20th century, industrial enterprises arose in the village, mainly processing agricultural raw materials — two steam mills, an oil press, a foundry, a leather workshop and a factory for repairing agricultural machinery.

As of 1913, there were 193 households and 1,191 inhabitants in Hryhorivka, and 412 people lived in 72 courtyards in the Novoslavianka farm. A church-parish and zemstvo school operated in Hryhorivka.

In January 1920, Hryhorivka, Novoslavianka and the Mezhova station were captured by Red Army units. Several more families of Pidgorodnei immigrants moved south of the station. They founded the village of Kamyanka. In 1923, the Mezhova Raion was formed, the center of which was Hryhorivka. At the beginning of 1925, the total population of the three villages — Hryhorivka, Novoslovyanka, and Kamyanka—was 2,978 people. Hryhorivka had two schools —a primary school and a seven-year school. In the 1930s, a hospital and 6 kindergartens were opened.

During the collectivization, collective farms were created in these villages. As of 1929, the Frunze collective farm operated in Hryhorivka, the Budyonny collective farm in Kamyanka, and the 15th anniversary Red Army in Novoslovyanka. All of them controlled everything edible by the beginning of 1932, which allowed the communists to organize the Holodomor. In the village of Hryhorivka during the communist rule, Vladimir Semichasny, the head of the KGB of the USSR, was born. The office he headed made efforts to conceal the crimes of the Holodomor, although among his relatives there were those who died of starvation.

From 14 October 1941 to 10 September 1943, during the German-Soviet War, the village was temporarily occupied by German-fascist invaders. After the war, the collective farms were consolidated—they were united into one with the central estate in Hryhorivka. In December 1957, the villages of Hryhorivka, Kam'yanka and Novoslov'yanka were united into one settlement — the urban-type settlement of Mezhova.

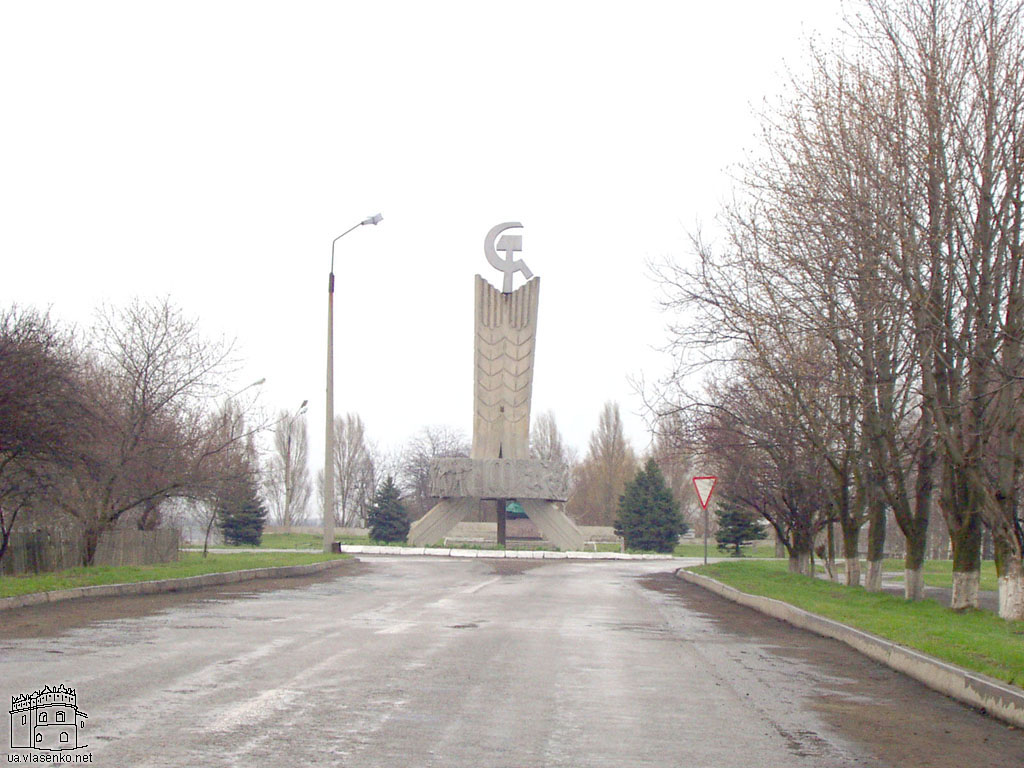
Memorial sign on the occasion of the 100th anniversary of the founding of Mezhova.

On 14 February 2017, during the decentralization, the Mezhova settlement hromada was formed. Until 18 July 2020, Mezhova was the administrative center of Mezhova Raion. The raion was abolished in July 2020 as part of the administrative reform of Ukraine, which reduced the number of raions of Dnipropetrovsk Oblast to seven. The area of Mezhova Raion was merged into Synelnykove Raion.

Until 26 January 2024, Mezhova was designated urban-type settlement. On this day, a new law entered into force which abolished this status, and Mezhova became a rural settlement.

=== Russo-Ukrainian War ===
On 16 August 2023, a Russian missile attack on the settlement killed an 18-year-old man and injured 6 people, according to Serhiy Lysak, governor of Dnipropetrovsk Oblast. The Russian military claimed that its missile attack destroyed a Ukrainian military train carrying ammunition.

On 13 July 2025, at night, the Russian forces attacked the village of Mezhova, as a result of the hits, the roof and the second floor of one of the educational institutions caught fire, as well as a partially destroyed outbuilding. Destruction is on the territory of one of the enterprises, a private house, 2 combines and several cars were damaged. As early as 8 August 2025, according to local media, the ATB supermarket was closed due to shelling. Aurora, "Eva" and others also closed.

== Demographics ==
As of the 2001 Ukrainian census, the settlement had a population of 8,049 people. The native language composition was as follows:

First languages in Mezhova
	percent
Ukrainian	95.7%
Russian	3.5%
Belarusian	0.2%
Armenian	0.1%
others	0.5%

== Economy ==
=== Enterprises ===
- Mezhivskyi Bread Products Plant.
- Mezhivskyi Cheese Factory.
- LLC "Renklod" — produces canned goods, oil, cereals.
- LLC "Mezhivske".
- FG "Malovichko".

=== Transportation ===
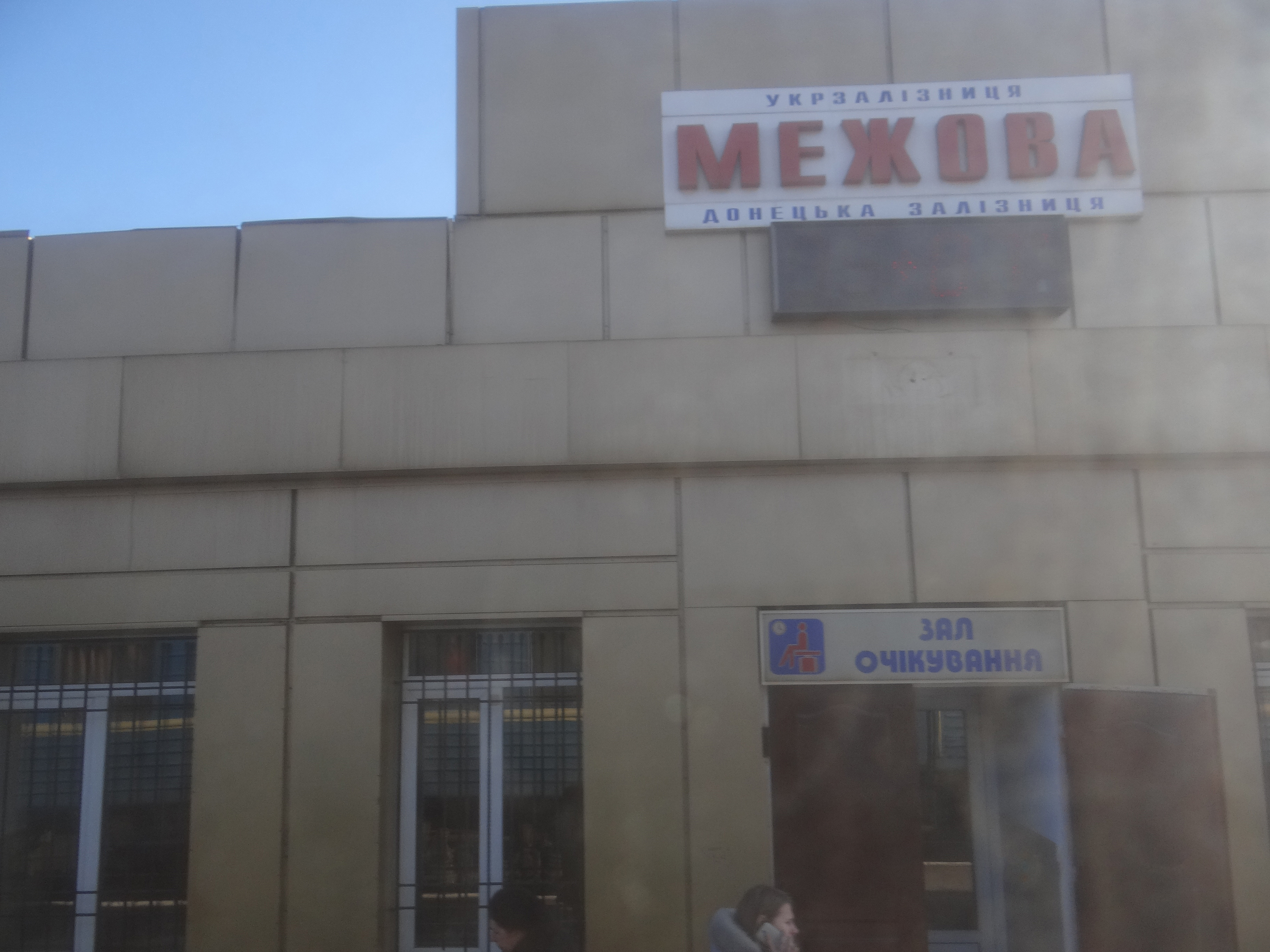
Train station in Mezhova.

Mezhova is on the road which connects Pokrovsk with Vasylkivka. It also has access to the M04 highway, connecting Pokrovsk with Dnipro and Kryvyi Rih.

Mezhova railway station is on the railway line connecting Dnipro via Synelnykove and Chaplyne with Pokvovsk. There is infrequent passenger traffic.

== Social sphere ==
- 2 general secondary schools;
- agricultural lyceum-boarding school (former school No. 3);
- children's and youth sports school;
- 3 preschool educational institutions;
- house of creativity of schoolchildren;
- hospital;
- house of culture;
- historical and local history museum.

There is a Plast movement, which has 15 people and is full members of the national scouting organization "Plast". There is an association of members of the "UKROP" party.

== Notable people ==
- Vladimir Semichastny (1924–2001), Soviet politician, KGB chairman 1961–1967
