= Panteleimon Belochub =

Ukrainian commander of Makhno Army (born 1892)

Panteleimon Fyodorovich Belochub
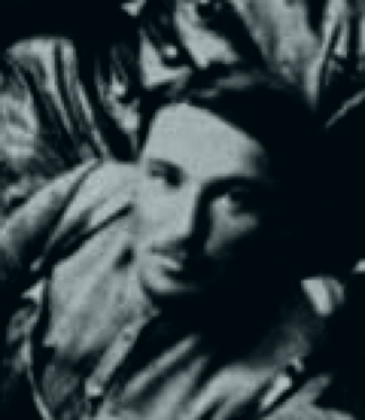
- Born: May 1892; Stary Krym; Mariupol County; Yekaterinoslav Governorate; Russian Empire
- Died: Not earlier than April 15, 1929; Kharkiv; Ukrainian Soviet Socialist Republic
- Spouse: Varvara Belochub (née Kior)
- Children: Ekaterina Belochub
- Military career
- Allegiance: Russian Empire (1914–1917); Makhnovshchina (1918–1921)
- Service years: 1914 – 1921
- Commands: 2nd Horse Artillery Battery, Ekaterinoslav Corps; Revolutionary Insurgent Army of Ukraine
- Conflicts: World War I Russian Civil War
- Awards: Cross of St. George, 4th and 3rd cl. Medal of St. George, 4th and 3rd cl.

Panteleimon "Panteley" Fyodorovich Belochub (Russian: Пантелеймон Фёдорович Белочуб, Ukrainian: Пантелеймон Федорович Білочуб, romanized: Panteleimon Fedorovych Bilochub), (May, 1892 – not earlier than April 15, 1929), was a Ukrainian soldier best known as one of the commanders of the Revolutionary Insurgent Army of Ukraine, a major belligerent force during the Russian Civil Wars of 1917 – 1921.

== Early life ==
Panteley Fyodorovich Belochub was born in May 1892 in a family of Azov Greeks in the village of Stary Krym, Mariupol County, Ekaterinoslav Province, Russian Empire. Panteley's father, Fyodor Belochub, died of tuberculosis when the child was only one and a half months old. The widowed mother remarried, leaving young Pamteley in the care of his paternal uncle, Themistocles Belochub. The boy grew up in a large and relatively affluent family, in the company of seven cousins, who treated him as a brother.

On May 1, 1913, Panteleimon married Varvara Kior. In the same year he was conscripted into the Russian Imperial Army. On August 1, 1914, Varvara gave birth to Pantaleimon's daughter, Ekaterina.

== World War I, Revolution, and Post-revolutionary Wars ==
Panteleimon Belochub fought with distinction in WWI. For valor under enemy fire, he was decorated with the Cross of St. George, 4th and 3rd class, and two medals of St. George. During this period, he gained experience in field and horse artillery, which became important in his later military career. For instance, in January 1915, Belochub earned an award by successfully aiming artillery fire at the advancing Austrian infantry and allowing the Russians to regroup while avoiding losses.

Shortly after the February Revolution of 1917, Panteleimon Belochub was transferred from the front to Tsarskoe Selo as a specialist in the formation of a new artillery battalion.

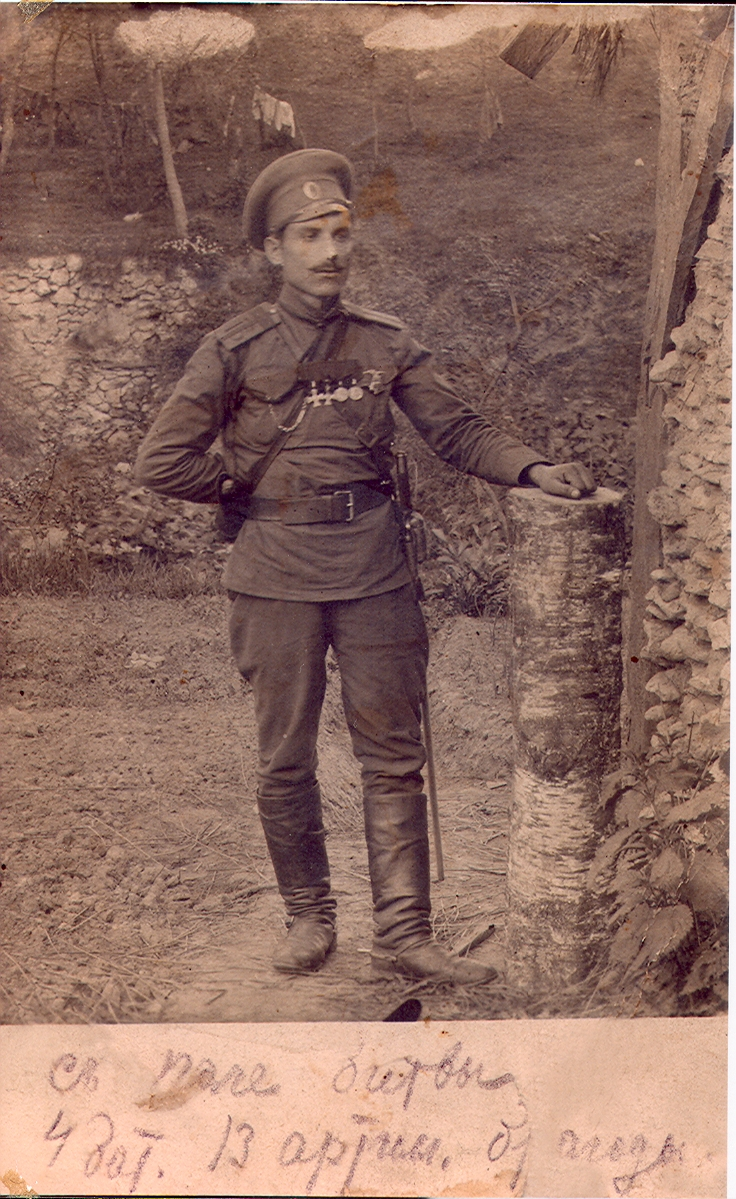
Panteleimon Belochub at the Russian Southwestern Front, WWI, June 1916

Viktor Belash, Chief of Staff of the Anarchist Revolutionary Insurgent Army of Ukraine (RIAU) under the command of Nestor Makhno, later claimed in his memoir that Belochub joined the RIAU in March 1919.

Quickly rising through the ranks, by the fall of 1919 Panteleimon Belochub commanded the 2nd Horse Artillery Battery, 3rd Ekaterynoslav Corps of the Revolutionary Insurgent Army of Ukraine (RIAU).

In October 1919, the RIAU found itself blocking the path of Denikin's White forces, which were retreating southward under the pressure of the Red Army. Seeing this development as an opportunity, Nestor Makhno attacked the Whites, but found his mainly-peasant detachments unable to match the well-organized units of the Armed Forces of South Russia (AFSR), which were still maintaining cohesion regardless of the recent defeats. Soon the RIAU was forced to abandon its "capital" in Huliaipole as well as all of the Dnieper's left bank, crossing the river over the Kichkas Bridge, near Alexandrovsk (present-day Zaporizhia), and blowing up the bridge behind them. White General Revishin decided not to pursue the RIAU across the river, focusing instead on a mopping-up operation against the remnants of the Makhnovist detachments on the left bank.

While the AFSR commanders were concentrating their forces on the left bank of the Dnieper, they maintained a relatively light presence on the right bank. Nestor Makhno took advantage of this situation and moved decisively on Ekaterinoslav, taking the city from the Whites on November 10, 1919. Belochub distinguished himself during the Ekaterinoslav offensive, in the battle against the units of the 2nd Terek Cossack Division, AFSR, near the village of Stepove on November 8, 1919, and was wounded in this engagement.

During the Ekaterynoslav operation, the Makhnovists coordinated their actions with Bolshevik detachments in and around the city. Upon taking Ekaterinoslav, the two political groups continued to cooperate, and the local organization of RCP(b) operated openly. Even within its own ranks, the RIAU counted a considerable number of communists. The most notable of them was Mikhail Polonsky, a regimental commander in RIAU. This process of rapprochement was interrupted by the arrest of Polonsky, who was accused of subversive activity in favor of the Red Army and of conspiracy to assassinate Nestor Makhno.

Panteleimon Belochub was arrested by the Makhnovist Counterintelligence along with Polonsky on December 2, 1919. Apparently, Polonsky tried to persuade Belochub to switch sides from the RIAU to the Reds, promising the support of Ivan Fedko, a senior commander in the Red 11th Army. According to Belochub's official interrogation record, he was released the same evening, after a lengthy "conversation" with Nestor Makhno. Polonsky and a group of his associates, however, were summarily executed. This incident led to a sharp deterioration of the RIAU relations with the Red Army and Bolsheviks.

In the Civil War, alliances shifted often. Yesterday's bitter rivals at times found themselves bonding together against a common enemy. On October 15, 1920, Nestor Makhno signed a Treaty of Political and Military Alliance with the Red Army – this time against Baron Wrangel's White Forces in Crimea. In November 1920 RIAU assisted the Reds in the Siege of Perekop. Belochub took part in this operation as an artillery commander. The Red Army, having barely secured the victory over the Whites, turned on their RIAU allies in a relentless pursuit across Southeastern Ukraine and Southern Russia. Regardless of the overwhelming numerical superiority of their pursuers, the Makhnovists kept fighting through the winter of 1920–1921. Belochub remained with RIAU until February 1921, when he and his artillery unit were forced to surrender.

== Post-war life ==
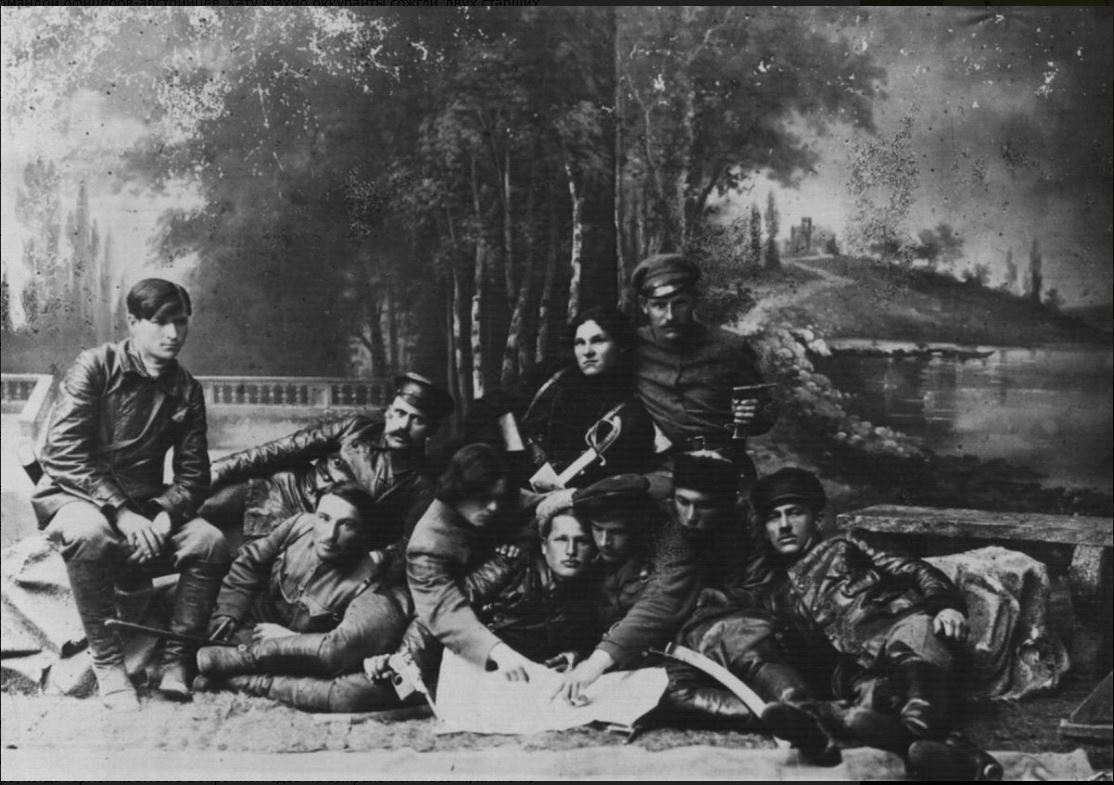
Panteleimon Belochub (second from the left) with Nestor Makhno and other RIAU commanders in Berdyansk, 1919

Cheka, the Soviet secret police, kept Panteleimon Belochub prisoner until releasing him under the General Amnesty of November 4, 1921. Upon regaining his freedom, Panteleimon returned to his native village of Stary Krym and soon was elected mayor, a position that he held until 1927.

While holding an elected office in the 1920s, Belochub maintained relationships with his wartime comrades, RIAU veterans. However, there is no evidence to suggest his involvement in the underground anarchist organizations. The wave of arrests that devastated these organizations in 1924 did not affect him. In a 1927 meeting with the former RIAU Chief of Staff, Viktor Belash, Belochub described himself as a "tired" anarchist.

== Rebellion attempt and death ==
In 1927 Panteleimon Belochub resigned from the local government, focusing entirely on running his own farm. It seemed as if his rebel past was behind him. However, much changed in 1928, when the Soviet authorities resumed systematic requisitions of grain and other foodstuffs from the peasants and farmers across the former Makhnovshchina and the whole of Ukraine. These systematic requisitions continued into the early 1930s and led to the widespread artificial famine, known in Ukraine as "Holodomor," literally "Death by Starvation." Holodomor claimed millions of lives in Ukraine with the death toll peaking in 1933.

According to the files of the Soviet secret police, OGPU (the successor to the Cheka), Panteleimon Belochub responded to the food requisitions by preparing armed resistance. Together with his former comrade-in-arms, Abram Budanov, he organized a small band of Makhnovist fighters and began stockpiling weapons and ammunition. At the same time, Budanov, having gained access to a printing press at a factory in Mariupol, published leaflets, calling upon the industrial workers, farmers, and peasants to rise up against the tyranny of the Soviets.

Belochub and Budanov were not alone in their resolve to resist the regime. Various anarchist leaders began similar preparations in other regions of Ukraine. For example, the former chairman of the RIAU Revolutionary Military Council, Ivan Chernoknizhny, was preparing an armed insurrection in Mezhova Raion, Dnipropetrovsk Okruha (now Synelnykove District, Dnipropetrovsk Region) of Ukraine.

In 1928, the Soviet secret police arrested the Belochub-Budanov group and detained Panteleimon Belochub in Mariupol for at least several days and then transferred him to Kharkiv for further investigation.

The Soviets conducted a show trial of the Bilochub-Budanov group in Kharkiv, then the Ukrainian capital. Both organizers of the uprising were sentenced to death on 15 April 1929. The remaining ten defendants were sent to labor camps for ten years.

== Political views ==
During Belochub's lifetime, anarchism was not a single ideological system in Ukraine. Instead, it was a rather eclectic collection of four competing schools of thought: anarcho-syndicalism, collectivist anarchism, anarcho-communism, and individualist anarchism. An attempt to create a common platform for the Nabat Confederation of Anarchist Organizations in Ukraine ultimately failed.

Belash's memoirs shed some light on Belochub's views. For instance, Belash claimed that Belochub strongly objected to any reconciliation with the communists. Belochub held no illusions about the risks of furthering the anarchist cause in the conditions of the Soviet state. He considered recruitment among the younger generations as irresponsible. In his view, the new recruits would just end up in prisons and forced labor camps before being able to make a difference. Belochub believed that the struggle had to be carried on by the old guard, who would bring in the new recruits only upon gaining some military success in the new war.

== Bibliography ==
- Belash, Aleksandr Víktorovich; Belash, Victor Fiódorovich (1993). Dorogi Nestora Makhno: istoricheskoe povestvovanie [Roads of Nestor Makhno: historical narrative] (in Russian). Kiev: RVT︠S︡ "Proza". ISBN 978-5-7707-3814-8. OCLC 31740208.
- Yarutsky, Lev Davidovich (1995). Махно и махновцы [Makhno and the Makhnovists] (in Russian). Mariupol.
- Yarutsky, Lev Davidovich (2002). Мариупольская мозаика : Рассказы краеведа [Mariupol mosaic: stories of a local historian] (in Russian). Moscow: Приазов. рабочий. ISBN 966-7052-93-1.
- Patrikeev, S. B. (2012). Сводные списки кавалеров Георгиевского креста 1914–1922 гг. Том 5. [Consolidated Lists of the Recipients of the St. George Cross, 1914–1922. Volume 5] (in Russian). Moscow: Духовная Нива. ISBN 978-5-87785-062-0.
