= Mezhova Raion =

Former subdivision of Dnipropetrovsk Oblast, Ukraine

Mezhova Raion Межівський район
- Raion
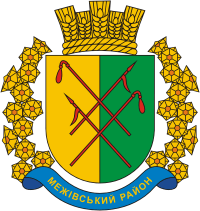
- Flag Coat of arms

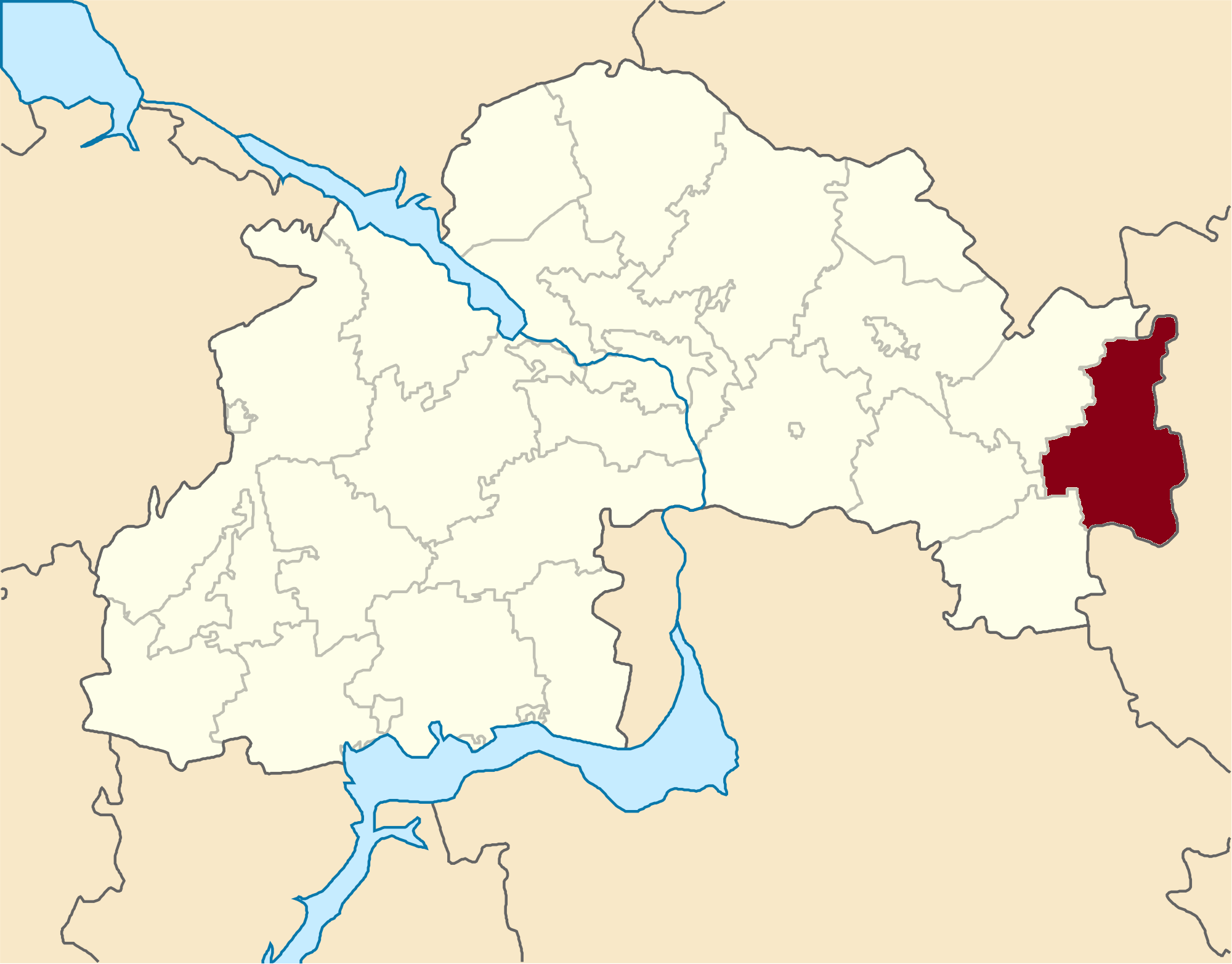
- Coordinates: 48°15′N 36°43′E
- Country: Ukraine
- Region: Dnipropetrovsk Oblast
- Disestablished: 18 July 2020
- Admin. center: Mezhova
- Subdivisions: List: — city councils; — settlement councils; — rural councils; Number of localities: — cities; — urban-type settlements; — villages; — rural settlements

Area
  - Total: 1,250 km^{2} (480 sq mi)

Population (2020)
  - Total: 22,579
  - Density: 18.1/km^{2} (46.8/sq mi)
- Time zone: UTC+02:00 (EET)
  - Summer (DST): UTC+03:00 (EEST)
- Area code: +380

Mezhova Raion (Ukrainian: Межівський район) was a raion (district) of Dnipropetrovsk Oblast, southeastern-central Ukraine. Its administrative centre was located at the urban-type settlement of Mezhova. The raion was abolished on 18 July 2020 as part of the administrative reform of Ukraine, which reduced the number of raions of Dnipropetrovsk Oblast to seven. The area of Mezhova Raion was merged into Synelnykove Raion. The last estimate of the raion population was 22,579 (2020 est.).

At the time of disestablishment, the raion consisted of three hromadas:

- Mezhova settlement hromada with the administration in Mezhova;
- Novopavlivka rural hromada with the administration in the selo of Novopavlivka;
- Slovianka rural hromada with the administration in the selo of Slovianka.

== Notable people ==
Ivan Chernoknizhny (1890-1928) – anarchist in the Revolutionary Insurgent Army of Ukraine (RIAU) under Nestor Makhno was native to the region.
