= Nina Niss-Goldman =

Russian artist (1892–1990)

Nina Ilyinichna Niss-Goldman
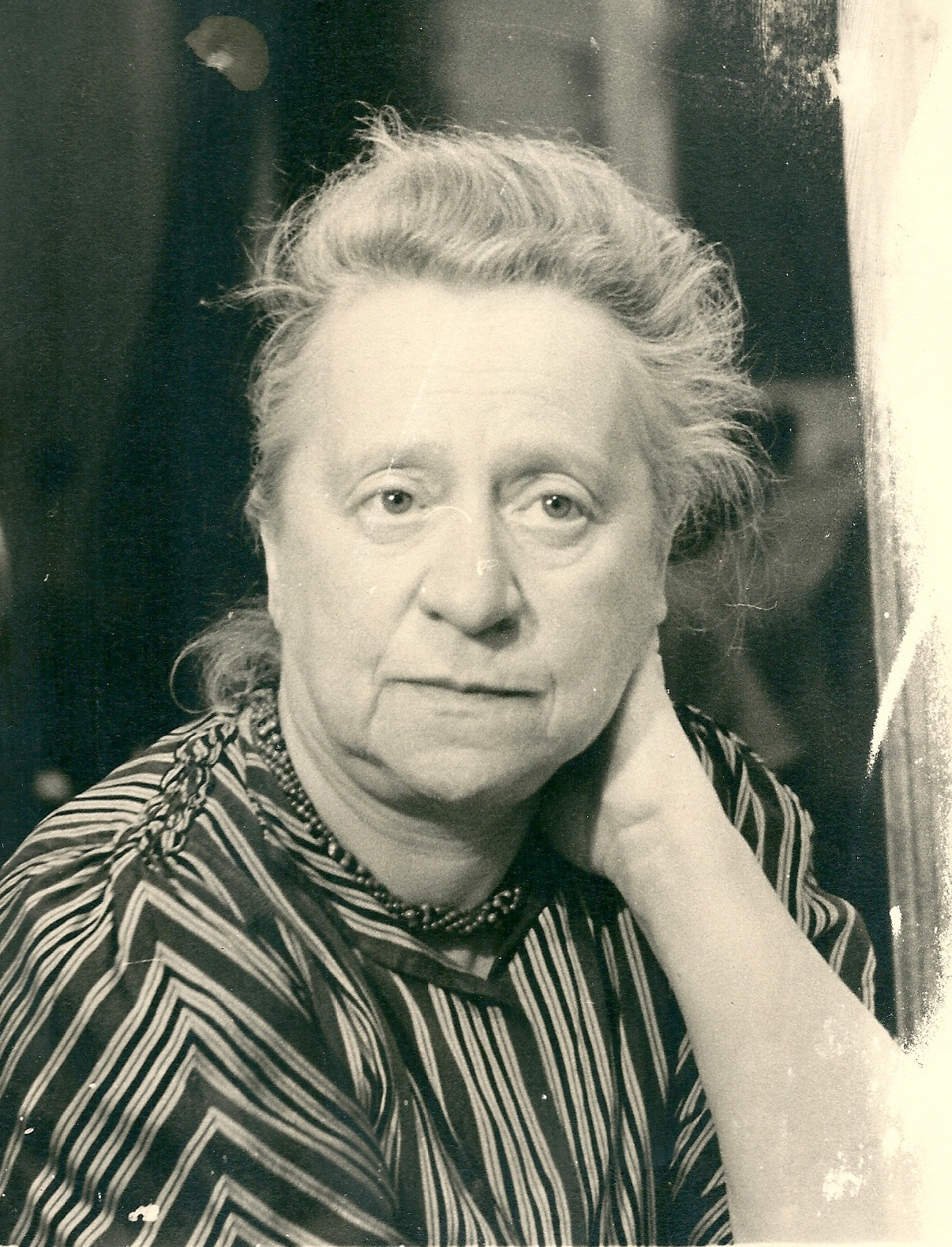
- Born: 19 September 1892; Rostov-on-Don, Russian Empire
- Died: 30 January 1990 (aged 97); Moscow, Russian SFSR, Soviet Union
- Education: Académie de La Palette
- Known for: Sculptor

Nina Ilyinichna Niss-Goldman (Russian: Ни́на Ильи́нична Нисс-Го́льдман, 19 September 1892 – 30 January 1990, Moscow) was a painter, sculptor and a teacher of Jewish origin that was one of the founding members of the Society of Artists 'The Four Arts' (1924–1931, Moscow). Nina was a member of the Society of Russian Sculptors (SRS) (1925–1932, Moscow), a member of the Moscow Union of Artists (MOSSH) since its foundation (1932) and was the most senior member of the Artists' Union of the USSR. Her brother was Russian-American writer, journalist and film producer Voldemar Ryndzune Vetluguin.

== Biography ==
Nina Ilyinichna Niss-Goldman was born on 19 September 1892 in Rostov-on-Don to a Jewish family of the doctor Ilya Gilelevich Ryndzyun.

At the age of 14 she began her studies at the sculpture school in Kyiv, but in 1909 at the age of 16, she left for Paris and entered into the famous 'Académie Rousse'. There she met Alexander Archipenko, Oscar Meshchaninov, Amedeo Modigliani, Chana Orloff, Chaïm Soutine, Ossip Zadkine, Joseph Chaikov and others. With Amedeo Modigliani they would often meet to eat onion soup together in a nearby café. She was also heavily influenced by Auguste Rodin and Aristide Maillol.

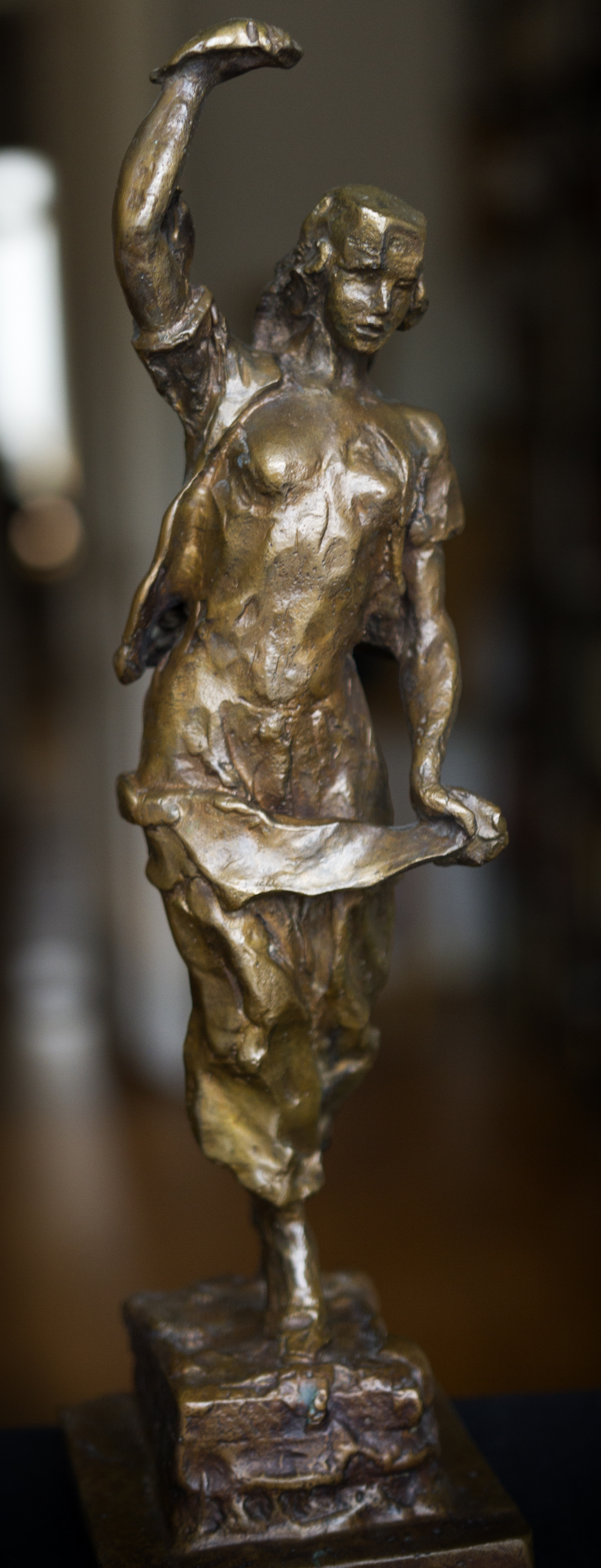
Nina Niss-Goldman, Uzbek Dancer, bronze, 1932

From 1920 Nina Niss-Goldman taught at VKhUTEMAS (later in 1926 re-organised into VKhUTEIN), where she received the title of professor. On the recommendation of Vladimir Favorsky in 1926, she left for a two-year scholarship trip to Italy, where she attended courses at the Roman Academy of Fine Arts.

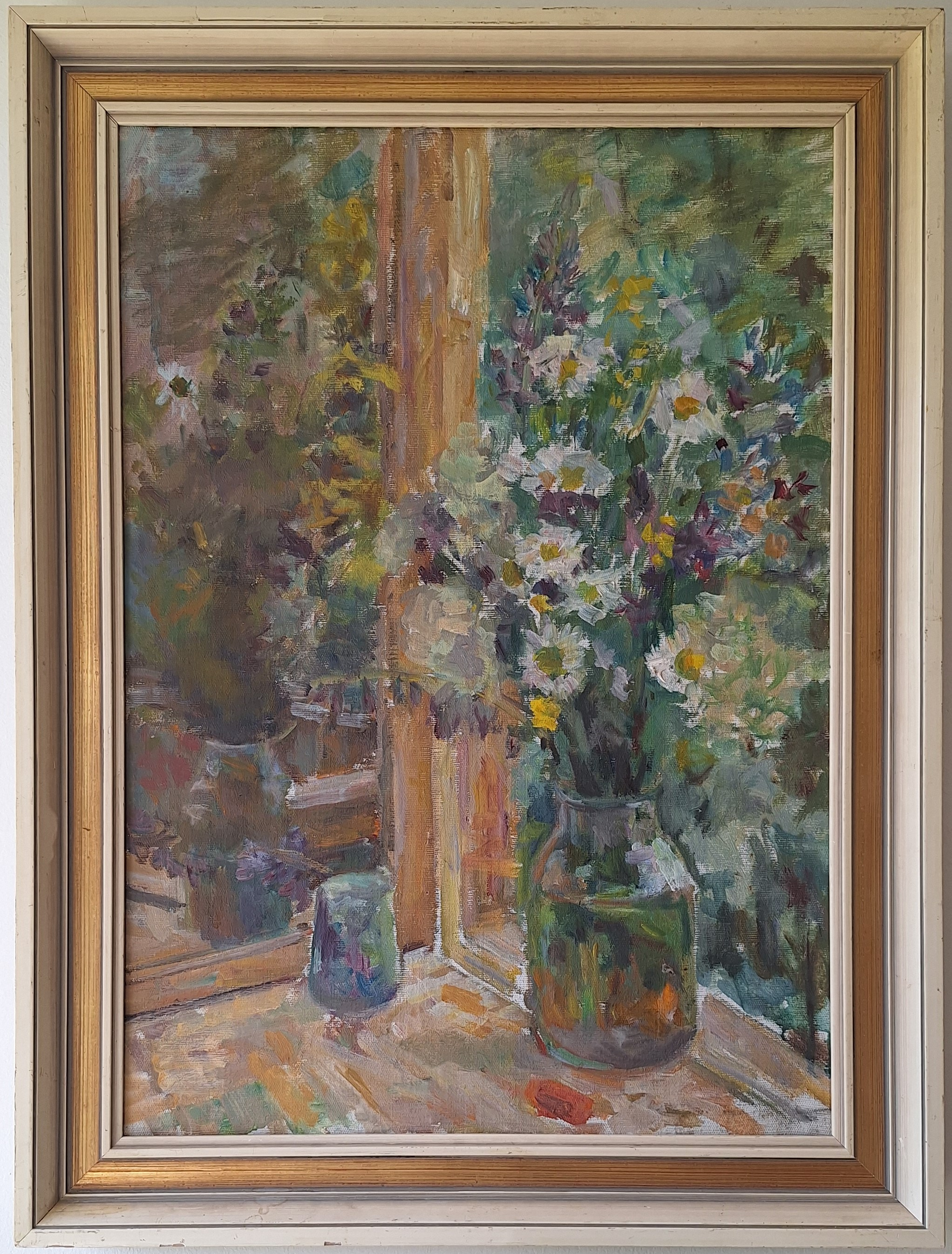
Nina Niss-Goldman, Still life with flowers. Canvas, oil, 48x67 cm. Impressionism painting

From 1915 she began to participate in exhibitions in Moscow, the Union and abroad.

Her works can be found in numerous museums in Russia, including the collection of the Russian avant-garde of the 1920s in the Saint Petersburg Russian Museum and the Tretyakov Gallery in Moscow. A bust of the poet Valery Bryusov (1924) who posed for her shortly before his death, is still commonly exhibited at exhibitions dedicated to 20th-century Russian art.

In addition to sculpture, Nina Niss-Goldman devoted herself passionately to painting. Critics greatly appreciate her still lives in oil on canvas, many of which can still be found in private collections in Russia, Italy and Germany. In 2020, the Tretyakov Gallery accepted a self-portrait of Nina Niss-Goldman (canvas, oil, 70x64 cm) as a gift from the Sovart Gallery.

Nina Niss-Goldman died in Moscow and is buried in the Preobrazhenskoye Cemetery.

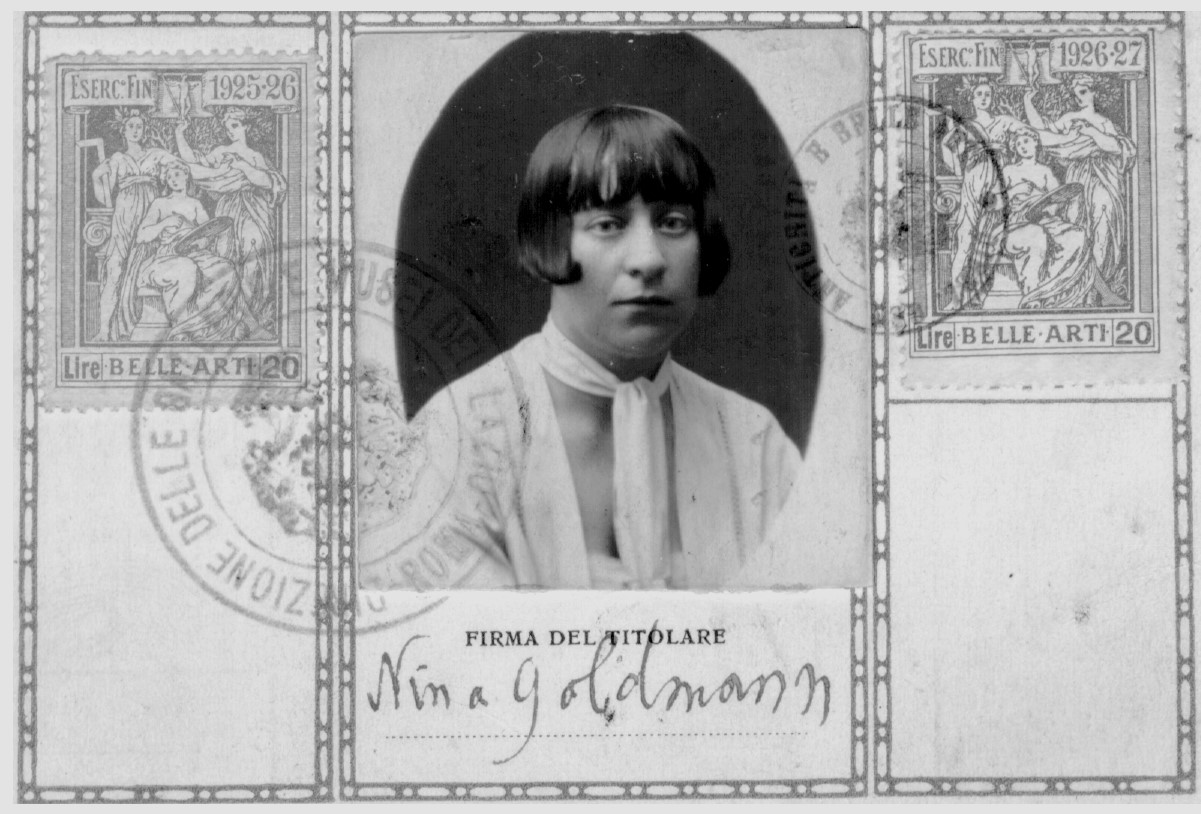
Nina Niss-Goldman, Accademia di belle arti di Roma, Identity Card. 1926

== Selected works ==
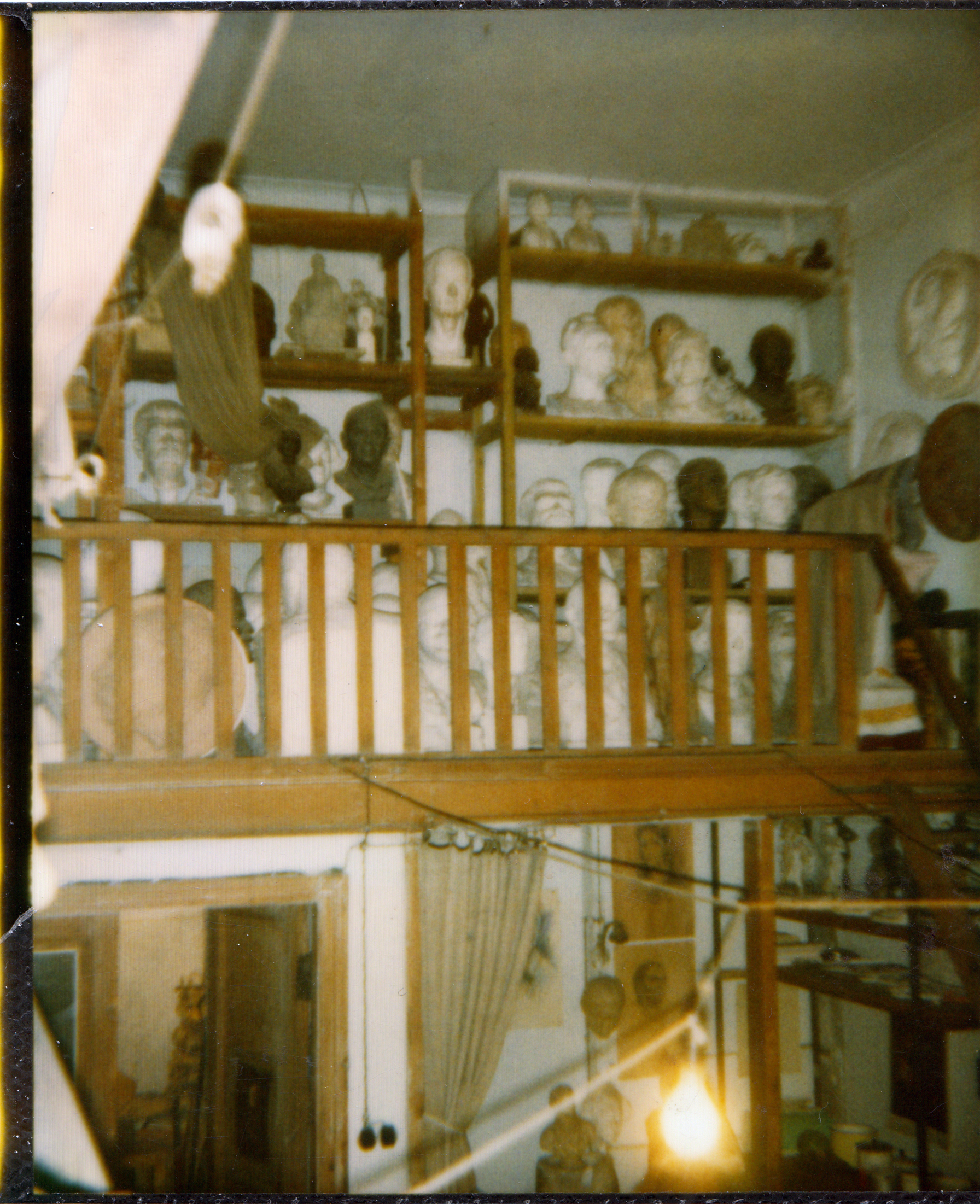
In Nina Niss-Goldman´s studio, Moscow, Verkhnyaya Maslovka Street. 1985

Niss-Goldman took many portraits of her contemporaries. In particular, she was posed by

- Alexander Beloborodov
- Valery Bryusov
- Dusya Vinogradova
- Giovanni Germanetto
- Konstantin Paustovsky
- Alexander Solzhenitsyn

The museums also contain portraits of

- Yakov Sverdlov
- Vyacheslav Molotov
- Nikolai Gastello
- Antoine de Saint-Exupéry
- Andrei Platonov

About a dozen sculptures and commemorative plaques have been installed in Moscow: to Leo Tolstoy, Sergei Rachmaninoff, Sergey Botkin, Alexander Ostuzhev, Nikolai Teleshov.

== Quotes ==
Alexandra Shatskikh:

...sculptor Nina Niss-Goldman, who lived in Paris in 1910–1915 and frequented Elie Nadelman and Chana Orloff, was close to Alexander Archipenko and Jacques Lipchitz in her plastic experiments. Her statues and sculptures... were characterised by a plastic power that gave no reason to discriminate them as 'feminine' works.

== From the memoirs of contemporaries ==
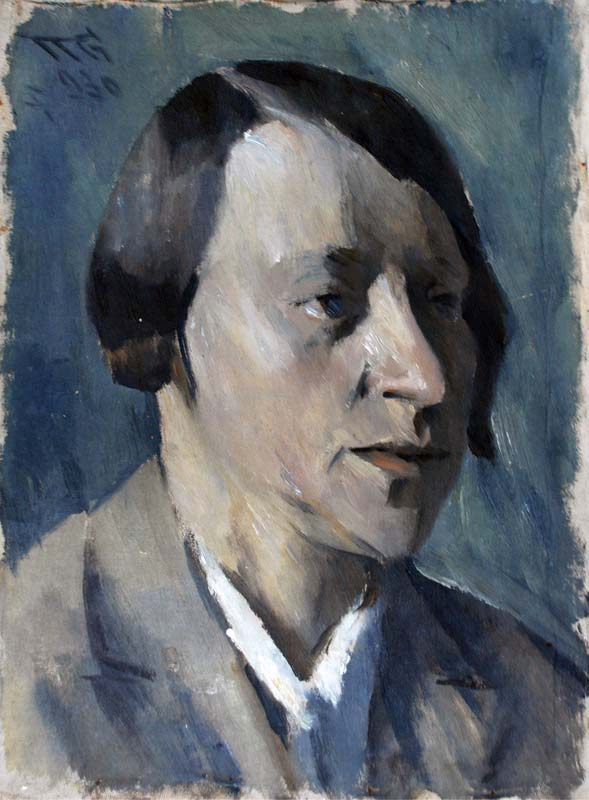
Vladimir Grinberg. Portrait of the sculptor Nina Niss-Goldman. Oil painting on canvas, 1930. Art Museum of Rostov-on-Don.

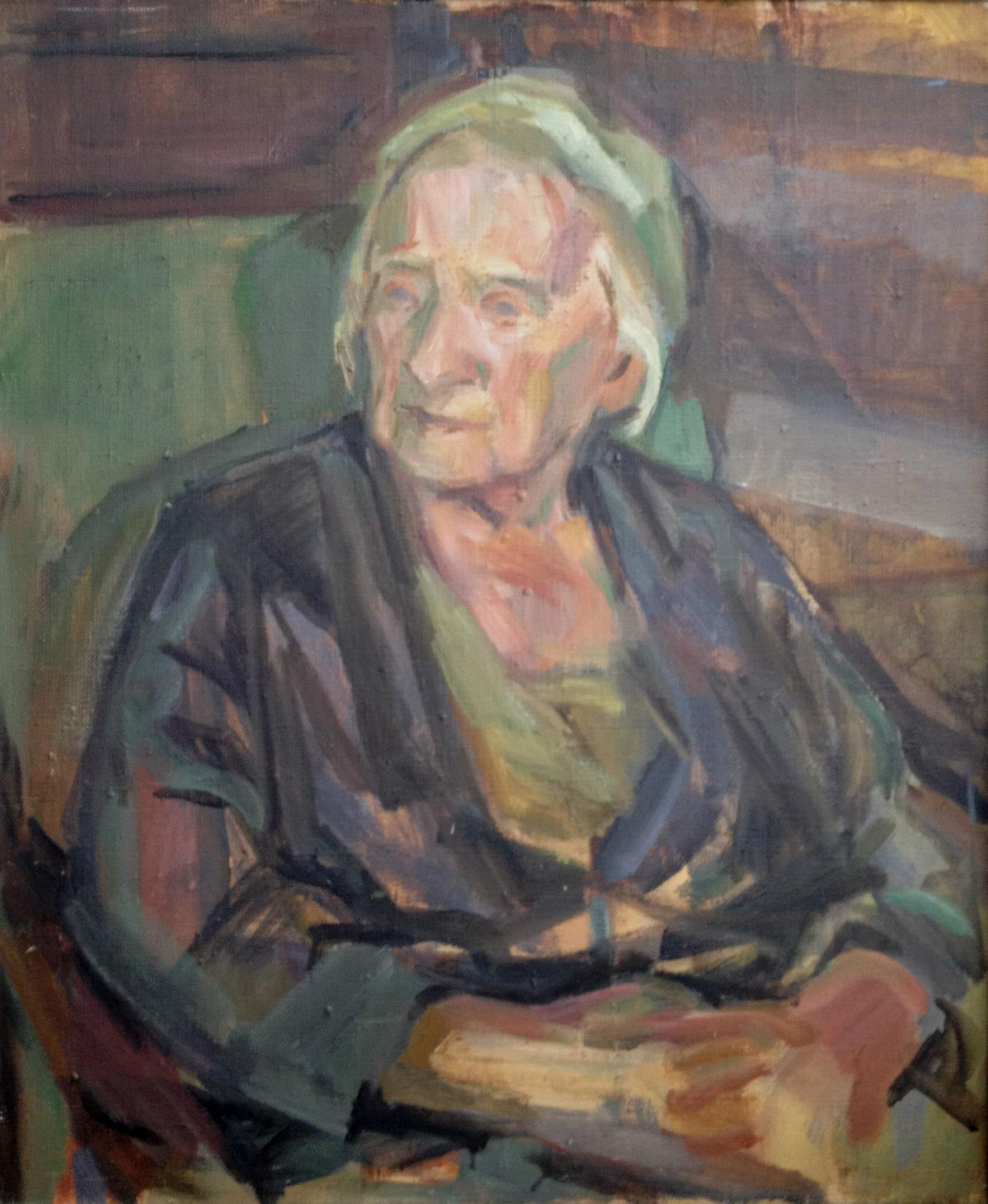
Alexander Ibragimov. Portrait of the sculptor Nina Niss-Goldman. Oil painting on canvas, 55х46 cm. 1988. Private collection.

A.Burganov:

... What attracts me about her is that she is probably the only living bridge between us and the great artists of the past. When one bends down to greet Nina Ilyinichna, one almost clashes with the great Modigliani, who at that same moment was bending down to kiss his girlfriend. It is hard to believe that Modigliani, Bourdelle, Maillol, Blok, Briusov were living people. For all of us, they are paintings, sculptures, books. Nina Ilyinichna simply and naturally conveys to us the warmth of the handshake of her great contemporaries in our present. This touch is a miracle. It gives us a living sense of history. We begin to believe in ourselves'.

T. Khvostenko:

... Nina Ilyinichna Niss-Goldman, who died in 1990 at the age of 98, captured the imagination of the young people around her constantly with stories about the extraordinary details of her sculptural career.

She studied in 1908 in Paris at the famous RUSS Academy among the Russian bohemian intelligentsia, knew Bourdelle and Bonnard personally, was friends with Modigliani, as well as the later famous Sadkin, Archipenko and others. She adored Russian poetry and was an interlocutor with Klyuev, Khlebnikov, Balmont, Yesenin, Tsvetaeva, of course, Akhmatova, as well as Blok's friend Nadezhda Pavlovich, and was able to personally listen to Blok, Vyacheslav Ivanov, Mayakovsky, Mandelstam.

She created countless portraits of several of her contemporaries and is proud that Moscow is decorated with about a dozen of her memorial sculptures and memorial plaques: Leo Tolstoy, Rachmaninoff, Botkin, Ostuzhev, Teleshov and others.

Nadezhda Udaltsova:

...1950, 1st January. Two o'clock in the afternoon. I came from N [Nina Niss-Goldman], where I had celebrated the New Year. And what I felt when I wanted to write to Shegal appeared, asserted itself. Be what it will, but I am an artist again by the grace of God. Everything of mine has come together and went forward. All I need is a canvas. A family, I'm surrounded by the people I'm going to paint. I broke free from the stuffy hospital walls of my room and returned to my studio. There were mistakes, and one thing that I had weakened my spirit, that my ill will had fallen asleep. Well to work. I realised once again what I had known for a long time, that N E had come into my life as an artist in this way. Her optimism in art, her assertion of creative will, to me such support, more – it is part of some inner strength that in these years so weakened in me.

А. Poverin:

... I heard this story from Nina Ilyinichna Niss-Goldman, an outstanding Soviet sculptor, which is probably why it seemed to me to be carved in stone. Nina Ilyinichna's workshop was located in Verkhnyaya Maslovka. At that time, many famous Soviet sculptors lived and worked there. In general, the people I was lucky enough to communicate with at that time were fantastic. Nina Ilyinichna alone was worth something. She studied in Paris. She spoke to Bourdelle, Despio and Picasso. She was friends with Modigliani and Zadkine. In Russia, she taught for over forty years at the VKHUTEMAS and VKHUTEIN. Many outstanding Soviet sculptors passed through her hands. She sculpted Klyuev, Bryusov and Platonov from life. She was friends with Majakovsky, Mukhina and Bruni, etc., etc.

Valentina Morderer:

...A completely different kind of Bohemian intelligence was demonstrated by the sculptress Nina Ilyinichna Niss-Goldman, who often came to this house in the evenings. It was difficult for her to walk due to age and illness, but she lived very close to Myasnitskaya and was all too eager for new books and impressions.

Niss laconic, philosophical and mischievous, fortunately, could not even imagine what posthumous glory awaited her. First, Dina Rubina made her the heroine of her story 'On Verkhnyaya Maslovka', and then she became a celebrity after the release of the film of the same name in 2005, starring Alisa Freindlich and Evgeny Mironov.

So earthly glory not only passes, but sometimes falls from nowhere. Nina Ilyinichna was full of self-confidence, knew her worth and in no way pursued cheap or expensive popularity. But she received it in full.

== Exhibitions ==
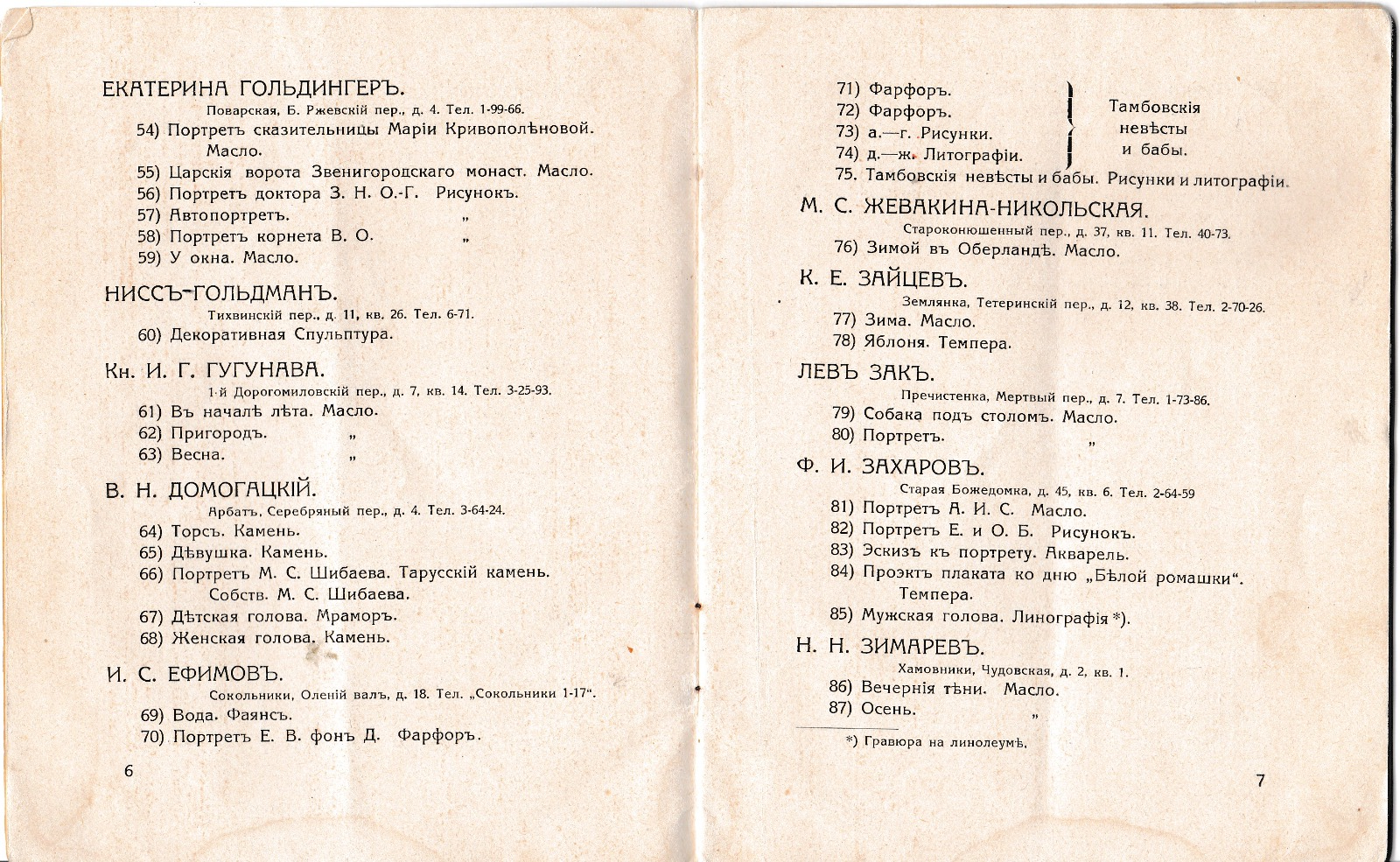
The Moscow Association of Artists, 22nd Exhibition Catalogue (Moscow, 1916) – Pages 6 and 7.

The total number of exhibitions in which Niss-Goldman took part include:

- 1916 Moscow: 22nd EXHIBITION OF THE MOSCOW ARTISTS ASSOCIATION
- 1924 Moscow: 26th EXHIBITION OF THE MOSCOW ARTISTS ASSOCIATION
- 1925 Moscow: "THE 4 ARTS" ARTISTS EXHIBITION
- 1926 Moscow: EXHIBITION OF PAINTING, GRAPHICS, SCULPTURE, ARCHITECTURE OF "THE 4 ARTS" SOCIETY OF ARTISTS
- 1927 Moscow: 2nd SCULPTURE EXHIBITION OF THE SOCIETY OF RUSSIAN SCULPTORS (ORS)
- 1929 Moscow: 3rd SCULPTURE EXHIBITION OF THE SOCIETY OF RUSSIAN SCULPTORS (ORS)
- 1933 Moscow: EXHIBITION "ARTISTS OF THE RSFSR FOR XV YEARS (1917–1932)". Sculpture
- 1934 Moscow: EXHIBITION OF WORKS OF ARTISTS COMMANDED BY THE Council of People's Commissars of the RSFSR, NARKOMPROS, "ALL-ARTIST" AND MOSSKH THROUGHOUT THE USSR IN 1933
- 1937 Exhibitions abroad: INTERNATIONAL EXHIBITION "ART AND TECHNOLOGY IN MODERN LIFE"
- 1937 Moscow: MOSCOW SCULPTORS' EXHIBITION
- 1939 Moscow: UNION EXHIBITION OF YOUNG ARTISTS DEDICATED TO THE TWENTIETH ANNIVERSARY OF THE Komsomol
- 1940 Byelorussian SSR: SOVIET FINE ARTS. TRAVELING EXHIBITION IN THE WESTERN REGIONS OF THE BSSR
- 1940 Moscow: SCULPTURE EXHIBITION OF THE MOSCOW UNION OF SOVIET ARTISTS
- 1945 Auth. Rep., territories and regions of the RSFSR: EXHIBITION OF ARTISTIC WORKS FOR THE CONFERENCE OF THE ACADEMY OF SCIENCES OF THE USSR ON THE STUDY OF THE PRODUCTIVE FORCES OF THE MOLOTOV REGION
- 1946 Moscow: ALL UNION ART EXHIBITION
- 1955 Moscow: 50 YEARS OF THE FIRST RUSSIAN REVOLUTION
- 1955 Moscow: EXHIBITION OF PAINTINGS, SCULPTURE, GRAPHICS AND WORKS OF THEATER AND CINEMA ARTISTS OF MOSCOW AND LENINGRAD
- 1957 Moscow: ALL-UNION ART EXHIBITION DEDICATED TO THE 40TH ANNIVERSARY OF THE GREAT OCTOBER SOCIALIST REVOLUTION
- 1957 Moscow: EXHIBITION OF PAINTING, SCULPTURE, GRAPHICS FOR THE FIRST ALL-UNION CONGRESS OF SOVIET ARTISTS
- 1958 Moscow: ALL-UNION ART EXHIBITION "40 YEARS OF THE Komsomol"

== Family ==
Father – Ilya Gilelevich Ryndzyun, a graduate of the Imperial Military Medical Academy in Sankt-Peterburg and a well known doctor in Russia at the end of the 19th century that specialised in water therapy. He founded one of the first hydropathic clinics in Russia in Rostov-on-Don. Author of the textbook Basics of Hydrotherapy and Light Therapy.

Mother – Matilda Borisovna Ryndzyun, née Raivich.

Husband – Alexander Goldman, mathematician.

Brother – Voldemar Ryndzune Vetluguin (1897–1953) – writer, publicist, journalist; author of the works Adventurers of the Civil War, The Third Russia, secretary and translator of Isadora Duncan and Sergei Yesenin. In exile after the Russian Revolution.

Daughter – Niss Aleksandrovna Pekareva (née Goldman) (1913–1984), architect, author of numerous articles and monographs on the history and theory of architecture, including "I. A. Fomin" (1953), "New Kakhovka" (1958), "Moscow Metro" (1958), "Elektrostal" (1962), "State Kremlin Palace" (photo album, 1965–1978, numerous reprints), "M. V. Posokhin: Popular Architect of the USSR" (1985), etc. Member of the Union of Architects of the USSR.

Son-in-law – Alexander Vasilyevich Pekarev (1905–1978) – architect, sculptor. Member of the USSR Union of Architects. Member of the Union of Artists of the USSR. Chief sculptor of VDNKh.

Grandson – Denis Pekarev (1938), graduate of Saint Petersburg State University of Architecture and Civil Engineering (SPbGASU). After graduation, he worked in the Arctic as a foreman at the construction of the Severonikel metallurgical plant (Monchegorsk). In 1973 he left the USSR. Since 1973 he has lived in Rome. He worked in the Vatican on Vatican Radio (1974–1977), the BBC World Service in London (1978–1981), Radio Liberty in Munich (1985–1995). He participated in film production, working with Warren Beatty, Pasquale Squitieri, Michelangelo Antonioni, Andrei Tarkovsky, Federico Fellini.

Niece – Galina Davydovna Tyagai (1922–2006) – orientalist, specialist in the history of Korea and the problems of the national liberation movement in Asian countries. Doctor of Historical Sciences.

== Mentions ==
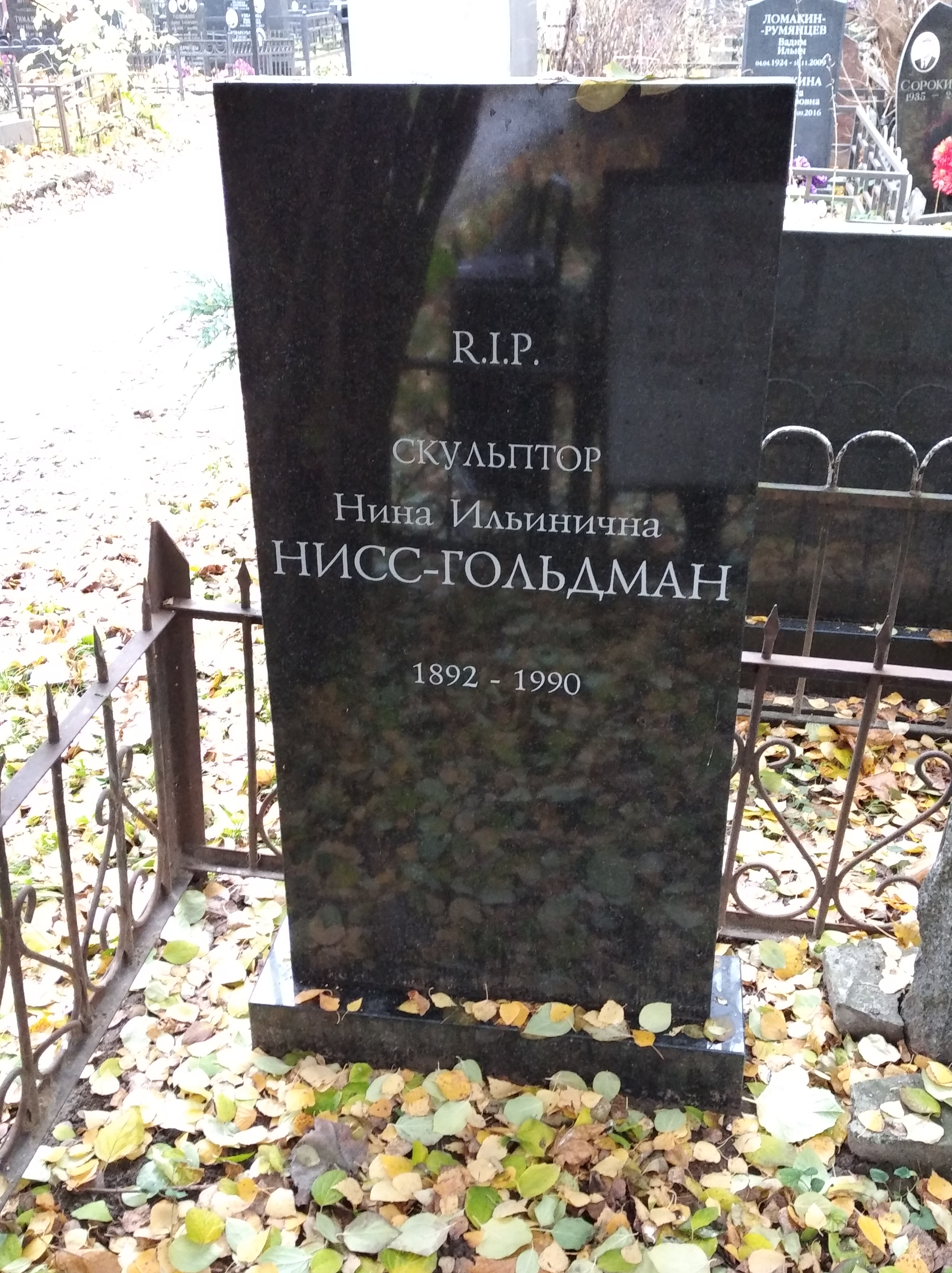
- Nina Niss-Goldman grave
  House on Maslovka is a documentary film directed by Sergei Loginov (1990).
- On Verkhnyaya Maslovka is a story by Dina Rubina. – ISBN 978-5-04-118844-3 – The story is set in Moscow in the City of Artists. The prototype of the "old woman" was Nina Ilyinichna Niss-Goldman, who occupied studio 11 in building 1.
- On Upper Maslovka Street is a 2005 film based on the story of the same name by Dina Rubina, starring Alisa Freindlikh and Evgeny Mironov. Filmed directly inside the City of Artists.
- The Four Arts is an artistic association that existed in Moscow and Leningrad in 1924–1931.
- City of Artists is an architectural complex on the street. Verkhnyaya Maslovka in Moscow.
- The List of Artists of the Silver Age includes painters, graphic artists and sculptors who worked in Russia in the years 1900–1930 and who were members of various artistic groups and associations.
- Sculptor Gawriil Schulz – portrait of N. Niss-Goldman. Plaster, 1969.
- Painter Boris Karafelov – Portrait of Nina Niss-Goldman. Oil on Canvas, 26x38cm, 1980.
- Sculptor Lev Matyushin- portrait of N. Niss-Goldman.Bronze, 2005.
- "Evenings on Maslovka near Dinamo." — ISBN 978-5-94299-021-3 – two-volume book with the memoirs of the artist and restorer Tatyana Vasilievna Khvostenko, Olympia Press, Moscow 2003.
- N. I. Niss-Goldman on the website "Maslovka. City of Artists".
- 10,000 best artists in the world (18th–21st centuries).
- "Jewish women in the Russian avant-garde".
- "Jews in the Russian Avant-Garde: A National Art?"
