= 1930 in fine arts of the Soviet Union =

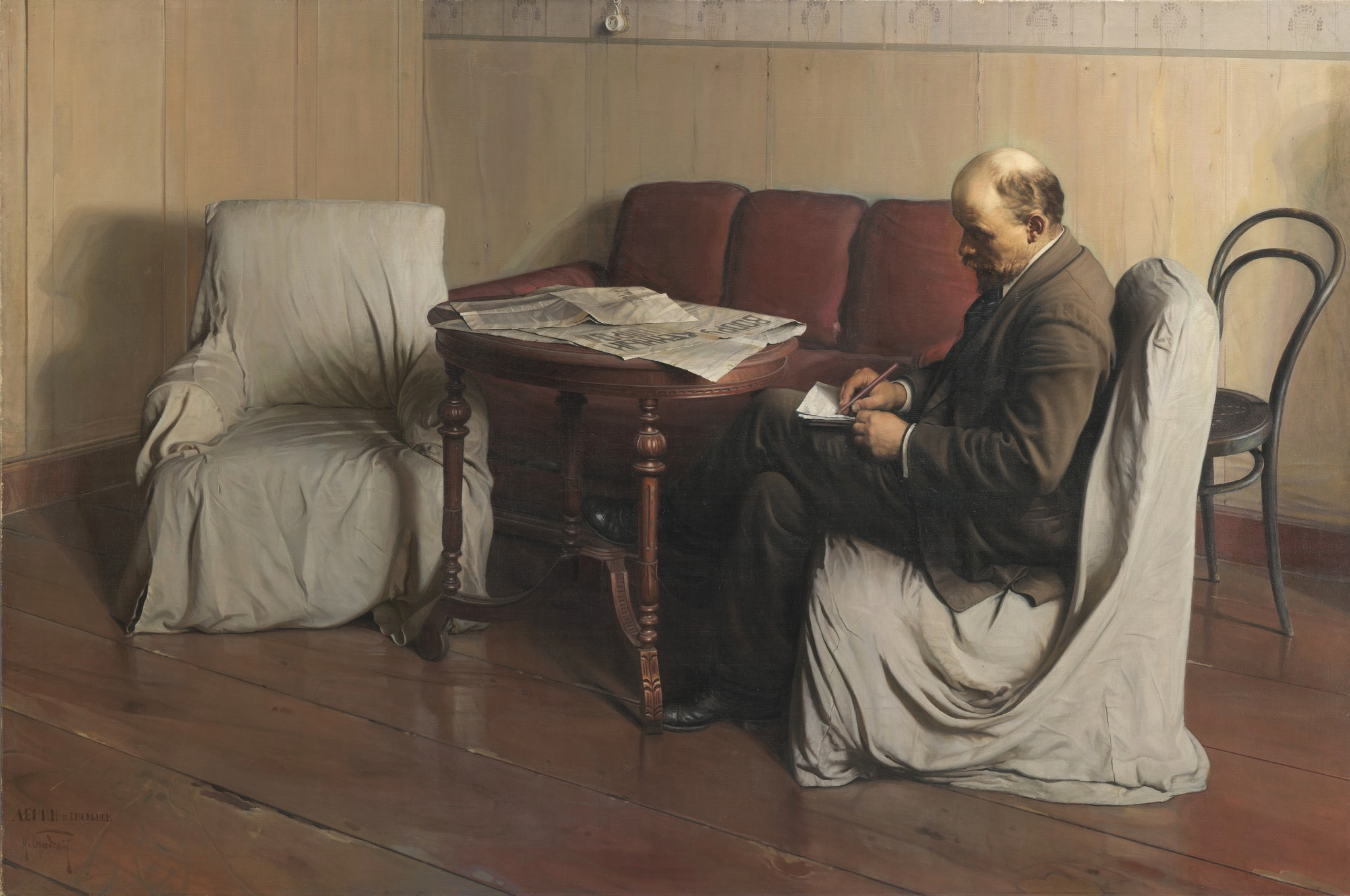
Isaak Brodsky. Lenin in Smolny

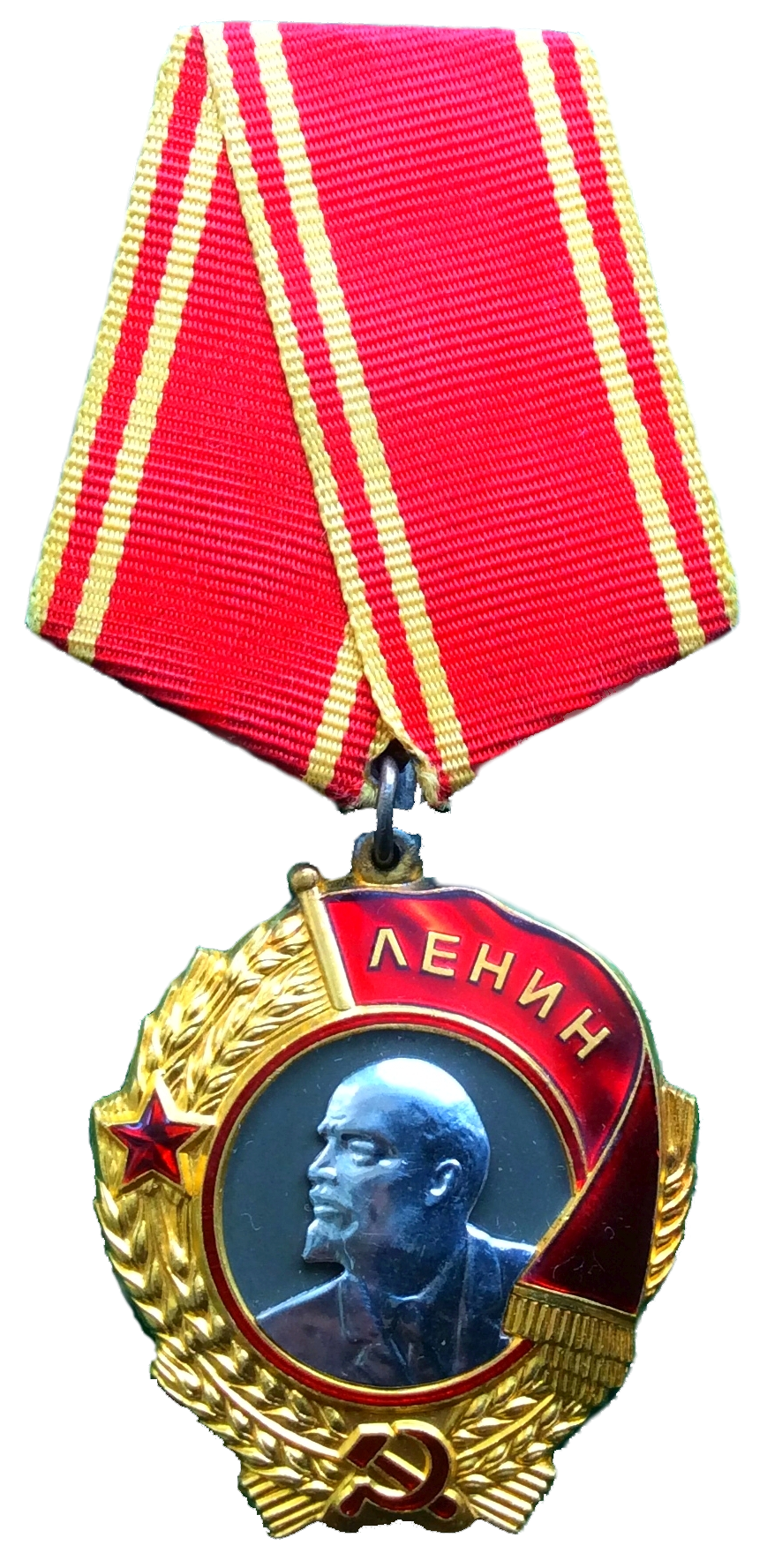
Order of Lenin

The year 1930 was marked by many events that left an imprint on the history of Soviet and Russian Fine Arts.

== Events ==
- April 6 — The Order of Lenin (Russian: Орден Ленина, Orden Lenina), named after the leader of the Russian October Revolution, was established by the Central Executive Committee as a highest decoration bestowed by the Soviet Union. The model of Order of Lenin was executed by sculptors of Ivan Shadr and Pyotr Tayozhny on the sketch of artist Ivan Dubasov.
- Isaak Brodsky creates a picture of «Lenin at Smolny in 1917» (Tretyakov gallery), which immediately after its introduction has become one of the most popular works on the image of the revolutionary leader and founder of the Soviet state.
- Closure of the Vkhutemas state art and technical school in Moscow.

== Births ==
- July 13 — Andrei Khaustov (Russian: Хаустов Андрей Иванович), Russian Soviet painter and sculptor (died 1978).
- September 28 — Nikolai Pozdneev (Russian: Николай Матвеевич Позднеев), Russian Soviet painter (died 1978).

== Deaths ==
- April 17 — Aleksandr Golovin (Russian: Александр Яковлевич Головин), Russian artist and stage designer (born 1863).
- September 25 — Abram Arkhipov (Russian: Архипов Абрам Ефимович), Russian Soviet painter and art teacher, People's Artist of the USSR (born 1862).
- September 29 — Ilya Repin (Russian: Илья Ефимович Репин), Russian painter and art teacher (born 1844).
- December 17 — Nikolay Kasatkin (Russian: Касаткин Николай Алексеевич), Russian Soviet painter, People's Artist of the RSFSR (born 1859).
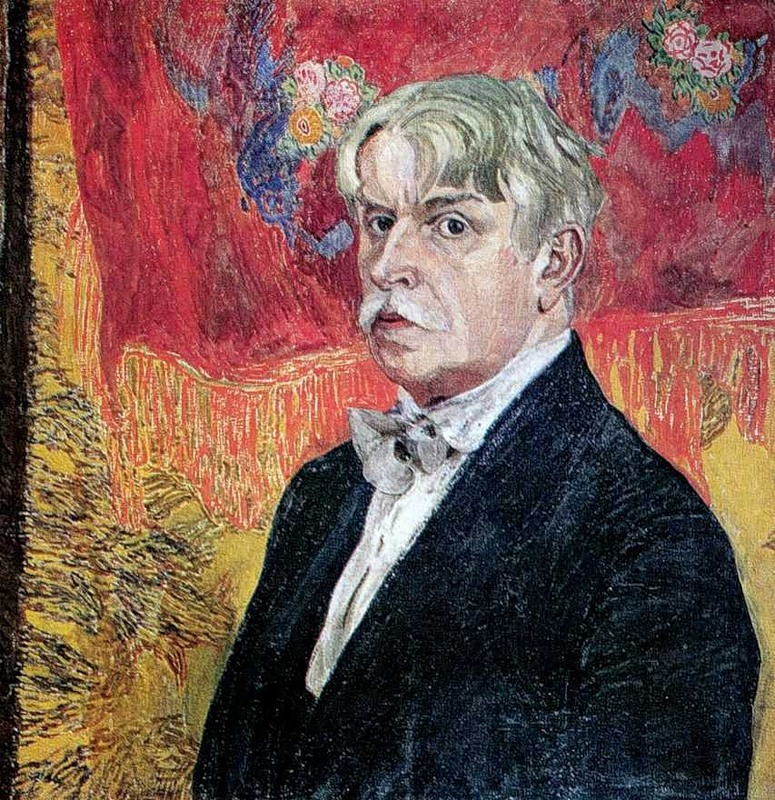
Aleksandr Golovin

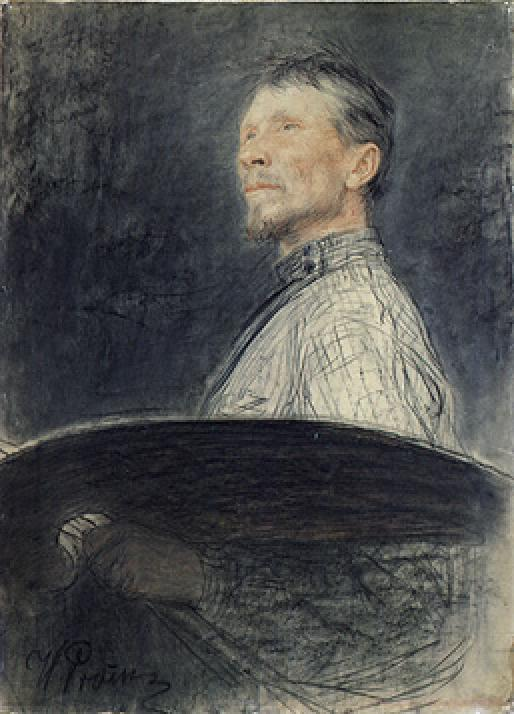
Abram Arkhipov

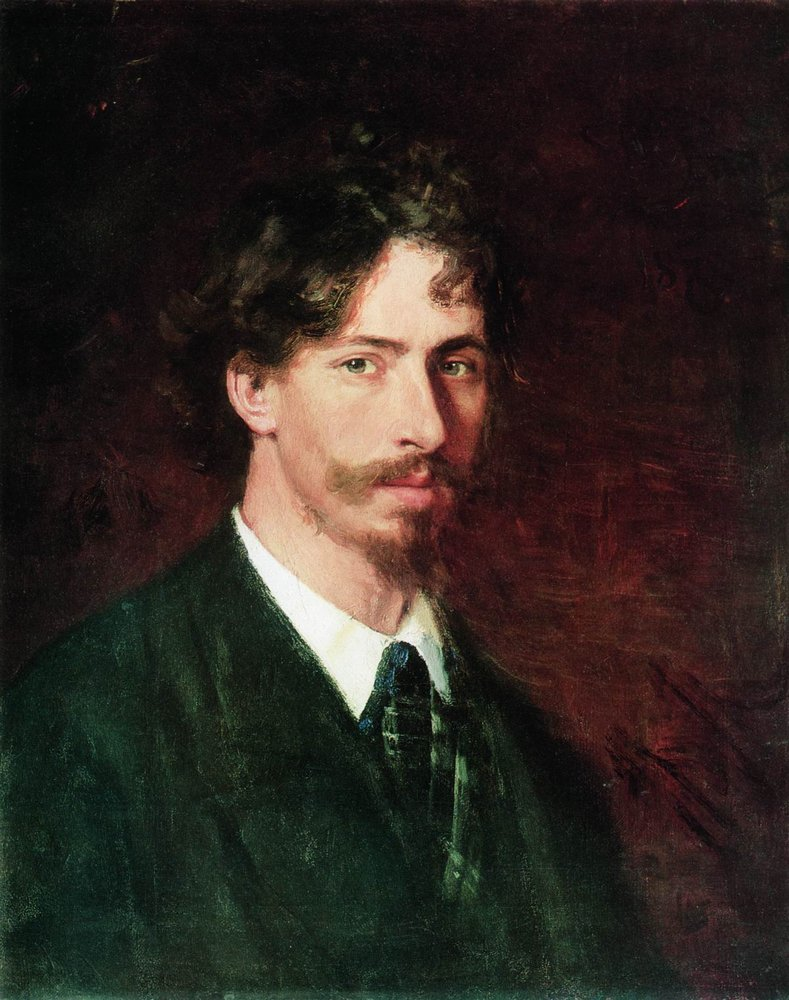
Ilya Repin

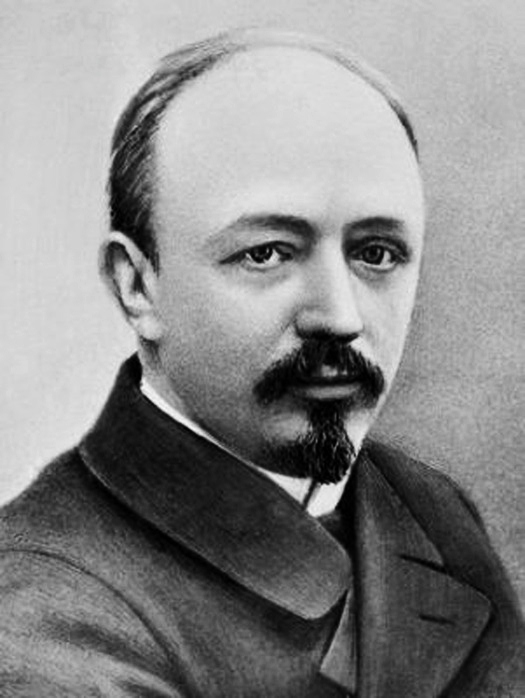
Nikolay Kasatkin

== See also ==
- List of Russian artists
- List of painters of Leningrad Union of Artists
- Saint Petersburg Union of Artists
- Russian culture
- 1930 in the Soviet Union

== Sources ==
- Каталог первой общегородской выставки изобразительных искусств. Живопись. Рисунок. Графика. Скульптура. Архитектура. Фарфор. Театральное оформление. Л., Рабис, 1930.
- Каталог выставки картин Общества имени А. И. Куинджи в залах Вхутеин. Л., 1930.
- Каталог приобретений Государственной комиссии по приобретениям произведений изобразительных искусств за 1928—1929 гг. М., Совет по делам искусства и литературы, 1930.
- Каталог выставки «Социалистическое строительство в советском искусстве». М., Всекохудожник, 1930.
- Artists of Peoples of the USSR. Biography Dictionary. Vol. 1. Moscow, Iskusstvo, 1970.
- Artists of Peoples of the USSR. Biography Dictionary. Vol. 2. Moscow, Iskusstvo, 1972.
- Directory of Members of Union of Artists of USSR. Volume 1,2. Moscow, Soviet Artist Edition, 1979.
- Directory of Members of the Leningrad branch of the Union of Artists of Russian Federation. Leningrad, Khudozhnik RSFSR, 1980.
- Artists of Peoples of the USSR. Biography Dictionary. Vol. 4 Book 1. Moscow, Iskusstvo, 1983.
- Directory of Members of the Leningrad branch of the Union of Artists of Russian Federation. - Leningrad: Khudozhnik RSFSR, 1987.
- Персональные и групповые выставки советских художников. 1917-1947 гг. М., Советский художник, 1989.
- Artists of peoples of the USSR. Biography Dictionary. Vol. 4 Book 2. - Saint Petersburg: Academic project humanitarian agency, 1995.
- Link of Times: 1932 - 1997. Artists - Members of Saint Petersburg Union of Artists of Russia. Exhibition catalogue. - Saint Petersburg: Manezh Central Exhibition Hall, 1997.
- Matthew C. Bown. Dictionary of 20th Century Russian and Soviet Painters 1900-1980s. - London: Izomar, 1998.
- Vern G. Swanson. Soviet Impressionism. - Woodbridge, England: Antique Collectors' Club, 2001.
- Sergei V. Ivanov. Unknown Socialist Realism. The Leningrad School. - Saint-Petersburg: NP-Print Edition, 2007. - ISBN 5-901724-21-6, ISBN 978-5-901724-21-7.
- Anniversary Directory graduates of Saint Petersburg State Academic Institute of Painting, Sculpture, and Architecture named after Ilya Repin, Russian Academy of Arts. 1915 - 2005. - Saint Petersburg: Pervotsvet Publishing House, 2007.
