= Bourdelle =

Bourdelle is a surname of French origin. People with that name include:

- Antoine Bourdelle (born Émile Antoine Bordelles, 1861–1929), French sculptor, painter, and teacher
  - List of works by Antoine Bourdelle
  - Musée Bourdelle, Paris, not to be confused with the Musée Ingres Bourdelle, Montauban
- Thomy Bourdelle (1891–1972), French actor

== See also ==
- Bourdelles, a commune in the Gironde department in Nouvelle-Aquitaine in southwestern France
- Pierre de Bourdeille, seigneur de Brantôme (1540–1614), French historian, soldier, and biographer
