= Ivan Chernoknizhny =

Ukrainian anarchist revolutionary

Ivan Chernoknyzhny
- Иван Чернокнижный; Іван Чорнокнижний

Chairman of the Military Revolutionary Council
- In office 12 February – 15 June 1919
- Preceded by: Office established
- Succeeded by: Nestor Makhno

Personal details
- Born: c. 1890s Pavlohrad, Katerynoslav, Russian Empire
- Died: c. 1928 Mezhova, Dnipropetrovsk, Ukraine, Soviet Union
- Party: Left Socialist-Revolutionaries
- Other political affiliations: Makhnovshchina
- Occupation: Teacher

Ivan Sebastyanovich Chernoknizhny (Russian: Иван Себастьянович Чернокнижный; Ukrainian: Іван Себастьянович Чорнокнижний, romanized: Ivan Sebastianovych Chornoknyzhnyi) was a left socialist-revolutionary and a leading member of the Makhnovist movement.

== Biography ==
Ivan Chernoknizhny was born at the end of the nineteenth century in the Pavlohrad Raion of the Katerynoslav Governorate. After receiving his education, he worked as a rural teacher in the village of Novopavlivka, where he became a member of the Party of Left Socialist-Revolutionaries. In the autumn of 1918, he joined the Makhnovist movement and was elected as a delegate for Novopavlivka to the first, second and third Regional Congresses of Peasants, Workers and Insurgents. At the second congress, he was elected as the first chairman of the Military Revolutionary Council (VRS), after he gave a speech in which he denounced the newly established Ukrainian Soviet Socialist Republic:

"The Ukrainian provisional government stood by, first in Moscow and then in Kursk, until the workers and peasants of the Ukraine had liberated the territory of enemies. Now that the enemy is beaten [...] some government appears in our midst describing itself as Bolshevik and aiming to impose its party dictatorship upon us. Is that to be countenanced? We are non-party insurgents, and we have revolted against all our oppressors; we will not countenance a new enslavement, no matter the quarter whence it may come!"

As chairman of the VRS, he oversaw the establishment of the first free soviets in Huliaipole Raion. During his speech at an opening ceremony in Huliaipole, he described the goal of the free soviets to be the establishment of self-governance in Ukraine, outside of the control of any political party. He also noted that Ukrainian peasants had instinctively self-organized many free soviets themselves, indicating widespread popular support for the project. He ended his speech by warning against rising authoritarianism, brought on by both the Bolsheviks and the White movement, calling instead for free soviets to become the nucleus for "real freedom, genuine equality and honest fraternity."

In June 1919, he was outlawed by the Soviet authorities and went underground. He continued to take an active part in the Makhnovist movement, constantly working in the VRS and remaining one of the ideologists of the insurgency. He was again declared an outlaw in January and November 1920. In the 1920s, after the amnesty, he lived in the Mezhova Raion of the Dnipropetrovsk Oblast, where he led the underground Anarcho-Makhnovist group. For his illicit activities, he was arrested in 1928.

== Bibliography ==
- Belash, Alexander; Belash, Victor (1993). Дороги Нестора Махно (in Russian). Kiev: РВЦ "Проза". ISBN 9785770738148. OCLC 429142607.
- Danilov, Victor Petrovich (2006). "Нестор Махно. Крестьянское движение на Украине. 1918—1921: Документы и материалы". In V. Danilov; T. Shanin (eds.). Российская политическая энциклопедия. Крестьянская революция в России. 1902—1922 гг.: Документы и материалы (in Russian). Moscow: ROSSPEN. p. 1000. ISBN 5824307695. OCLC 741204339.
- Skirda, Alexandre (2004) [1982]. Nestor Makhno: Anarchy's Cossack. Translated by Sharkey, Paul. Edinburgh: AK Press. ISBN 1-902593-68-5. OCLC 58872511.
