= Vladimir Yerokhin =

Soviet footballer

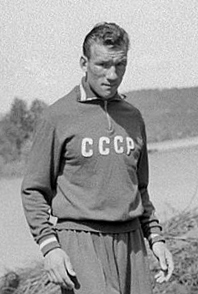
- Vladimir Yerokhin at the 1958 World Cup

Personal information
- Date of birth: 10 April 1930
- Place of birth: Moscow, Russian SFSR, Soviet Union
- Date of death: 6 October 1996 (aged 66)
- Place of death: Kyiv, Ukraine
- Position: Defender

Senior career*
Years	Team	Apps	(Gls)
1952	FC Dynamo Mukachevo		
1953–1961	FC Dynamo Kyiv	120	(1)
1962–1964	FC Avanhard Ternopil	92	(0)

International career
1956	Ukraine	3	(0)
- * Club domestic league appearances and goals

Vladimir Nikitovich Yerokhin (Russian: Владимир Никитович Ерохин, Ukrainian: Володимир Микитович Єрохін, 10 April 1930 – 6 October 1996) was an association footballer from the former Soviet Union who played for FC Dynamo Kyiv. He was born in Moscow, and was a member of the USSR's squad for the 1958 FIFA World Cup, but did not win any caps.

Yerokhin began his club football career with FC Dynamo Kyiv where he would spend nine seasons in the Soviet Top League and win the 1961 championship, before finishing his career with FC Avanhard Ternopil in the Soviet Second League.

In 1956 Yerokhin played a couple of games for Ukraine at the Spartakiad of the Peoples of the USSR. He died in Kyiv, aged 66.
