= 1929 in fine arts of the Soviet Union =

The year 1929 was marked by many events that left an imprint on the history of Soviet and Russian Fine Arts.

== Events ==
- April 29 — The Third Exhibition of works by society «Circle of artists» (Russian: «Круг художников») was opened in Russian museum in Leningrad. Exhibited 183 works of 36 authors. The participants were Alexei Pakhomov, Vecheslav Pakulin, Vladimir Malagis, Akexander Vedernikov, and other important Leningrad artists.
- May 19 — The fourth exhibition of the art association «The Four Arts» was opened in Moscow in the Moscow State University. The participants were Lev Bruni, Aleksei Kravchenko, Pavel Kuznetsov, Vera Mukhina, Kuzma Petrov-Vodkin, Martiros Saryan, Vladimir Favorsky and other important Russian artists.
- The VIII Exhibition of works by artists of the «Society of Arkhip Kuindzhi» was opened in Leningrad in the Academy of Arts. Exhibited 476 works of painting and sculpture of 73 authors. The participants were Mikhail Avilov, Isaak Brodsky, Alexander Lubimov, Arcady Rylov, Ivan Stepashkin, and other important Russian realist artists.

== Births ==
- February 6 — Boris Maluev (Russian: Борис Яковлевич Малуев), Soviet Russian painter (d. 1987).
- February 17 — Galina Smirnova (Russian: Галина Александровна Смирнова, Soviet Russian painter (d. 2015).

== Deaths ==
- March 2 — Nikolai Kuznetsov, Ukrainian painter and art professor at the St. Petersburg Imperial Academy of Arts (b.1850).
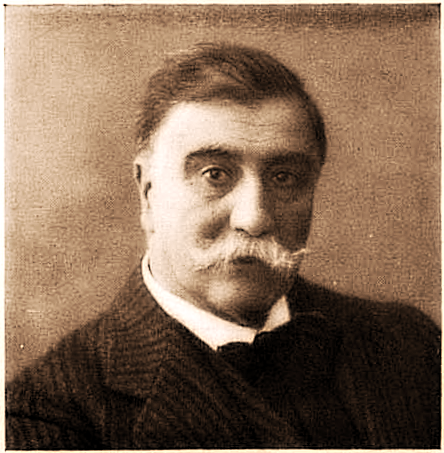

== See also ==
- List of Russian artists
- List of painters of Leningrad Union of Artists
- Saint Petersburg Union of Artists
- Russian culture
- 1929 in the Soviet Union

== Sources ==
- III Выставка картин и скульптуры. Общество «Круг художников. Л., Русский музей, 1929.
- Каталог выставки художников общества "4 искусства". М., 1929.
- Каталог выставки картин Общества имени А. И. Куинджи в залах Вхутеин. Л., 1929.
- Выставка картин и скульптуры 06щества «Круг художников». Л., Изд. клуба завода «Красный Треугольник», 1929.
- Каталог 8-й выставки картин Общества художников-индивидуалистов. Л., 1929.
- Каталог выставки картин московских и ленинградских художников, организованной к 25-летию художественной и педагогической деятельности проф. Д. Н. Кордовокого. М., 1929.
- Artists of Peoples of the USSR. Biography Dictionary. Vol. 1. Moscow, Iskusstvo, 1970.
- Artists of Peoples of the USSR. Biography Dictionary. Vol. 2. Moscow, Iskusstvo, 1972.
- Directory of Members of Union of Artists of USSR. Volume 1,2. Moscow, Soviet Artist Edition, 1979.
- Directory of Members of the Leningrad branch of the Union of Artists of Russian Federation. Leningrad, Khudozhnik RSFSR, 1980.
- Artists of Peoples of the USSR. Biography Dictionary. Vol. 4 Book 1. Moscow, Iskusstvo, 1983.
- Directory of Members of the Leningrad branch of the Union of Artists of Russian Federation. - Leningrad: Khudozhnik RSFSR, 1987.
- Персональные и групповые выставки советских художников. 1917-1947 гг. М., Советский художник, 1989.
- Artists of peoples of the USSR. Biography Dictionary. Vol. 4 Book 2. - Saint Petersburg: Academic project humanitarian agency, 1995.
- Link of Times: 1932 - 1997. Artists - Members of Saint Petersburg Union of Artists of Russia. Exhibition catalogue. - Saint Petersburg: Manezh Central Exhibition Hall, 1997.
- Matthew C. Bown. Dictionary of 20th Century Russian and Soviet Painters 1900-1980s. - London: Izomar, 1998.
- Vern G. Swanson. Soviet Impressionism. - Woodbridge, England: Antique Collectors' Club, 2001.
- Sergei V. Ivanov. Unknown Socialist Realism. The Leningrad School. - Saint-Petersburg: NP-Print Edition, 2007. - ISBN 5-901724-21-6, ISBN 978-5-901724-21-7.
- Anniversary Directory graduates of Saint Petersburg State Academic Institute of Painting, Sculpture, and Architecture named after Ilya Repin, Russian Academy of Arts. 1915 - 2005. - Saint Petersburg: Pervotsvet Publishing House, 2007.
