= 1991 in art =

Events from the year 1991 in art.

== Events ==
- 14 April – In the Netherlands, thieves steal 20 paintings worth $500 million from the Van Gogh Museum in Amsterdam. Less than an hour later they are found in an abandoned car near the museum.
- 25 May – Opening of the Irish Museum of Modern Art in Dublin.
- 9 July – The Sainsbury Wing of the National Gallery in London, designed by Robert Venturi and Denise Scott, is opened.
- September – Opening of the Weserburg modern art museum in Bremen (Germany) as the Neues Museum Weserburg Bremen.

== Publications ==
- The Prince of Wales (now Charles III) - Watercolours.
- Eric Hebborn, Drawn to Trouble

== Exhibitions ==
- February 6 until May 6 - Albert Bierstadt, Art & Enterprise at the Brooklyn Museum in Brooklyn, New York.
- December 13 until February 2, 1992 - Damien Hirst solo exhibition at Institute of Contemporary Arts.

== Dance ==
- May – First performance of Candoco Dance Company

== Awards ==
- John Moores Painting Prize - Andrzej Jackowski for "The Beekeeper's son"
- Turner Prize – Anish Kapoor

== Works ==
- Las niñas en la alborada – Félix Aráuz
- "The Umbrellas" (simultaneous sculptural instillations in California, U.S.A. and Japan) – Christo and Jeanne Claude
- Chain Reaction (sculpture, Santa Monica, California) – Paul Conrad
- Field (multiple figure sculptures in terracotta - first version) – Antony Gormley
- Isolated Elements Swimming in the Same Direction for the Purposes of Understanding – Damien Hirst
- The Physical Impossibility of Death in the Mind of Someone Living – Damien Hirst
- Capitalism (sculpture in Portland, Oregon) – Larry Kirkland
- Guardians of the Gate (bronze, San Francisco) – Miles Metzger
- PBS 1963-2000 (electric image components and neon, sculpture, Trenton, new Jersey) - Nam Jun Paik
- Cold Dark Matter: An Exploded View (installation) – Cornelia Parker
- Tompkins Square Crawl (performance) - William Pope.L
- Self (sculpted self-portrait head in artist's blood - first version) – Marc Quinn
- Host Analog (sculpture, Portland, Oregon) – Buster Simpson
- Cascade Charley (fountain, Eugene, Oregon) – Alice Wingwall
- La Familia Pomare – Aline Amaru

== Births ==
- Hannah Levy, American sculptor
- Probable date – Cartяain, English graffiti urban artist

== Deaths ==
=== January to June ===
- 3 January – Doris Zinkeisen, British theatrical designer and commercial artist (b. 1898).
- 11 January – Charles Mozley, British artist and art teacher (b. 1914)
- 7 February – Jean-Paul Mousseau, Canadian artist (b. 1927).
- 13 February – Arno Breker, German sculptor (b. 1900).
- 15 March – Vladimir Seleznev, Russian painter (b. 1928).
- 29 March – Guy Bourdin, French photographer (b. 1928).
- 10 June – Jean Bruller, French writer and illustrator (b. 1902).

=== July to December ===
- 16 July – Robert Motherwell, American abstract expressionist painter and printmaker (b. 1915).
- 3 August – Boris Ugarov, Russian painter, a last President of the Academy of Arts of the USSR (b. 1922).
- 30 August – Jean Tinguely, Swiss painter and sculptor (b. 1925).
- 5 September
  - Alexander Pushnin, Russian painter and art educator (b. 1921).
  - Princess Fahrelnissa Zeid, Turkish abstract artist (b. 1901).
- 14 September – Russell Lynes, American art historian, photographer and author (b. 1910).
- 18 September - Leland Bell, American painter (b. 1922).
- 24 September – Dr. Seuss, American illustrator (b. 1904).
- 8 October – David Budd, American abstract painter (b. 1927)
- 27 October – Pyke Koch, Dutch painter (b. 1901).
- 7 November – Tom of Finland, Finnish fetish artist (b. 1920).
- 11 November – Nadezhda Shteinmiller, Russian painter and theater artist (b. 1915).
- 18 November – Reg Parlett, English comics artist (b. 1904).
- 21 November – Joseph Delaney, American painter (b. 1904).
- 8 December - Bernice Abbott, American photographer (b. 1898).
- 9 December
  - Greta Kempton, Austrian-American artist (b. 1901).
  - Gisèle Lestrange, French graphic artist (b. 1927).
- 12 December - Moshe Castel, Israeli painter (b. 1909).

== See also ==
- 1991 in Fine Arts of the Soviet Union
