= 1922 in the Soviet Union =

- Decades: 1920s; 1930s; 1940s
- See also: History of the Soviet Union; List of years in the Soviet Union

The following lists events that happened during 1922 in the Union of Soviet Socialist Republics.

== Incumbents ==
- General Secretary of the Communist Party of the Soviet Union – Joseph Stalin (starting 3 April)
- Chairman of the Central Executive Committee of the Congress of Soviets – Mikhail Kalinin (starting 30 December)
- Chairman of the Council of People's Commissars of the Soviet Union – Vladimir Lenin (starting 30 December)

== Events ==
=== February ===
- 5-14 February – Battle of Volochayevka

=== March ===
- 27 March – 2 April – 11th Congress of the Russian Communist Party (Bolsheviks)

=== Fall ===
Mass expulsions of intellectuals on the so-called Philosophers' ships and later by rail.

=== December ===
- 30 December – First All-Union Congress of Soviets
  - 30 December – Central Executive Committee of the Soviet Union
- 30 December – The Declaration of the Creation of the USSR is ratified.
- 30 December – Treaty on the Creation of the Union of Soviet Socialist Republics

== Births ==
- 5 January – Aleksey Gushchin, Olympic shooting champion (died 1986)
- 7 March – Olga Ladyzhenskaya, mathematician
- 20 March – Irina Antonova, art historian (died 2020)
- 30 March – Konstantin Kabanov, Soviet Air Force pilot and Hero of the Soviet Union
- 1 December – Vsevolod Bobrov, Olympic footballer
- 2 December – Ekaterina Kalinchuk, Olympic gymnast
- 12 December – Vasily Borisov, Olympic shooting champion (died 2003)
- 23 December – Sofya Kondakova, speed skater
- 27 December – Yevheniia Kucherenko, pedagogue
- date unknown – Ilya Timofeyevich Osipov, Red Army soldier and Hero of the Soviet Union

== See also ==
- 1922 in fine arts of the Soviet Union
- List of Soviet films of 1922
