= 1991 in fine arts of the Soviet Union and Russia =

The year 1991 was marked by many events that left an imprint on the history of Soviet and Russian Fine Arts. After the opening of the former Soviet Union to the world (Glasnost and Perestroika), it started to show to the world more of its arts.

== Events ==
- Annual exhibition of Leningrad artists — veterans of the Great Patriotic War opens in the premises of the Leningrad Union of Artists. Participants: Iya Venkova, Nikolai Kochukov, Alexander Gulyaev, Oleg Yeremeev, Ruben Zakharian, Mikhail Kozell, Gevork Kotiantz, Alexander Koroviakov, Tatiana Kopnina, Alexander Ketov, Oleg Lomakin, Yuri Neprintsev, Rostislav Vovkushevsky, Alexander Pushnin, Evgeny Pozdnekov, Semion Rotnitsky, Arseny Semionov, Alexander Tatarenko, Nikolai Timkov, Mikhail Tkachev, Sergei Frolov, Alexander Shmidt and others.
- Exhibition of works by Sergei Osipov (1915–1985) was opened in the Leningrad Union of Artists.
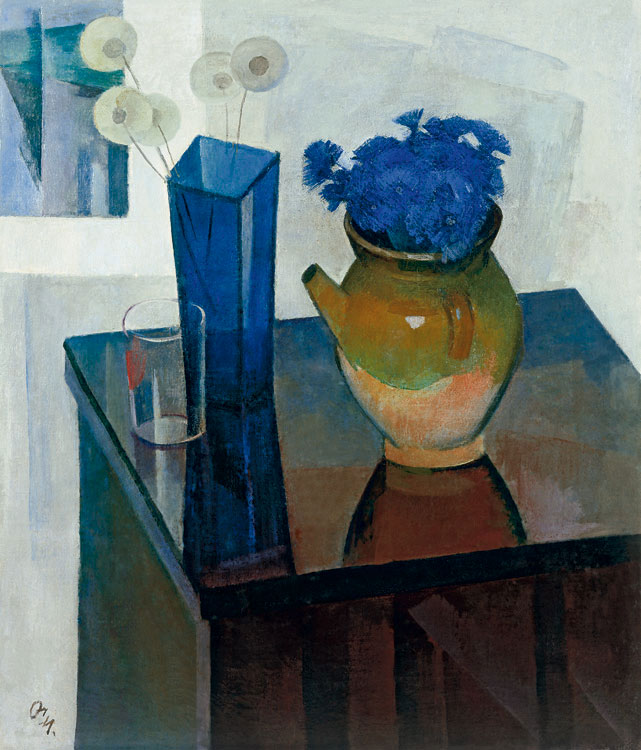
Cornflowers. 1976
- Exhibition of works by Gleb Savinov was opened in the Leningrad Union of Artists.
- Exhibition of works by Semion Rotnitsky was opened in the Leningrad Union of Artists.
- Exhibition of works by Vasily Golubev (1925–1985) was opened in the Leningrad Union of Artists.
- Exhibition of works by Vitaly Tulenev (1937–1998) was opened in the Leningrad Union of Artists.
- New Russian Art Auction "L' École de Leningrad", "Charmes Russes", "Leningrad Figuration", "Peinture Russe" took place in Paris, France. Participants: Piotr Alberti, Nikolai Baskakov, Olga Bogaevskaya, Oleg Lomakin, Filaret Pakun, Victor Reikhet, Alexander Samokhvalov, Elena Tabakova, Alexandra Tokareva and other artists.
- Exhibition of works by Mikhail Kozell (1911–1993) was opened in the Leningrad Union of Artists.

== Deaths ==
- February 14 — Kim Slavin (Russian: Славин Ким Николаевич), Russian soviet painter (born 1928).
- February 27 — Alla Nikolaeva (Russian: Николаева Алла Николаевна), Russian soviet painter (born 1916).
- March 15 — Vladimir Seleznev (Russian: Селезнёв Владимир Иванович), Russian soviet painter (born 1928).
- July 6 — Victor Korovin (Russian: Коровин Виктор Иванович), Russian soviet painter (born 1936).
- August 3 — Boris Ugarov (Russian: Угаров Борис Сергеевич), Russian soviet painter and art educator, Honored Artist of the RSFSR (born 1922).
- September 5 — Alexander Pushnin (Russian: Пушнин Александр Тихонович), Russian soviet painter (born 1921).
- September 6 — Tatiana Gagarina (Russian: Гагарина Татьяна Алексеевна), Russian soviet sculptor (born 1941).
- October 1 — Victor Teterin (Russian: Тетерин Виктор Кузьмич), Russian soviet painter (born 1922).
- October 21 — Lev Chegorovsky (Russian: Чегоровский Лев Ильич), Russian soviet painter (born 1914).
- October 31 — Elena Zhukova (Russian: Жукова Елена Павловна), Russian soviet painter (born 1906).
- November 11 — Mikhail Kuprijanov (Russian: Куприянов, Михаил Васильевич), Russian soviet painter, People's Artist of the USSR, Stalin Prize winner, Lenin Prize winner (born 1903).
- November 11 — Nadezhda Shteinmiller (Russian: Штейнмиллер Надежда Павловна), Russian soviet painter and theatre artist (born 1915).
- November 19 — Vasily Korolev (Russian: Королёв Василий Андреевич), Russian soviet painter and art educator (born 1911).
- November 23 — Nikolai Buranov (Russian: Буранов Николай Алексеевич), Russian soviet painter (born 1920).
- December 10 — Yuri Mikhailov (Russian: Михайлов Юрий Данилович), Russian soviet painter (born 1933).

== See also ==
- List of Russian artists
- List of painters of Leningrad Union of Artists
- Saint Petersburg Union of Artists
- Culture of the Soviet Union
- Culture of Russia
- 1991 in the Soviet Union and Russia

== Sources ==
- Выставка произведений художников-ветеранов Великой Отечественной войны. Л., ЛОСХ, 1991.
- Сергей Иванович Осипов. Выставка произведений. Каталог. Л., Художник РСФСР, 1990.
- Глеб Александрович Савинов. Выставка произведений. Каталог. Л., Художник РСФСР, 1991.
- Василий Васильевич Голубев. Выставка произведений. Каталог. Л., Художник РСФСР, 1991.
- Виталий Иванович Тюленев. Выставка произведений. Каталог. Л., Художник РСФСР, 1991.
- Семен Аронович Ротницкий. Выставка произведений. Каталог. Л., Художник РСФСР, 1991.
- Михаил Георгиевич Козелл. Выставка произведений. Каталог. Л., Художник РСФСР, 1989.
- L' Ecole de Leningrad. Catalogue. Paris, Drouot Richelieu. 1991, 25 Novembre.
- Painture Russe. Catalogue. Paris, Drouot Richelieu. 1991, February 18,.
- Painture Russe. Catalogue. Paris, Drouot Richelieu. 1991, April 26,.
- Charmes Russes. Catalogue. Paris, Drouot Richelieu. 1991, 15 Mai.
- Leningrad figuration. Catalogue. Paris, Drouot Richelieu. 1991, June 10,.
- Charmes Russes. Catalogue. Paris, Drouot Richelieu. 1991, 9 Decembre.
- Artists of Peoples of the USSR. Biography Dictionary. Vol. 1. Moscow, Iskusstvo, 1970.
- Artists of Peoples of the USSR. Biography Dictionary. Vol. 2. Moscow, Iskusstvo, 1972.
- Directory of Members of Union of Artists of USSR. Volume 1,2. Moscow, Soviet Artist Edition, 1979.
- Directory of Members of the Leningrad branch of the Union of Artists of Russian Federation. Leningrad, Khudozhnik RSFSR, 1980.
- Artists of Peoples of the USSR. Biography Dictionary. Vol. 4 Book 1. Moscow, Iskusstvo, 1983.
- Directory of Members of the Leningrad branch of the Union of Artists of Russian Federation. – Leningrad: Khudozhnik RSFSR, 1987.
- Artists of peoples of the USSR. Biography Dictionary. Vol. 4 Book 2. – Saint Petersburg: Academic project humanitarian agency, 1995.
- Link of Times: 1932 – 1997. Artists – Members of Saint Petersburg Union of Artists of Russia. Exhibition catalogue. – Saint Petersburg: Manezh Central Exhibition Hall, 1997.
- Matthew C. Bown. Dictionary of 20th Century Russian and Soviet Painters 1900-1980s. – London: Izomar, 1998.
- Vern G. Swanson. Soviet Impressionism. – Woodbridge, England: Antique Collectors' Club, 2001.
- Время перемен. Искусство 1960—1985 в Советском Союзе. СПб., Государственный Русский музей, 2006.
- Anniversary Directory graduates of Saint Petersburg State Academic Institute of Painting, Sculpture, and Architecture named after Ilya Repin, Russian Academy of Arts. 1915 – 2005. – Saint Petersburg: Pervotsvet Publishing House, 2007.
