= 1928 in fine arts of the Soviet Union =

The year 1928 was marked by many events that left an imprint on the history of Soviet and Russian Fine Arts.

== Events ==
- January 29 — Exhibition of works by Moscow artistic group «A Being» (Russian: «Бытиё») was opened in Moscow in the building of the old Moscow University. Exhibited 226 works of 22 authors.
- March 3 — Exhibition of works by artistic group «The Four Arts» (Russian: «4 Искусства») was opened in Russian museum in Leningrad. Exhibited 284 works of 51 authors. The participants were Meer Akselrod, Lev Bruny, Alexei Karev, Aleksei Kravchenko, Nikolai Lapshin, Alexander Matveyev, Kuzma Petrov-Vodkin, Piotr Utkin, and other important Leningrad artists.
- The VII Exhibition of works by artists of the «Society of Arkhip Kuindzhi» was opened in March in Leningrad in the apartments of former Imperial Society for the Encouragement of the Arts (since 1932 located Leningrad Union of Artist). Exhibited 521 works of painting and sculpture of 78 authors. The participants were Piotr Buchkin, Arcady Rylov, Ivan Stepashkin, and other important Russian realist artists.
- Exhibition «Modern Leningrad artistic groupments» was opened in Leningrad. Exhibited 164 works of 93 artists from different art groups include «Society of Arkhip Kuindzhi», «Four Arts», Leningrad branch of AKhRR, Pavel Filonov group, and others. The participants were Kuzma Petrov-Vodkin, Alexei Pakhomov, Vecheslav Pakulin, Alexander Samokhvalov, and other important Leningrad artists.

== Deaths ==
- February 19 — Vasily Belajev (Russian: Беляев Василий Васильевич), Russian painter, monumental artist, and art educator (born 1867).
- November 5 — Victor Zarubin (Russian: Зарубин Виктор Иванович), Russian artist (born 1866).

== See also ==
- List of Russian artists
- List of painters of Leningrad Union of Artists
- Saint Petersburg Union of Artists
- Russian culture
- 1928 in the Soviet Union

== Sources ==
- Каталог 6-й выставки картин Общества художников «Бытие». М., 1-й МГУ, 1928.
- Каталог выставки картин Общества им. А. И. Куинджи в залах Общества поощрения художеств. Л., 1928.
- Круг. 2-я выставка. Л., Русский музей, 1928.
- Каталог выставки Общества художников «4 искусства». Л., Государственный Русский музей, 1928.
- Каталог VII выставки картин. Общество художников-индивидуалистов. Л., 1928.
- Каталог VII выставки. Октябрь — ноябрь 1928. Л., Община художников, 1928.
- Каталог. Общество им. А. И. Куинджи, АХРР, «Круг», «4 искусства». Школа Филонова. Выставка картин и скульптуры. Современные ленинградские художественные группировки. Л., Ленинградский областной Совет профессиональных союзов Дома культуры, 1928—1929.
- Artists of Peoples of the USSR. Biography Dictionary. Vol. 1. Moscow, Iskusstvo, 1970.
- Artists of Peoples of the USSR. Biography Dictionary. Vol. 2. Moscow, Iskusstvo, 1972.
- Directory of Members of Union of Artists of USSR. Volume 1,2. Moscow, Soviet Artist Edition, 1979.
- Directory of Members of the Leningrad branch of the Union of Artists of Russian Federation. Leningrad, Khudozhnik RSFSR, 1980.
- Artists of Peoples of the USSR. Biography Dictionary. Vol. 4 Book 1. Moscow, Iskusstvo, 1983.
- Directory of Members of the Leningrad branch of the Union of Artists of Russian Federation. - Leningrad: Khudozhnik RSFSR, 1987.
- Персональные и групповые выставки советских художников. 1917-1947 гг. М., Советский художник, 1989.
- Artists of peoples of the USSR. Biography Dictionary. Vol. 4 Book 2. - Saint Petersburg: Academic project humanitarian agency, 1995.
- Link of Times: 1932 - 1997. Artists - Members of Saint Petersburg Union of Artists of Russia. Exhibition catalogue. - Saint Petersburg: Manezh Central Exhibition Hall, 1997.
- Matthew C. Bown. Dictionary of 20th Century Russian and Soviet Painters 1900-1980s. - London: Izomar, 1998.
- Vern G. Swanson. Soviet Impressionism. - Woodbridge, England: Antique Collectors' Club, 2001.
- Sergei V. Ivanov. Unknown Socialist Realism. The Leningrad School. - Saint-Petersburg: NP-Print Edition, 2007. - ISBN 5-901724-21-6, ISBN 978-5-901724-21-7.
- Anniversary Directory graduates of Saint Petersburg State Academic Institute of Painting, Sculpture, and Architecture named after Ilya Repin, Russian Academy of Arts. 1915 - 2005. - Saint Petersburg: Pervotsvet Publishing House, 2007.
