= 1928 in the Soviet Union =

- Decades: 1920s; 1930s; 1940s
- See also: History of the Soviet Union; List of years in the Soviet Union

The following lists events that happened during 1928 in the Union of Soviet Socialist Republics.

== Incumbents ==
- General Secretary of the Communist Party of the Soviet Union – Joseph Stalin
- Chairman of the Central Executive Committee of the Congress of Soviets – Mikhail Kalinin
- Chairman of the Council of People's Commissars of the Soviet Union – Alexei Rykov

== Events ==
- October 1 – The first five-year plan is implemented.

=== May ===
- 18 May – The Shakhty Trial begins.

== Births ==
- 18 January – Alexander Gomelsky, basketball coach
- 10 February – Alma Adamkienė, Lithuanian philologist, philanthropist and First Lady of Lithuania
- 5 March – Yelizaveta Dementyeva, sprint canoeist
- 7 March – Edgar Elbakyan, Armenian actor (d. 1988)
- 20 March – Khanifa Iskandarova, Russian educator (d. 2020)
- 10 April – Raïssa Koublitskaïa, Belarusian agricultural worker and politician (d. 2021)
- 25 April – Yury Yakovlev, actor
- 14 May – Algirdas Šocikas, Lithuanian Olympic heavyweight boxer (d. 2012)
- 28 May – Ivan Kizimov, Olympic equestrian
- 2 July – Tatyana Piletskaya, actress
- 13 July – Valentin Pikul, novelist
- 15 July – Aleksandr Zasukhin, Soviet boxer (d. 2012)
- 30 July – Valentin Muratov, Olympic gymnast
- 2 September – Muhammad Dandamayev, Babylonia historian (d. 2017)
- 22 November – Valentin Galochkin, sculptor
- 29 November – Tahir Salahov, Azerbaijani painter and educator
- 8 December – Ekaterina Salnikova, Russian chemist
- 25 December – Olga Moiseeva, ballerina and teacher
- 31 December – Tatyana Shmyga, actress

== Deaths ==
- 7 April – Alexander Bogdanov, Bolshevik (born 1873)

== See also ==
- 1928 in fine arts of the Soviet Union
- List of Soviet films of 1928
- Soviet grain procurement crisis of 1928
