= Cascade Charley =

Fountain and sculpture in Eugene, Oregon, U.S.

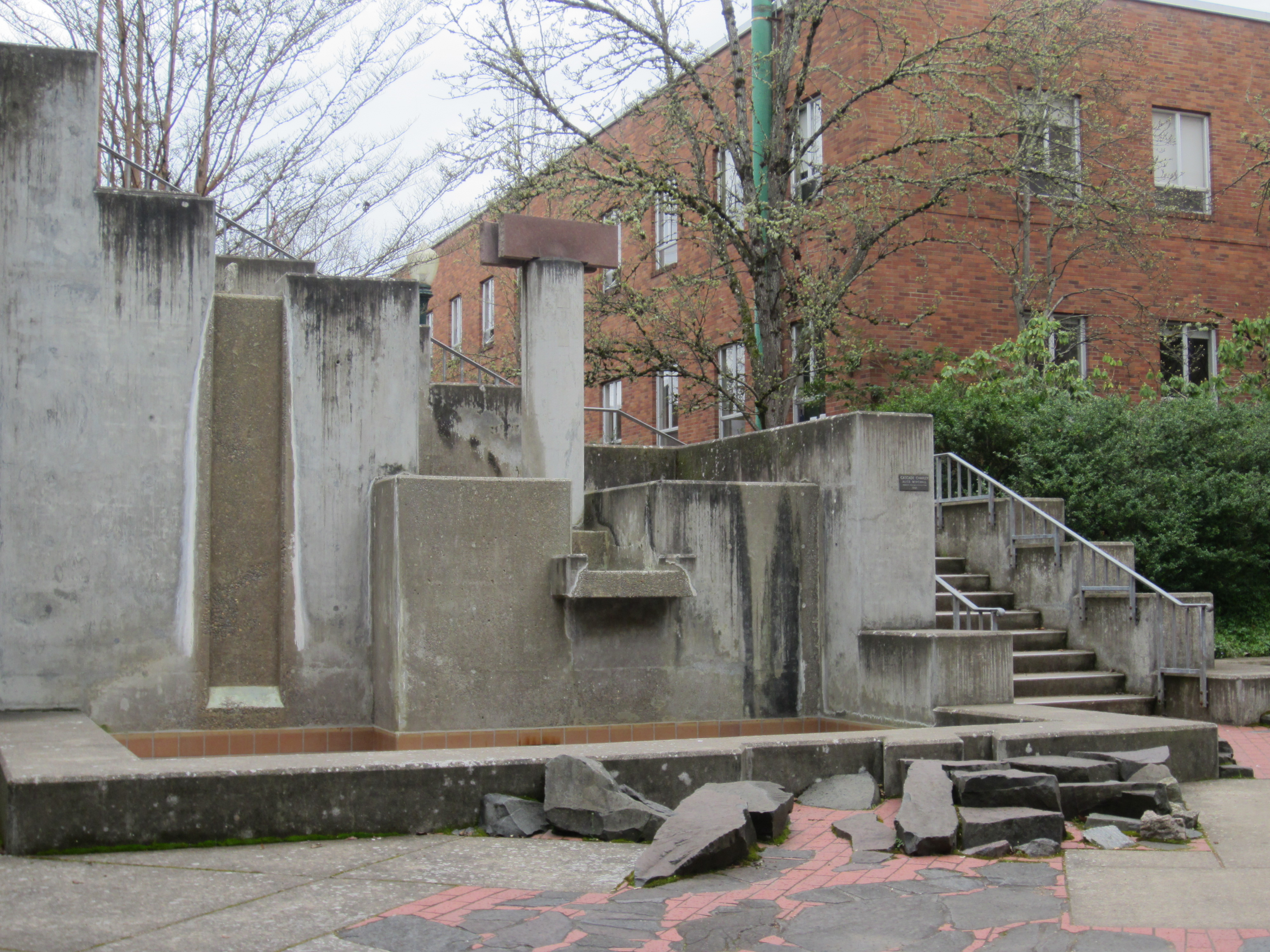
- The fountain and sculpture in 2014
- Artist: Alice Wingwall
- Year: 1991
- Type: Fountain; sculpture
- Medium: Concrete; tile; red marble
- Location: Eugene, Oregon, United States; 44.04605°N 123.07388°W

Cascade Charley is an outdoor 1991 fountain and sculpture by Alice Wingwall, installed in Cascade Courtyard, on the University of Oregon campus in Eugene, Oregon, United States. It is made of concrete, tile, and red marble.

== See also ==
- 1991 in art
