= Elena Akselrod =

Russian poet and translator

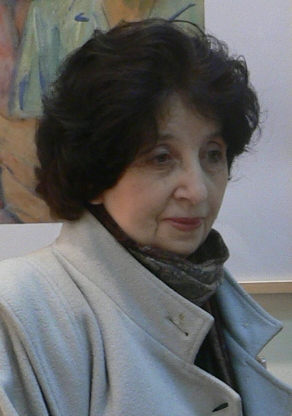
- Akselrod in 2010
- Born: 1932 (age 93–94); Minsk, Byelorussian SSR, Soviet Union
- Occupation: Writer

Elena Meerovna Akselrod (Russian: Еле́на Ме́еровна Аксельро́д, IPA: [jɪˈlʲɛnə ˈmʲejɪrəvnə ɐksʲɪlʲˈrot]; Belarusian: Алена Меераўна Аксельрод; born 1932 in Minsk, Belarus) is a Russian poet and translator. She is the daughter of noted artist Meer Akselrod, and wrote a monograph about her father.

== Biography ==
Akselrod was born in Minsk in 1932. Her father was the artist Meer Akselrod and her mother was the Yiddish poet, Riva Rubina. Her uncle Zelik Akserlod was also a Yiddish poet; he tried to protest against closure of Yiddish schools in USSR and was arrested and eventually executed during the Red Army retreat from Vilnius in 1941.

Elena Akselrod graduated from the literary department of Moskovsky Pedagogichesky Institute (Moscow Pedagogical Institute) in 1954, and made her début as a translator in 1955. She published her first book of poetry for children in 1961 - since then she has written a further seven books of poetry. During Soviet times she worked as translator, translating from Yiddish, German, English, and other languages. She translated the works of her mother Riva Rubina.

Since 1991 Akselrod has lived in Israel, where she has written books and translated others from Hebrew. Her work is published in Israel, the United States, and Russia. She wrote a study on the art of her father Meer Akselrod, which made him known outside of Russia. In 2008, her book of memoirs A Yard on Barrikadny street was published.

Her son is Russian-Israeli artist Michael Yachilevich.
