= 1922 in fine arts of the Soviet Union =

The year 1922 was marked by many events that left an imprint on the history of Soviet and Russian Fine Arts.

== Events ==
- The last Exhibition of the oldest Russian art group Peredvizhniki was opened in the apartments of former Imperial Society for the Encouragement of the Arts. The participants were Mikhail Avilov, Isaak Brodsky, Konstantin Gorbatov, Nikolay Dubovskoy, Aleksandr Makovsky, Vladimir Makovsky, and other important Russian artists.
- The Exhibition of Mir iskusstva art group was opened in Petrograd in the Museum of City (former Anichkov Palace). The participants were Alexandre Benois, Mstislav Dobuzhinsky, Vladimir Konashevich, Elizaveta Kruglikova, Boris Kustodiev, Alexander Matveyev, Dmitry Mitrokhin, Anna Ostroumova-Lebedeva, Kuzma Petrov-Vodkin, Zinaida Serebriakova, Georgy Vereisky, Vsevolod Voinov, and other important Russian artists.
- The Peredvizhniki group was halted by the existence. In his place the «Association of Artists of Revolutionary Russia» (Russian: Ассоциация художников революционной России, Assotsiatsia Khudozhnikov Revolutsionnoi Rossii, 1922–1928) was formed in Moscow (AKhRR). A head of Petrograd AKhRR branch of was elected artist Nikolai Dormidontov.
- A works of art castings named Monumentsculpture was founded in Petrograd on the base of private foundry. The current name the plant received in 1939.
- The First Russian Art Exhibition organised by David Shterenberg in Berlin.

== Births ==
- January 6 — Nina Veselova (Russian: Нина Леонидовна Веселова), Russian soviet painter (died 1960).
- February 15 — Boris Korneev (Russian: Борис Васильевич Корнеев), Russian soviet painter and art educator, Honored Artist of the RSFSR (died 1973).
- February 18 — Alexander Semionov (Russian: Александр Михайлович Семёнов), Russian soviet painter (died 1984).
- October 25 — Victor Teterin (Russian: Виктор Кузьмич Тетерин), Russian soviet painter and graphic artist (died 1991).

== See also ==
- List of Russian artists
- List of painters of Leningrad Union of Artists
- Saint Petersburg Union of Artists
- Russian culture
- 1922 in the Soviet Union

== Sources ==
- Мир искусства. Петроград, Аничков дворец, 1922.
- Белобородов И. М., Зяблова Г. Г. Отлитая в бронзе. История ленинградского завода художественного литья «Монументскульптура». Л., Лениздат, 1985.
- Янов А. Передвижники//«Жизнь искусства». Петроград, 4 апреля 1922, № 14.
- В Академии художеств//«Жизнь искусства». Петроград, 29 мая 1922, № 21.
- Лапшин Н. Обзор новых течений//«Жизнь искусства». Петроград, 11 июня 1922, № 27.
- Artists of Peoples of the USSR. Biobibliography Dictionary. Vol. 1. Moscow, Iskusstvo, 1970.
- Artists of Peoples of the USSR. Biobibliography Dictionary. Vol. 2. Moscow, Iskusstvo, 1972.
- Directory of Members of Union of Artists of USSR. Volume 1,2. Moscow, Soviet Artist Edition, 1979.
- Directory of Members of the Leningrad branch of the Union of Artists of Russian Federation. Leningrad, Khudozhnik RSFSR, 1980.
- Artists of Peoples of the USSR. Biobibliography Dictionary. Vol. 4 Book 1. Moscow, Iskusstvo, 1983.
- Directory of Members of the Leningrad branch of the Union of Artists of Russian Federation. - Leningrad: Khudozhnik RSFSR, 1987.
- Персональные и групповые выставки советских художников. 1917-1947 гг. М., Советский художник, 1989.
- Artists of peoples of the USSR. Biobibliography Dictionary. Vol. 4 Book 2. - Saint Petersburg: Academic project humanitarian agency, 1995.
- Link of Times: 1932 - 1997. Artists - Members of Saint Petersburg Union of Artists of Russia. Exhibition catalogue. - Saint Petersburg: Manezh Central Exhibition Hall, 1997.
- Matthew C. Bown. Dictionary of 20th Century Russian and Soviet Painters 1900-1980s. - London: Izomar, 1998.
- Vern G. Swanson. Soviet Impressionism. - Woodbridge, England: Antique Collectors' Club, 2001.
- Время перемен. Искусство 1960—1985 в Советском Союзе. СПб., Государственный Русский музей, 2006.
- Sergei V. Ivanov. Unknown Socialist Realism. The Leningrad School. - Saint-Petersburg: NP-Print Edition, 2007. - ISBN 5-901724-21-6, ISBN 978-5-901724-21-7.
- Anniversary Directory graduates of Saint Petersburg State Academic Institute of Painting, Sculpture, and Architecture named after Ilya Repin, Russian Academy of Arts. 1915 - 2005. - Saint Petersburg: Pervotsvet Publishing House, 2007.
