= Guardians of the Gate =

Sculpture in San Francisco, California, U.S.

- Guardians of the Gate in 2012
- Artist: Miles Metzger
- Year: 1991
- Type: Sculpture
- Medium: Everdur bronze
- Subject: Family of sea lions
- Location: San Francisco, California, United States; 37°48′31″N 122°24′39″W

Guardians of the Gate is a 1991 Everdur bronze sculpture depicting a family of sea lions by Miles Metzger, located northwest of Pier 39 and adjacent to the Embarcadero Center in San Francisco, California, United States. The sculpture was dedicated on January 22, 1992, and was surveyed by the Smithsonian Institution's Save Outdoor Sculpture! program the same year. It is administered by Pier 39 Limited Partnership Beach Street and the Embarcadero Center.

Guardians of the Gate, which depicts a "nuzzling" male and female with a pup, was created in 1990 and cast in 1991. Metzger considers the sculpture one of his favorite pieces. He said of his work: "(My) sculptures mean to inspire, encourage and appreciate humanity and the natural world. The family (of sea lions) seemed such a beautiful, emotional moment." Metzger claims he knew that sea lions would be the subjects of his work upon learning the statue had been commissioned by the pier's owner. In 2012, he said of the sculpture's prominent placement: "I've been told by many people it is (one of the) most photographed pieces of sculpture in the United States. It's so populated in that particular spot. Everybody sees that piece. It's one of those places where you can sit on the sculpture and get your picture taken."

== See also ==
- 1991 in art
