= Georgy Vereisky =

Russian artist (1886–1962)

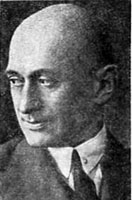
- Born: 30 July 1886; Proskurov, Proskurov uezd, Podolia Governorate, Russian Empire
- Died: 18 December 1962 (aged 76); Leningrad, Russian SFSR, Soviet Union
- Awards: Stalin Prize, 2nd class (1946)

Georgy Semyonovich Vereisky (Russian: Гео́ргий Семёнович Вере́йский; 30 July 1886 – 18 December 1962) was a Russian draughtsman and painter during the Soviet era, active in Leningrad.

== Life ==
Vereisky was born in Proskurov (now Khmelnytskyi) and died in Leningrad. A graduate of the Law Faculty of Petersburg University, he had no systematic artistic training, but learnt the basic principles of painting and drawing in the studio of the Kharkov artist E. Schreider and later, in Petersburg, in the New Art Workshop run by Kustodiev, Lanceray, Ostroumova-Lebedeva and Dobuzhinsky. He began his artistic career as a painter (Autumn, 1915), but soon turned to graphics; he worked in water-colours and lithography, and produced some pen drawings for the journals Teatr i Iskusstvo (Theatre and Art) and Golos Zhizni (The Voice of Life).

In the 1920s, the portrait and the landscape became the chief genres of Vereisky's work, and lithography, etching and water-colour emerged as his favourite media, e.g. in the series of portraits Russian Artists (1922), Artists and Architects (1927), Russian Writers (1927), in the series The Village (1922-24), Industrial Series (1927), and The Garden of the Russian Museum (1925). From 1918 until 1930, Vereisky was curator of the Department of Prints and Drawings in the Hermitage, and this had its effect on the development of his art; in his portraits in particular, we can see the influence of his study of the Old Masters. Vereisky was fortunate enough to have the opportunity of drawing Lenin from life; these studies he later developed into the lithograph Lenin at the Rostrum (1924), one of the first portraits of the leader. He also painted a series of portraits of Soviet statesmen, including those of Kalinin (1932) and Ordzhonikidze (1936), as well as portraits of aviators (more than two hundred of them, 1936), scholars and artists. These works, which constitute an impressive portrait gallery of the men of our time, have a great historical value, and are remarkable for the faithful likenesses they offer and the psychological insight into the characters.

Vereisky's landscapes, even the most unassuming ones, are always marked by lyricism and poetical feeling, e.g. Bolshoi Prospekt: Vasilyevsky Island (1937), and Hoar-frost (1938). During the war, Vereisky lived in the besieged Leningrad until 1942, taking an active part in the work of the artistic group "The Pencil at War". He produced a series of portraits of men serving in the Soviet army, navy and air-force (1942-43), as well as of scholars and artists (1944-45). In the latter years of his life, he continued his portrait work and also painted many landscapes; all these display a remarkable depth of feeling and a joie de vivre, e.g. the portraits of the artists Konionkov and Yablonskaya (both 1954), Lake with Trees (1952), Birches (1955), and Forest Lake (1957).

== See also ==
- List of Russian artists
