= Alice Wingwall =

American photographer and sculptor

- Born: Alice Atkinson; September 5, 1935; Indianapolis, Indiana, U.S.
- Died: February 13, 2026 (aged 90); Sea Ranch, California, U.S.
- Education: Indiana University; University of California, Berkeley
- Occupations: Photographer, sculptor
- Spouse: Donlyn Lyndon (m. 1963)

Alice Wingwall (née Atkinson; September 5, 1935 – February 13, 2026) was an American photographer and sculptor. Diagnosed with retinitis pigmentosa as a young woman, she was legally blind for the last 26 years of her life.

== Early life and career ==
Wingwall was born Alice Atkinson in Indianapolis, Indiana on September 5, 1935, one of four children. She was raised in Zionsville. She studied at Indiana University and earned a Master of Fine Arts degree in sculpture from the University of California, Berkeley in 1963. Wingwall later taught at the University of Oregon and then became a professor and the director of the studio arts program at Wellesley College. She changed her surname to "Wingwall" in 1980, having been inspired by a street shrine on a Roman building with a stone cherub who seemed to be pulling the building forward despite having lost one of her wings. She additionally studied at the École du Louvre, the École nationale supérieure des arts appliqués et des métiers d'art, the Atelier del Debbio and, with a grant from the Danish government, the Royal Danish Academy of Fine Arts. She was a member of the Blind Photographers’ Guild alongside Pete Eckert and Bruce Hall.

In 1991, Wingwall created the outdoor fountain and sculpture Cascade Charley, which is currently installed on the University of Oregon campus in Eugene, Oregon. In 2000, she edited a short film, Miss Blindsight/The Wingwall Auditions, alongside Wendy Snyder MacNeil. The film won the Best Independent Film of the Year award at that year's New England Film and Video Festival. In 2015, Wingwall appeared alongside her husband in Erinnisse and Patryk Rebisz's documentary Shoulder the Lion.

Wingwall's work has been included in the California Museum of Photography's Sight Unseen exhibition and the Berkeley Art Museum and Pacific Film Archive's Blind at the Museum show. In 2005, her exhibit Portrait Selves was shown at UC Berkeley's Townsend Center for the Humanities. Wingwall's exhibit Beyond All That, created in collaboration with Suzan Friedland and Lis Gladstone, has additionally been shown at the Gualala Arts Center in Mendocino County, California.

== Personal life ==
Wingwall was married to architect Donlyn Lyndon in 1963; they had three children. She died on February 13, 2026.
