= Konstantin Kabanov =

Soviet Air Force colonel (1922-1979)

Konstantin Mikhailovich Kabanov
- Константин Михайлович Кабанов
- Born: 30 March 1922; Harinskoye village, Rybinsky Uyezd, Yaroslavl Governorate, Soviet Union
- Died: 13 April 1979 (aged 57); Moscow, Soviet Union
- Burial place: Khovanskoye Cemetery
- Military career
- Allegiance: Soviet Union
- Branch: Soviet Air Force
- Service years: 1940–1978
- Rank: Colonel
- Units: 593rd Attack Aviation Regiment, 332nd Assault Aviation Division
- Conflicts: World War II; Operation Bagration; East Pomeranian Offensive
- Awards: Hero of the Soviet Union; Order of Lenin; Order of the Red Banner (2×); Order of the Patriotic War, 1st class; Order of the Patriotic War, 2nd class; Order of the Red Star

Konstantin Mikhailovich Kabanov (Russian: Константин Михайлович Кабанов; 30 March 1922 – 13 April 1979) was a Soviet Air Force Colonel and Hero of the Soviet Union. After graduating from flying school in 1944, Kabanov was sent to the front and made 27 attacks on Danzig. He reportedly made a total of 103 attack sorties during the war flying Ilyushin Il-2 attack aircraft, for which he was awarded the title Hero of the Soviet Union. Postwar, Kabanov continued to serve in the Air Force and became a test pilot and later engineer at the Air Force Research Institute.

== Early life ==
Kabanov was born on 30 March 1922 in the village of Harinskoye in Yaroslavl Governorate to a peasant family. Kabanov graduated from seventh grade in 1936 and worked as a photographer. From 1937, he studied at the Rybinsk River College. In 1940, he was drafted into the Red Army and was sent to the Balashov Military Pilots Flying School.

== World War II ==
In 1944, Kabanov graduated from the Balashov Military Pilots Flying School. He also joined the Communist Party of the Soviet Union around this time. In June 1944, he was sent to the front and became an Il-2 pilot in the 332nd Assault Aviation Division's 593rd Attack Aviation Regiment. During the summer, Kabanov fought in Operation Bagration. On 25 July, he was awarded the Order of the Red Banner.

During the fall, he flew sorties during the Baltic Offensive. On 16 September 1944, he was awarded the Order of the Patriotic War 2nd class. In February 1945, he fought in the East Pomeranian Offensive. Kabanov reportedly led his flight of Il-2s in attack on Danzig in 27 sorties. On 30 March, he was awarded a second Order of the Red Banner. In April, he fought in the Berlin Offensive. Kabanov received the Order of the Patriotic War 1st class on 30 April. By the end of the war, he had reportedly made 103 sorties, destroyed 158 vehicles, 11 tanks, 6 artillery pieces, 27 anti-aircraft batteries, 9 warehouses, a railway train. Kabanov's sorties were reported to have killed a thousand German military personnel. On 18 August, Kabanov was awarded the title Hero of the Soviet Union and the Order of Lenin for his actions.

== Postwar ==
Postwar, Kabanov continued to serve in the Soviet Air Force. In 1953, he graduated from the Air Force Academy. He was a test pilot with the Air Force Research Institute for the next two years. Between 1955 and 1965 he was assistant chief engineer with the institute. Abanov retired in 1978 with the rank of Colonel. He lived in Moscow and died on 13 April 1979. He was buried in the Khovanskoye Cemetery.
