= Aleksei Ilyich Kravchenko =

Russian painter (1889–1940)

Aleksei Ilyich Kravchenko (1889, Pokrovskaya Sloboda [now Engels], Russia – 1940 Moscow, USSR) was a Soviet painter, illustrator, draughtsman and printmaker. Though Kravchenko first gained recognition as a romantic painter, he was best known during his lifetime as a book illustrator and graphic artist. His post-revolutionary paintings were only exhibited in 1974 at the State Tretyakov Gallery in Moscow. Works such as The Kiss (1929) and Indian Fairytale (c. 1926) confirmed him as one of the most dramatic romantic painters and boldest colorists of his generation.

== Education and early career ==
Kravchenko studied at Simon Holosy's art school in Munich (1903) and the Moscow School of Painting, Sculpture and Architecture (1904–5 and 1907–10) under Sergey Ivanov, Abram Arkhipov, Konstantin Korovin and Valentin Serov, graduating with distinction in 1910. He then traveled to Italy and Greece, researching large-scale painting and frescoes. His Italian and Russian landscapes received much public recognition and were exhibited by the Union of Russian Artists, the World of Art movement and the Moscow Artists' Fellowship in 1911. Several of Kravchenko's works of this period were purchased by for the Imperial collections at the Hermitage in St. Petersburg. On the proceeds of his 1911-12 sales, Kravchenko embarked on a voyage to India and Ceylon which formed the basis of some of his most memorable works. He returned to Moscow via Shanghai and Vladivostok. In 1914 in Saratov Kravchenko married Ksenia Stepanovna Tikhnonova, the only daughter of Stepan Grigoryevich Tikhonov, the proprietor of the Volzhsky Khlebny Bank (Volga Bread Bank). The couple lived in Moscow.

== Later career ==
At the outbreak of the First World War Kravchenko was commissioned as an official war artist and spent the winter of 1914-15 on the Galician Front. His sketches and photographs from the front were published in several Moscow illustrated magazines. In 1916 Kravchenko's daughter Natalia was born in Saratov. In 1918 Kravchenko's father-in-law Stepan Tikhonov was executed by the Cheka secret police and the family houses confiscated. Kravchenko, his wife and daughter remained in Saratov until 1921, where he worked as a stage designer, poster artist and designer of monumental propaganda stagings, after which he moved to Moscow and concentrated on book illustration and graphic art. He was a member of The Four Arts Society of Artists from 1925. He exhibited internationally in the 1920s with renowned artists such as Chagall, Malevich, Bakst, Dobuzhinsky, Kandinsky, Nina Niss-Goldman, Popova, Rodchenko, and others.

Today his work is represented in the State Tretyakov Gallery, Moscow, the Russian Museum, St. Petersburg, and the Saratov Picture Gallery, amongst other collections.

== Style ==
Kravchenko's graphic style can be described as Neo-romantic grotesque, impressive in its dynamics, intricate contrasts and spirited pictorialism. He was therefore most successful with illustrations of Romantic writers (e.g. Nikolay Gogol, E. T. A. Hoffmann, Victor Hugo and Stefan Zweig). He preferred wood-engraving, using which he created his most successful illustrations, for Gogol's Portret ('Portrait', 1929) and for Hoffmann's Meister Floh (1929), among others. In addition he used drawing, linocut and etching. Kravchenko also produced notable cycles of non-illustrative prints, for example the lyrical, intimate series Italy (mixed media, 1925–6) and Paris (mixed media, 1926; both in Moscow, State Tretyakov Gallery).

His painting is very different in tone and mood. Often lyrical, erotic and unabashedly sensual in its palette, Kravchenko's later works have a wild freedom born of the knowledge that they were an entirely private expression. He never exhibited his post-revolutionary paintings in his lifetime, fearing that he would be denounced for 'bourgeois formalism'. Kravchenko continued to paint throughout his career and became a professor at the Surikov Art Institute, Moscow.

== Exhibitions ==
- 1922 (Berlin) with Archipenko, Chagall, Filonov, Gabo, Lissitzky, Malevich, Puni (Pougny), Rozanova, Tatlin
- 1924 (New York) with Bakst, Dobuzhinsky, Chekhonin
- 1925 (Los Angeles) with Somov, Vasnetsov
- 1925 (Paris) with Kandinsky, Mayakovsky, Popova, Rodchenko, Stepanova

== Posthumous exhibitions ==
- 1974 (Moscow) State Tretyakov Gallery: Alexei Kravchenko, Retrospective
- 2007 (Moscow) State Academy of Fine Arts: Alexei Kravchenko and his Family
- 2008 (Moscow) Kurnikova Gallery, Barki: Alexey Kravchenko, Faces of Romanticism http://www.kournikovagallery.com/
- 2009 (Moscow) State Tretyakov Gallery: Alexei Kravchenko, 120th anniversary
- 2010 (London) Pushkin House: Alexei Kravchenko
