= Meer Akselrod =

Jewish Belarusian painter

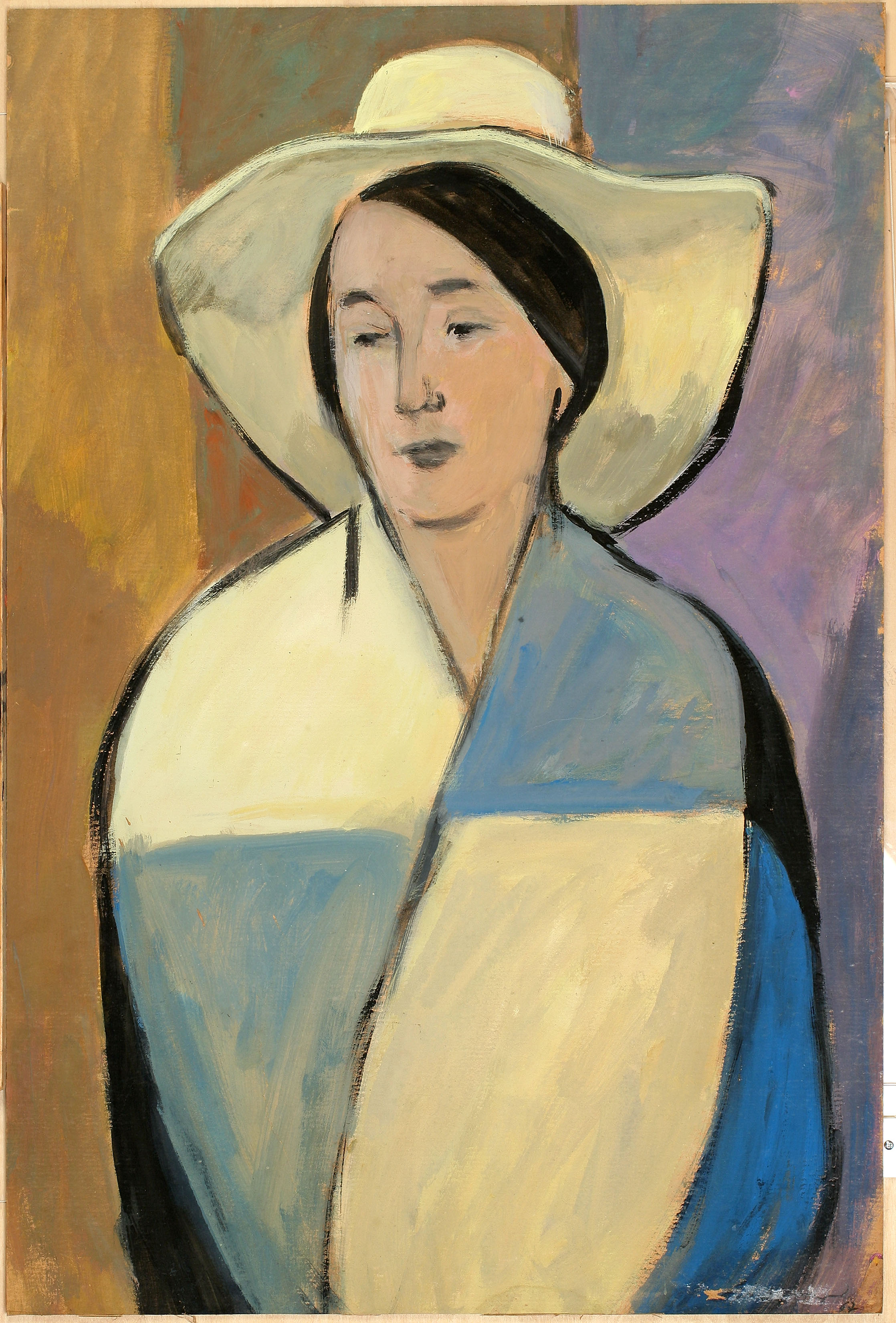
Painting by Meer Axelrod

Meer Moiseevich Akselrod, also Meyer Axelrod (1902–1970) (Russified form of the first name Mark) was a Belarusian painter best known for his watercolor paintings of Jewish life in the Russian Empire and the Soviet Union.

== Life ==
Akselrod was born in Maladzyechna, Russian Empire. As a child, he survived a pogrom and moved to Russia during World War I. At the outbreak of World War I, the family moved to Tambov after the Tsarist government evicted the Jewish population from the front line, where he attended an evening class at the drawing school of Perelman (1892-1967) in 1916-1917. In 1919 the family attempted to return to Molodechno, but the city had already become Polish, as a result the family settled in Minsk, where Akselrod earned a living as an advertising poster maker for cinemas and graduated from school. In the 1920s, he studied and then taught at the VKhUTEMAS School of Art. He was one of the members of the art association ‘The Four Arts’, which existed in Moscow and Leningrad in 1924-1931. In 1932 joined the Moscow Union of Artists. Amongst other things his work focused on Jewish life in the shtetl. At the Hebrew University of Jerusalem a work of his depicts a vibrant Shtetl market with a mix of residential homes, synagogues, and churches in a flat style, featuring various characters engaged in daily activities. The artist also portrayed figures such as a woman leans against a sack while a vendor weighs goods nearby, and a violinist stands next to two kneeling women, one holding a child.

In 1941, the Akselrod family was evacuated to Tambov, where it had been during the First World War. Meer Akselrod himself remained in Moscow, trying to find out about the fate of his arrested brother, the poet Zelik Akselrod, and waiting to be drafted into the army. Soon after mobilisation he was recalled by Sergei Eisenstein to work in the film crew of the film ‘Ivan the Terrible’ in Alma-Ata, on his way there he took his family from Tambov. He was in evacuation in Alma-Ata in 1941-1943, where he supported Jewish refugees from Poland. In 1944 in Alma-Ata, Akselrod's personal exhibition was held.

After the war he participated in a group exhibition in Moscow on Kuznetsky Most in 1966, where about 250 paintings were exhibited. After the exhibition he was immediately hospitalised because of his heart. In 1968 he had a personal exhibition in (Rostov-on-Don). Akselrod died of an unrecognised heart attack in 1970, having never seen the catalogue of the solo exhibition out of print. The artist is buried in the old, Jewish part of the Vostryakovsky cemetery.

His work was barely known outside the former Soviet Union until his daughter, Elena Akselrod, published her father's biography and a representative collection of his works in Israel in 1993.

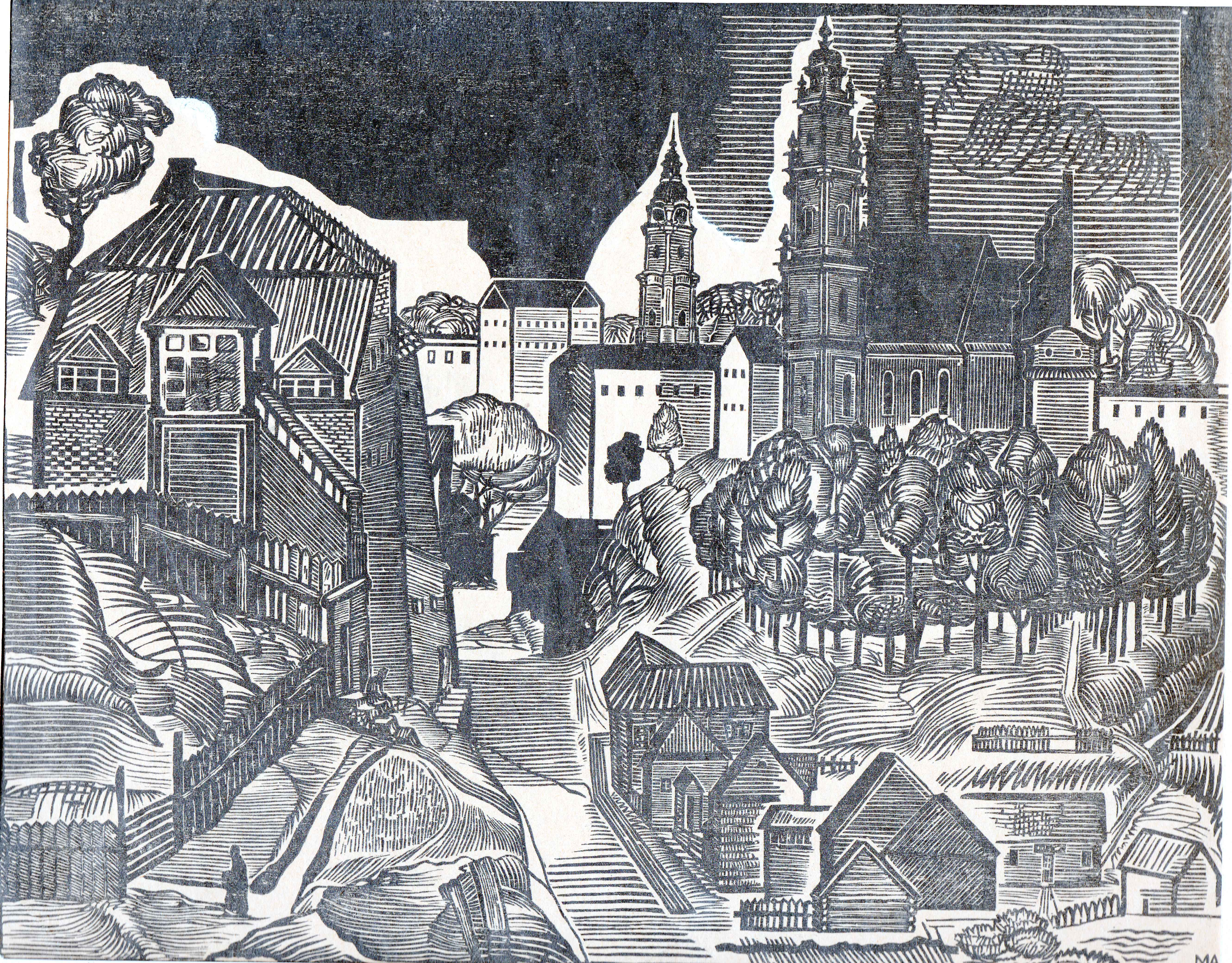
Minsk, 1923-24

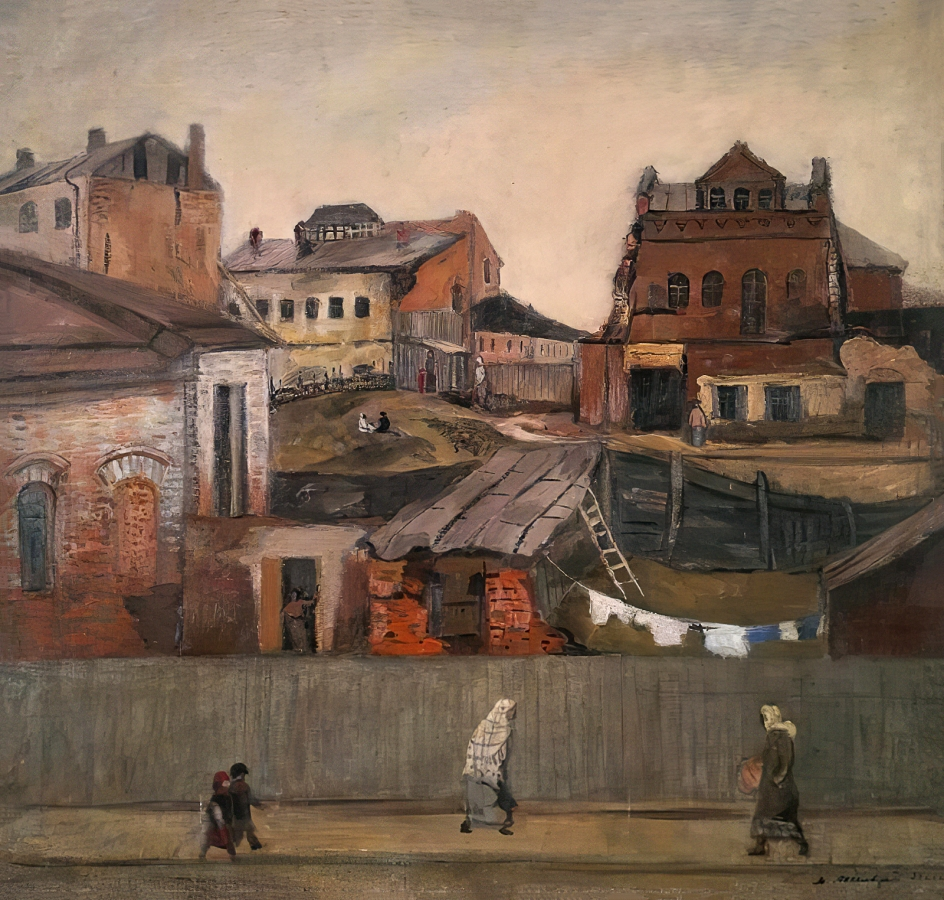
Minsk, 1934
