= The Four Arts =

- Founded: 1924; Moscow, Leningrad, USSR
- Type: Non-governmental organization
- Purpose: Modern art, live art, performance
- Location: Moscow, Leningrad
- Region served: USSR
- Method: social center, innovation

The Four Arts (in Russian: Четыре искусства) was an art association that existed in Moscow and Leningrad in 1924-1931. Was also known as the '4 Arts'.

== History ==
The society was founded by artists who had previously been members of the 'World of Art' and the 'Blue Rose'. The association included painters and graphic artists, sculptors and architects, as a rule, belonging to the older generation, so all members of the association were characterised by high professional skill, precisely worked out image structure and expressiveness, the ability to use the accumulated experience in application to new tasks set by modern art and urban planning. It existed in parallel with such organisations as the 'Association of Artists of Revolutionary Russia' (AKhRR) and the 'Society of Artists-Stankovists' (OST), but along with the 'Society of Moscow Artists' (OMH), the masters of the association with piety treated the problems of cultural preservation and preserved the language of the work, its artistic form - a very important part of the artistic work.

The artists were very different from each other in their creative style.

The Society often held exhibitions in Moscow (in 1925, 1926 and 1929) and in Leningrad in 1928. It joined the AKhRR in 1931.

Significant works: Petrov-Vodkin (After the Battle, 1923; Girl at the Window, 1928; Anxiety, 1935, Death of a Commissar, 1928), Kuznetsov (Construction of Yerevan, 1931; Sorting Cotton, 1931; Processing Tuff, 1931; Gathering Tea, 1928).

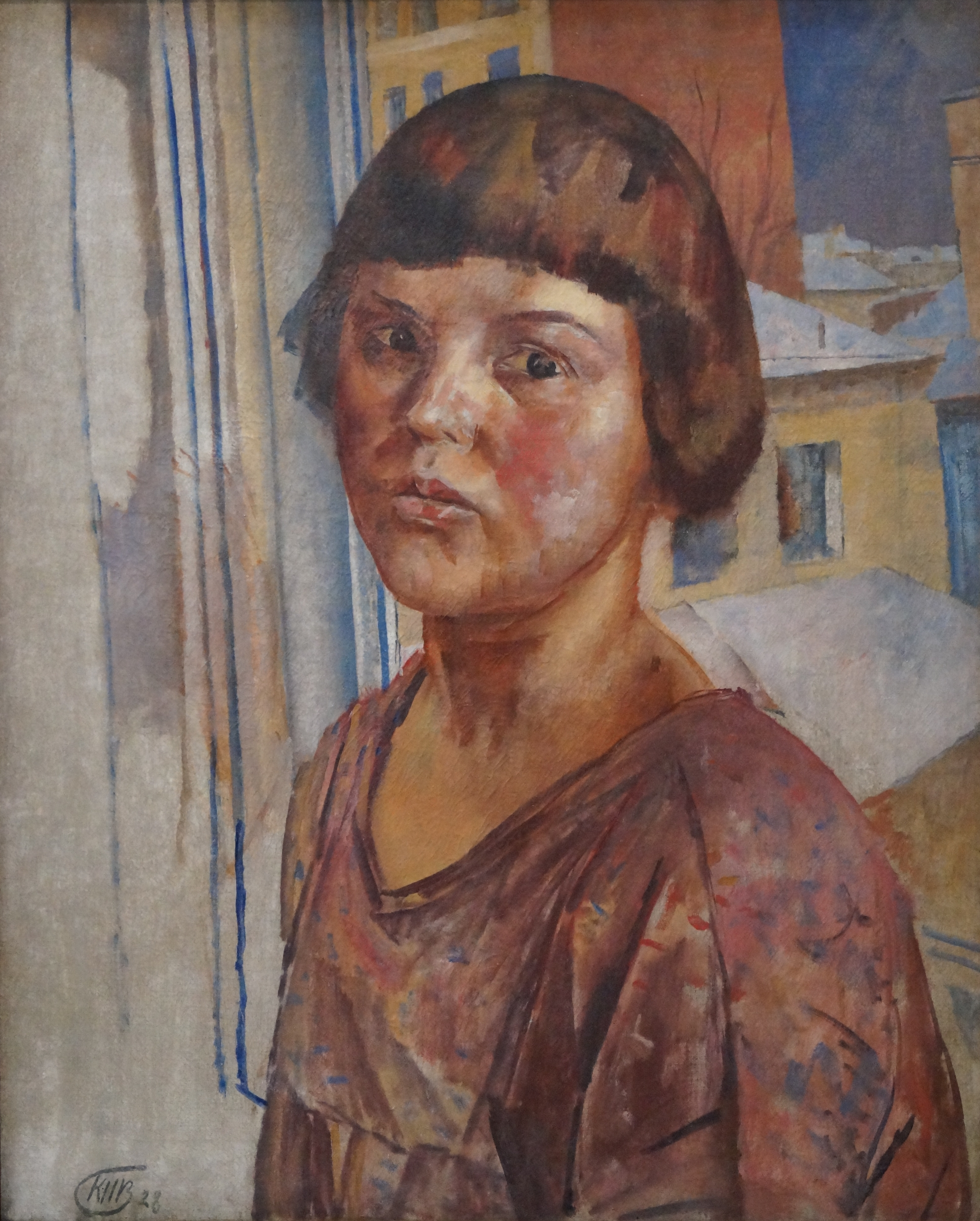
Portrait of Irina Mstislavsky (Petrov-Vodkin, 1928), oil on canvas, New Tretyakov Gallery, Moscow

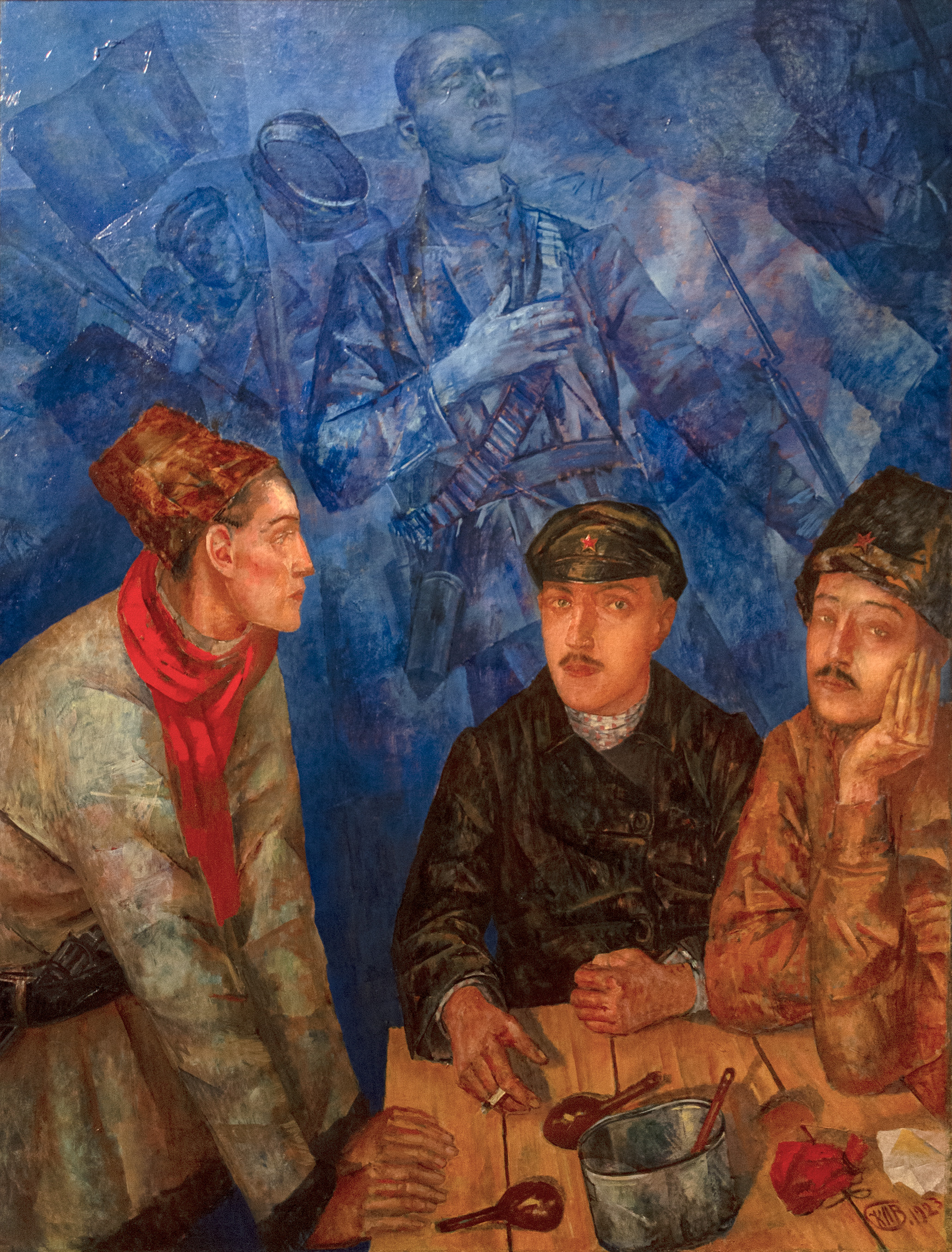
After the battle (Petrov-Vodkin, 1923)

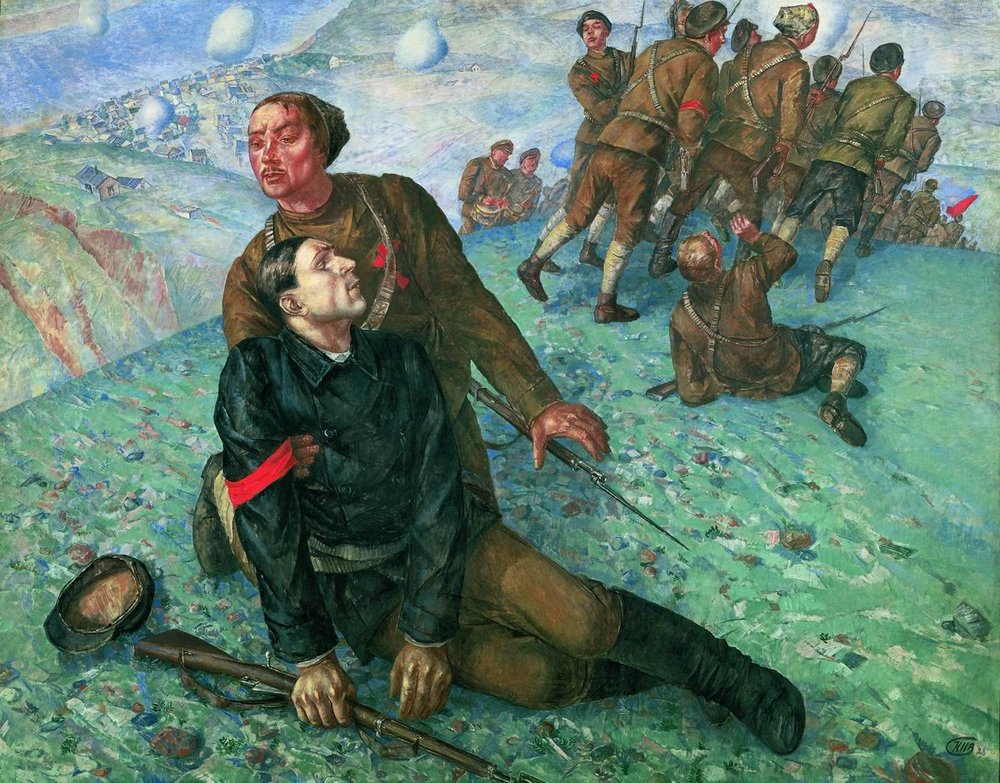
Death of a Commissar (Petrov-Vodkin, 1928)

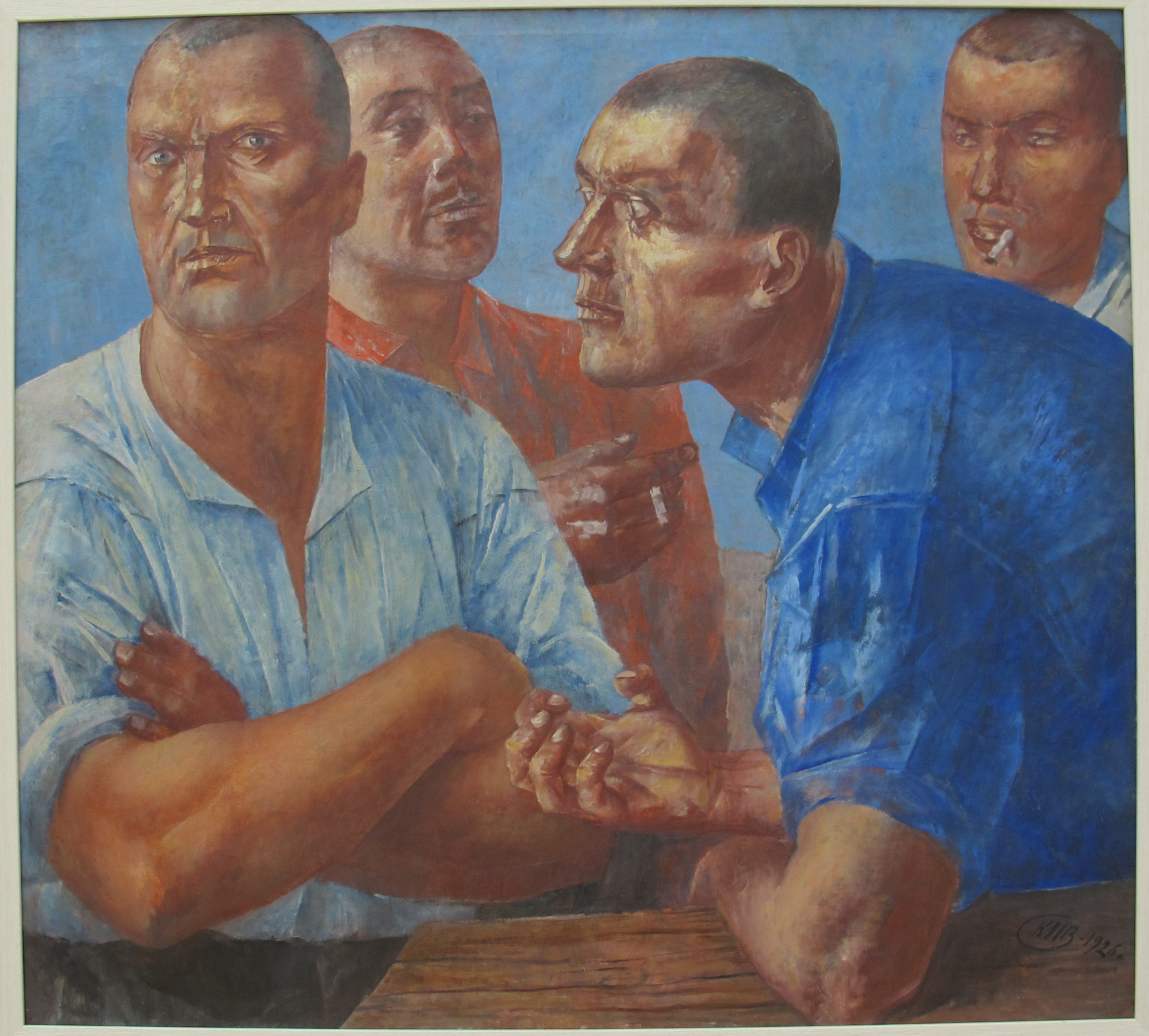
Workers (Petrov-Vodkin, 1926)

== Criticism from the left ==
In 1929, in the magazine Art to the Masses, D. Mirlas published a critical article that was essentially a political denunciation.

While in literature it is almost impossible for a writer or poet to hide his class face, in the visual arts... this face is masked in every possible way by various aesthetic fabrications. <...> Nowadays there are battles on the fronts of iso-art. The faces of friends and foes are more and more revealed. <...> ...Not perceiving the new life and unwilling to speak frankly about their true ideals, artists '4 Arts' are forced to limit themselves to either lyrical allusions or objectlessness. <...> It is very characteristic that even ... and in them (landscapes) they began to limit themselves to half-hints of a formal-aesthetic order, the meaning of which is accessible to very sophisticated amateur aesthetes. 'The Four Arts' society, having set as its motto the struggle for quality and a new style, within the limits of narrow shop-floorism and total disregard for the social and political attitude of the country of the Soviets, speculates on this, passing off its achievements as a universal quality and method. There is no quality that is extra-social and extra-class. What is suitable for artists who protect themselves from Soviet influences and who have been brewing for years among the nobility and landlord class and who preserve all the signs of the art of this decayed class is not suitable for the broader Soviet public, which is fighting against individualism in literature and art and its harmful influence on the younger generation of artists.

== Society members ==
- Meer Akselrod
- Basmanov, Pavel Ivanovich
- Bruni, Lev Alexandrovich
- Ivan Efimov
- Ivan Zholtovsky
- Istomin, Konstantin Nikolayevich
- Aleksei Kravchenko
- Pavel Kuznetsov
- Kupreyanov, Nikolai Nikolayevich
- Lapshin, Nikolai Fedorovich
- Vladimir Lebedev
- Alexander Matveev
- Mogilevsky, Alexander Pavlovich
- Vera Mukhina
- Nivinsky, Ignatiy Ignatyevich
- Nina Niss-Goldman
- Anna Ostroumova-Lebedeva
- Kuzma Petrov-Vodkin
- Martiros Saryan
- Nikolai Ulyanov
- Vladimir Favorsky
- Alexey Shchusev

== Literature ==
- 'The Four Arts' // A Concise Dictionary of Fine Arts Terms / Under the general editorship of G. G. Obukhov. - Moscow: Soviet Artist, 1961. - С. 183. - 190 с. - 15 000 copies.
- Severyukhin D. Ya., Leikind O. L. The Golden Age of Artistic Associations in Russia and the USSR (1820-1932). Reference book. - SPb.: Izd. Chernyshev, 1992. - 400 с. - ISBN 5-85555-004-4.
- Bebutova E., Kuznetsov P. Society '4 Arts' // Creativity. - 1966. - № 11.
- Great Russian Encyclopedia - article 'The Four Arts' (in Russian: Четыре искусства).
