= Valentin Galochkin =

Ukrainian sculptor

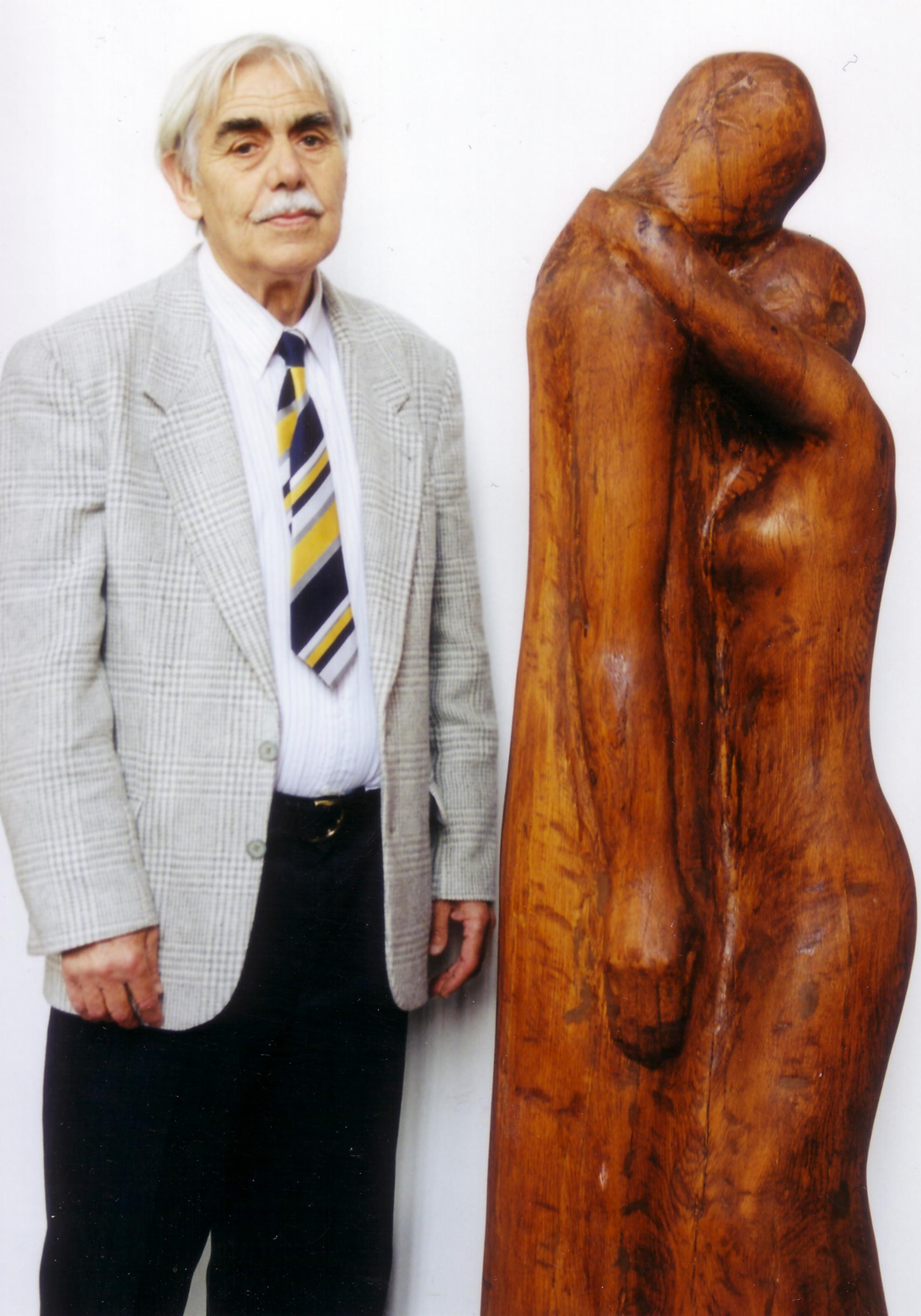
- sculptor
- Born: 22 November 1928; Dnipropetrovsk, Soviet Union
- Died: 3 November 2006 (aged 77); Moscow, Russia

Valentin Andreevich Galochkin (Russian: Валенти́н Андре́евич Га́лочкин) (November 22, 1928 – November 3, 2006) was a prominent Soviet (Ukrainian, Russian) sculptor.

== Biography ==
Galochkin was born in Dnipropetrovsk (USSR) on November 22, 1928. His father Andrey Andreevich Galochkin (Ukrainian, in the soviet passport: Russian) came from the Kaluga region and was a restaurant chef, later a modeler. Mother Golda Gorkhovna (in the soviet passport: Olga Grigorievna) Liberman (Jewish) came from the town of Chyhyryn (Ukraine) and worked as an accountant.

When World War II began in 1941 the family was evacuated to the Krasnodar region, then to Uzbekistan, returning in 1944 to Dnipropetrovsk. From 1944 till 1949 Valentin Galochkin attended an art school in Dnipropetrovsk and learned from Professor Zhiradkov. From 1949 till 1955 he studied sculpture at Kyiv Institute of Fine Arts. His favorite professor was Max Isaevich Gelmann.

Galochkin's graduation work "Steel smelter" (1956) was cast in bronze by the institute and sold to the USSR Ministry of Culture to exhibit in Lvov State Art Museum (Ukraine). Galochkin was appointed head artist of Kyiv sculpture works and remained at this post till 1959.

At the age of 29, Galochkin was nominated for the Lenin Prize for his work "Hiroshima" (1957), however the prize went to 83-year-old Sergey Konenkov.

In 1968, Valentin Galochkin won a prize in a Festival of young artists in Vienna. In 1960s and 1970s he visited the UK, France, Egypt and Greece. He was impressed by the Louvre in Paris. As he later recalled, he had so long waited to see this "temple of art" that right at the entrance, after having seen the statue of Nike of Samothrace, he couldn't help crying and for two hours didn't dare to enter the museum.

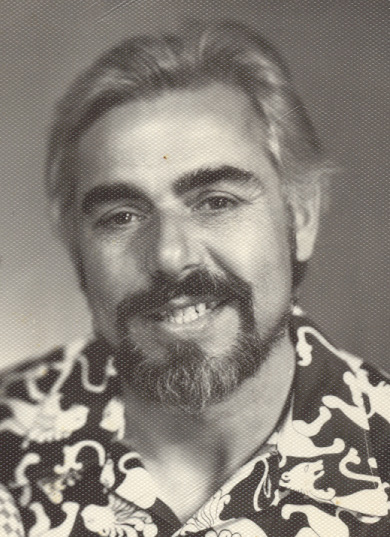
Valentin Galochkin in 1980

Valentin Galochkin was married three times. The first marriage in (1958) was to Yulia Ukader (Soviet, Ukrainian sculptor). A daughter from the first marriage is Tatiana Galochkina (painter). The second marriage in (1978) was to Alena Bokshitskaya (film expert). A daughter from the second marriage is Anna Bokshitskaya (journalist). The third marriage in (1980) was to Lidia Galochkina, born Abramenko (Russian sculptor, graphic artist). Sons from the third marriage are Igor Galochkin (game developer) and Andre Galkin (programmer). Valentin Galochkin was a sportsman, a Master of Sports in swimming and volleyball, hunter and fisherman.

In 1986, after the Chernobyl disaster, the sculptor moved with his family from Kyiv to Moscow. In 1999 he emigrated to Wismar in Germany, and in 2002 moved to Hamburg. He died from a heart attack on 3 November 2006 on a trip to Russia, in Moscow. He was buried in Nakhabino cemetery on November 8, 2006.

== Artistic style ==
His early works, including the graduation work "Steel smelter" (1956) follow the standards of soviet realism set up by Vera Mukhina, Ivan Shadr, Sergey Merkurov.

The first significant work "Hiroshima" (1957) which made Galochkin well known in the USSR is devoted to the victims of atomic bombing of Hiroshima in World War II. "Hiroshima" expresses the sculptor's protest against nuclear weapons, a call for humanness.

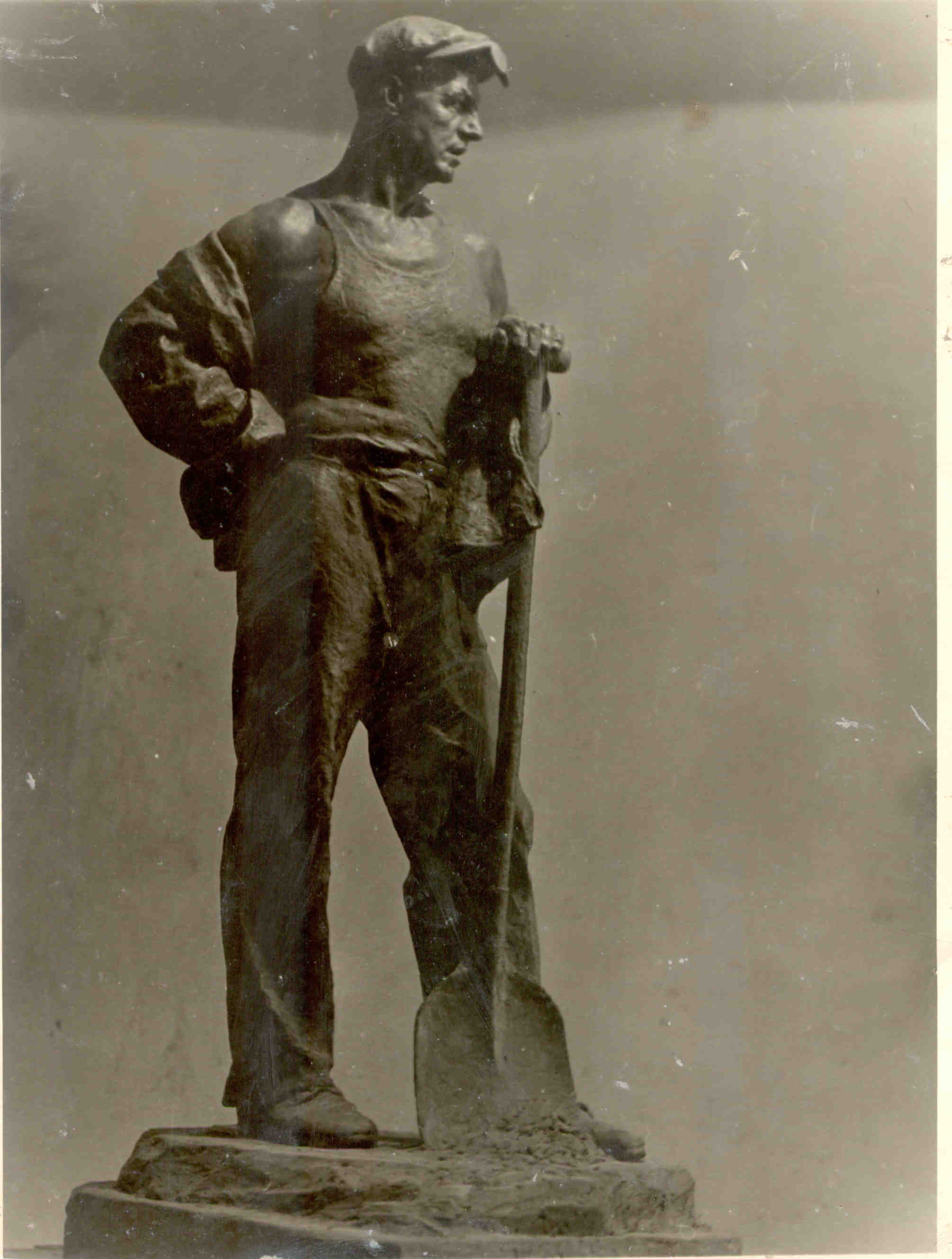
"Steel-smelter", 1956

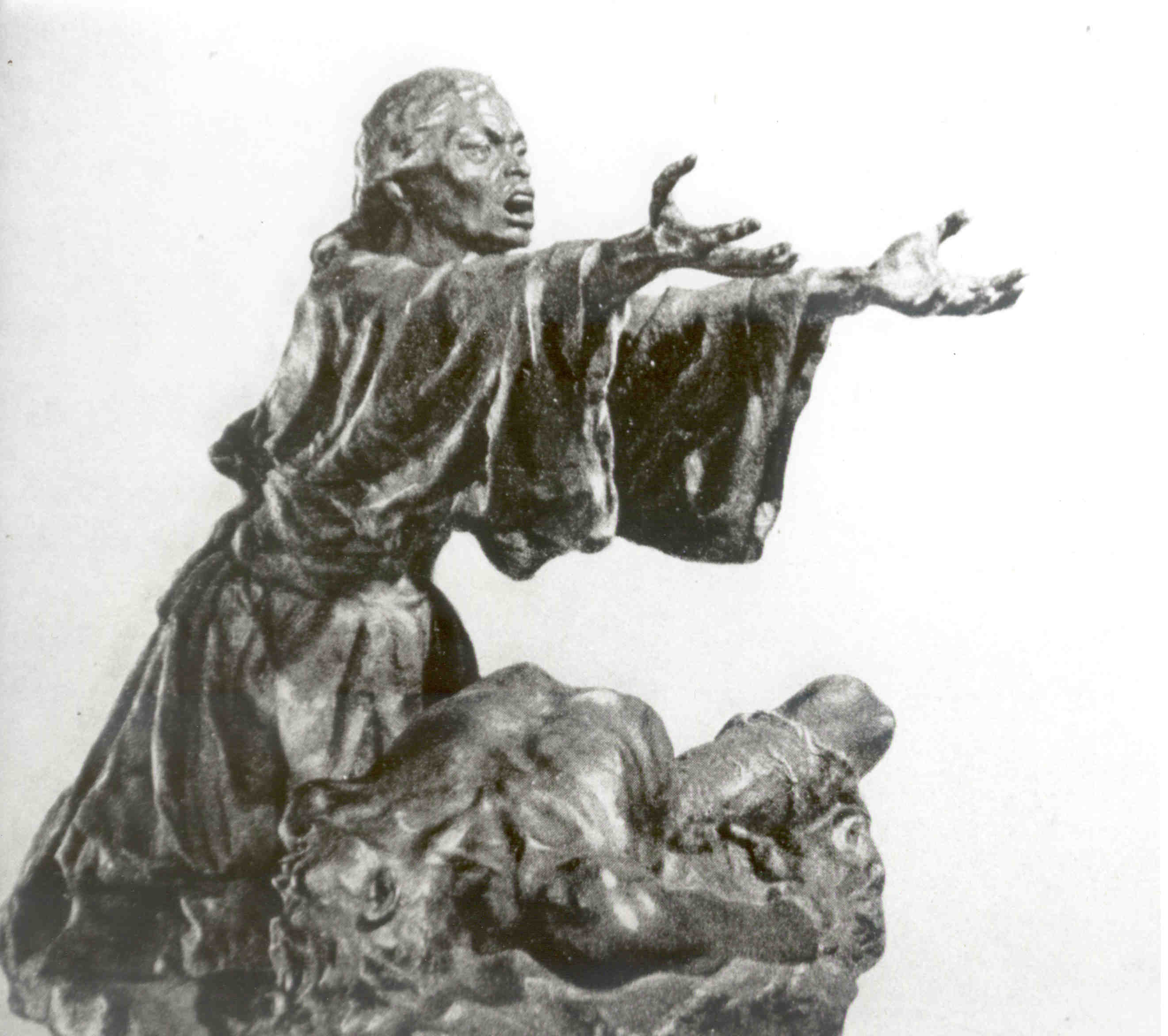
"Hiroshima", 1957

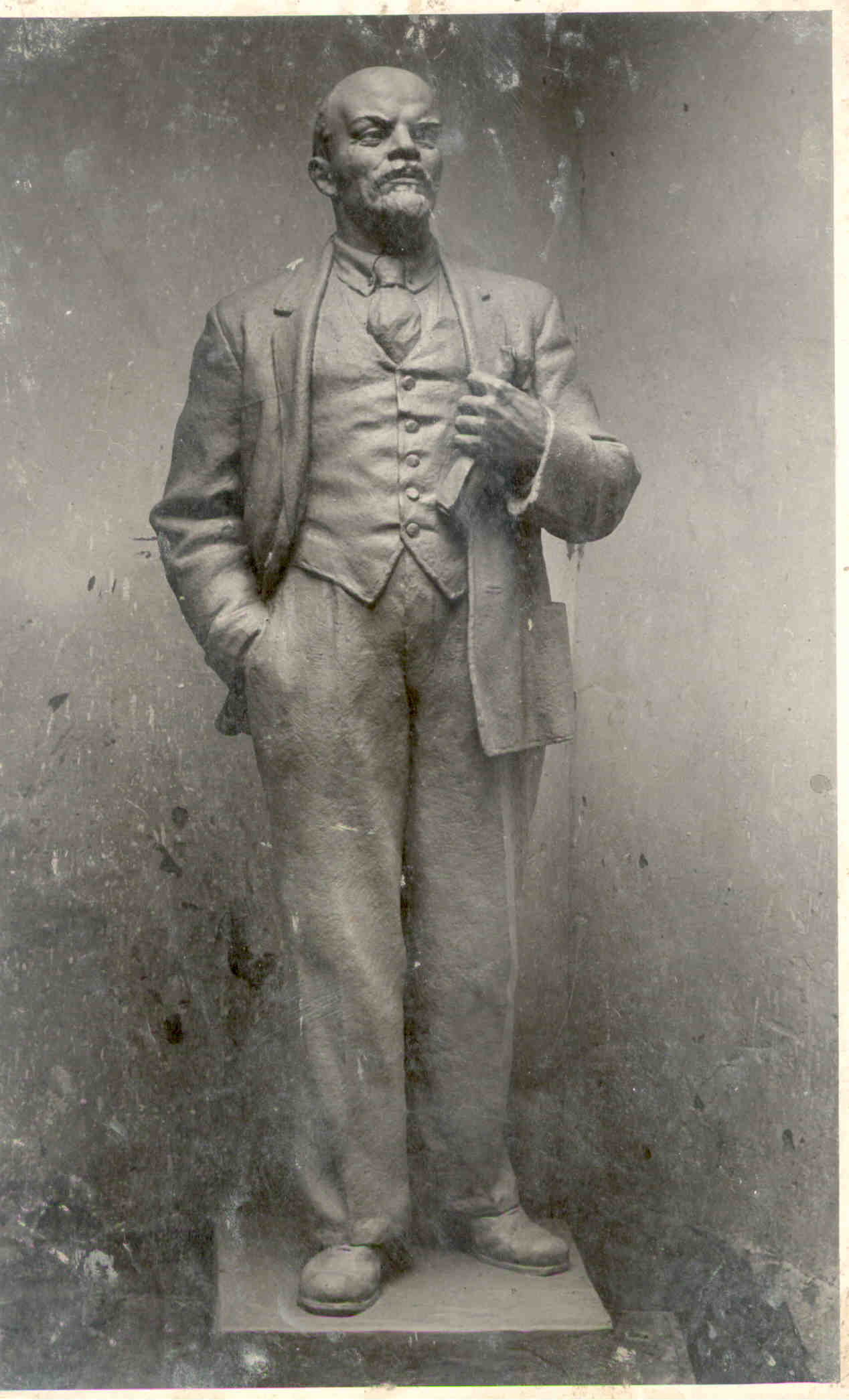
"V. I. Lenin", 1960

From 1957 till 1991 Galochkin produced dozens of state-ordered parade monuments and busts to Vladimir Lenin and other soviet leaders. However the sculptor never treated these works as art. Already as a young artist he became disillusioned with the principles of soviet realism. He studied European and American art, especially Henry Moore, Ossip Zadkine, Amedeo Modigliani.

A series of monuments by Galochkin is devoted to World War II. His view of war is however very far from that of the soviet propaganda. Having survived the war as a child, he portrays the suffering of common people instead of youthfully marching soldiers or triumphant military leaders.

His work "Leaving for the front" 1957, carved from one piece of wood, shows the last passionate kiss of a soldier leaving his wife. In memorial "Victim" 1964 a shape of a human appears as a breach in solid stone, as if formed by an exploding shell. The disappeared human being has left a trace, a silhouette in the air. The memorial to the victims of Babi Yar (working title "Violence") 1964 - a pregnant woman, cut in half is a terrible symbol for the mass executions of Jews. Monument "Widows" 1975 depicts an old and a young woman (mother and wife) eternally holding the soldier's helmet. In the work "Gate of sorrow" 1976 two "women are mourning over a heavy loss, like atlantes". "Memorial to the burnt village" 1979 - a girl standing in the flame.

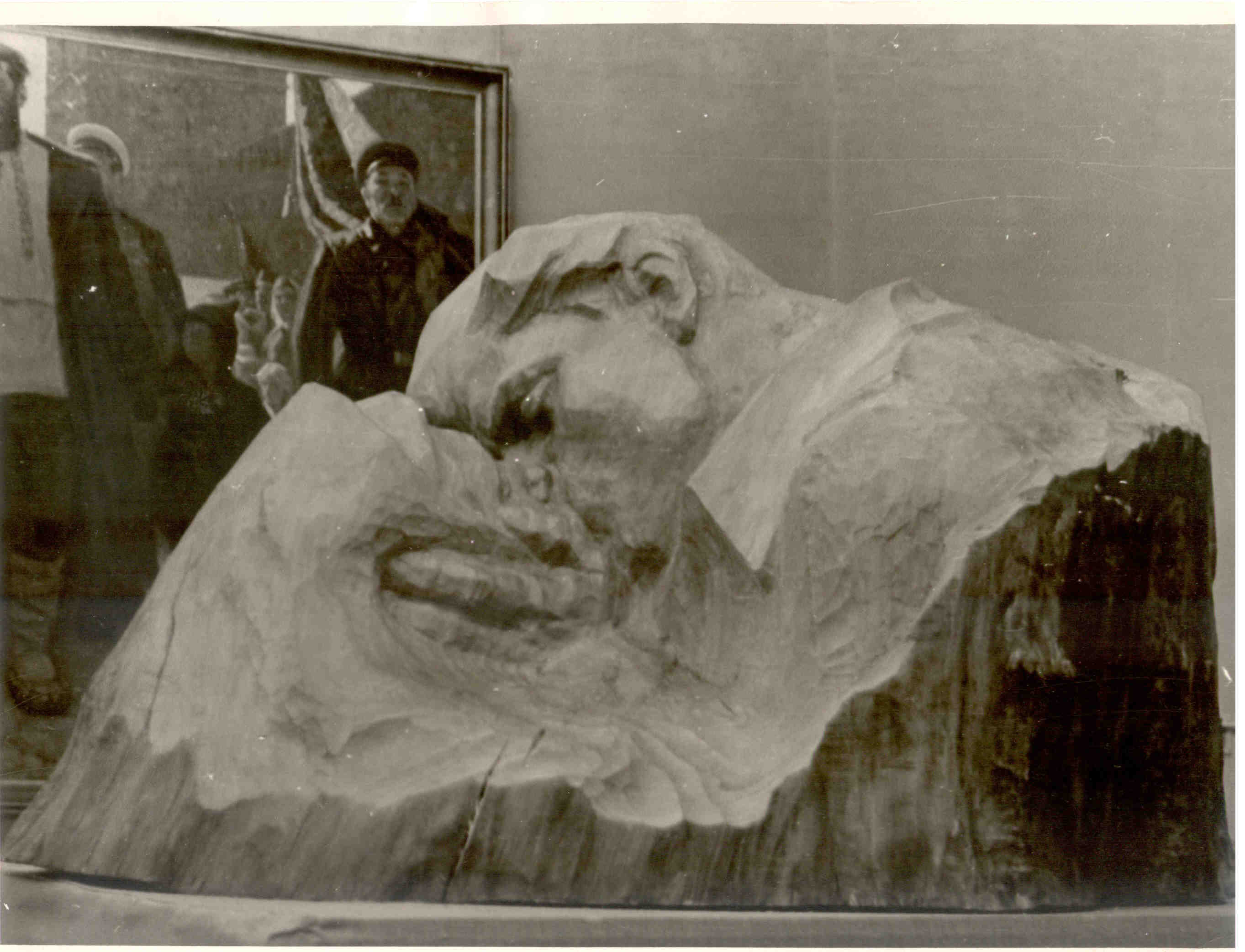
"Leaving for the front", 1957

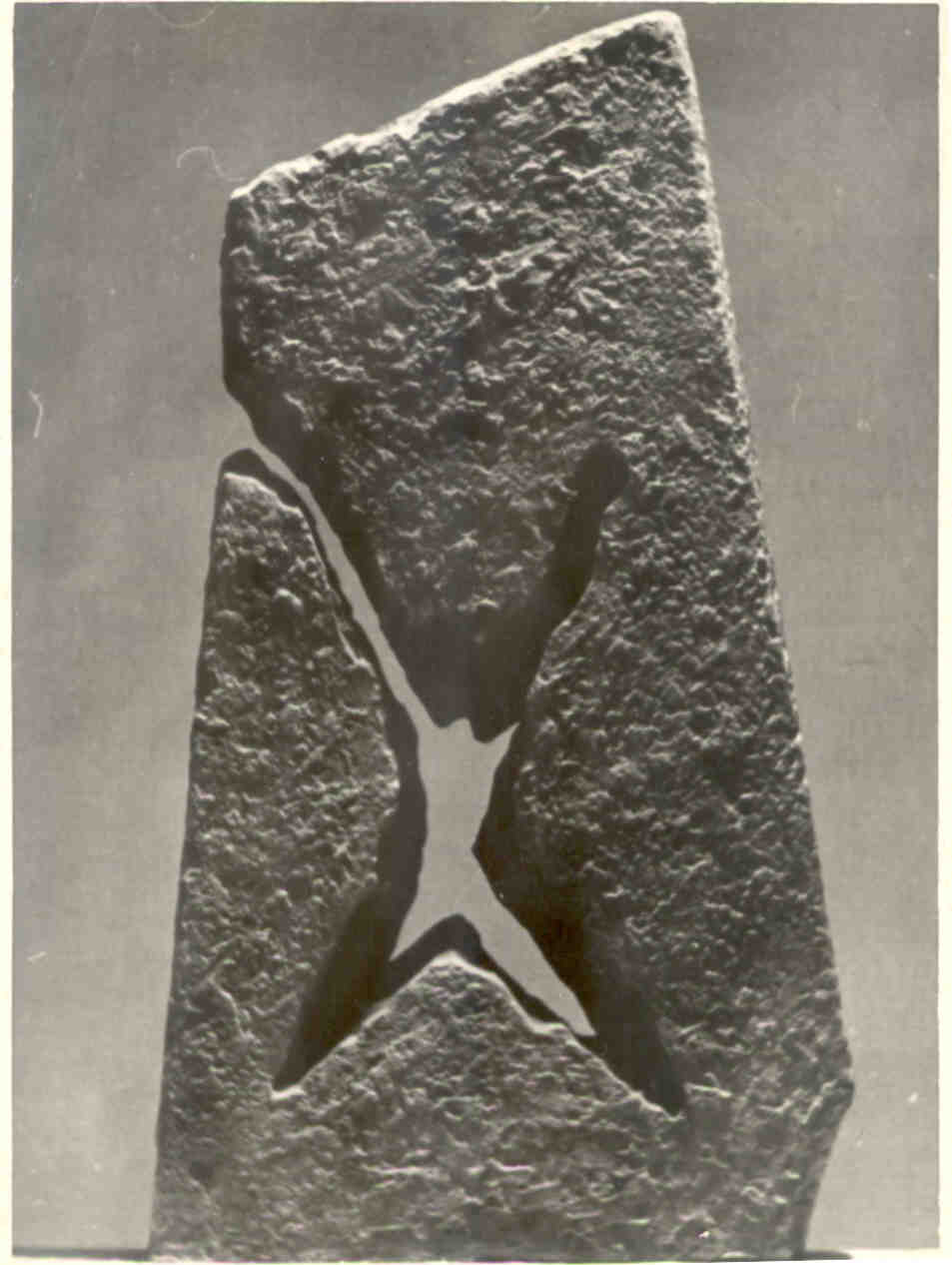
"Victim", 1964

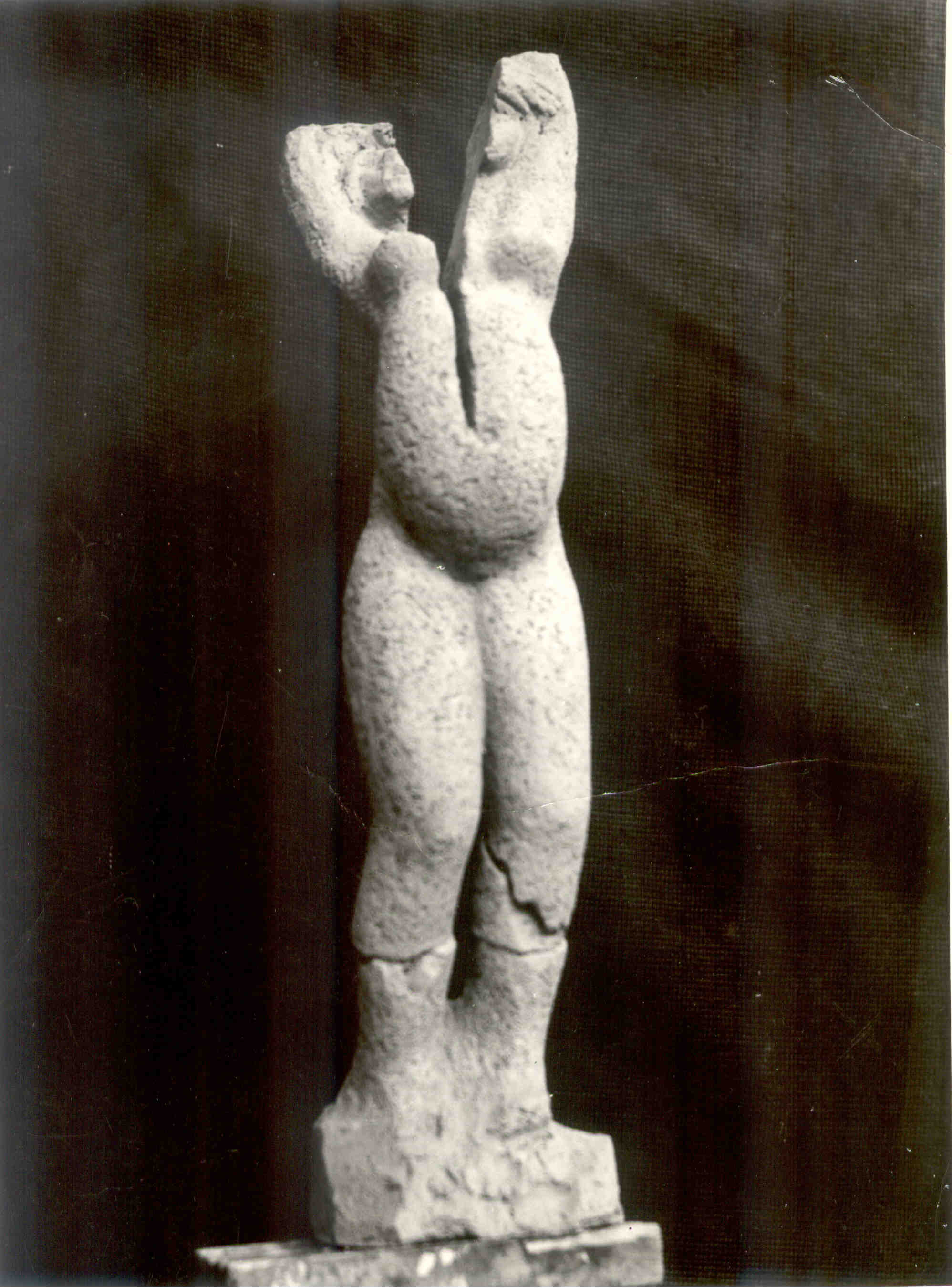
"Babi Yar", 1964
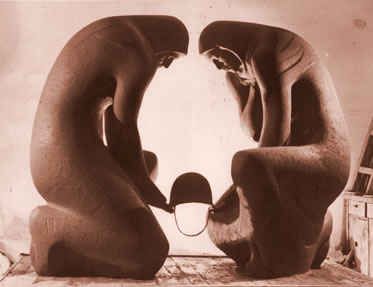
"Widows", 1975

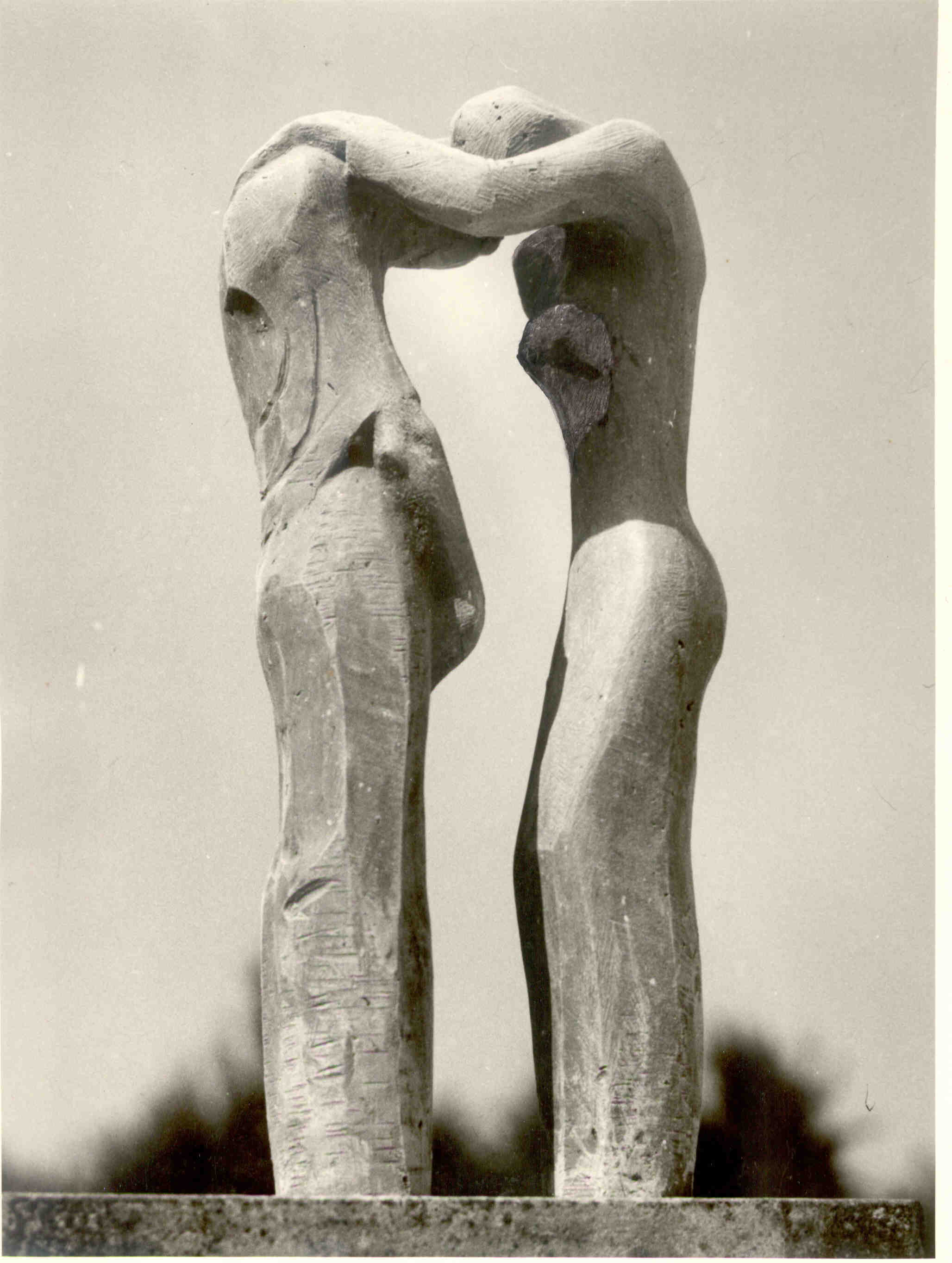
"Gate of sorrow", 1976

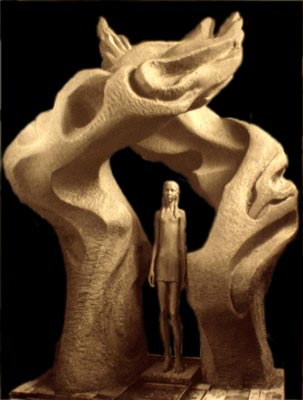
"Memorial to the burnt village", 1976

A common theme of Galochkin's indoor sculpture is the figure of a woman and female torso. The majority of his anatomical studies and realistic depictions of the female form have not been preserved. Over time, his approach to the nude transitioned from a realist aesthetic toward an increasingly symbolic representation. In works "Queen" 1965, "River" 1970, "Cellist" 1975 the figure of a woman is stylized, converted into a play of silhouettes, volumes, and "shapes of air". Valentin Galochkin develops his own concept of sculpture as a multitude of silhouettes, which are built by the air surrounding the sculpture. From different angles of view the same sculpture makes a different silhouette.

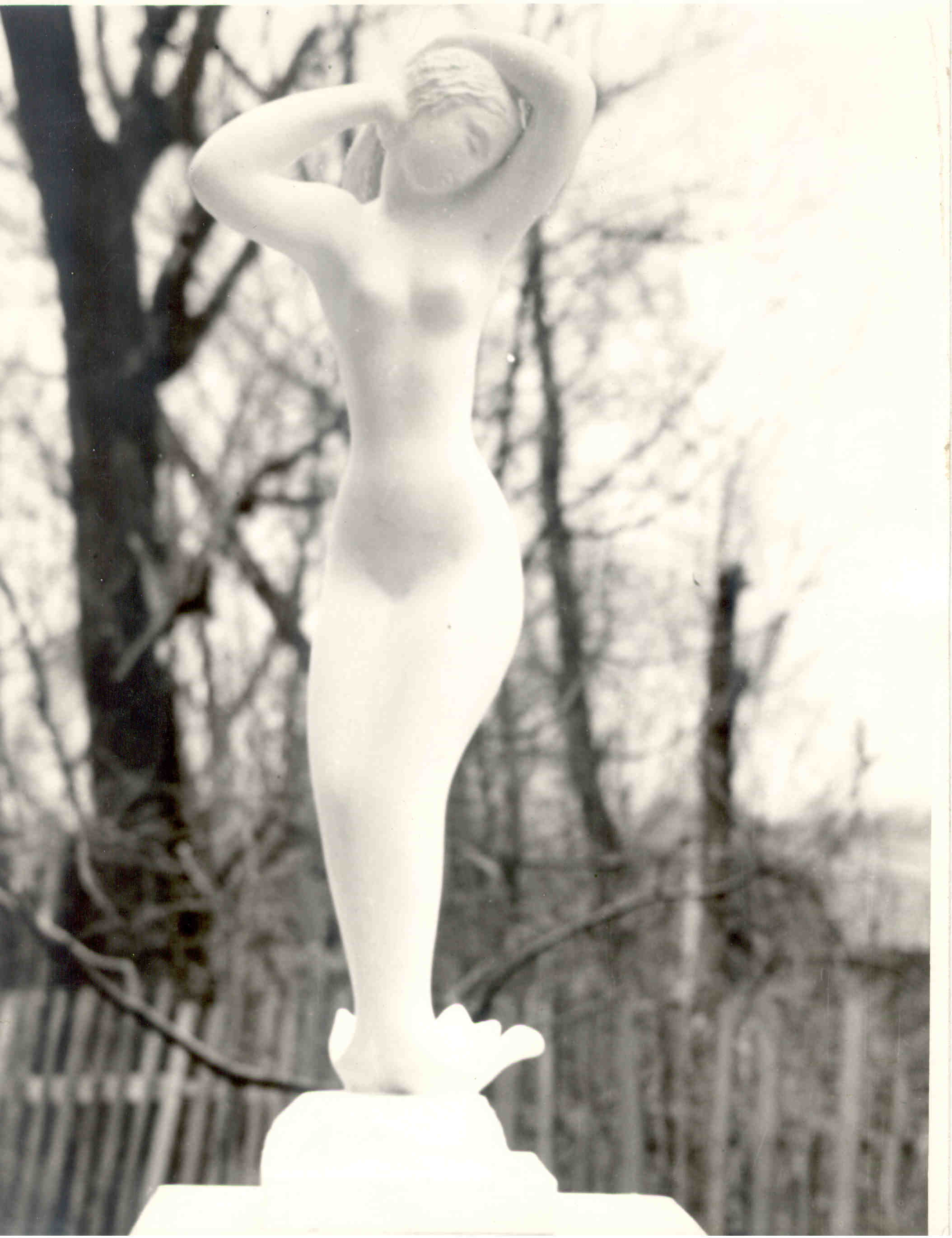
"Mermaid", 1975

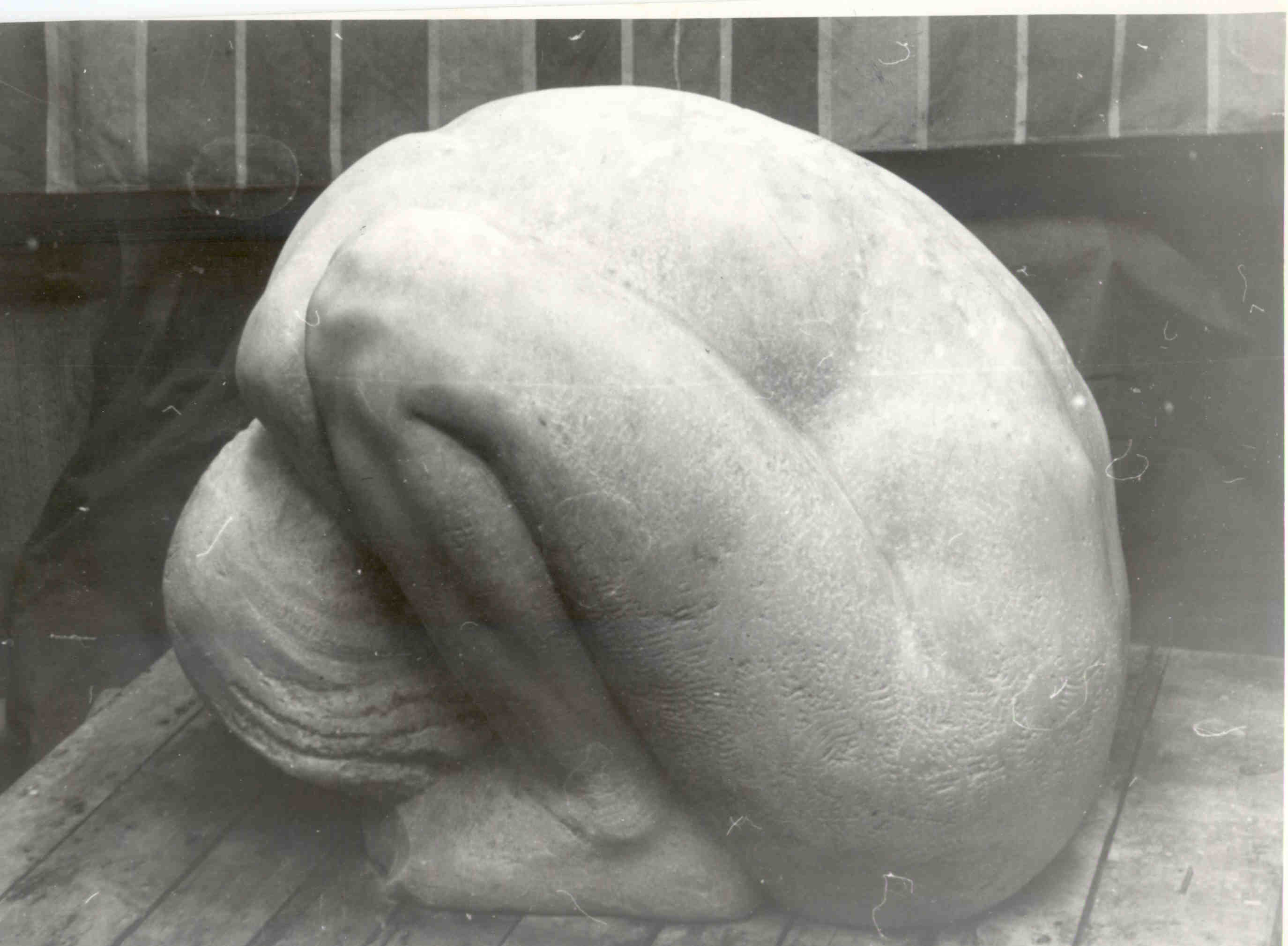
Study ("Slavery"), 1965

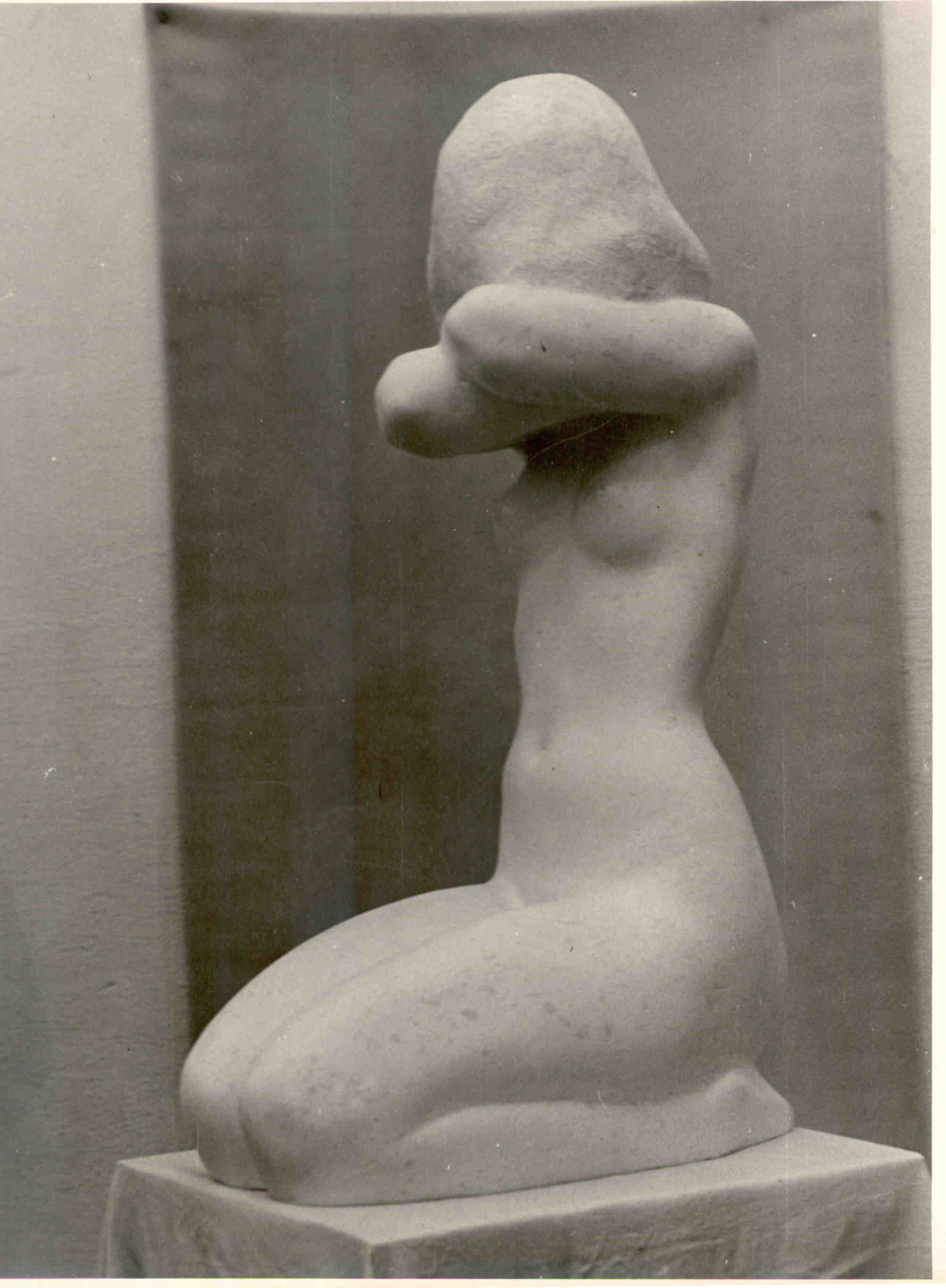
Study ("Spring"), 1975
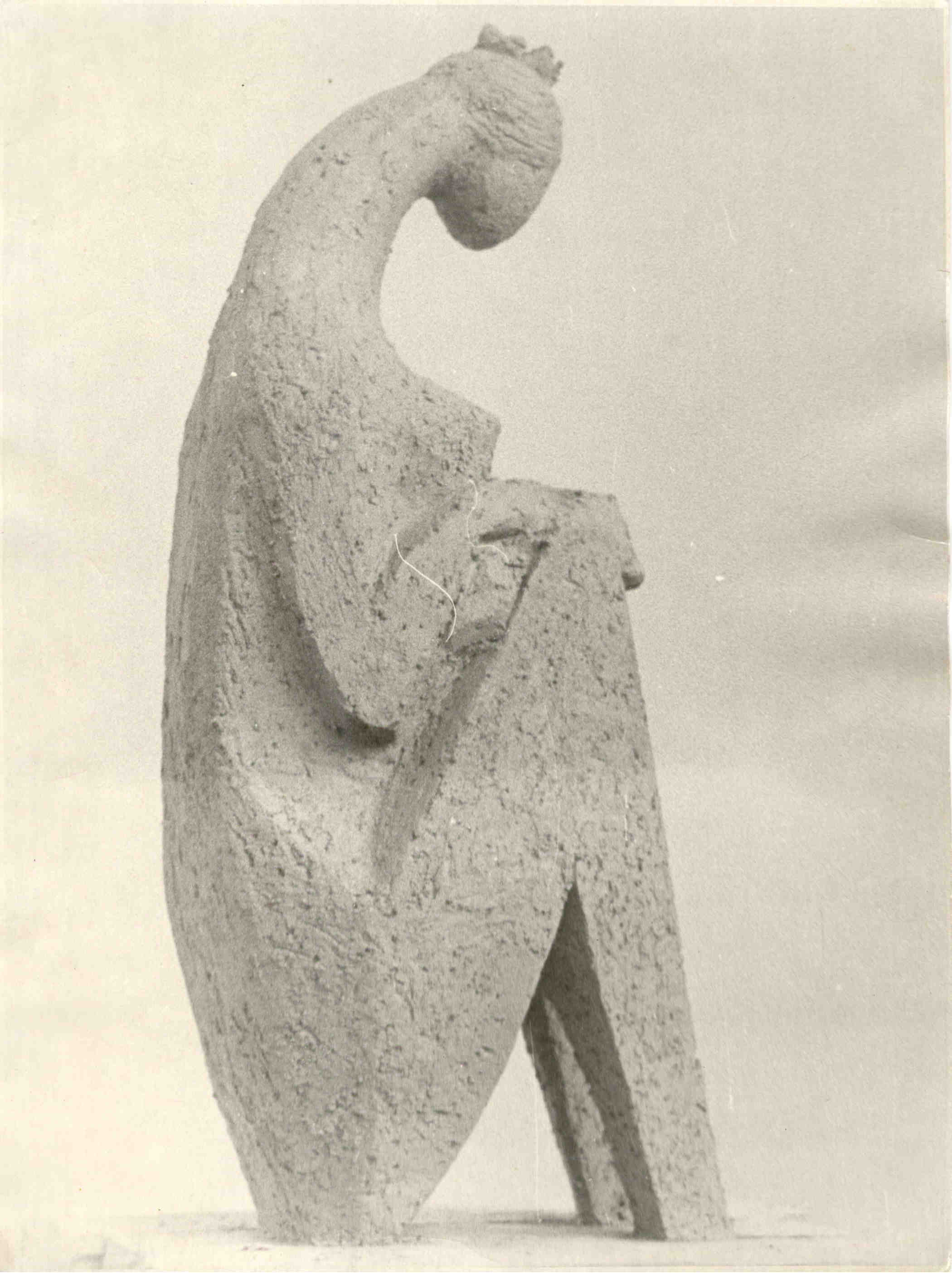
"Queen", 1965

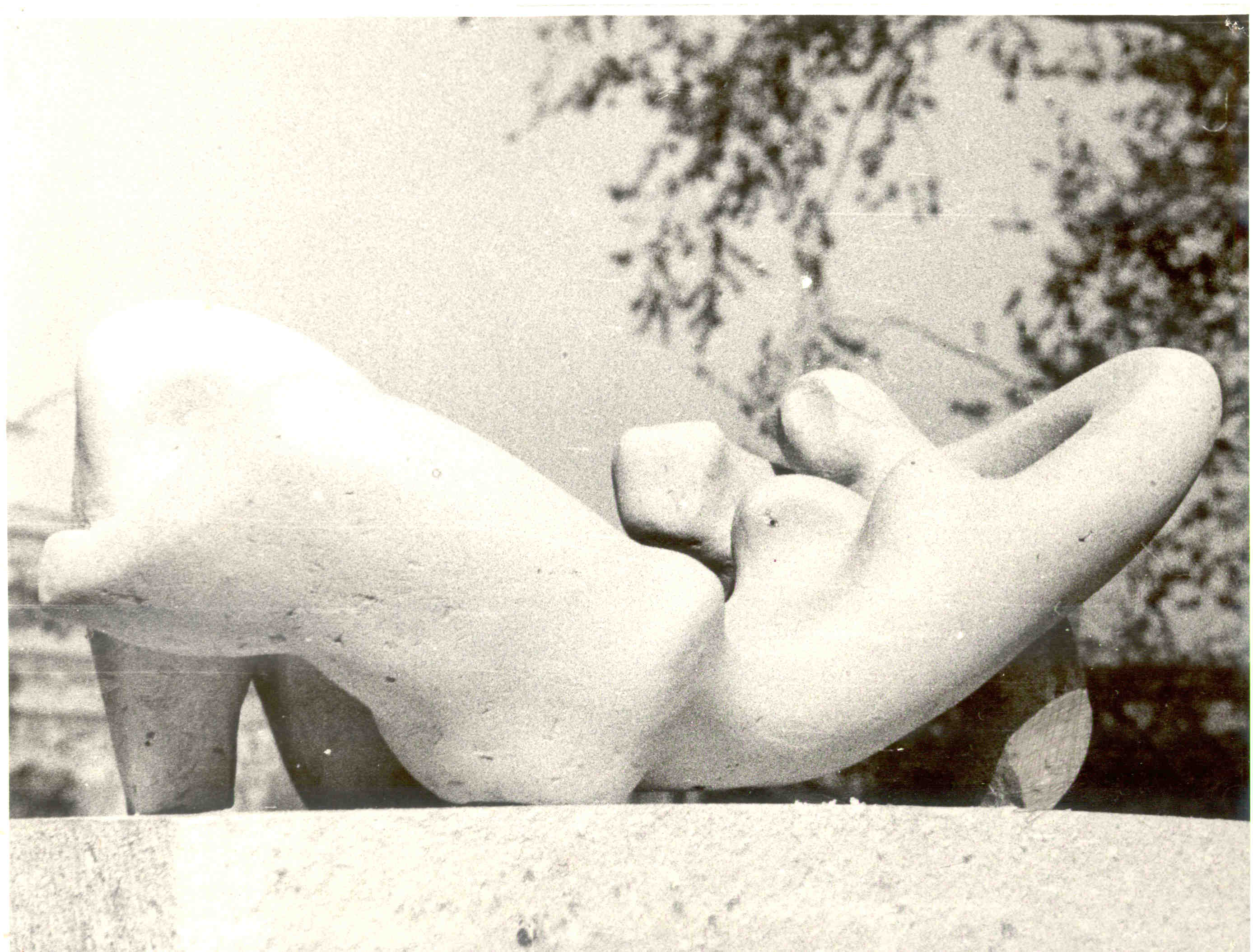
"River", 1970

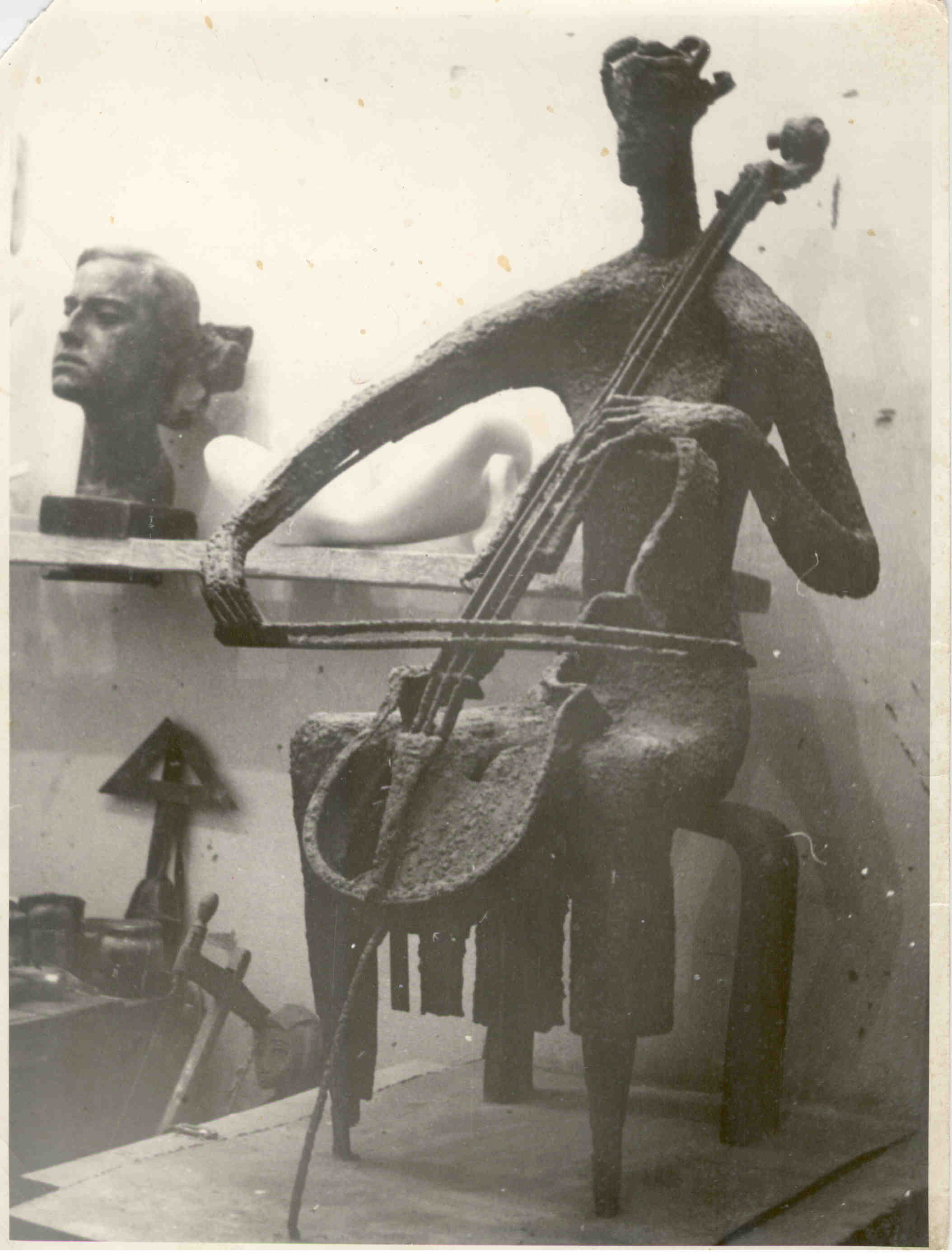
"Cellist", 1975

A special place in Galochkin's works belongs to the geometrical form of ellipse in which he sees the basis of composition and "the drive to harmony". His "Torsos" of 1969 and 1975 convert female torsos into ellipse-reminding, strained and balanced shapes.

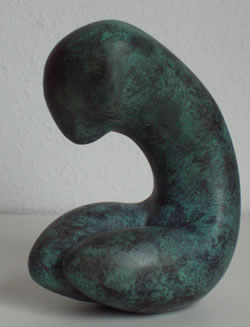
"Bounded torso", 1969

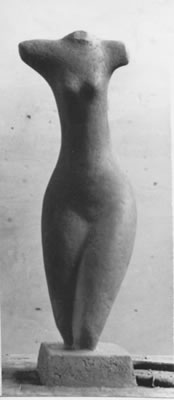
"Torso", 1975

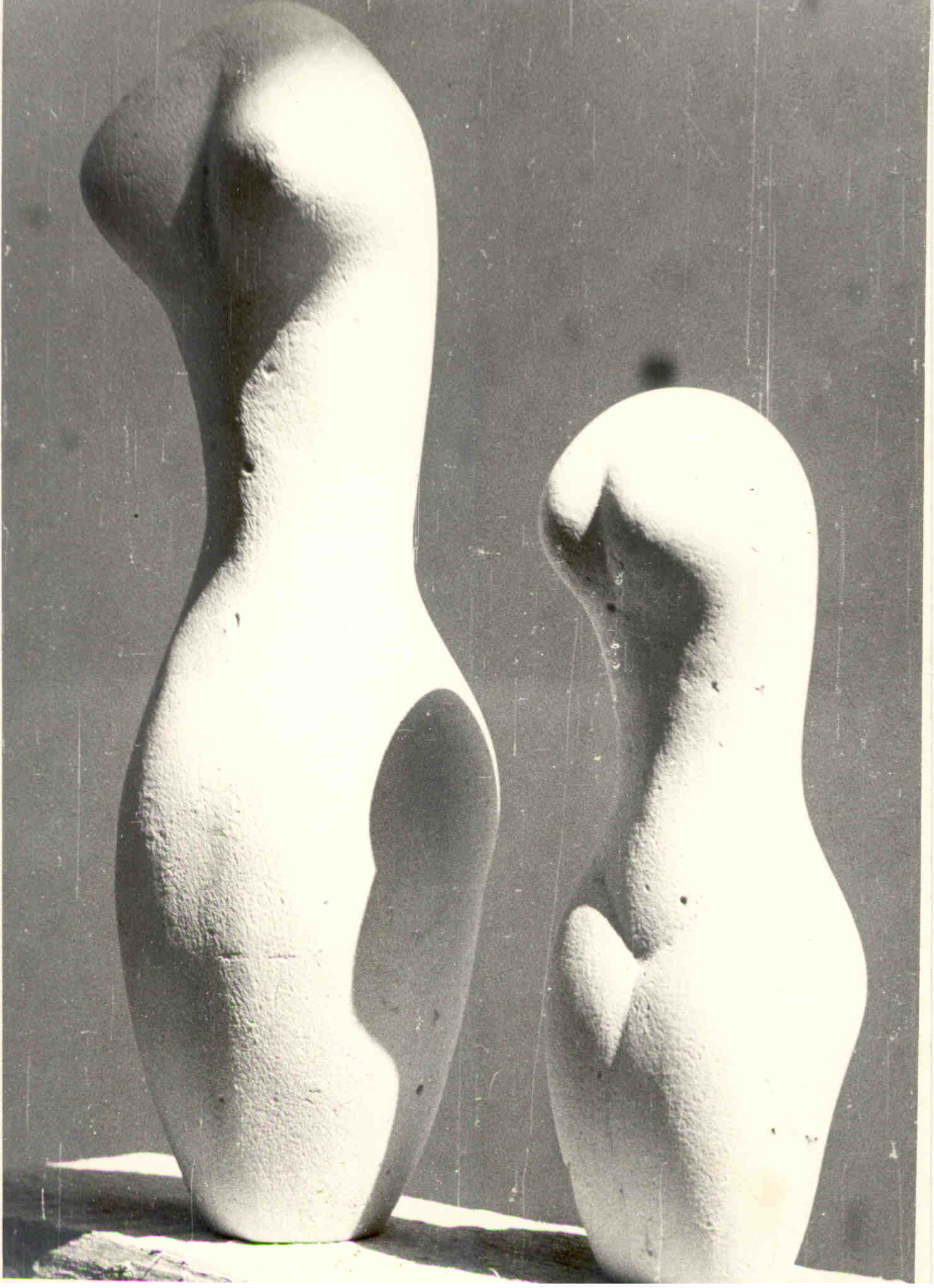
"Torsos", 1975

== Citations (from working notes) ==
Even beautiful but designed and therefore annoying rhythms and silhouettes are also lies, a make-up, so empty and distant.

Only the passionless can have a quality of the eternal.

If there is an objective concept of "beauty" and if beautiful, in this case, should remain forever beautiful, one should create in accordance with the laws of the universe.

Not precocity makes a work of art timeless and great, but its naked, sincere truth and purity, so simple as the earth itself, faceup opened to people.

What does this beauty of a thing consist of? Perhaps, first of all, of harmony and inner rhythm and cohesion, rationality and hidden appropriateness.

For your inner world to become valuable to others, not to yourself only, it must be humane.

In a piece of art there must be a mystery.

== Bibliography ==
- Galochkina L. Valentin Galochkin. 2018, Viaprinto, München. ISBN 978-3-00-059 305-5 online online2
- Галочкина Л. Н. Валентин Галочкин: жизнь и работа скульптора. Из рабочих записей Валентина Галочкина. 2010, Москва, Анкил, 336 с. с илл., ISBN 9785864763049.
- Объединение московских скульпторов 1992-2007. Каталог произведений московских скульпторов к 15-летию ОМС, изд.МСХ, Москва, 67 стр. с илл., 2007. C. 14
- Андрієвська В. Л., Беличко Ю. В. На межі 2-3 тисячоліття. Художники Києва. Iз древа життя Українського, образотворче мистецтво. 2009, Києв, Криниця. 523 с.
- Galochkina L. Valentin Galochkin. 2 Volumen. 2007, Hamburg, Fotobuch.de, 653353-H96C13G
- Вольценбург О. Э. Советский биографический словарь. под. ред. Гориной Т. Н. Москва, Искусство, 1972. С. 399.
- Опыт как реальность. Конечна Р. Новости МСХ, 2010 (No.11)
- Tomsky about "Hiroshima" 1957 in Томский Н. В., Шевцов И. М. Прекрасное и народ: сборник статей. Москва, Из-во Академии художеств СССР, 1961. С. 144.
