= Alexei Karev =

Russian painter

Alexei Eremeevich Karev (1879, Shilovka – 1942, Leningrad) was a Russian painter and graphic artist.

Karev studied icon-painting studio under Fyodor Korneyev in Saratov in 1896 and then until 1898 he attended the Alexei Bogolyubov School of Drawing there, before moving to Penza where he studied under Konstantin Savitsky at the Nikolai Seliverstov School of Art. In 1901 he moved to Kiev where he studied for two years at the Kiev Private School of Art. In 1903 he then moved to St Petersburg and attended the Free Studio of Art.

He was influenced by the French Symbolists and Post-Impressionists. He is noted for his cityscapes of Petrograd/Leningrad from the late 1910s to the 1930s.

He became a member of the Mir Iskusstva (World of Art group) in 1917 and in 1918 was appointed Commissar of the Petrograd State Free Art Studios. He was also appointed to the board of worked for IZO-Narkompros (1918–19).

Alongside Nathan Altman and Aleksandr Matveyev he was on the Commission of the Museum of Artistic Culture which in December 1918 set out to draw up a list of 143 painters whose work they wished to acquire for the museum. The list was published in Iskusstvo kommuny, and the museum was opened on 3 April 1921.

He was responsible for transforming the existing schools of art into Svomas, state free art studios, in Penza (1919) and Saratov (1920–21) (where he also taught), and the Central School of Technical Drawing (1921–22).

From 1922 until 1941 he taught at Vkhutein (Institute of Painting, Sculpture and Architecture of the All-Russian Academy of Arts), being appointed professor in 1940.

In 1942 he died of starvation during the Siege of Leningrad.

== Gallery ==
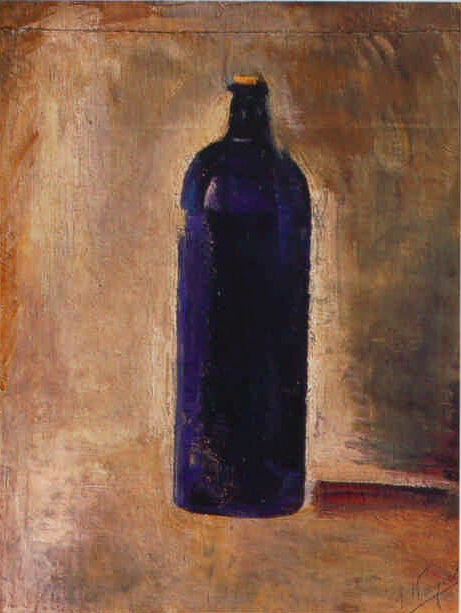

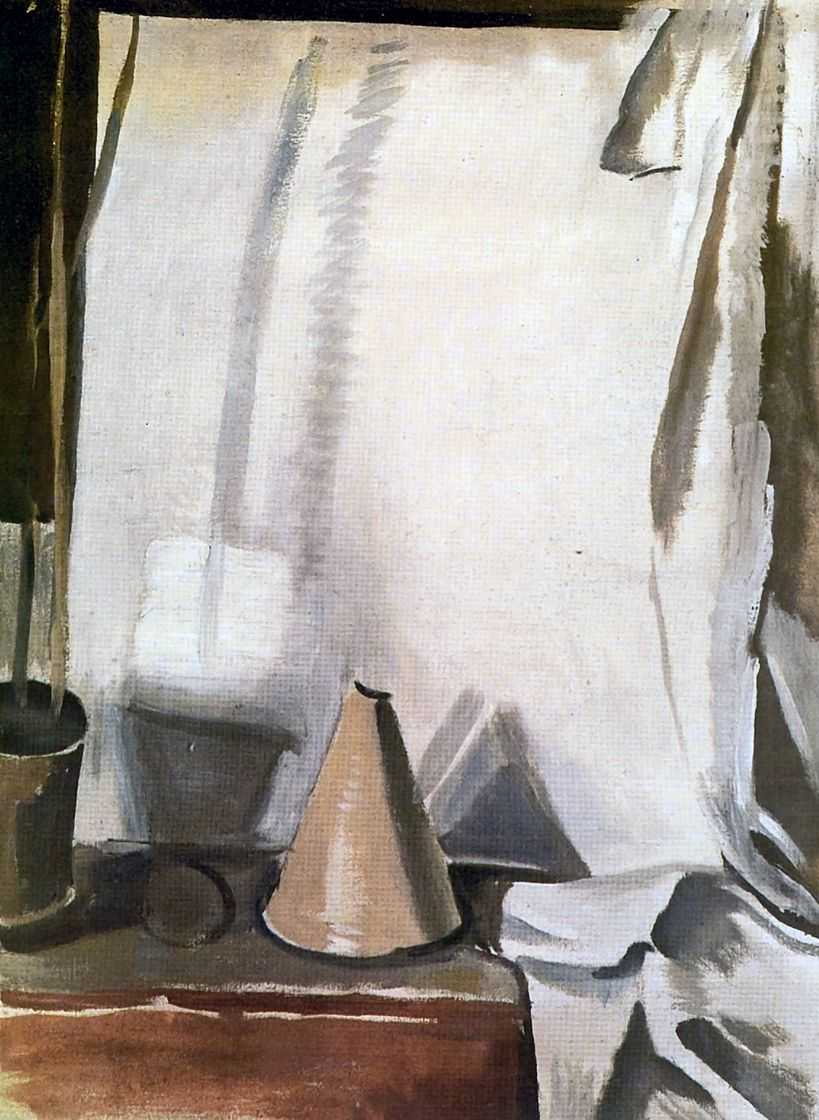
(1921)

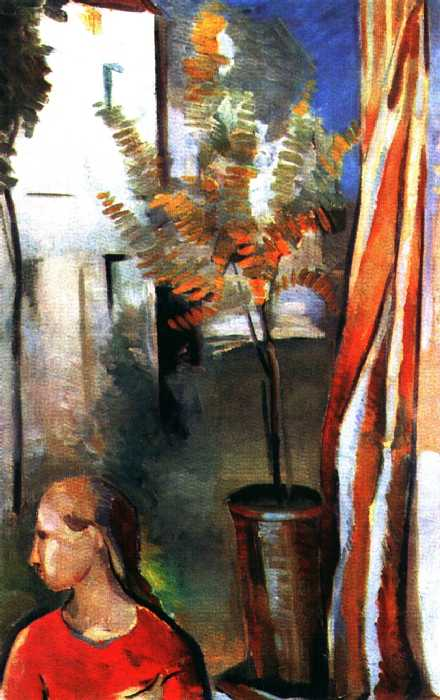
(1922)

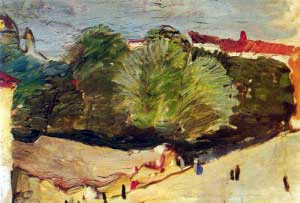
