= Museum of Artistic Culture =

Museum in Russia

The Museum of Artistic Culture was conceived in June 1918 as a means of disseminating contemporary art through a network of participating institutions revolving around the two central museums, the principal one in Moscow, with a second one in Petrograd.

Following a meeting on 1 June 1918 Alexei Karev, Nathan Altman and Aleksandr Matveyev constituted the Commission to decide which artists should be featured in the museum. By December 1918 they had drawn up a list of 143 painters which Anatoly Lunacharsky the head of the People's Commissariat for Education approved. The list was published in Iskusstvo kommuny, and the museum was opened on 3 April 1921.
