= Tombstone of V. E. Borisov-Musatov =

Monument at the Russian artist's burial place

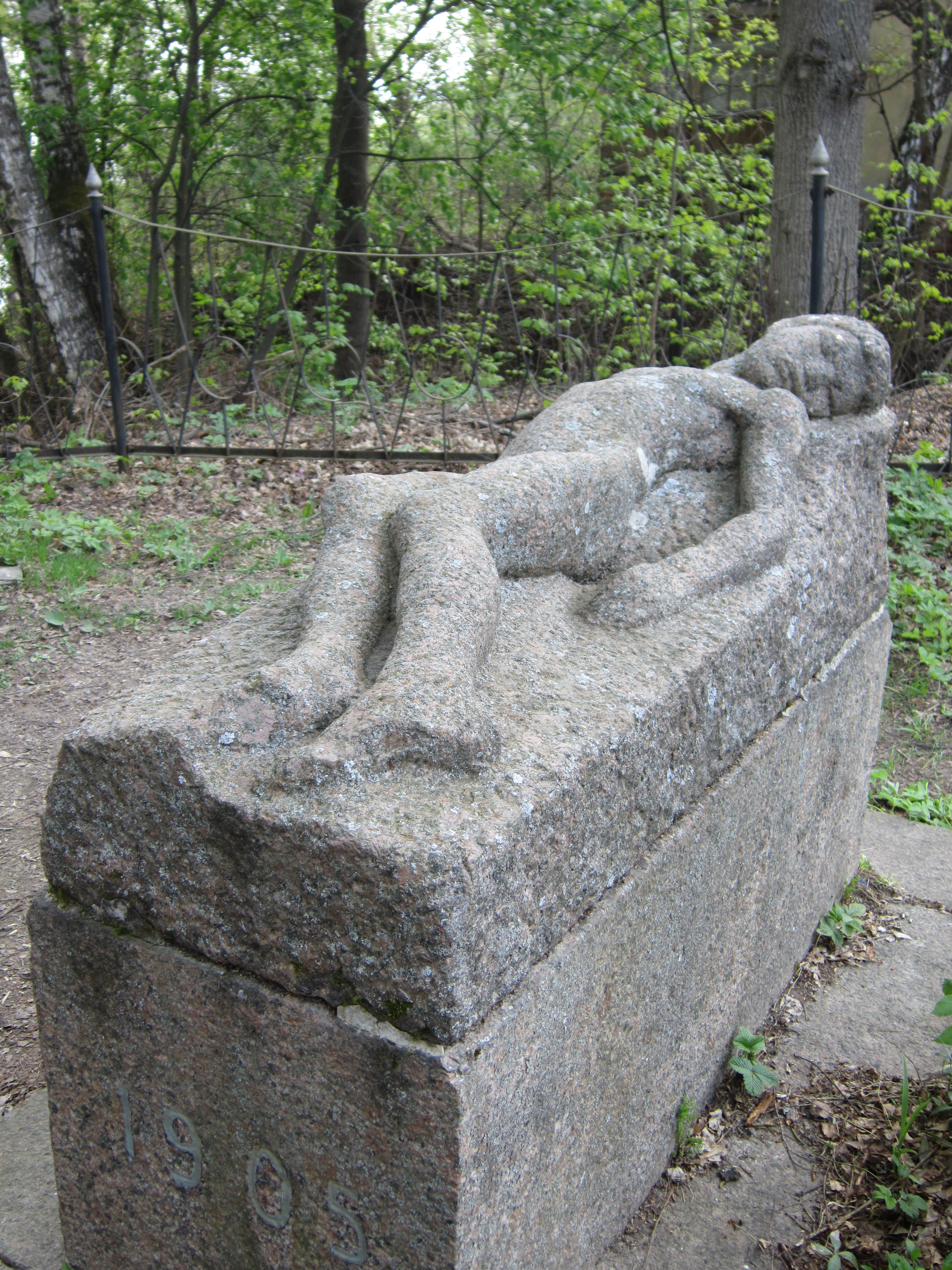
- Tombstone of V. E. Borisov-Musatov.
- Artist: Alexander Terentyevich Matveev
- Year: 1910
- Type: Sculpture
- Medium: Granite
- Subject: Sleeping nude boy
- Dimensions: 53 cm × 143 cm
- Location: Tarusa, Kaluga Oblast

Tombstone of V. E. Borisov-Musatov (Russian: Надгробие В. Э. Борисову-Мусатову) is a monument made of brown granular granite, installed at the burial site of the Russian artist Victor Borisov-Musatov, on the high bank of the Oka on the outskirts of the city of Tarusa in June 1911. The sculptor of the tombstone, the modernist Alexander Matveev, was a contemporary and friend of Borisov-Musatov, and created the tombstone the previous year. It depicts a sleeping nude boy; among local residents, in artistic literature and in mass media, it is known as the Sleeping Boy. According to a legend that has spread among Tarusa residents, the tombstone depicts a teenager whom Borisov-Musatov tried to save from the water. The artist himself allegedly caught a cold in the process, which led to his death.

The tombstone has repeatedly become the object of close interest from researchers of Alexander Matveev's work and Victor Borisov-Musatov's biography. In particular, the Soviet art historian Alfred Bassekhes called the monument an "elegiac response" of the sculptor to the "quiet charm" of the artist's paintings and considered it one of the key works of the most significant period of Matveev's creativity, according to the researcher, which fell in the second half of the 1900s – early 1910s.

The monument on the bank of the Oka has found reflection in Russian culture. In particular, the plot of the story by the Soviet writer Konstantin Paustovsky "The Sleeping Boy" is built around it. The image of the "Sleeping Boy" plays a significant role in the novel by Vladimir Zheleznikov "Scarecrow". The tombstone was captured on their canvases by major Soviet and Russian artists. Among them is a member of the Moscow Union of Artists and employee of TASS Windows Lev Aronov and People's Artist of the Russian Federation Vladimir Korbakov.

== Image on the tombstone and its location ==
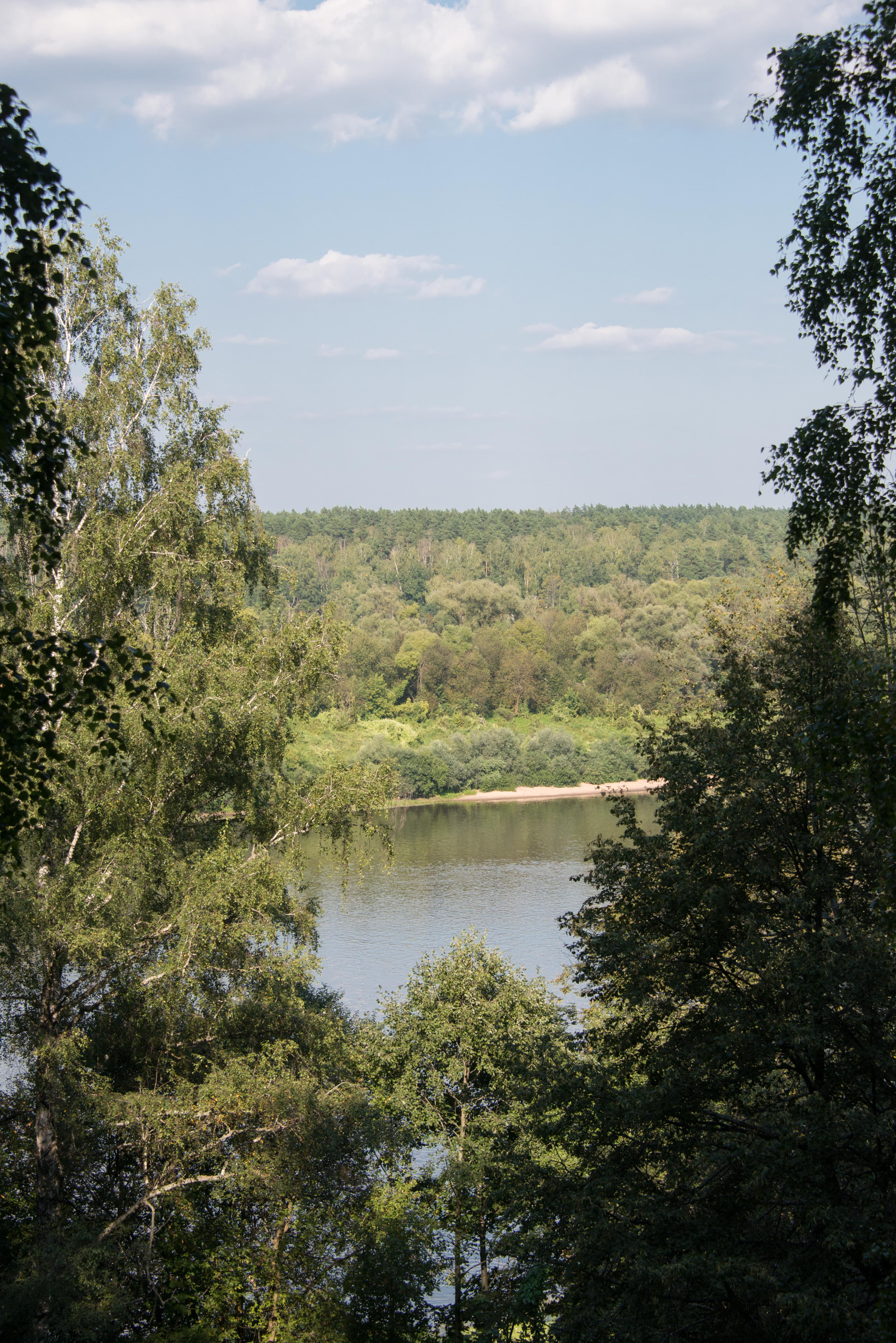
Tarusa. View of the Oka from the Musatov Hillside today

In the Alexander Matveev's works' catalog, compiled by the Soviet art historian Alfred Bassekhes, the sculptor's work is designated as "Tombstone of V. E. Borisov-Musatov in Tarusa". Bassekhes determined its dimensions: 143 cm × 53 cm × 55 cm (56 in × 21 in × 22 in). The pedestal of the sculpture is 145 cm × 54 cm × 55 cm (57 in × 21 in × 22 in), and the plinth is 54 cm × 54 cm × 60 cm (21 in × 21 in × 24 in). Other data is provided in her monograph by Elena Murina. The size of the sculpture "Tombstone of V. E. Borisov-Musatov", according to her, is 143 cm × 53 cm × 65 cm (56 in × 21 in × 26 in). The pedestal and plinth have the same dimensions as indicated by Bassekhes.

Alfred Bassekhes described the tombstone in 1961 as follows: "...on the slab of a low sarcophagus lay the body of a boy. His legs are touchingly pressed together at the knees; his head is powerlessly thrown back—the boy is sleeping, dreaming and turning to stone, birch trees of the rural cemetery sway above him, and behind him the expanses of the landscape shine through". Employee of the Kaluga Museum of Fine Arts Vladimir Obukhov in a monograph on the artist's work, published in 2011, and even earlier M. Tikhomirova in an article in the collection "Tarusa Pages" (1961), cited the description of Borisov-Musatov's grave by the Russian and Soviet artist Anna Ostroumova-Lebedeva, recorded in her diary published only partially on July 23, 1939 (State Public Library named after Saltykov-Shchedrin, Manuscript Department, fund of A. P. Ostroumova-Lebedeva, 1015, file 55, sheets 1–3):

The cemetery where he is buried... is located not far from the former Resurrection Church (Note: The oldest building in Tarusa. Located on Resurrection Hill, which is separated from the city center by the Igumnov Ravine. The church was built in the mid-17th century. In the 18th–19th centuries, it was repeatedly rebuilt.) on the high bank of the Oka, which drops steeply to the river. The grave is in the right corner of the cemetery, almost at the very edge of the cliff... slightly to the left, near it, is a double, spreading birch. On Borisov-Musatov's grave lies a heavy and rather primitively processed pedestal, and on it, also made of granite, is a nude boy. He lies in some helpless pose. It seems that he has just died or is seriously ill. He lies on his back and his legs are slightly bent at the knees and shifted to the side. The head is tilted and also sharply turned to the shoulder. The features are unclear... When you approach the grave, it is framed against the background of the sky, a very open green horizon with forests, greening meadows, and, at the very foot of the hill, the beautiful, briskly flowing Oka. An amazingly good resting place has been chosen for him. I am so drawn there to sit.

The artist wondered whether the sculpture was originally executed so "lapidarly", or whether the contours had weathered and lost their outlines over time. On August 12 of the same year, returning from en plein air studies in the vicinity of Tarusa, Ostroumova-Lebedeva decided to say goodbye to the artist's grave before leaving the city. She wrote in her diary: "For the last time I looked at the carved figure of the boy. Not badly executed by Matveev. Behind the monument—the water ripples, and waves, and sparkles of the Oka. A good place. I stood by the grave and thought, thought..." (sheet 37).

The grave with the tombstone is located on the high bank of the Oka River on the outskirts of the city of Tarusa—on the so-called Musatov Hillside—in a place where the artist often came to sit on his favorite bench and which (according to his wife Elena Vladimirovna Aleksandrova-Skovoroda) (Note: Life years: 1874–1921. Since 1903, in marriage known as Borisova-Musatova) he himself indicated as his favorite during a walk a few months before his death. Art historian Mikhail Nekrasov suggested that the reason for choosing the place for the grave was the desire of his wife, without mentioning the artist's own will. On the impression that the grave on the hillside makes, the Soviet writer Konstantin Paustovsky wrote: "In autumn, from this hillside, an endless Russian distance opens up in the hazy air, so that the heart stops from it. Old birches grow on the cliff. The distance is visible through the net of yellowing and thinning foliage from the wind. In the gaps between the leaves hang pink clouds over "pastures and woodlands".

Several authors associated one of the artist's last painting Autumn Song with this place. For example, poet Yury Mashkov claimed that he heard from the famous Kaluga local historian Ivan Bodrov that it was from the Musatov Hillside that Borisov-Musatov painted this view of the opposite bank of the Oka among the autumn foliage. However, Ivan Bodrov himself wrote in a book on the history of the city of Tarusa that at the beginning of the 20th century the hillside looked completely different compared to the present time. At that time, there was only an old weeping birch on it, near which the grave was placed. Later, the artist's wife planted four small oaks and two young birches here.

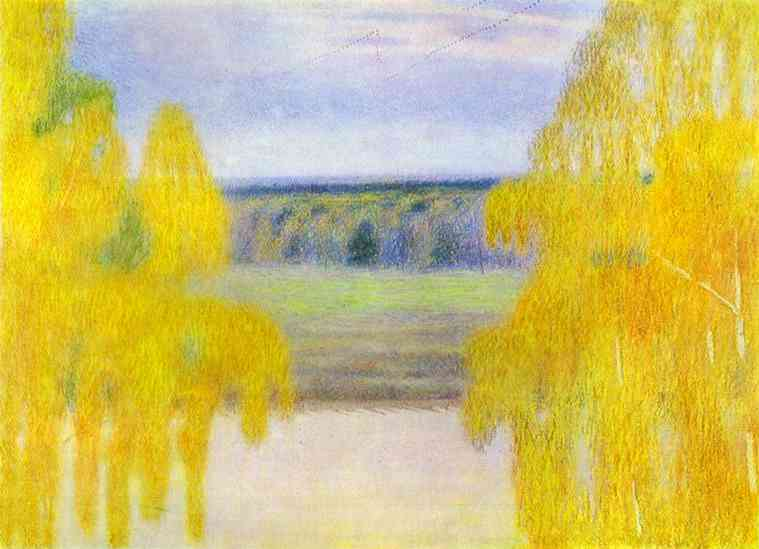
Victor Borisov-Musatov. Autumn Song, 1905. Presumably, the view from the Musatov Hillside to the Oka is depicted

The artist's close friend and author of the first monograph on his life and work, published in 1906, Vladimir Stanyukovich, describes the painting "Autumn Song" in detail, but does not associate the image on it with any specific geographical location in Tarusa. (Note: After Borisov-Musatov's death, his correspondence, notes, and rough sketches passed to Vladimir Stanyukovich. In 1930, the art historian supplemented and revised his monograph on the artist, but it remained in manuscript until 1961. Stanyukovich's archive, along with Borisov-Musatov's documents, is currently located in the Russian Museum.) Doctor of Philological Sciences, Professor of the Moscow Theological Academy Mikhail Dunaev wrote about this painting: "If only Autumn Song had survived from everything created by Borisov-Musatov—we would have the right to say: that was a painter by the grace of God".

== History and final destination ==
=== Death of the artist and growth of interest in his work ===
External videos
- Last days of Borisov-Musatov in Tarusa
- Fragment of excursion in the city on the Musatov Hillside

Victor Borisov-Musatov died in the night from October 25 to 26, 1905 at the dacha of the corresponding member of the St. Petersburg Academy of Sciences and professor of Moscow University Ivan Tsvetaev "Pesochne" near Tarusa, where he was staying with his wife and daughter at the invitation of the hosts in their absence. About his stay there, the artist wrote: "...Now I am in Tarusa. In the wilderness. On the deserted bank of the Oka. And cut off from the whole world. I live in a world of dreams and fantasies among birch groves that have dozed off in the deep sleep of autumn mists".

By 1910, through the efforts of Borisov-Musatov's friends, the artist's first personal exhibition was held in Moscow on his native soil. In 1906, Sergei Diaghilev presented 62 paintings by Borisov-Musatov at the World of Art exhibition in Saint Petersburg, and 22 at the Russian exhibition in Paris. In 1910, a monograph on Borisov-Musatov by the employee of the Hermitage Museum Nikolai Wrangel appeared. Poet Nikolai Poyarkov published a book of poems"In Memory of Borisov-Musatov. Following this, fame came to the artist, who was little known to the general public during his lifetime.

=== Alexander Matveev and Victor Borisov-Musatov ===
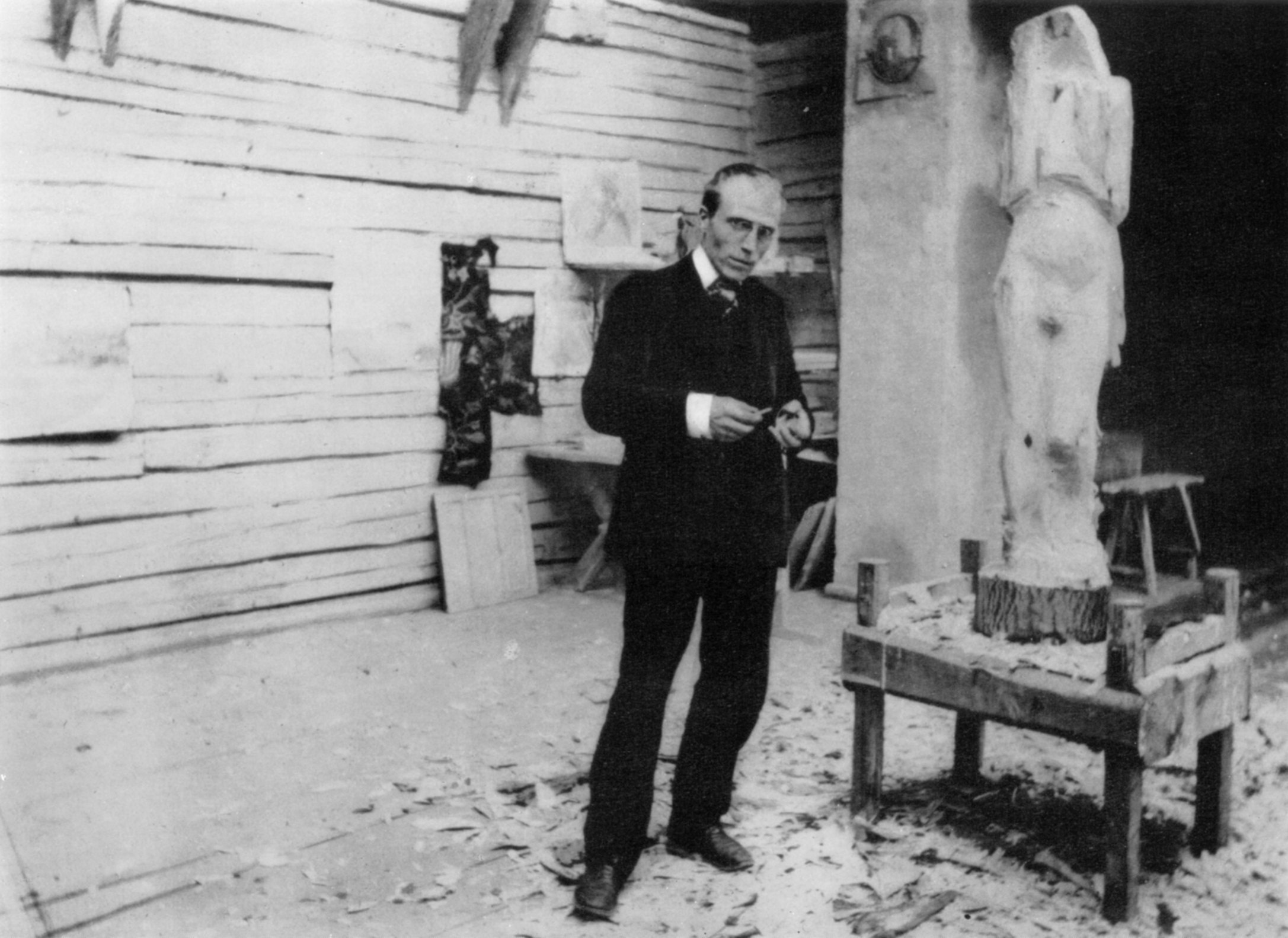
Alexander Matveev in his workshop in Kikerino in 1910. It was there and then that he worked on a plaster study for the "Tombstone of V. E. Borisov-Musatov"

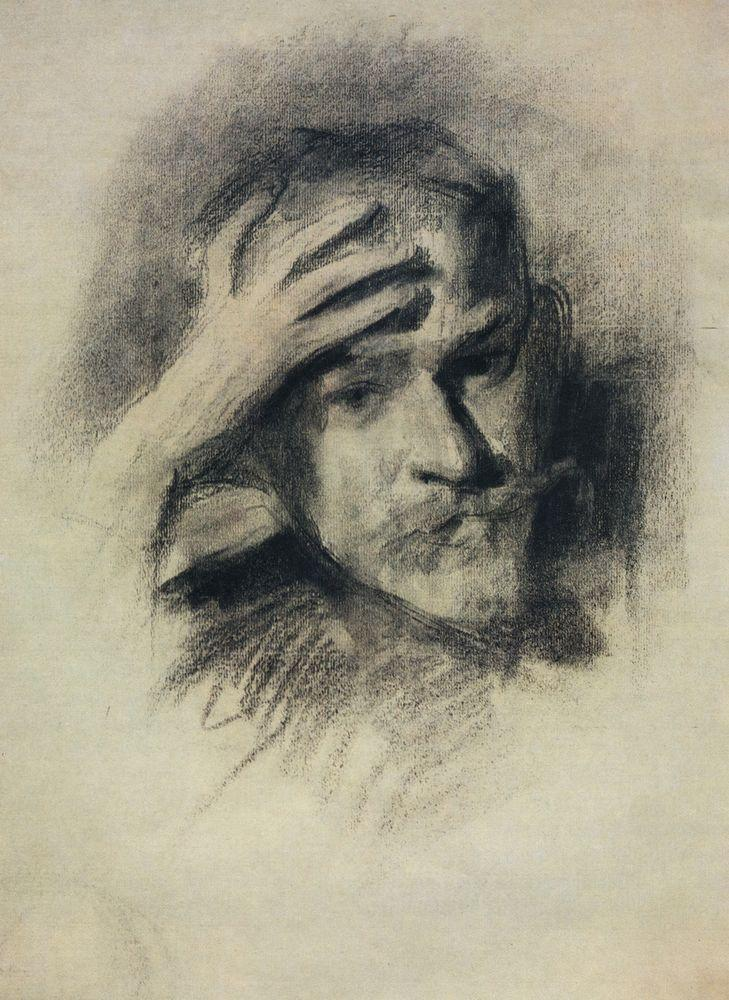
Victor Borisov-Musatov. Self-portrait, 1904–1905

By the mid-1900s, Matveev had stopped his studies, refusing to defend his diploma immediately after receiving a silver medal in the figure class. At the initiative of Vasily Polenov, he went on a creative assignment to Paris at the expense of the fund of the artist's younger sister Elena Polenova. At this time, the sculptor actively participated in exhibitions.

The second half of the 1900s – early 1910s —the period to which the creation of the Borisov-Musatov tombstone belongs— the Soviet art historian Alfred Bassekhes in a monograph on the sculptor, published in 1961, called the peak of Alexander Matveev's creativity. At this time, the sculptor had his own workshop at the factory of the famous Russian ceramist Pyotr Vaulin in the village of Kikerino near Saint Petersburg. Matveev's main genres during this period were portrait and study of the nude. The art historian considered the "Sleeping Boy" the most significant work among them.

Borisov-Musatov was a close friend of the sculptor. Even during his student years in 1900, Matveev made a plaster portrait of him ("Portrait of V. E. Borisov-Musatov", State Tretyakov Gallery, height 61 cm, signed and dated—"A. Matveev, 1900", inv.—SK-1861; in 1959 this work was cast in bronze). Portrait of V. E. Borisov-Musatov depicts a half-figure of the artist sitting in an armchair. Alfred Bassekhes characterized it as a completely independent work of a beginning sculptor and noted the depth of penetration into the personality of the model.

=== Matveev's work on the tombstone ===
Cellist-White émigré Mikhail Bukinnik in the article Story about the artist V. E. Borisov-Musatov wrote that the initiator of the installation of the monument was a group of friends and close associates of the deceased artist ("we still had the task of erecting a monument over Musatov's grave"), who commissioned the monument to Alexander Matveev. From the sculptor's own letter to the art historian and friend of the deceased Vladimir Stanyukovich dated October 31, 1910, the financial terms of the contract with the artist's wife are known, on which Matveev undertook the execution of the order (quoted with preservation of the original punctuation): "Dear Vladimir Konstantinovich! Not so long ago I received a letter from E. V. Musatova regarding the monument, from which I sent her photographs, a letter expressing pleasure, which I am very glad... I would like to receive 200 rubles for the final settlement. — received 700 — remains for transportation and installation 100. Thus it amounts to 1000, as agreed with E. V".

The creation of the tombstone for the artist by the Russian art critic Andrei Levinson was called a "mournful and honorable task". Alexander Matveev conceived the sculpture in the form of a sarcophagus, on the lid of which, as he reported to his friend Vladimir Stanyukovich, there should be a lying figure. According to the Soviet and Russian art historian Konstantin Shilov, Matveev conceived the monument as a truly monumental one: simple, poetic and "proportional to the inner structure of Musatov's canvases and the nature in which it will stand...". Matveev had seen the artist's burial place many times—"the high hillside above the Oka, from which a breathtaking distance opens up". The sculptor chose light-speckled and "giving forms a soft outline" granite for the monument. Shilov wrote that later some art historians would evaluate the monument as roughly processed, but he himself believed that the sculptor's intention was to leave the tombstone "alive", "breathing", "as if natural".

From the point of view of Konstantin Shilov, Matveev, creating the sculpture, imagined a small courtyard in Samara, drowning in grasses and foliage, illuminated by the sun at its zenith. The boy posing for Matveev with narrow eyes lay down on his back in the grass and closed his eyes "in the pose of a sleeping patient or a child who has run enough: arms thrown along the body, legs slightly bent, touching at the knees. He is touchingly defenseless, and even under the lightest breath of the breeze, one worries that he is cold". In his sleep, as Matveev worked on the pedestal, the teenager rose slightly above the grass, and "in his face with slightly slanted closed eyelids, in the swollen lower lip and the fold above the chin, not only helplessness appears, but also as if resentment",—the left hand moves away from the body, the rib cage rises, "the bend of the boy's body pierces with pity and sorrow..."

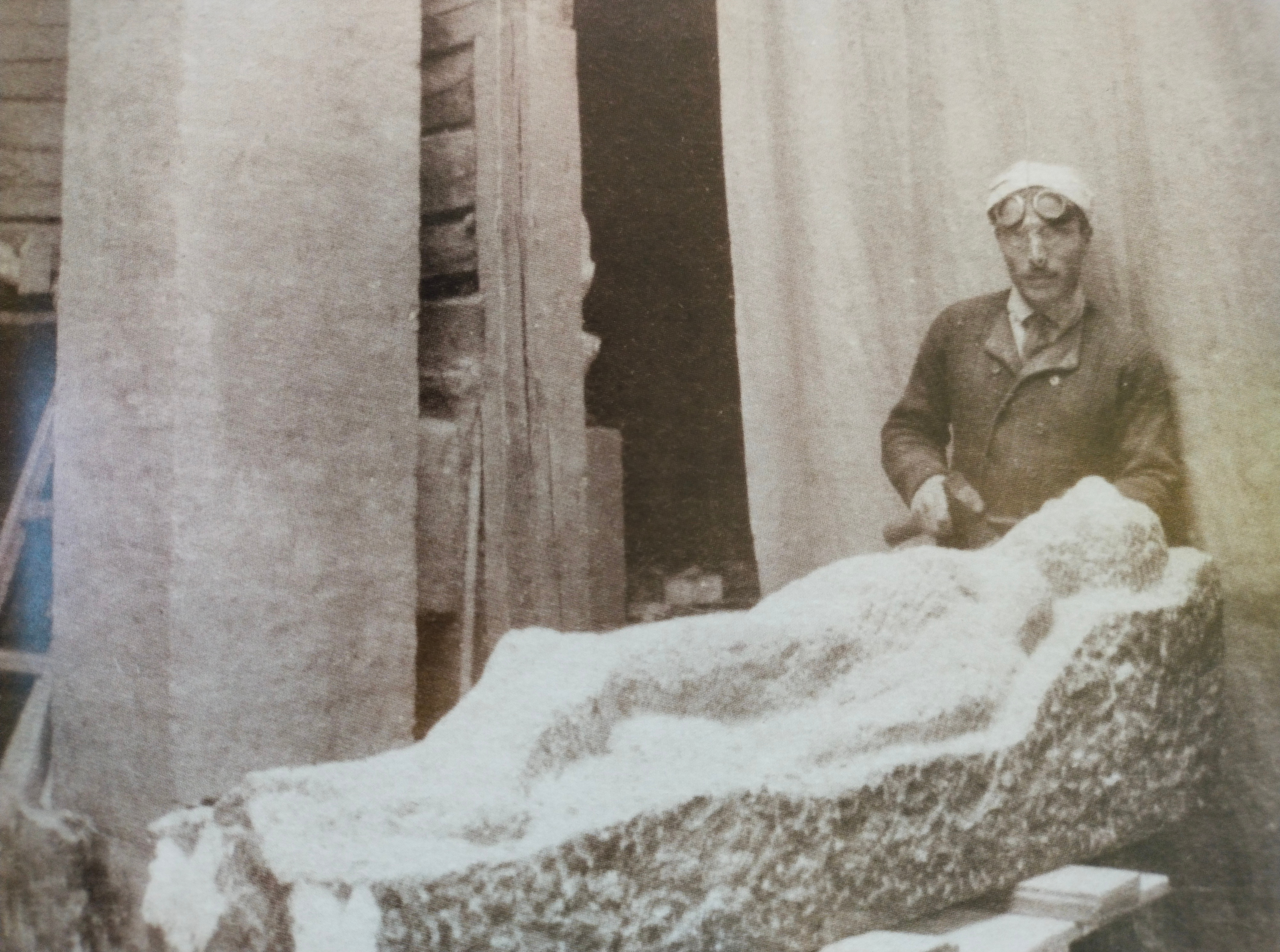
Alexander Matveev working on the tombstone for Borisov-Musatov, 1910

Two suitable stones of gray coarse-grained granite Alexander Terentyevich found in Kikerino, where his workshop was located, as early as June 1910. Matveev wanted Stanyukovich, who wrote the first book about Borisov-Musatov, to see the study for the monument already created by the sculptor. He informed his friend about the completion of the study in a letter dated July 17, 1910. According to Bassekhes, work on the final (granite) version of the tombstone was carried out by the sculptor in Crimea, where he periodically traveled from Kikerino. In Crimea, Matveev worked on creating sculptures for the park ensemble of Kuchuk-Koy. To prove this, the art historian refers to a letter from the sculptor from there, in which Matveev wrote to Vladimir Stanyukovich (with preservation of the original punctuation): "Today, glory to the Almighty—I finished the stone, swallowed dust again and got tired. And it's a boring business to carve and repeat the backs. But still, although the stone is bad—it turned out very well. The thing has truly entered the law even more". Bassekhes dated the translation into granite of the plaster study based on this letter to October 1910. Elena Murina, however, established the dating of the final version in stone as a broad time interval between 1910 and 1912. Moscow writer and local historian Aleksey Mitrofanov dated it to 1911.

A photograph has been preserved that captured Alexander Matveev working on the final granite version of the tombstone, taken in 1910–1911 in the village of Kikerino. Its size is 5.7 by 8.3 centimetres (2.2 in × 3.3 in). It entered the Radishchev Museum of Art in 1978 as a gift from the sculptor's niece M. S. Bocharova-Matveeva and is currently in the collection of the Personal Fund of A. T. Matveev in this museum.

=== Tombstone's installation on the artist's grave ===
When the monument already executed in granite arrived in Tarusa, the initiators of the creation of the tombstone unexpectedly encountered sharp resistance from the local clergy. The clergymen declared it pagan. The following arguments were cited as evidence:

- the tombstone represents the nude body of a youth;
- it does not provide for the presence of a cross on the grave of the deceased artist.

Borisov-Musatov's wife spent a significant amount of time obtaining the necessary permissions for the installation of the tombstone executed by Matveev. Thanks to her numerous petitions, the monument was still installed, but supplemented with a cross.

On May 11, 1911, Alexander Matveev inquired about the fate of the tombstone he had made in an unpublished letter (Russian Museum, archive, f. 27, d. 102, ll. 1, 4, 5, 13). Nevertheless, the modern Russian art historian Mikhail Nekrasov wrote that this event occurred in 1910. The head of the department of museumification of the "Estate of V. E. Borisov-Musatov" at the Radishchev Art Museum in Saratov Eleonora Belonovich wrote that the opening of the tombstone took place on July 6, 1911". This information was published in the magazine Russian Art Chronicle for 1911. She wrote: "A small group of relatives and friends gathered then under the shade of weeping birches on the bank of the Oka, where the master rests. The photographer captured this moment—the trees were hung with garlands of wreaths, repeating the composition of the conceived painting, for which Musatov managed to paint beautiful decorative studies".

== Legend of the Drowning Boy ==
According to the legend, which gained popularity among the residents of Tarusa, the tombstone depicts a teenager whom Borisov-Musatov saved from the water. The artist himself allegedly caught a cold in the process, which led to his imminent death. This story, as a legend, was mentioned in his book Tarusa, published in 1965, by the Kaluga local historian Ivan Bodrov. He clarified that the events of the legend took place on the Oka River, and according to it, the boy could not be brought back to life.

Marina Tikhomirova, in an article about Borisov-Musatov's work in the collection Tarusa Pages, wrote without the slightest doubt about the reality of the event that occurred: "The 'plot' for the monument was the artist's rescue of a boy drowning in the Oka, a child whom it was not possible to bring back to life." She did not attempt to date this event. The leading research associate of the Department of New Trends at the Russian Museum, candidate of art history Lev Mochalov, in a brochure published in 1976, also wrote about this event as a real fact from the artist's biography, but attributed it to an earlier period in his life: "Once Musatov tried to save and revive a drowning child, but without success. The sculpture over his grave — a reminder of this fact". Mochalov reproduced in his book almost verbatim the version of the doctor of art history Alla Rusakova, which she presented in her 1966 monograph. Vladimir Obukhov also perceived the legend as a real fact in his 2011 monograph. He supplemented Mochalov's narrative with new details:

- the artist rushed into the Oka to help the boy immediately upon seeing the drowning one;
- Borisov-Musatov carried the already dead teenager out of the water.

Like Mochalov and Rusakova, Obukhov did not connect the attempt to save the drowning teenager with the artist's death.

== Gypsum copy in the Collection of the Russian Museum ==
A gypsum "Tombstone of V. E. Borisov-Musatov", created by Matveev and usually dated to 1910, has also survived to the present day. It is currently in the collection of the Russian Museum in Saint Petersburg (size — 143 × 50 × 38 cm in the Bassekhes version, inv. no. — SK-930). In Bassekhes's catalog, this work is listed as a "Study for the tombstone of V. E. Borisov-Musatov".

In one of his letters to Stanyukovich from Kikrino, Matveev wrote on July 17, 1910: "I have finished the study for the monument. In a few days I will start on the stone". Soon the sculptor also sent Stanyukovich the future final dimensions of the monument. At the same time, Bassekhes noted that Matveev completed work on the stone tombstone only four months later and not in Kikrino, but in Crimea.

Elena Murina dated the work on the gypsum "Tombstone of V. E. Borisov-Musatov" in the catalog of the sculptor's works, as well as the final version, to 1910–1912. She called this work by Matveev a gypsum cast (implying from the granite tombstone) and therefore did not indicate its dimensions unlike all other works by Matveev. Honored Worker of Culture of the Russian Federation, head of the department of Soviet art at the Russian Museum Tatiana Manturova, named different dimensions for the gypsum work from the Russian Museum collection in her book on Matveev's work — 143 × 50 × 33 cm. In one fragment she called it a study, and the gypsum toned. In another fragment of the same book she called this work a "model and cast" (the verb "is located" stands next to it in the singular). She dated the gypsum version to 1910. In an article on Matveev's work in the magazine "Apollon", Andrei Levinson presented a photograph of the gypsum study for the tombstone, dated it to 1909 in the caption, but did not comment on this image in the text itself.

Alfred Bassekhes set himself the task of comparing the study, which for him was the gypsum "Tombstone of V. E. Borisov-Musatov" from the Russian Museum, and the final version of the work. He discovered traces of "cautious, delicate, but firm, creative reworking of the original concept". He linked this reworking to the necessity of translating the sculpture into a new material — "brown, coarsely grained granite". Bassekhes wrote about the sculptor's desire to preserve in this translation the "freshness and immediacy" of the theme, which at that time was distinguished by its principled novelty. In this aspect, he compared this work with the work of the Russian artist of the 19th century Alexander Ivanov.

Elena Murina was able in 1964 to name only one exhibition at which the tombstone was displayed, while she did not specify whether it was the final version in granite or the version in gypsum (in her understanding — a gypsum cast). Such an exhibition took place in 1958 in Leningrad and Moscow.

== Contemporaries' reviews ==
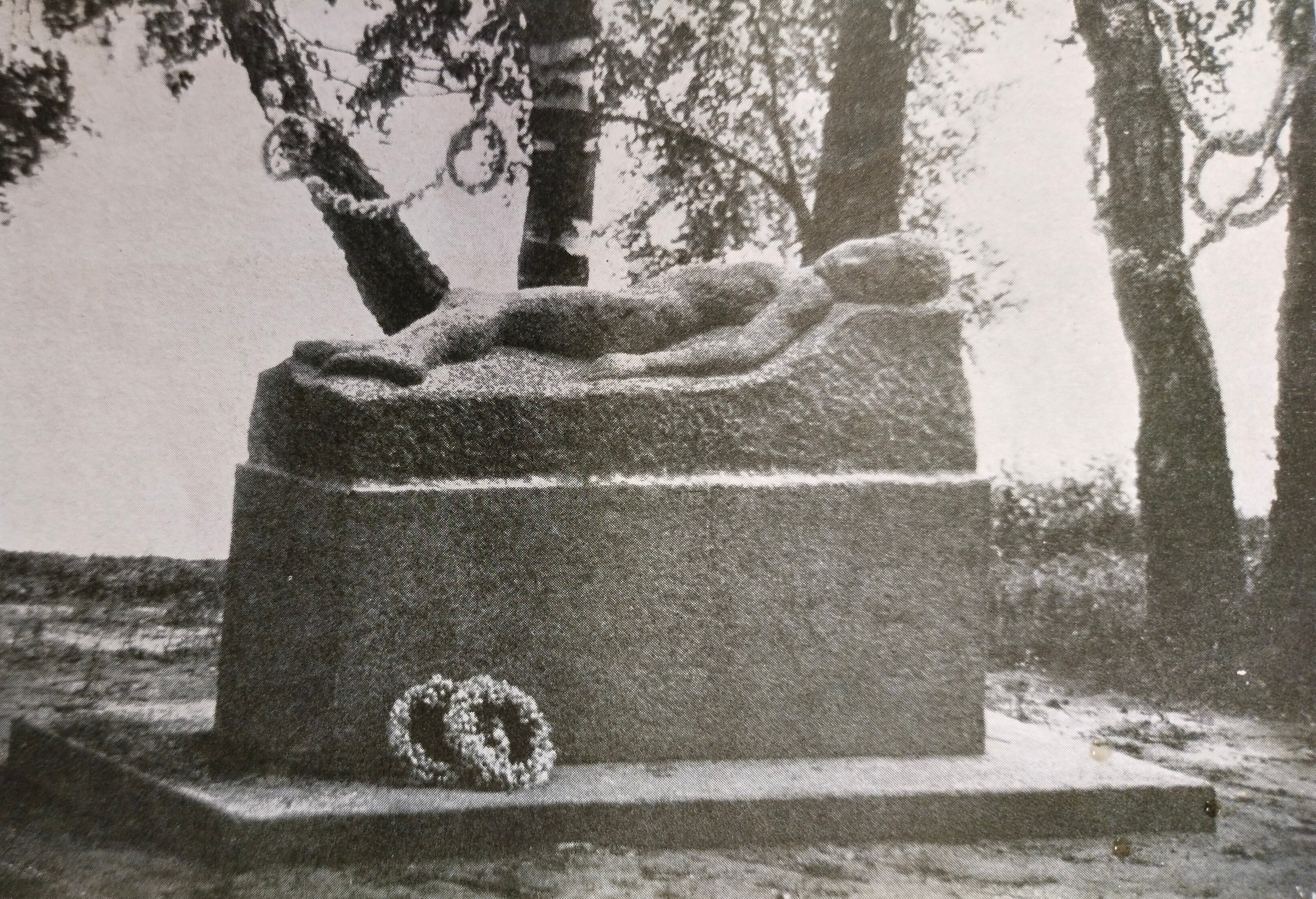
View of the Oka from the Musatov Hill. Photograph from the magazine "Apollon" 1913

In December 1910, the Russian art historian Vladimir Stanyukovich, in a letter to the editors of the newspaper "Rech", highly praised both the artistic merits of the tombstone and its practicality: "it [the monument] is beautiful as an artistic work and durable...".

The artist Alexander Lushnikov, who left memories of Borisov-Musatov, wrote about the beautiful tombstone in the shade of the birches loved by the artist on the bank of the Oka River.

According to Andrei Levinson, the monument expresses the "sincerity and folk characteristics... of the contemplative nature" of Matveev, which sharply distinguish his work from the "saturated full-blooded temperament" of his contemporary—the French sculptor Aristide Maillol. The symbolism of the tombstone's concept is extremely simple, the boy's figure is distinguished by "timid tenderness and chaste coolness". The tombstone evokes melancholy and brings to mind "precious memories". According to Levinson, the dreaminess and sorrow of Matveev's works of this period are excellently combined with the Central Russian landscape (in this case, with the birch grove in which the tombstone is located).

Levinson noted the connection of Matveev's boys with the ancient examples on this theme that have come down to us. The sculptor avoided complex compositions and created his sculptures in a sketch manner, in which the element of narration is absent, and it is precisely for this reason, from the point of view of the art critic, a significant part of them did not have an author's title.

== Tombstone in Russian art history ==
=== In Soviet Art History ===
Alfred Bassekhes called the tombstone of Borisov-Musatov an elegiac response to the artist's work — to the "quiet charm" of his paintings. The art historian emphasized the simplicity and sincerity of the sculptor's work, as well as the successful placement of the tombstone on the high bank of the Oka River. He refused to see any stylization in this work and wrote about the realism of the depiction, noting the sculptor's deep study of nature. Bassekhes characterized the "Sleeping Boy" as a clear work by Matveev with distinct plastic forms. Bassekhes found similarities between this sculpture and three other works by Matveev from this period: the bas-relief "Sleeping Boys", the "Seated Boy" of 1909, and the marble "Youth" of 1911 from the Russian Museum. According to the art historian, the sculptor renounced in these four works both the canons of academicism and "commonplaces", as well as salon effeminacy, and followed the internal logic of the creative process. Bassekhes wrote about the "poetically integral perception of the living rhythm of the depiction of the human body" when perceiving these four sculptures. He asserted that in creating these works, Matveev was inspired by progressive democratic ideals and followed in the wake of the work of such "fighters against all kinds of falsehood" as Anton Chekhov, Valentin Serov, and Konstantin Stanislavski. The Soviet art historian Marina Tikhomirova called the artist's tombstone in a 1961 article a "symbol of youth". Elena Murina devoted only one paragraph to the tombstone of Borisov-Musatov in her large monograph on Matveev's work. She noted that the sculptor expressed "complex human feelings in the language of proportionate plastic harmony", told about Borisov-Musatov as a person and an artist, managed to express sorrow for his death, and presented his reflections on life and immortality. In the work, according to the art historian, the aesthetics of simplicity and restraint predominates, and the work itself is an example of plastic generalization. The image of the sleeping boy affirms the "imperishable beauty of man" and the immortality of the artist Borisov-Musatov himself.

Candidate of art history, corresponding member of the USSR Academy of Arts Natalia Sokolova wrote about the enchanting impression from the tombstone. She called it one of the most poetic tombstones in Russian sculpture. In her opinion, it reproduces that "pure, slightly painful and sad quality that was in the personality and work of Borisov-Musatov". The "touching, helpless quality in this lying childish figure" of the sleeping "naked boy on a simple rectangular coarsely grained stone" echoes, from the point of view of the Soviet art historian, the fate and character of the artist. She also wrote about the successfully chosen location for the monument, selected in the surroundings of weeping birches. Doctor of art history Mark Neiman noted a shade of drowsy dreaminess, light sadness, and lazy languor in the artist's tombstone and believed that this was an involuntary tribute to the moods of the time. The art historian denied that Matveev's works "contain drama, the possibility of rebellious internal struggle". On the contrary, in his opinion, they are characterized by a state of serenity: "Man in them is cleansed of 'life's filth', detached from The everyday process of life, devoid of inner meaning: transient, vain or insignificant, not representing true value; he stands aside from the clashes, does not participate in life, he contemplates it". Neiman noted the symbolism of the monument to Borisov-Musatov: "the thin figure of the boy with his head thrown back powerlessly, sprawled on the cold stone, as it were, erases that mysterious boundary beyond which the state of deep rest imperceptibly passes into eternal sleep. Death does not frighten, it only evokes a feeling of sadness". The art historian wrote that the mournful lyricism of the tombstone corresponds to the atmosphere of the rural landscape surrounding it.

Mark Neiman asserted that when translated into granite, the original figure, made of gypsum, changed somewhat, but at the same time retained the sincere softness and touching artlessness characteristic of the original concept. The Soviet art historian believed that Matveev successfully combined "the boy's figure, made in the form of a high relief, with the architectural part of the monument". The ratio of the wide slab lying at the base of the tombstone and the rectangular plinth, transitioning into a granite bed, is also verified. Summarizing his analysis of the "Tombstone of V. E. Borisov-Musatov", Mark Neiman wrote that "the chamber tombstone can serve as an example of a deeply thought-out synthesis of plastic means with architectural ones, art with the surrounding nature". The Soviet art historian Tatiana Manturova called the "Sleeping Boy" one of the most poetic Russian tombstones, a tribute of respect, love, and admiration for Borisov-Musatov. She characterized it as a bas-relief and noted the adolescent helplessness of the depicted teenager. According to Manturova, the figure expresses "the beauty diffused in Russian nature, poetry, and that special feeling for which there is no name, but which is understandable and familiar to every Russian person". Lev Mochalov devoted an entire page in his brochure on Borisov-Musatov's work to the tombstone. He called this sculpture a plastic symbol of the artist's work: the granite boy is not dead, he is only sleeping. The boy "continues to live in some other scale of space and time". According to Mochalov, "the boy breathes together with his native land, its hills, woodlands, river bends. He dreams together with the drifting mists". The art historian drew a parallel between the tombstone and the artist's work: "Thus dreams, looking at the surroundings, the artist, according to the trends of the era writing sunsets, but remaining always morning-fresh and youthful. He is one of those tormented by spiritual thirst, as befits a prophet, even if his prophecies are not at all thunderous, but whispered, rather confessions to himself".

Full member of the USSR Academy of Arts and corresponding member of the Austrian Academy of Sciences Mikhail Alpatov, who, according to his words, knew the sculptor closely, wrote that Alexander Matveev in the tombstone to Borisov-Musatov "expressed the essence of his older friend... by depicting a sleeping boy on his tomb: not life, not death, but sweet sleep, peace, and expectation of awakening". The Soviet art historian, candidate of art history Igor Schmidt noted Matveev's desire to use in his works "extreme laconicism, an emphatically sparse manner of modeling" and the boldness of "generalization of sculptural forms", which, in particular, manifested itself in his works with children's and female nude bodies. "Tombstone of V. Borisov-Musatov" Schmidt ranked among the most significant works of Matveev's pre-October period. The art historian noted in this work "a lot of childish spontaneity and at the same time awkward youthful angularity".

=== In modern Russian art history ===
Academician of the Russian Academy of Sciences and corresponding member of the Russian Academy of Arts Dmitry Sarabyanov wrote that the tombstone of Borisov-Musatov deserves just as high an assessment as the works made by Matveev for the estate in Kichik-Koi. According to him, the sculptor "as it were, merged the stone and the boy's figure into one, who fell asleep on his granite bed". He noted that "the boy seems to have returned to the stone, to the earth's solidity, but he himself has not petrified, on the contrary, he has spiritualized this solidity". The teenager's relaxed body, his head thrown back, his helplessly bent legs show that the boy did not resist the eternal sleep, in which Sarabyanov saw a "symbol of imperishable beauty". The art historian drew attention to the fact that the granite under the influence of the sculptor acquired softness and pliability, its porous surface creates in the viewer a sensation of living breath. From the point of view of Konstantin Shilov, the sculptor conceived the monument as an "eternally youthful soul of art" and a "symbol of the boyish soul of the older artist-friend", the "feminine-childish purity" of Borisov-Musatov's paintings.

The modern art historian Vladimir Obukhov wrote that the tombstone impresses the most in early spring and late autumn, when through the branches of the trees, still or already not covered with foliage, the surroundings of the hill are well visible. According to the art historian's assertion, this allows one to perceive the past "melancholically-poetically", "in the Musatov manner" — the vicissitudes of the artist's fate and the ambiguity of his work. The art historian described the tombstone: "the naked boy either plunges into the stone mass or emerges from it". The state in which he is — "post-mortem sleep, eternal dream, eternal existence — on the border of being and non-being". Professor-emeritus of the Department of Slavic studies at the University of California, Berkeley Olga Matich classified the "Tombstone of V. E. Borisov-Musatov" in the genre of effigies — three-dimensional sculptural tombstones of lying clergy, knights, kings, and other representatives of secular society. Their progenitors are considered Etruscan sarcophagi with lying figures. In Russia, horizontal images of a person on tomb lids appeared from the 16th century — later than in European cultures. These were images of saints, and although the images were "recumbent", the poses resembled standing figures. In later times in Russia, effigies were also rare and, as a rule, associated with non-Orthodox confessions. She classified Matveev's sculpture in the modern style, called it the most unusual Russian effigy, and asserted that it was carved from "red", in her words, granite. The fact that the tombstone was installed only in 1910 (five years after the artist's death) she explained by the resistance of the Russian Orthodox Church to the depiction of a naked teenager.

Doctor of Medical Sciences, Professor of the Department of Psychology at the Faculty of Psychology of the Syktyvkar State University named after Pitirim Sorokin Viktor Nagaev in the monograph Erotica and pornography. Criteria for Distinction. Problems of Legal Assessment and Expertise (2009) noted that, as in Europe, in Russian fine art of the early 20th century, images of naked boys were popular. The author believed that this theme was central for Matveev. The sculptor, according to the monograph's author, between 1907 and 1915 "carved a whole gallery of little boys". In this series, the jurist placed the Tombstone of V. E. Borisov-Musatov (Nagaev dated it to 1910–1912). However, Nagaev noted that "there was nothing 'pedophilic' in these sculptures, of course, but after 1917 it became impossible to continue this theme". The modern Moscow artist Vera Baева in the book on Borisov-Musatov, published in 2011, adheres to the version that the artist himself shortly before his death indicated the place of his future burial. About the tombstone she writes: "This image subtly reflects the somewhat naive and childish, but romantic character of Borisov-Musatov and his pure and sublime gift".

== Representations and critics in culture ==
=== Story by Konstantin Paustovsky The Sleeping Boy ===
The Soviet writer Konstantin Paustovsky wrote the story The Sleeping Boy. It was first published in the newspaper Socialist Agriculture on May 2, 1957. The plot of the story: the main character returns to a small town (it later becomes clear that it is Tarusa) on the river. He meets the local gardener Leonty Nazarovich at the pier, who dreams of turning this town into a blooming garden and is writing its history. A special place in the future book should be occupied by the stay in this town of figures of domestic fine art. During the conversation, the story's characters recall the stay in Tarusa of Viktor Borisov-Musatov. The main character, from whose perspective the narrative is conducted, mentions in connection with this the state of the artist's grave: "the fence lay broken, near the monument goats grazed and, looking at me with yellow impudent eyes, stripped the bark clean from the neighboring elderberry bush". In response, Leonty Nazarovich asks him: "Have you been to Borisov-Musatov's grave for a long time?" Having said goodbye to the gardener, the story's hero heads straight from the pier to the hill where the grave is located. A sharp change catches his eye: "Even from afar, approaching the grave, I noticed that it was surrounded by a new fence. Everything inside was tidied up, and a large semicircle of recently planted shrubs framed the figure of the sleeping boy, washed clean of clay". Two days later, a new meeting of the story's heroes takes place. Having heard from a friend a story about the old guardian of the tomb of Raphael Santi in Rome, who every week bought flowers from his meager salary and placed them on the tomb of the great artist, Leonty Nazarovich thanks him, but does not mention a word that it was he who put the grave of Borisov-Musatov in order. Doctor of Philological Sciences Nina Khryashcheva and Candidate of Philological Sciences Yulia Sukhorukova saw in Paustovsky's story the idea "of the comparability of different consciousnesses — folk and the consciousness of the intelligentsia — in the ability to perceive and create the beautiful".

=== Article by Konstantin Paustovsky Geographical Notes ===
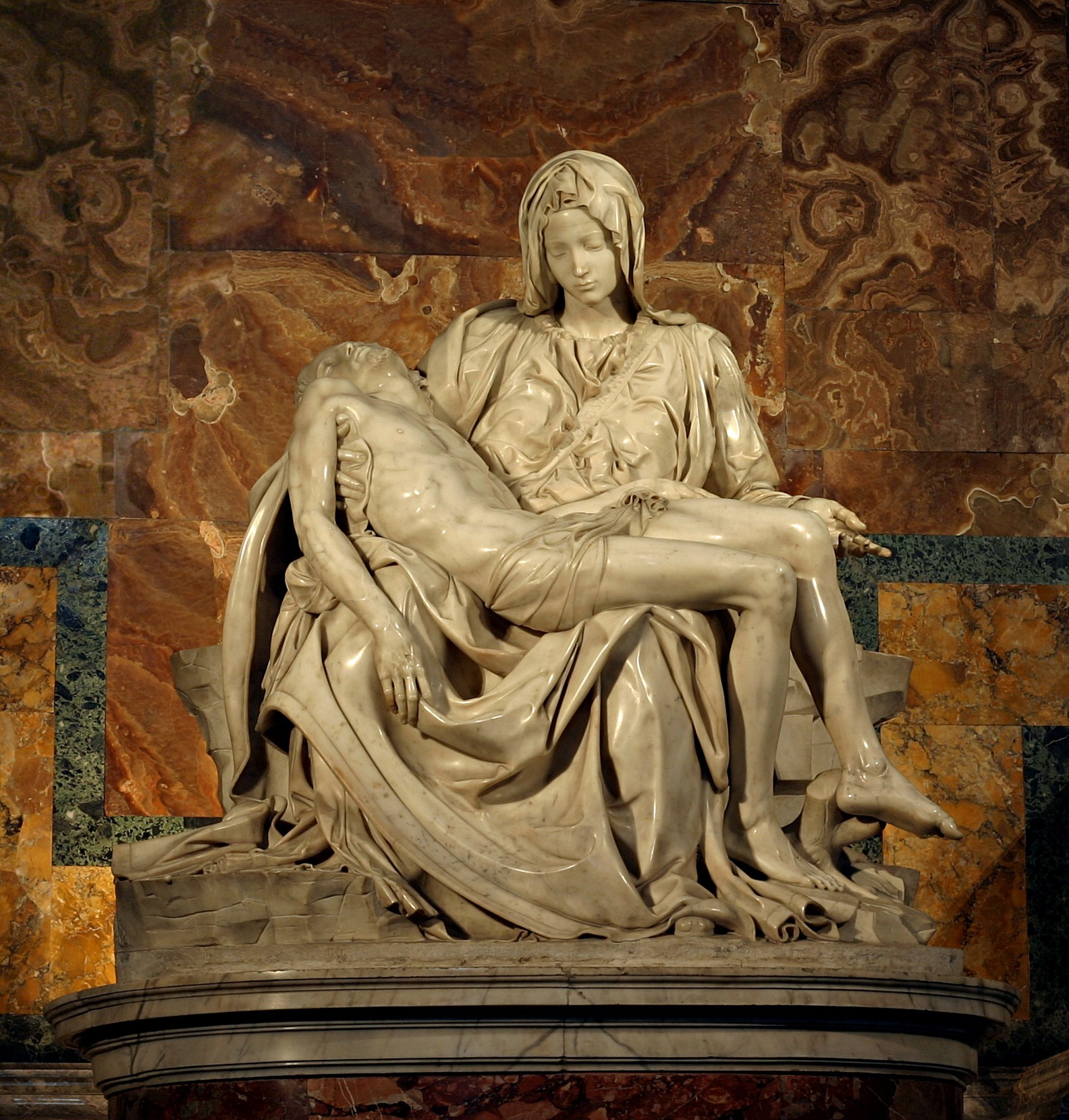
Michelangelo. Pieta, 1497

The article was first printed in No. 12 of the magazine Vokrug Sveta for 1957. It is dedicated to Paustovsky's stay in Rome in 1956. The writer tells about his impressions of sculptural and pictorial works of the Renaissance era, as well as monuments of ancient and early Modern architecture. He calls Alexander Matveev an heir of Michelangelo.

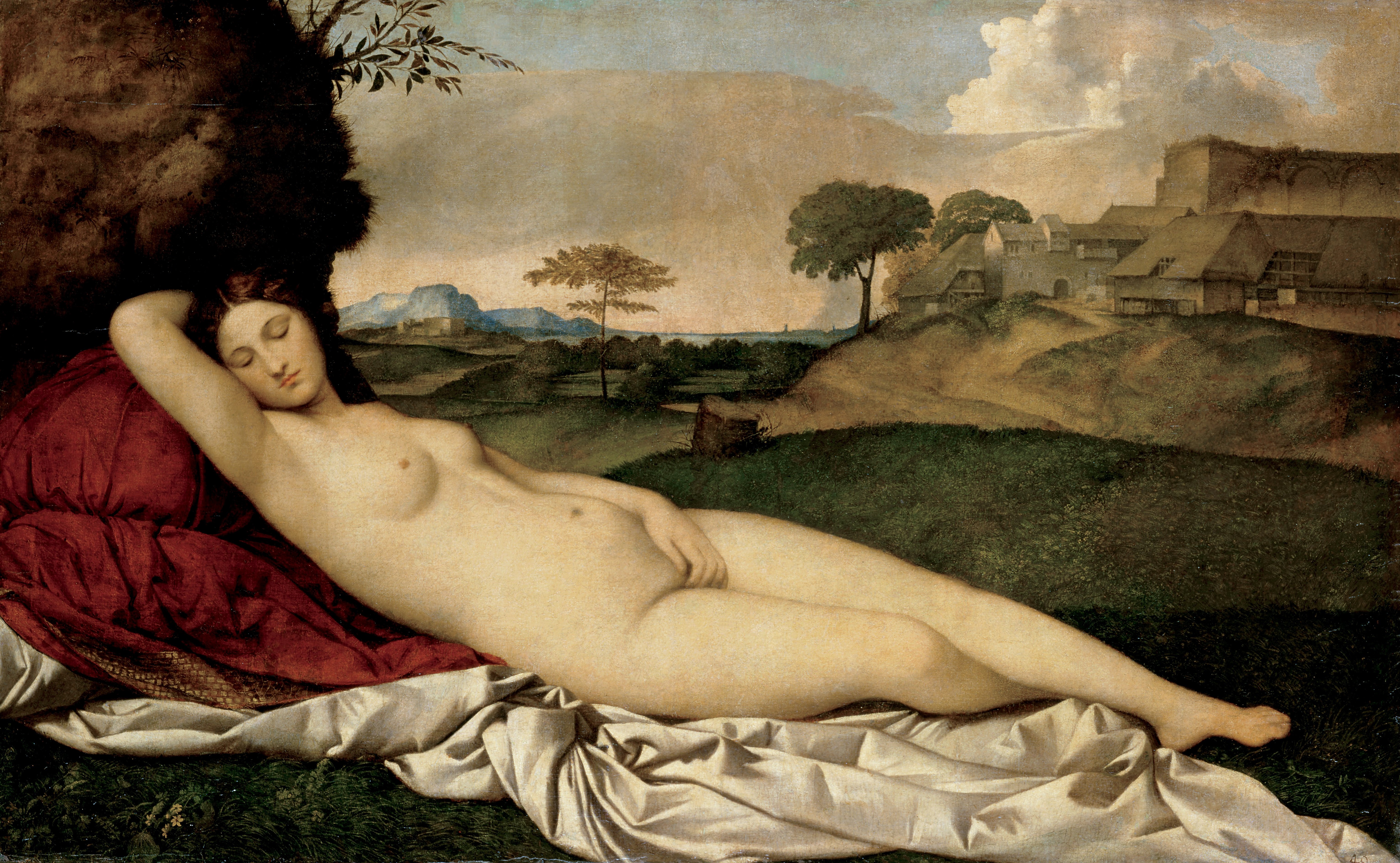
Giorgione. Sleeping Venus, 1508

Twice, while in Rome, Konstantin Paustovsky recalled the "Tombstone of V. E. Borisov-Musatov" — at the tomb of Raphael in the Roman Pantheon and near the sculptural composition "Pieta" by Michelangelo in St. Peter's Basilica in the Vatican. Describing his impressions of this work by Matveev, Paustovsky wrote: "the thoughts that overwhelm you at Borisov-Musatov's grave, I would call autumnal thoughts. They emerge from the depths of consciousness, calm, ringing, like frozen puddles. Thoughts about the continuous flow of that force which we call beauty, that amazing force that passes from century to century and equally captivates us in the stanzas of Homer, in the Madonnas of Raphael, in the 'Venus' of Giorgione, in the bottomless eyes of the Vladimir Mother of God, in the words that 'the gloomy day has died out, the gloom of the gloomy night spreads over the sky like a leaden garment', (Note: The writer quotes the poem The Gloomy Day Has Died Out... by Alexander Pushkin, composed in 1824, which, according to literary scholars, is based on memories of Elizabeth Vorontsova.) in the –village roads of Levitan and the magical haze of Corot". The writer describes in detail in the article the view from the Musatov Hill to the opposite bank of the Oka and the hill itself. He asserts that the artist painted here "his famous landscape — so subtle and pensive that it might seem a dream, if you did not feel that every leaf is warmed by the last warmth of the sun" (Paustovsky does not mention the title of this canvas). Summing up his reflections on the artist's tombstone, Paustovsky wrote that it is necessary to trust "autumnal thoughts", leaving skepticism to those "who are already dead from their own sobriety". From the writer's point of view, skepticism does not adorn life. That alone is enough not to take it seriously.

=== Novella by Vladimir Zheleznikov Scarecrow ===
The sculpture Sleeping Boy is repeatedly mentioned in the novella by Vladimir Zheleznikov Scarecrow (first published in 1981). The action takes place in a small town where a teenage granddaughter Lena comes to her eccentric intelligent grandfather. One day, during autumn holidays, she finds herself near the tombstone of Borisov-Musatov in a poplar grove: "The boy lay on his back, slightly bending his legs, stretching his arms along his body and tilting his head to his shoulder. He was always sad, but today he seemed to Lenka exceptionally sorrowful. Perhaps because the clouds hung too low over the ground, or because Lenka's soul was anxious. Only she felt lonely and unnecessary to anyone here, and she wanted to leave this town immediately..." Lena compares the boy Dima Somov, in whom she is in love, with the figure on the tombstone: "he is somehow all mysterious, like the Sleeping Boy". The only difference she noticed was in the smile: the boy on the tombstone has a frightened one, while the well-off and self-confident Dima's was arrogant for a long time, but after he betrayed his classmates, it became frightened too. The grandfather recalls how Lena first came to him as a child. Then she unexpectedly disappeared, which horrified all the relatives. The grandfather continues: "I found you near the Sleeping Boy. You brought him clothes. You were waiting for him to wake up, and you wanted him to get dressed and go with you. You kept waiting, waiting for him to wake up!... I tell you: it's time to go home. And you started bawling: I want him to wake up, and that's that!... I barely carried you away". Candidate of Philological Sciences Elena Poleva and Elena Myachina in the article "The Image of the Central Heroine in V. K. Zheleznikov's Novella Scarecrow' saw in the image of the sleeping boy, whom Lena constantly visits, the "false chivalry" of Dima Somov. In him, she would like to see a protector of the weak, associating herself, in the researchers' opinion, with the Beautiful Lady. The researchers noted the girl's readiness "to patiently wait for him to wake up from a bad dream". The authors of the article saw in this a correspondence of the girl's image to the "ideal of female wisdom".

=== Other Works ===
In the collection of the State Museum of the History of Russian Literature of V. I. Dal, there are two photographs from the 1930s that captured the tombstone at that time. The Soviet poet-–émigré and art historian Yuri Kublanovsky mentions the tombstone in his poem On the Oka (Continuation) (1977): "With the tilt of the shorn head, the gravestone boy sleeps carefree". Later, in 2001, the poet used these lines as an epigraph to the poem Willows. Doctor of Historical Sciences, head of the Department of Regional Studies at the Faculty of Foreign Languages and Area Studies of Moscow State University Anna Pavlovskaya in the book "Edible History of My Family" recalled how, accompanied by her mother, she visited the grave of Borisov-Musatov. She wrote that her childish imagination was struck by the mysterious story of the death associated with this place. Her mother told how once a boy drowned in the Oka, and the artist pulled him out, but already dead. According to Pavlovskaya, the Oka is indeed famous in this very place for "whirlpools and deep pools, so quite a few people drowned in it". According to the author, Matveev depicted precisely this boy, "moreover, in such a way that it is unclear — did he die or is he sleeping". Anna Pavlovskaya confessed that at that time she knew nothing about Borisov-Musatov at all, but there was some mystical feeling in which the tragic image of the deceased child, painting, Tarusa — everything intertwined into a single whole.

The author of the book "And Life, and Tears, and Love" published in 2022 is the laureate of the Union of Soviet Journalists "Golden Pen of Russia" award and the Russian Union of Journalists Olga Obukhova. The lovers in this detective melodrama — businessman Andrei Androsov and lonely widow Dasha — decide to settle in Tarusa to hide from the revenge of the enraged entrepreneur's wife. They climb the Musatov Hill to lay a wreath of cornflowers on the artist's grave. Androsov tells the legend of the drowning boy whom the artist tried but failed to save, dying shortly thereafter. On the hill, they meet and talk with the famous Soviet and Russian artist Dmitry Zhilinsky, his wife, and son. The tombstone was captured by famous Soviet and modern Russian artists. Among them Lev Arnov (Grave of Borisov-Musatov. Tarusa, 1966), Alexander Volkov ("Tarusa. Tombstone by sculptor Matveev on the grave of V. E. Borisov-Musatov", 1978, oil, cardboard, 73 × 49.5 cm, Municipal budgetary institution Museum of the History of the City of Obninsk, inv. IZO-1063), Lev Korchemkin. Member of the Union of Artists of the USSR ("Tombstone to Borisov-Musatov in Tarusa", 1982, paper, watercolor, 30.5 × 44 cm), and Vladimir Korbakov ("Sleeping Boy. Sculpture by Matveev on the grave of Borisov-Musatov in Tarusa", 2011, canvas, oil, 130 × 150 cm, Vologda Regional Art Gallery, inv. 3597-Zh). In 1986, a postal postcard "Monument-tombstone on the grave of V. E. Borisov-Musatov. Author A. Matveev. Oka. Tarusa river reach" was issued in the set of postcards "Tarusa" from the series "Memorable Places of the USSR".

== Bibliography ==
- Bukinnik, M. E. (2020). "Story about the artist V. E. Borisov-Musatov". Венок Виктору Борисову-Мусатову (Wreath to Viktor Borisov-Musatov). Comp. E. N. Belonovich. Inspired by the Musatov muse. Relay of generations preserving the memory of the artist. Saratov: Society of Friends of the Radishchev Museum, Saratov Art Museum named after A. N. Radishchev. pp. 123–136. ISBN 978-5-9437-0037-8.
- Lushnikov, A. A. (2020). "Viktor Elpidiforovich Borisov-Musatov. 1870–1905". Венок Виктору Борисову-Мусатову (Wreath to Viktor Borisov-Musatov). Comp. E. N. Belonovich. Inspired by the Musatov muse. Relay of generations preserving the memory of the artist. Saratov: Society of Friends of the Radishchev Museum, Saratov Art Museum named after A. N. Radishchev. pp. 153–158. ISBN 978-5-9437-0037-8.
- Pavlovskaya, A. V. (2021). "[Tarusa]". Съедобная история моей семьи (Edible History of My Family). Moscow: SelfPub. ISBN 978-5-0436-7826-3.
- Pushkin, A. S. (1959). "Nasty day has faded...". Собрание сочинений в 10 томах (Collected Works in 10 Volumes). Vol. 2. Poems 1823–1836. Moscow: State Publishing House of Artistic Literature. p. 45.
- Stanyukovich, V. K. (December 21, 1910). "Letter to the Editor". Rech.
- Alpatov, M. V. (1979). "Art Nouveau in Russia (lecture outline)". Этюды по всеобщей истории искусств (Studies on the General History of Arts). Moscow: Soviet Artist. pp. 218–223.
- Baева, V. G. (2011). "Requiem". Борисов-Мусатов (Borisov-Musatov). Great Artists. Vol. 73. Moscow: Komsomolskaya Pravda / Direct-Media. pp. 46–47. ISBN 978-5-4475-4126-2.
- Bassekhes, A. I. (1961). Александр Терентьевич Матвеев (Aleksandr Terentievich Matveev). Moscow: Soviet Artist.
- Belonovich, E. N. (2020). "Viktor Borisov-Musatov in the Memoirs of Contemporaries". Венок Виктору Борисову-Мусатову (Wreath to Viktor Borisov-Musatov). Comp. E. N. Belonovich. Inspired by the Musatov muse. Relay of generations preserving the memory of the artist. Saratov: Society of Friends of the Radishchev Museum, Saratov Art Museum named after A. N. Radishchev. pp. 9–14. ISBN 978-5-9437-0037-8.
- Bodrov, I. Ya. (1965). "City of Artists". Таруса (Tarusa). Tula: Priokskoe Book Publishing House. pp. 61–94.
- Vrangel, N. N. (1916). Борисов-Мусатов (Borisov-Musatov). Modern Art: Series of Illustrated Monographs. Issue 1. Petrograd: Publishing House of N. I. Butkovskaya.
- Dunaev, M. M. (1993). "Elusive Happiness. Creative Recognition. Death. Podolsk, Moscow, Tarusa. 1904–1905". Борисов-Мусатов (Borisov-Musatov). Life in Art. Moscow: Iskusstvo. pp. 145–180. ISBN 5-2100-2103-3.
- Levinson, A. Ya. (1913). "A. T. Matveev". Apollon (8). St. Petersburg: Partnership R. Golike and A. Vilborg: 5–14.
- Manturova, T. B. (1974). Александр Матвеев (Aleksandr Matveev). Masters of Russian and Soviet Art in the Collection of the State Russian Museum. Moscow: Izobrazitelnoe Iskusstvo.
- Matich, O. (2021). "Chapter 7. Moscow Cemeteries". Музеи смерти. Парижские и московские кладбища (Museums of Death. Parisian and Moscow Cemeteries). Criticism and Essayistics. Moscow: New Literary Review. ISBN 978-5-4448-1619-6.
- Mochalov, L. V. (1976). Виктор Эльпидифорович Борисов-Мусатов (Viktor Elpidiforovich Borisov-Musatov). Popular Library on Art. Leningrad: Khudozhnik RSFSR.
- Murina, E. B. (1964). Александр Терентьевич Матвеев (Aleksandr Terentievich Matveev). Moscow: Iskusstvo.
- Nagaev, V. V. (2009). "Section 1. Erotic — Sensual-Sexual Life of Humanity". Эротика и порнография. Критерии различий. Проблемы правовой оценки и экспертизы (Erotica and Pornography. Criteria for Distinction. Problems of Legal Assessment and Expertise). Forensic Expertise. Moscow: Law and Right, Unity-Dana. pp. 9–35. ISBN 978-5-2380-1584-2.
- Neiman, M. L. (1968). "Chapter 2. Sculpture". История русского искусства в 13 томах (History of Russian Art in 13 Volumes). Vol. X. Book II. Moscow: Nauka. pp. 275–352.
- Nekrasov, M. (2019). "On the Banks of the Oka near Tarusa. From the Life of Vasily Polenov, Ivan Tsvetaev, and Viktor Borisov-Musatov". Appendix to the Tretyakov Gallery Magazine. 3 (64). Moscow. ISSN 1729-7621.
- Obukhov, V. M. (2011). "Posthumous Life / Over the Oka". В. Борисов-Мусатов. Жизнь и творчество (V. Borisov-Musatov. Life and Work). Fatherland. Kaluga: Zolotaya Alleya. pp. 132–135 / 136–138. ISBN 978-5-7111-0496-4.
- Poleva, E. A.; Myachina, E. I. (2015). "The Image of the Central Heroine in V. K. Zheleznikov's Story "Scarecrow"". Vestnik of Tomsk State Pedagogical University. 6 (159). Tomsk: 208–212.
- Rusakova, A. A. (1966). "Chapter Six". Виктор Эльпидифорович Борисов-Мусатов. 1870–1905 (Viktor Elpidiforovich Borisov-Musatov. 1870–1905). Painting. Sculpture. Graphics. Leningrad–Moscow: Iskusstvo. pp. 97–108.
- Sarabyanov, D. V. (2001). "Chapter 8. Sculpture". История русского искусства, конца XIX — начала XX века (History of Russian Art, End of the 19th – Beginning of the 20th Century). Moscow: Galart, AST-Press. pp. 239–267. ISBN 5-7805-0694-9.
- "Mix". Russkaya Khudozhestvennaya Letopis. Apollon (12). St. Petersburg: Partnership R. Golike and A. Vilborg: 195–196. September 1911.
- Sokolova, N. I. (1966). "Russian Art of the End of the 19th – Beginning of the 20th Century. Sculpture". Всеобщая история искусств в 6 томах (General History of Arts in 6 Volumes). Vol. 6. Art of the 20th Century. Book 2. Moscow: Iskusstvo. pp. 59–71.
- Stanyukovich, V. K. (1906). Виктор Эльпидифорович Борисов-Мусатов (Viktor Elpidiforovich Borisov-Musatov). St. Petersburg: Publishing House of the Trud Partnership.
- Tikhomirova, M. A. (1961). "New Materials on the Life and Work of V. E. Borisov-Musatov". Тарусские страницы. Литературно-художественный сборник. Comp. N. D. Otten (Tarusa Pages. Literary and Artistic Collection. Comp. N. D. Otten). Kaluga: Kaluga Book Publishing House. pp. 261–266.
- Khryashcheva, N. P.; Sukhorukova, Yu. A. (2012). "Late Work of K. G. Paustovsky: Movement toward the Poetics of Metaprose". Ural Philological Herald. Series: Russian Literature of the 20th–21st Centuries: Directions and Trends (1). Yekaterinburg: 71–83.
- Shilov, K. V. (2000). "Autumn Song". Борисов-Мусатов (Borisov-Musatov). Zhizn Zamechatelnykh Lyudei. Biographical Series. Volume 781. Moscow: Molodaya Gvardiya. pp. 313–393. ISBN 5-2350-2384-6.
- Schmidt, I. M. (1981). "Russian Art". История искусства народов СССР в 9 томах (History of the Art of the Peoples of the USSR in 9 Volumes). Vol. 6. Art of the Second Half of the 19th – Beginning of the 20th Century. Moscow: Izobrazitelnoe Iskusstvo. pp. 17–190.
- Zheleznikov, V. K. (2005). Чучело (Scarecrow). School Library. Moscow: Detская Literatura. ISBN 978-5-0800-5759-5.
- Kublanovsky, Yu. M. (1993). "On the Oka (Continuation)". Чужбинное (Alien Land). Moscow: Moskovsky Rabochy. pp. 219–220. ISBN 5-2390-1415-9.
- Kublanovsky, Yu. M. (2005). "Willows". Дольше календаря (Longer than the Calendar). Poetic Library. Moscow: Vremya. pp. 678–679. ISBN 5-9411-7153-6.
- Obukhova, O. I. (2022). И жизнь, и слезы, и любовь (And Life, and Tears, and Love). Moscow: SelfPub. ISBN 978-5-0441-5269-4.
- Paustovsky, K. G. (1983). "Geographical Notes". Vokrug Sveta (12). Tashkent: Ukituvchi: 165–170. ISSN 0321-0669.
- Paustovsky, K. G. (1957). "Уснувший мальчик (The Sleeping Boy)". Sotsialisticheskoe Zemledelie. Moscow.
- Mashkov, Yu. (2018). "Tarusa". Встречи с прошлым. Стихи (Encounters with the Past. Poems). Moscow: Ridero. ISBN 978-5-4490-3963-7.
- Mitrofanov, A. G. (2015). Вокруг Москвы. Истории для путешествий (Around Moscow. Stories for Travelers). Cities and People. Moscow: Kolibri. ISBN 978-5-3890-6921-3.
- Rassokhin, O. (2019). "The Musatov Hillside". Подмосковье пешком. Самые интересные прогулки по Московской области (Podmoskovye on Foot. The Most Interesting Walks in the Moscow Region). Moscow: Bombora. p. 191. ISBN 978-5-6999-6203-7.
