= IZO-Narkompros =

IZO-Narkompros was the Department of Fine Arts of the People's Commissariat for Education established after the Bolshevik seizure of power in Russia 1917. It was established in Petrograd (St Petersburg) on 29 January 1918.

An Arts Board (Khudozhestvennaya kollegiya) was set up to run the organisation:

- David Shterenberg (president) – painter
- Nathan Altman – painter, stage designer and book illustrator.
- Sergey Chekhonin – graphic artist,[2] portrait miniaturist, ceramicist, and illustrator
- Alexei Karev – painter, graphic artist
- Aleksandr Matveyev – sculptor
- Nikolai Punin – art scholar
- Peter Vaulin – ceramicist
- Gregory Yatmanov

In the summer of 1918 the board was increased:

- Vladimir Baranov-Rossine
- Osip Brik
- Iosif Shkolnik – painter
- Vladimir Mayakovsky
- Lev Ilyin
- Vladimir Dubenetsky
- Lev Rudnev
- Ernests Štālbergs
- Vladimir Shchuko.

IZO organised twenty‐one art exhibitions between 1918 and 1921.
