= Victor Borisov-Musatov =

Russian painter

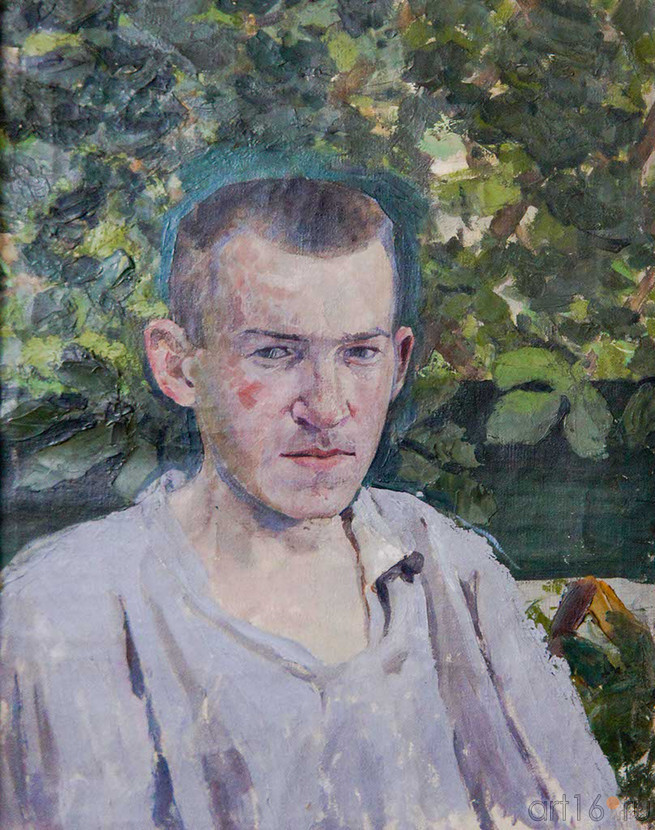
- Self-portrait
- Born: Victor Elpidiforovich Borisov-Musatov; 14 April 1870; Saratov, Saratov Governorate, Russian Empire
- Died: 8 November 1905 (aged 35); Tarusa, Kaluga Governorate, Russian Empire
- Resting place: Musatov Kosogor, Tarussky District
- Known for: Painting
- Movement: Symbolism

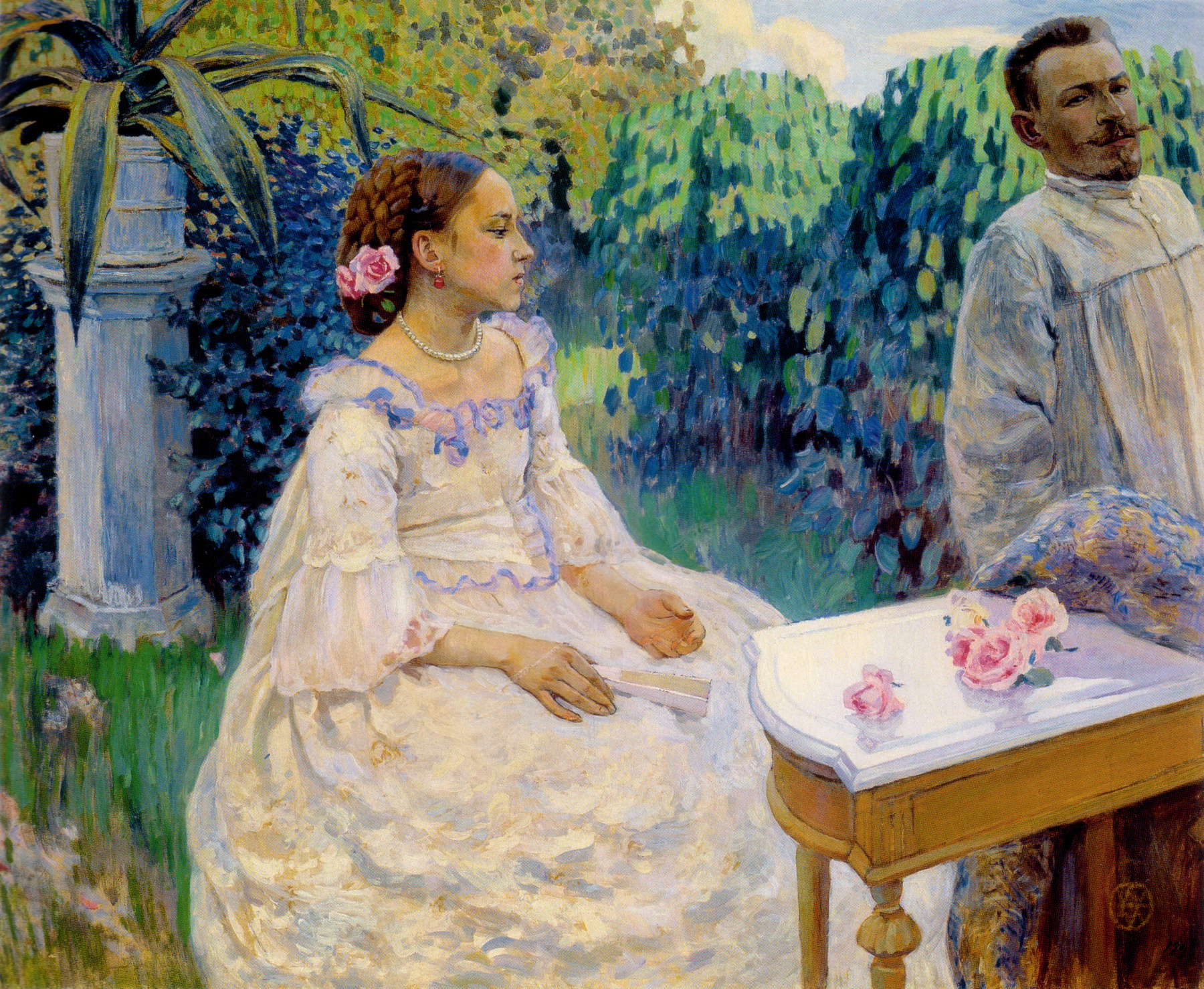
Self-Portrait with sister, 1898

Victor Elpidiforovich Borisov-Musatov (Russian: Ви́ктор Эльпидифо́рович Бори́сов-Муса́тов; 14 April [O.S. 2 April] 1870 – 8 November [O.S. 26 October] 1905) was a Russian painter during the Belle Époque, prominent for his unique Post-Impressionistic style that mixed Symbolism, pure decorative style and realism. Together with Mikhail Vrubel he is often referred as the creator of Russian Symbolism style.

== Biography ==
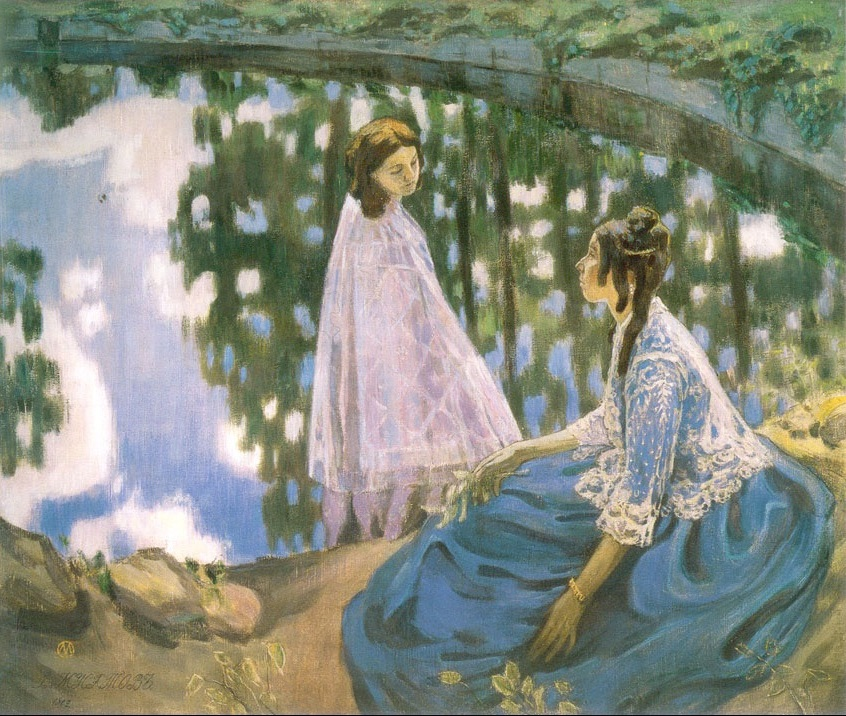
The Pool. 1902

Victor Musatov was born in Saratov, Russian Empire (he added the last name Borisov later). His father was a minor railway official who had been born as a serf. In his childhood he suffered a spinal injury, which made him humpbacked for the rest of his life. In 1884 he entered Saratov real school, where his talents as an artist were discovered by his teachers Fedor Vasiliev and Konovalov.

He was enrolled in the Moscow School of Painting, Sculpture and Architecture in 1890, transferring the next year to the Imperial Academy of Arts in Saint-Petersburg, where he was a pupil of Pavel Chistyakov. The damp climate of Saint-Petersburg was not good for Victor's health and in 1893 he was forced to return to Moscow and re-enroll to the Moscow School of Painting, Sculpture and Architecture. His earlier works like May flowers, 1894 were labelled decadent by the school administration, who sharply criticised him for making no distinction between the girls and the apple trees in his quest for a decorative effect. The same works however were praised by his peers, who considered him to be the leader of the new art movement.

In 1895 Victor once again left Moscow School of painting, sculpturing and architecture and enrolled in Fernand Cormon's school in Paris. He studied there for three years, returning in summer months to Saratov. He was fascinated by the art of his French contemporaries, and especially by the paintings of "the father of French Symbolism" Pierre Puvis de Chavannes and by the work of Berthe Morisot.

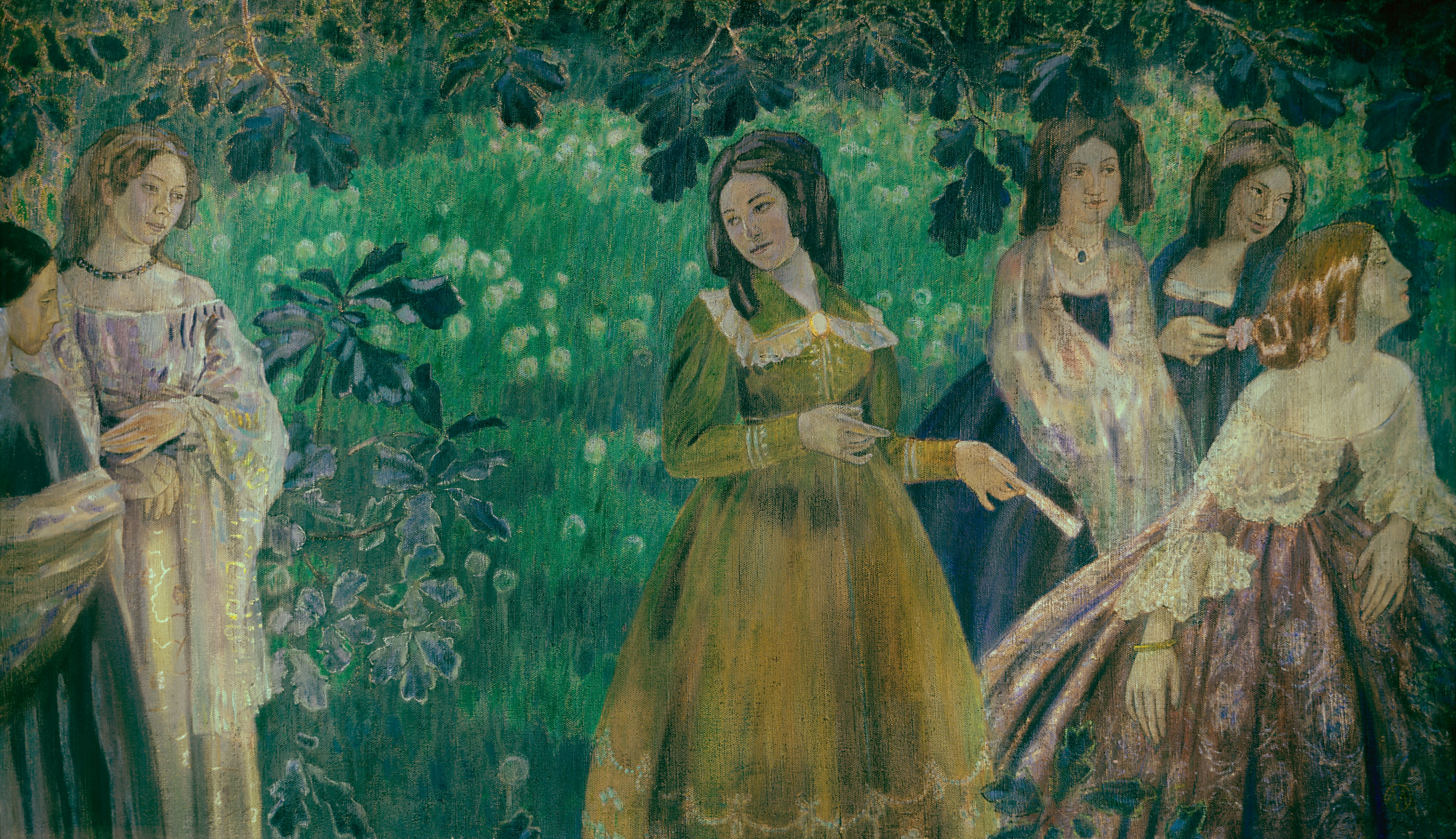
The Emerald Necklace

In 1898 Borisov-Musatov returned to Russia and almost immediately fell into what it is called "fin de siècle nostalgia". He complained about "the cruel, the truly iron age", "dirt and boredom", "devil's bog", and he had acute money problems that were somewhat alleviated only in the last years of his life when collectors started to buy his paintings. Musatov's response was creating a half-illusory world of the 19th century nobility, their parks and country-seats. This world was partially based on the estate of princes Prozorvky-Galitzines Zubrilovka and partially just on Musatov's imagination. Borisov-Musatov also abandoned oil paintings for the mixed tempera and watercolor and pastel techniques that he found more suitable for the subtle visual effects he was trying to create.

Borisov-Musatov was a member of the Union of Russian Artists and one of the founders and the leader of the Moscow Association of Artists, a progressive artistic organization that brought together Pavel Kuznetsov, Peter Utkin, Alexander Matveyev, Martiros Saryan, Nikolai Sapunov, and Sergei Sudeikin.

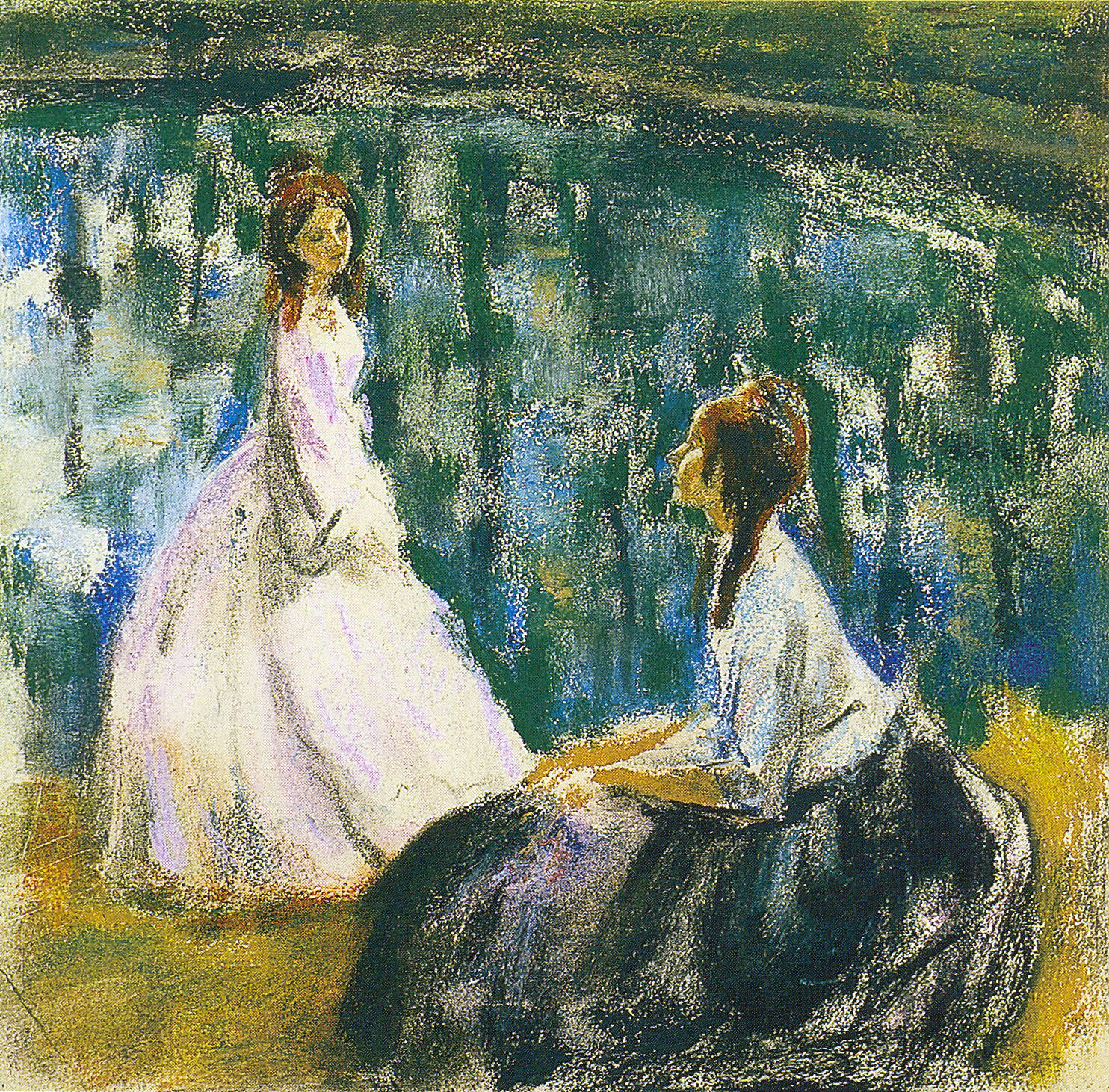
The Pool. Sketch

The most famous painting of that time is The Pool, 1902. The painting depicts two most important women in his life: his sister, Yelena Musatova and his bride (later wife), artist Yelena Alexandrova. The people are woven into the landscape of Zubrilovka estate with its old park and pond.

Another famous painting is The Phantoms. 1903 depicting ghosts on the steps of an old country manor. The painting was praised by the contemporary Symbolist poets Valery Bryusov and Andrey Bely.

In 1904 Borisov-Musatov had a very successful solo exhibition in a number of cities in Germany, and in the spring of 1905 he exhibited with Salon de la Société des Artistes Français and became a member of this society.

The last finished painting of Borisov-Musatov was Requiem. Devoted to the memory of Nadezhda Staniukovich, a close friend of the artist, the painting may indicate Borisov-Musatov's evolution towards the Neo-classical style.

Borisov-Musatov died on October 26, O.S. 1905 of a heart attack and is buried on a bank of Oka River near Tarusa. On his tomb there is a sculpture of a sleeping boy by Musatov's follower Alexander Matveyev.

== More selected works ==
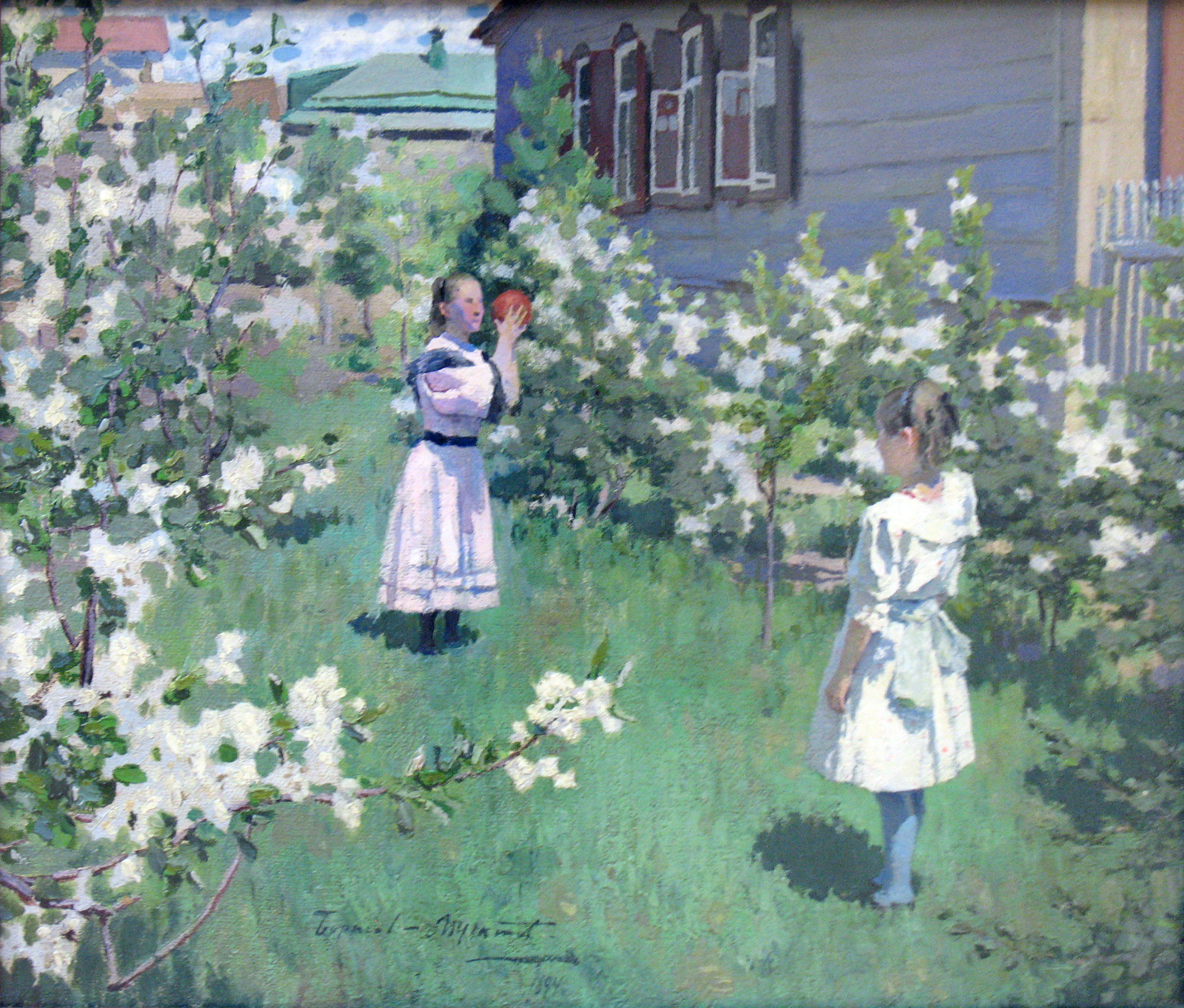
May Flowers, 1894

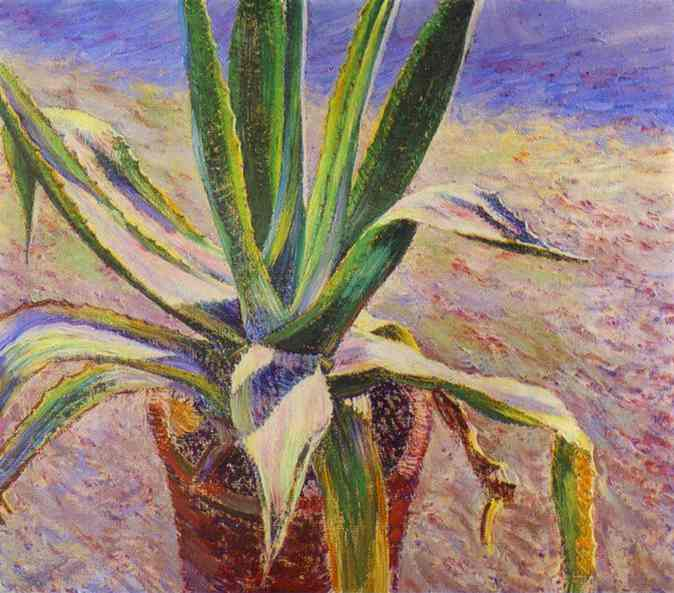
Agave, 1897

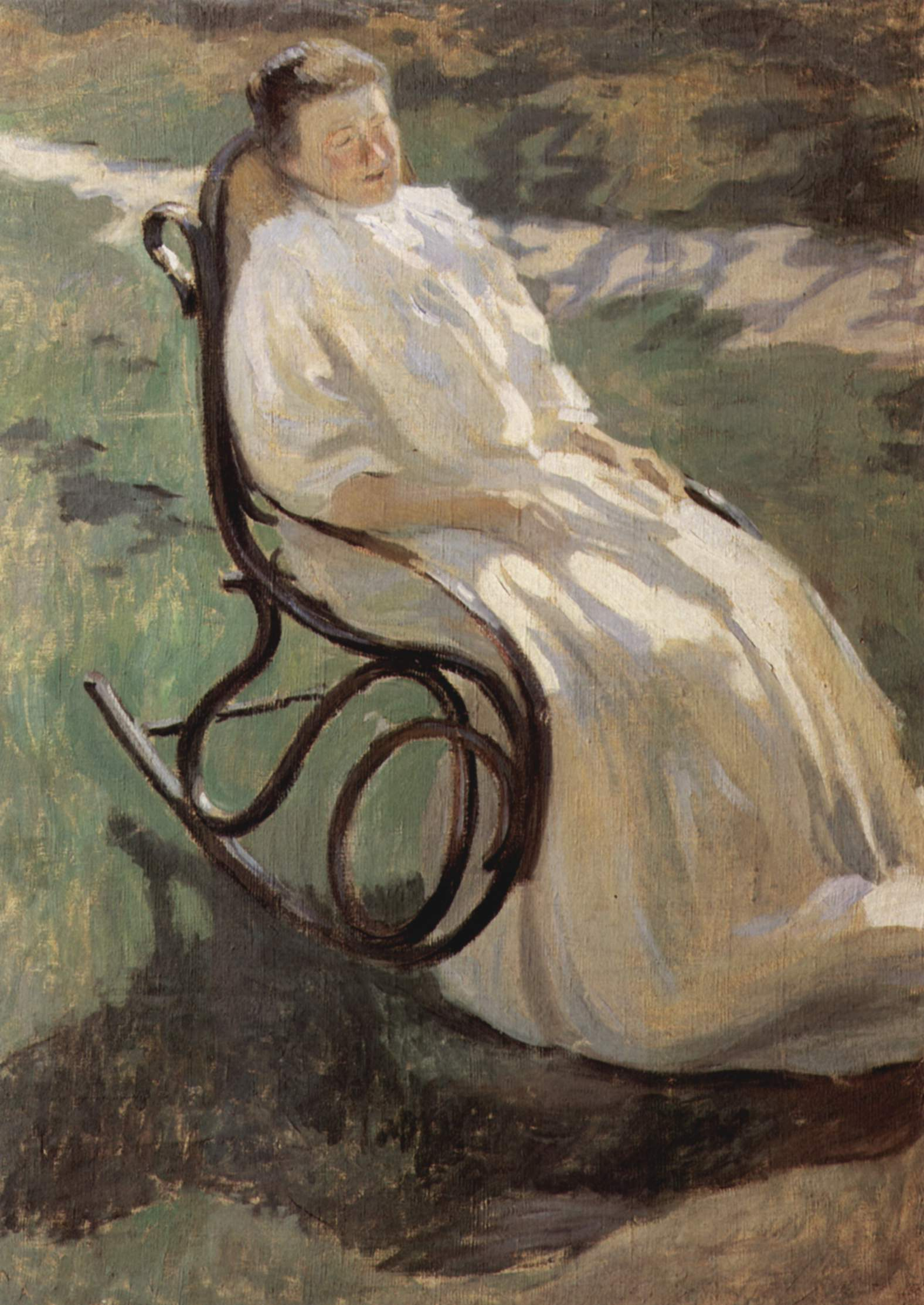
Lady in a Rocking Chair, 1897

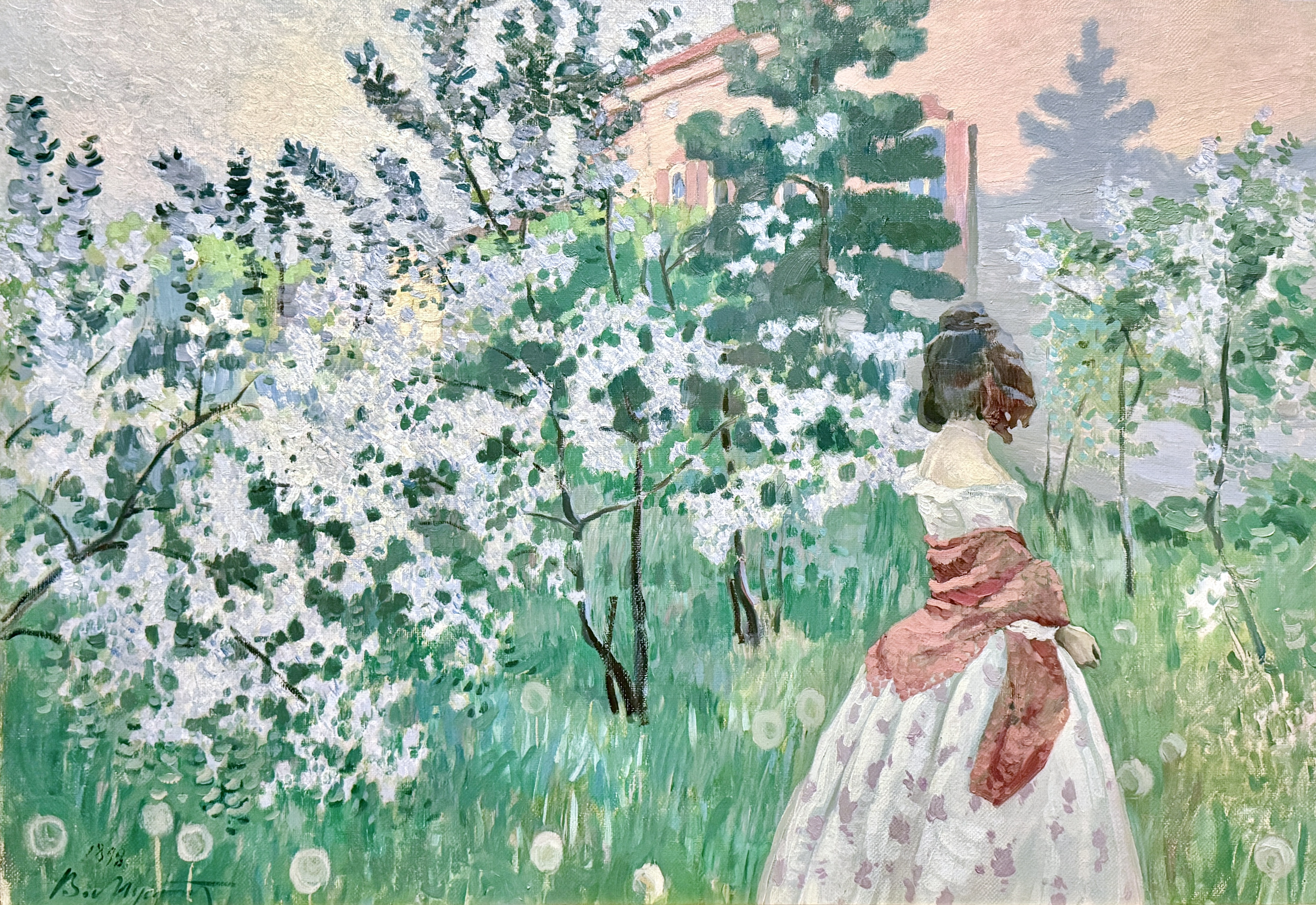
Spring, 1898-1901

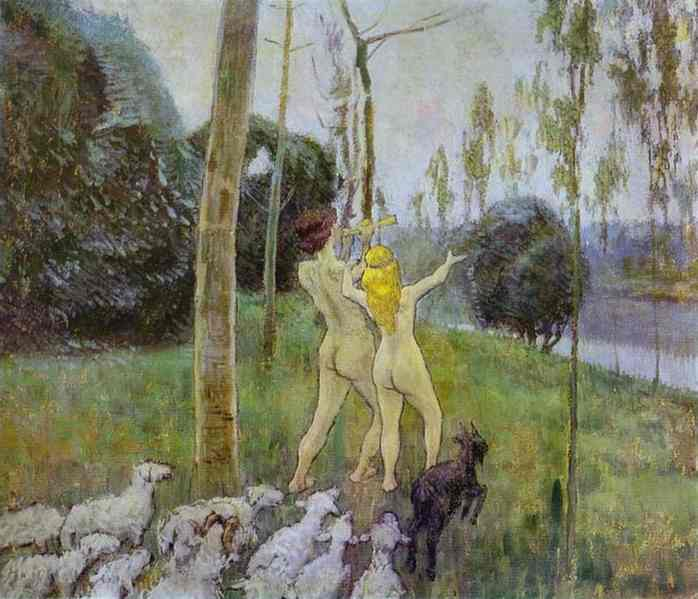
Daphnis and Chloe, 1901

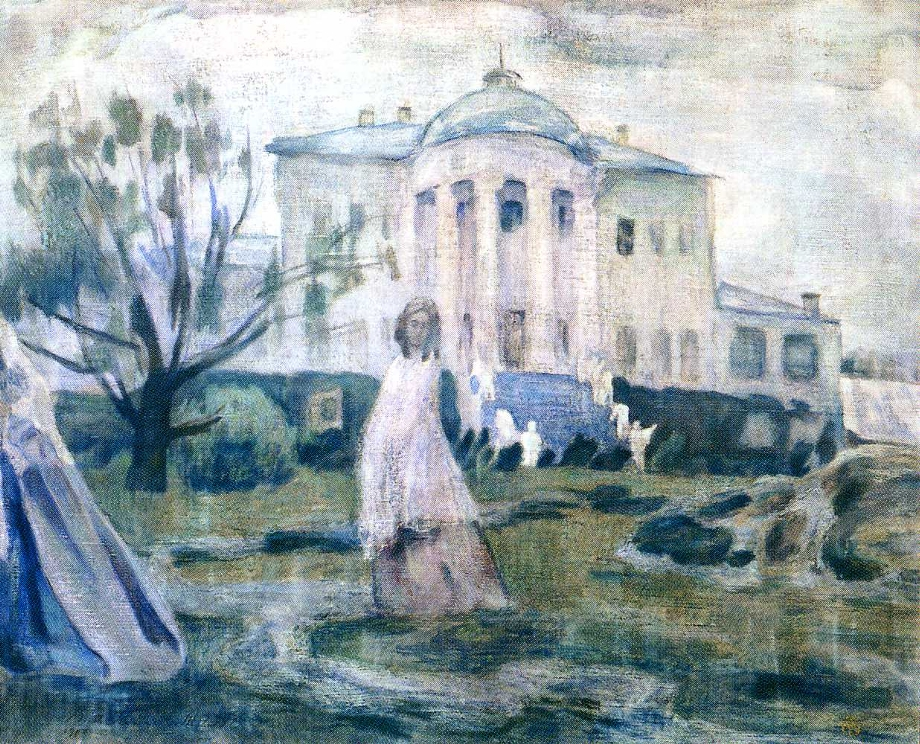
Phantoms, 1903

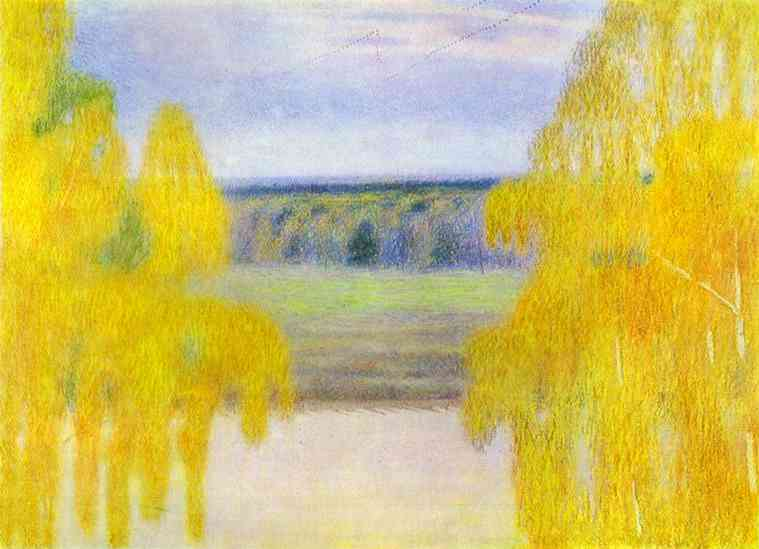
Autumn Song. 1905

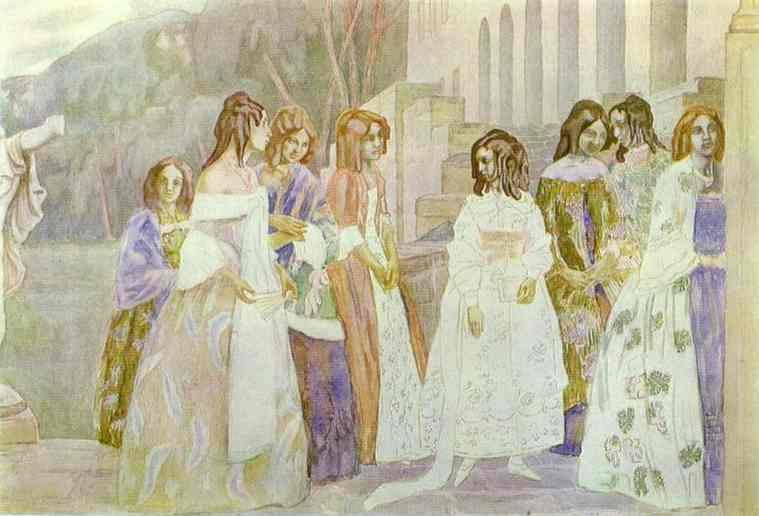
Requiem. 1905

== See also ==
- List of Russian artists
