= Shilovka =

Shilovka Шиловка
- Village
- Location within Vologda Oblast Location within Russia
- Coordinates: 58°54′N 38°27′E
- Country: Russia
- Region: Vologda Oblast
- District: Cherepovetsky District
- Time zone: UTC+3:00

Shilovka (Russian: Шиловка) is a rural locality (a village) in Yugskoye Rural Settlement, Cherepovetsky District, Vologda Oblast, Russia. The population was 13 as of 2010.

== Geography ==
The distance to Cherepovets is 57 km, to Novoye Domozerovo is 24 km. Musora is the nearest rural locality.
