= Sleeping Venus =

Sleeping Venus may refer to:

- Sleeping Venus (Carracci), a c. 1603 painting by Annibale Carracci
- Sleeping Venus (Delvaux), a 1944 painting by Paul Delvaux
- Sleeping Venus (Giorgione), a 1510 painting by Giorgione and Titian
- Sleeping Venus with Cupid (Poussin), a 1630 painting by Nicolas Poussin
- Venus and Cupid (Gentileschi) a c. 1626 painting by Artemisia Gentileschi, known also as Sleeping Venus
