= Iskusstvo kommuny =

- Editor: Osip Brik, Nathan Altman and Nikolay Punin
- Publisher: IZO-Narkompros
- First issue: December 7, 1918; 106 years ago
- Final issue Number: April 13, 1919; 19
- Country: Russia
- Based in: Petrograd
- Language: Russian

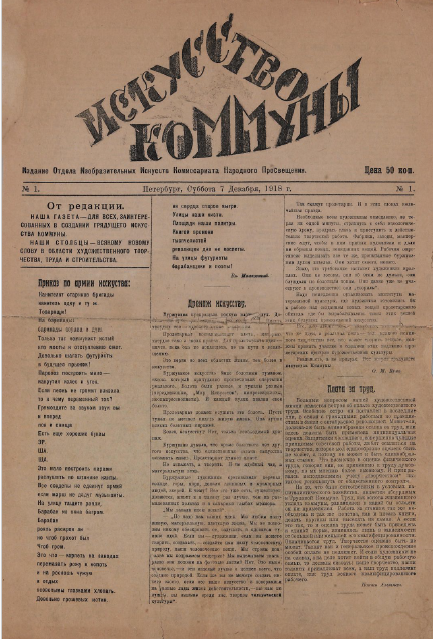
The first issue of art journal "Art of Commune" (Iskusstvo Kommuny), Early Soviet Russia. Dec 1918

Iskusstvo kommuny (Art of the Commune – IK) was a Russian arts magazine published by IZO-Narkompros. It was edited by Osip Brik, Nathan Altman and Nikolay Punin who produced nineteen issues between 7 December 1918 and April 1919. Each issue had between four and six pages and contained reviews, arts news, as well as poems and essays.

The magazine was based in Petrograd, and was one of the most important publications advocating the Russian futurist views on art. Iskusstvo was a sister paper. also published under the auspices of IZO-Narkompros, but in Moscow.

Osip Brik wrote in the first issue: “The bourgeoisie transformed flesh into spirit. It turned matter into a gaseous state. Instead of solids — ideological evaporations. The proletariat re-establishes flesh, matter, solids in its right. For the proletariat an idea is nothing if it is not realised, if it is not on the way to being realised.”

Some of the editorials were poems by Mayakovsky as "poetic editorials".
