= Aleksandr Matveyev (sculptor) =

Russian sculptor

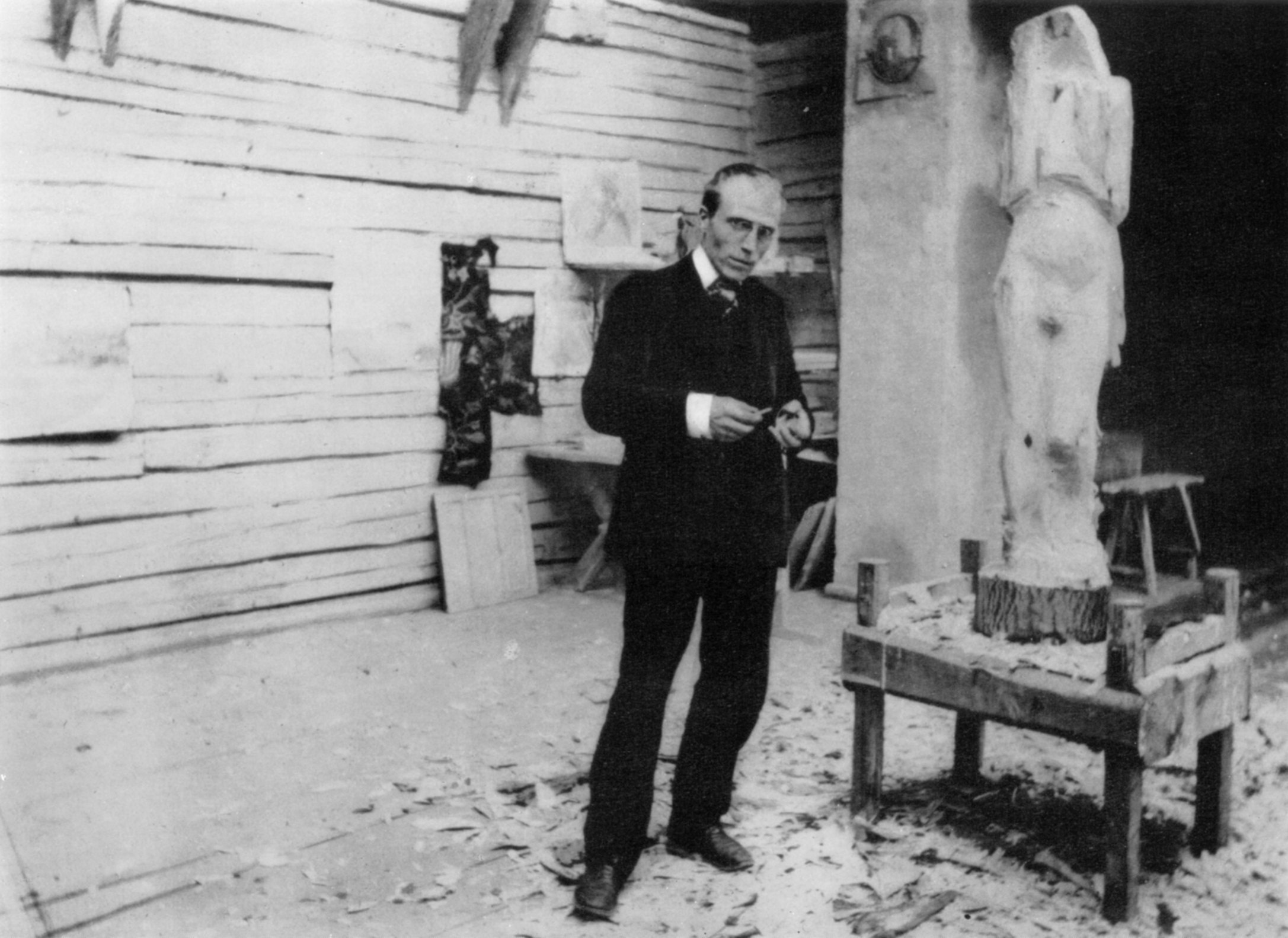
- Born: Aleksandr Terentyevich Matveyev; August 25, 1878; Saratov, Russian Empire
- Died: October 22, 1960 (aged 82); Moscow, Soviet Union
- Resting place: Novodevichy Cemetery
- Education: Bogolyubov Saratov Art School; Moscow School of Painting, Sculpture and Architecture
- Known for: Sculpture, painting
- Notable work: The Sleeping Boy, the tombstone to Victor Borisov-Musatov, 1910–1911

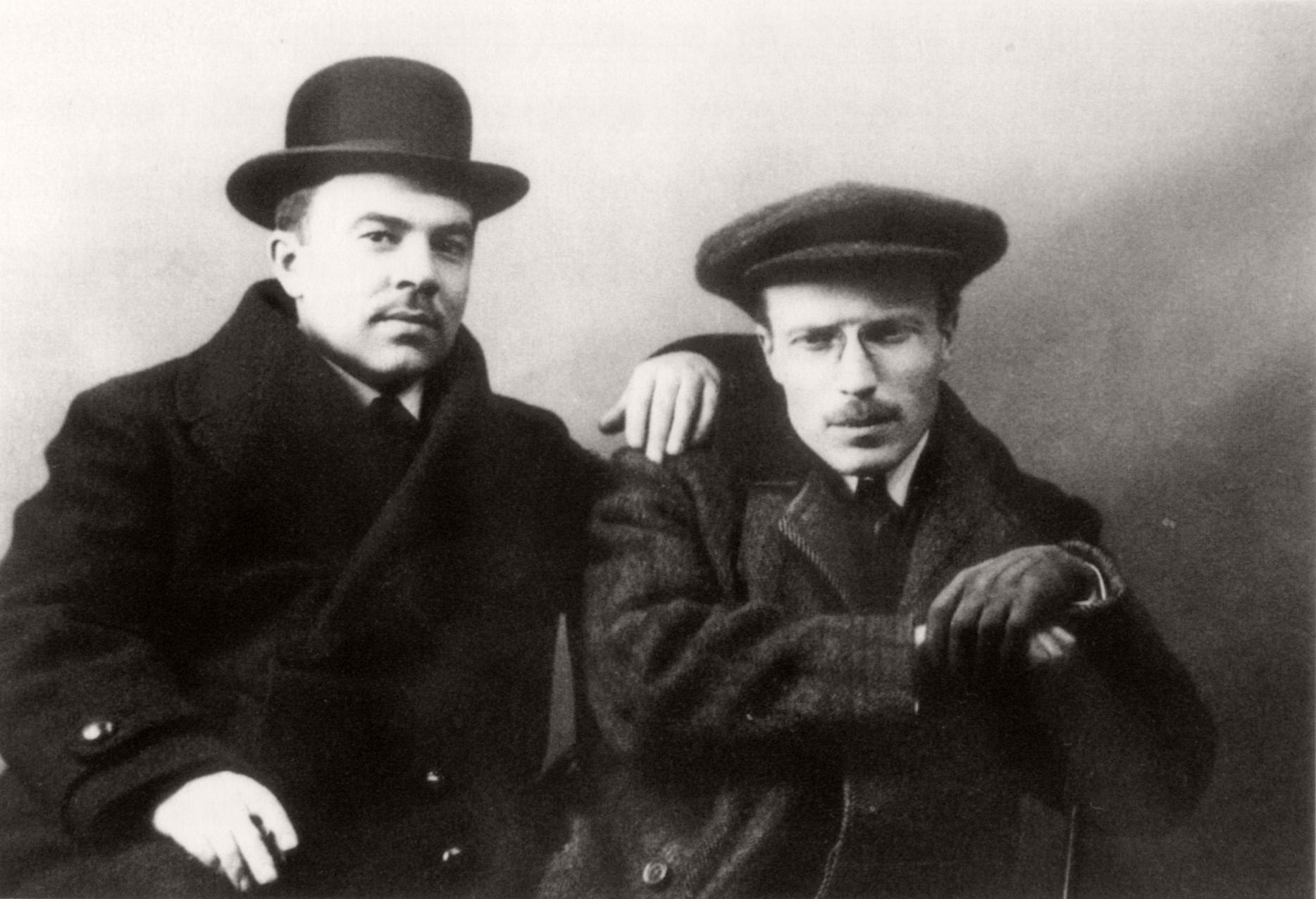
Pavel Kuznetsov and Aleksandr Matveyev.

Aleksandr Terentyevich Matveyev (Russian: Александр Терентьевич Матвеев; 25 August 1878 – 22 October 1960) was one of the leading Russian sculptors of his generation, working in a simple, vigorous, modern classical style similar to Aristide Maillol of France. He was one of the members of the art association ‘The Four Arts’, which existed in Moscow and Leningrad in 1924-1931.

== Biography ==
In 1941, following the outbreak of the Great Patriotic War, together with professors and students of the Academy of Arts he evacuated to Moscow and then to Samarkand; before leaving for Central Asia, he took part in an exhibition of the best works of Soviet artists. In 1942, while in Samarkand, he worked on a project for a monument to Alisher Navoi. In 1944 he moved to Zagorsk. In connection with the 25th anniversary of his pedagogical activity, he was awarded the Order of the Red Banner of Labour. Participates in the competition for the right to create a monument to Maria Yermolova. In 1945 he participated in the competition for projects of a monument to Chekhov and created a portrait of the writer and a model of the monument. In 1946 he was awarded the Medal "For Valiant Labour in the Great Patriotic War 1941–1945". He participated in the development of projects for the monument to Lermontov where he fashioned a portrait and created two versions of the layout of the monument. Participates in the All-Union Exhibition in Moscow. In 1948 he was subjected to harsh criticism from the leaders of the "social cultural propaganda", as not corresponding in their pedagogical methods to the "education of artists of the society building socialism". The initiators of another repressive ideological campaign, in this case, first of all, Yevgeny Vuchetich and Zair Azgur, freed Soviet culture from "foreign elements". The sculptor was forced to leave teaching. In 1960 he was a delegate of the I Congress of the Union of Artists of the RSFSR in Moscow. On October 22, 1960 he died and was buried at the Novodevichy Cemetery. In 1989, a memorial plaque was installed at the house on 29 Lieutenant Schmidt Embankment in Saint Petersburg where he lived.

As an artist of international reputation, he was made a leader of the Soviet sculptor's union until the 1950s when the younger practitioners of socialist realism finally replaced him. He was also a teacher for many years at the Academy of Arts of the USSR and the Moscow School of Painting, Sculpture and Architecture where he had studied as a young man. One of his students was the Latvian Kārlis Zāle.

== Works ==
- One of his works, a group made up of three nude figures (apart from the Red Army hat on one of them a worker, a peasant and a Red Army soldier, entitled "October 1927" was placed in front of the Oktyabrsky Concert Hall in 1968. It is cast from bronze in 1968 from the original, created in 1927.
