= Bilibin =

Bilibin (masculine, Russian: Били́бин) or Bilibina (feminine, Russian: Били́бина) is a Russian surname. Notable people with the surname include:

- Ivan Bilibin (1876–1942), Russian illustrator and stage designer
- Maria Chambers-Bilibin (1874–1962), Russian–English illustrator and graphic artist
- Viktor Bilibin (1859–1908), Russian writer and playwright
- Yuri Alexandrovich Bilibin (1901–1952), Russian geologist
