= Renée O'Connell-Mikhailovskaya =

Russian-English artist (1891–1981)

- Рене Рудольфовна О’Коннель-Михайловская
- Born: 1891
- Died: 1981 (aged 89–90)
- Education: Imperial Society for the Encouragement of the Arts (1907–1914)
- Known for: Porcelain artist
- Movement: Mir iskusstva
- Spouse: Sergei Nikolaevich Mikhailovsky (m. 1919; died 1927)
- Partner: Ivan Bilibin (1912–1917)
- Children: 2

Renée O'Connell-Mikhailovskaya (Russian: Рене Рудольфовна О’Коннель-Михайловская, romanized: Rene Rudolfovna O'Connell-Mikhailovskaya; 1891–1981) (née O'Connell), was a Russian porcelain artist, painter and graphic artist.

== Biography ==
O'Connell was born in 1891 in either Paris or St Petersburg to French expat and life insurance accountant Rodolphe Alfredovich O'Connell and Olga Metro. She was claimed but never proved to be from the family of Frédérique Émilie Auguste O'Connell, or the granddaughter of Daniel O'Connell.

In her youth, she studied in Andrei Afanasievich Egorov's studio.

O'Connell studied at the School of the Society for the Encouragement of the Arts from 1907. After graduating in 1914, she became a teacher at the school and worked principally in the field of ceramic art. She studied further abroad in Italy, France, Germany and Hungary.

O'Connell had many connections in the circle of the Mir iskusstva movement, and her first paintings were heavily influenced by those artists, such as Alexandre Benois.

At the end of 1912, O'Connell entered a common law marriage with Mir iskusstva member Ivan Bilibin (although Bilibin was still legally married to his first wife, Maria Chambers). Bilibin was 15 years her senior, and together they travelled around the Crimean peninsula to draw.

The relationship struggled due to Bilibin's drinking. The couple entered an agreement, witnessed by their friend musician Stepan Stepanovich Mitusov, that if Bilibin did not drink for a year, then O'Connell would stay with him. Bilibin did not keep his word, and O'Connell left Bilibin in September 1917, with Bilibin travelling to Crimea alone following the events of the Russian Revolution.

Mitusov wrote a comic poem about the breakdown of the couple's relationship. (Note: Билъ и Бин друзьями были./ Ах, связал их тесно Р. О. К./ С колыбели вместе жили/ И друг друга так любили,/ Что ни Билъ один не мог/ Жить без Бина, ниже Бин/ Быть без Биля день один./ Горький пьяница безбожник,/ Билъ - гуляка, весельчак,/ Бин - поэт, большой художник,/ И в музыке не сапожник./ Не могли они никак/ Рисовать без Биля Бин,/ Бин без Биля пить один./ Так друзьями вместе жили/ Билъ и Бин: связал их Р. О. К./ Рисовали, пели, пили/ И друг друга так любили,/ Что ни Билъ один не мог/ Жить без Бина, ниже Бин/ Быть без Биля день один.)

After her relationship with Bilibin had ended, O'Connell married mining engineer Sergei Nikolaevich Mikhailovsky. They had two children, a daughter and a son, and Mikhailovsky died in 1927.

From 1922 to 1932, O'Connell-Mikhailovskaya was engaged to the workshops of the Leningrad Porcelain Factory, where she worked as a porcelain artist. In 1928, O'Connell's work was exhibited at the Soviet Porcelain and Posters exhibition in Paris.

In 1932, O'Connell-Mikhailovskaya had a brief relationship with Daniil Kharms.

In 1941, O'Connell-Mikhailovskaya's last exhibition took place, where her paintings on porcelain and ceramics were mainly presented.

Due to her foreign origin, O'Connell-Mikhailovskaya was exiled to Siberia until 1953. She left her teenage son in the care of one her friends in Leningrad. As soon as the opportunity arose, she sent for her son to live with her in exile. However, during one of the stops on the train on the way to meet his mother, he drowned while swimming in a river.

O'Connell-Mikhailovskaya's daughter died during the Siege of Leningrad, as did her former partner Bilibin.

While in exile, O'Connell-Mikhailovskaya married a German doctor.

In the late 1940s and early 1950, O'Connell-Mikhailovskaya worked at ZIK.

O'Connell-Mikhailovskaya died in 1981.
