= Krymov =

Krymov, female Krymova (Russian: Крымов) may refer to one of the following:

- Nikolay Krymov (1884—1958), Russian painter and art theoritican
- Aleksandr Krymov, Russian general of World War I and Russian Revolution times
- Yury Krymov
