= Boris Anisfeld =

Russian-American painter and stage designer (1878–1973)

- Борис Анисфельд
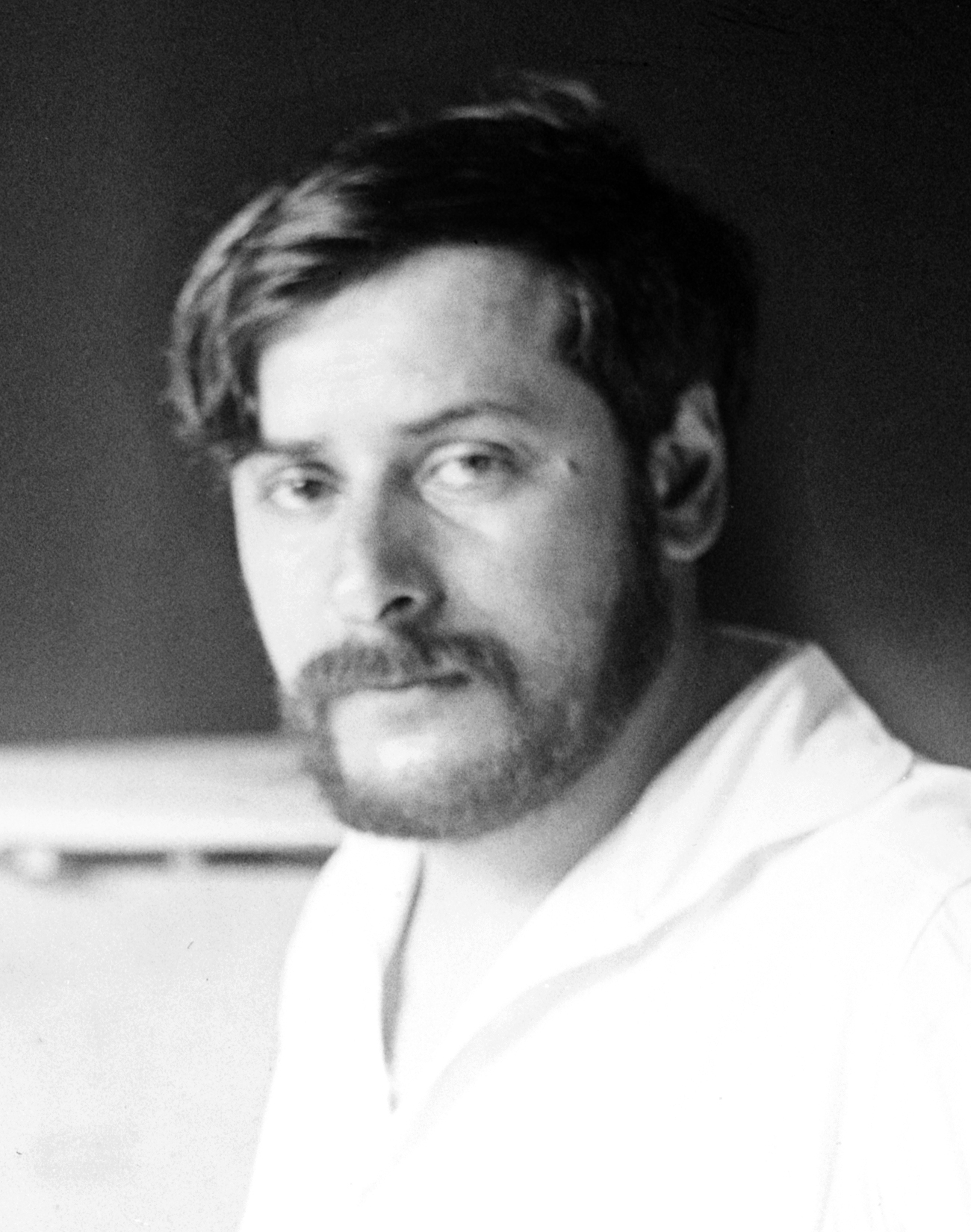
- Anisfeld c. 1920
- Born: October 14, 1878; Beltsy, Bessarabia Governorate, Russian Empire
- Died: December 4, 1973 (aged 95); Waterford, Connecticut, US
- Citizenship: American (from 1926)
- Education: Odesa Art School of Drawing; Imperial Academy of Arts
- Occupations: Painter; stage designer; graphic artist; professor
- Movement: Russian symbolism; Mir iskusstva
- Spouse: Frieda Glaeserman (m. 1904; died 1933)
- Children: 1

Boris Izrailevich Anisfeld (Note: Also anglicized as Boris Izrailevich Anisfel’d and Boris Israilovich Anisfeld.) (Russian: Борис Израилевич Анисфельд; October 14 [O.S. October 2] 1878 – December 4, 1973) was a Russian-American painter and draughtsman of Moldovan-Jewish origin. A representative of the Symbolist movement during what is known in Russian scholarship as the Silver Age, Anisfeld was particularly known for his designs for Ballets Russes.

== Biography ==
Boris Anisfeld, by Vasily Belyashin, 1904, etching; Russian Museum

Anisfeld was born on October 14 [O.S. October 2] 1878 in Beltsy, Bessarabia Governorate (present-day Bălți, Moldova) to Srul Ruvinovich Anisfeld, an estate manager, and Gitlya Istkovna Anisfeld. Until he is seventeen, the future artist lives in his parents’ home. He learns German and French.

1885 – Anisfeld learns to play the violin, and begins to take up drawing.

1895 – Anisfeld enters the Odesa Art School of Drawing, where he studies with Kyriak Kostandi, at that time the leading teacher of portraiture and figure painting in Odessa. He meets Vladimir Izdebsky, Semyon Abugov, and David Burliuk.

1900 – Anisfeld enters the Imperial Academy of Arts in St. Petersburg. His first teacher was Pavel Kovalevsky, a painter of battle pictures.

1901 – Due to poor health (according to a medical certificate), Anisfeld takes a leave of absence, and spends the summer in Odessa.

1902 – Anisfeld transfers to Ilya Repin's class, which Repin's assistant Dmitry Kardovsky directs after 1903. (In 1907, Kardovsky became a teacher of genre and portrait painting). Anisfeld takes a room on the Petersburg Side, at Bolshaya Spasskaya Street, number 15, apt. 23. He shares the room with Aleksandr Savinov, who also studying with Kardovsky. Although he studied under Repin, his drawings gravitated more towards the symbolism of Mikhail Vrubel.

1903 – The academy's Advisory Council denies Anisfeld a one-time grant of financial aid. Yet twice – in March and December – his sketches are praised.

1904 – The Council decides to give Anisfeld a one-time grant. With the understanding of the academy that he will apply himself to his art studies, Anisfeld spends the summer traveling around Russia-and also every summer thereafter, until 1909. In December, he marries Frieda Glaeserman, the daughter of a Pskov merchant. She, apparently, had been taking art lessons with Anisfeld.

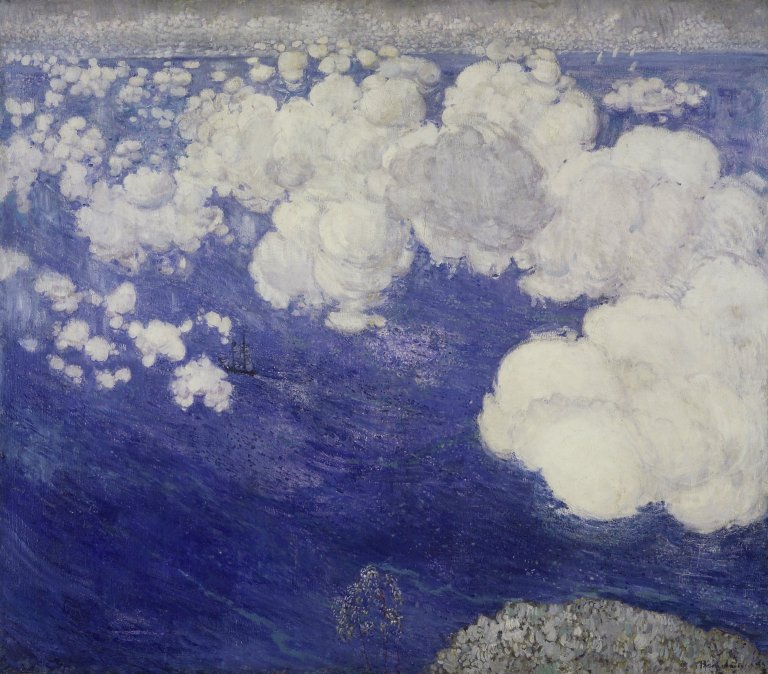
Clouds over the Black Sea - Crimea (1906), Brooklyn Museum

1905 – Igor Grabar ‘discovers’ the young painter, and introduces him to S. P. Diaghilev. Anisfeld joins a circle of artists who are close to The World of Art group. That summer, he and his wife travel along the Neva and the Western Dvina, and then via the Dnepr to Crimea, where they spend some time in Gurzuf, and meet Maxim Gorky.

1905–06 – Anisfeld does illustrations for the satirical journals Zhupel (Bugbear), Adskaya Pochta, and V. L. Burtsyev's Calendar of the Russian Revolution.

1906 – Anisfeld stays in Paris in January and February. For the first time, he participates in exhibitions of the Union of Russian Artists, in Moscow, and of the World of Art in Petersburg. One of his watercolors, Flowers is acquired by the Tretyakov Gallery. Anisfeld is now living on Vasilevsky Island, Bol’shoi Prospekt, number 8/4, apt 34. Diaghilev organizes an exhibit of Russian art at the Paris Salon d’Automne. Anisfeld is a participant, and is one of six Russian artists chosen as Societaires. Diaghilev's exhibition is continued in Berlin, at the Kunstsalon Schulte. Together with L. Bakst and M. Dobushinsky, Anisfeld teaches at A. Zvansteva's art school. I. A. Repin supports Anisfelds's request to the Advisory Council of the academy, for permission to travel abroad for half a year. He apparently uses only two or three months.

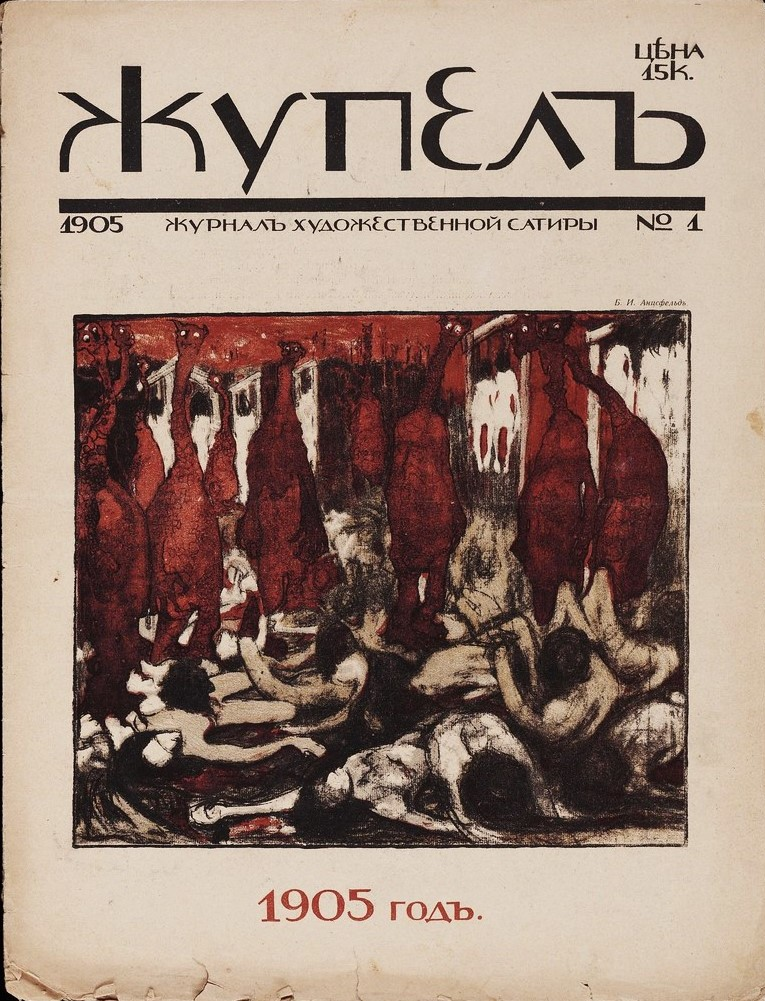
No. 1 issue of Zhupel, cover art by Anisfeld

1907 – The Russian Exhibition from the Salon d’ Automne is shown in a drastically abbreviated form in Venice. Anisfeld spends several months in the south of Russia for reasons of health. He finishes his courses at the Higher Art School of the Imperial Academy, and is granted a year to produce his graduation painting. Anisfeld undertakes his first work for the theater: the sets for Hugo von Hofmannsthal’s Marriage of Zobeide, at V. F. Kommissarzhevskaya’s theater on Ofitserskaya Street, V. E. Meyerhold directing. In the Fall, Anisfeld works for the first time for Diaghilev’s Russian Seasons, executing A. Ya. Golovin’s designs for Boris Godunov in cooperation with Ye. Ye. Lancere, K. F. Yuon and S. P. Yaremich.

1908 – Anisfeld works for the satirical journal Satyricon, and participates in a number of exhibitions: the Fall exhibition of the Higher Art School of the Imperial Academy, and an exhibition in Vienna at the Vienna Secession. In December, the Council of the Academy rejects his graduation painting Danaë, and allows him to submit another painting in the following year. The Anisfelds’ daughter Morella is born.

1909 – Anisfeld receives permission from the academy to go abroad, and spends April in Paris, where he shares a studio with S. Yaremich. As an executor of sets for Diaghilev's Russian Seasons, he spends a few weeks in Paris every Spring until 1912. In the Fall, Anisfeld submits Adam and Eve to the Advisory Council of the academy as his graduation piece. In October, the Council of the academy again refuses to grant him his degree. Only after the vehement protests of some of the academy's teachers, a campaign of support for the artist in the press, and the personal intervention of the President of the academy, the Grand Duchess Maria Pavlovna, does the Advisory Council reverse its decision. Anisfeld is graduated in Jan. 1910.

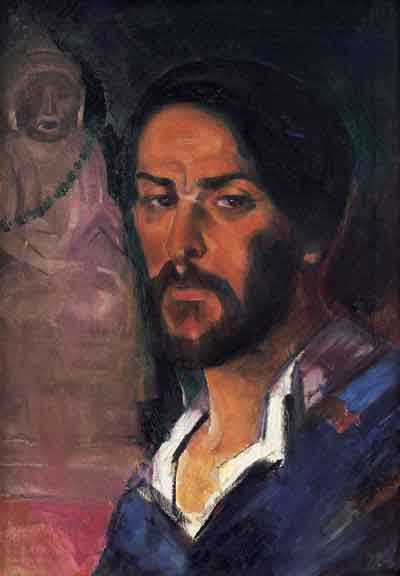
Self-portrait, 1910s

1910 – P. I. Chaikovsky's ballet The Four Seasons, staged by the pupils of the Imperial School of Choreography at their annual review on March 26, is apparently the first collaborative project of Anisfeld and Fokine. Anisfeld executes Bakst's designs for Sheherezade in Paris, and spends the summer in Concarneau in Brittany.

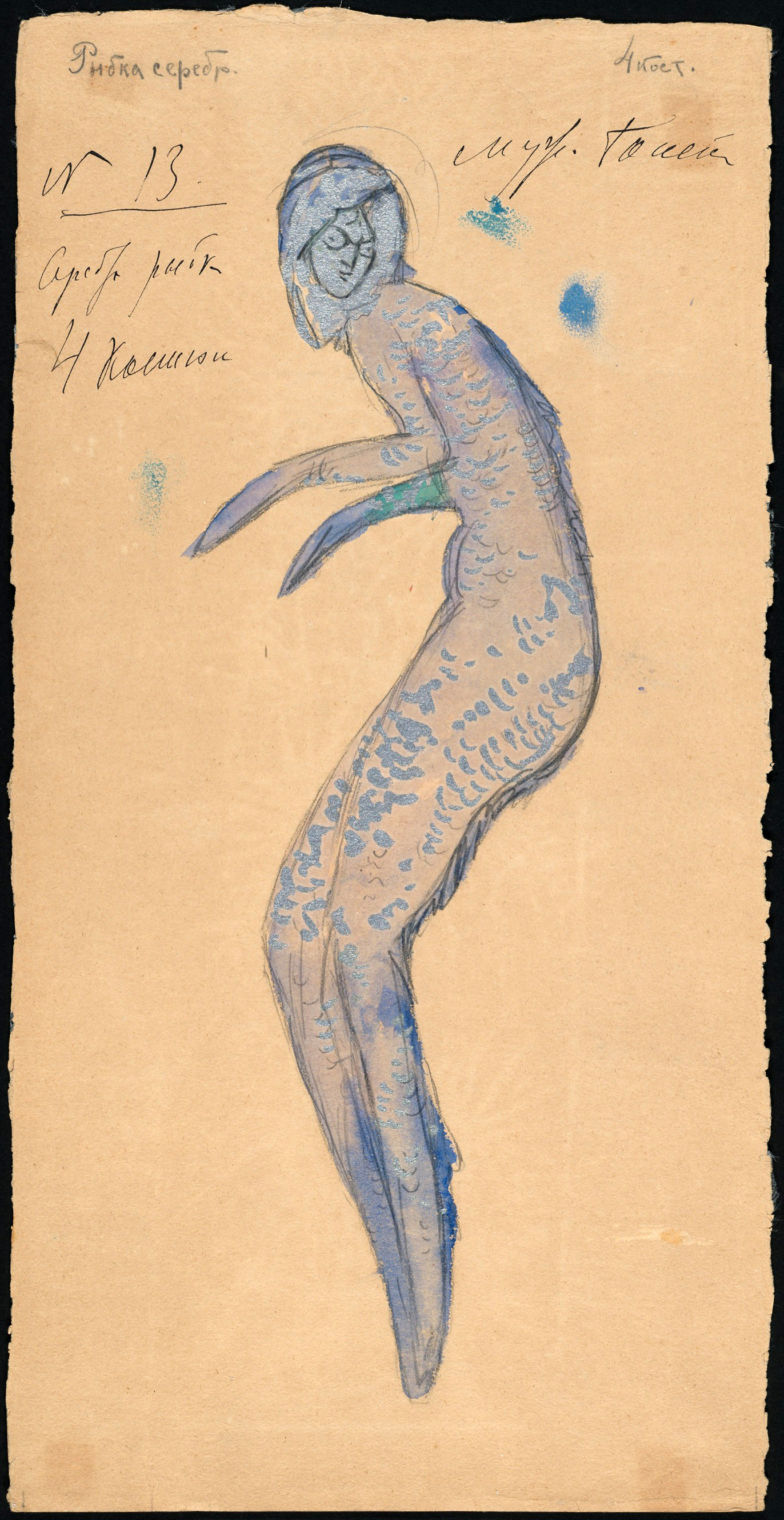
Anisfeld's costume design for Silver fish, 1911 (pencil, watercolor and silver paint)

1911 – During the winter, Anisfeld executes A. N. Benois’ designs for Petrushka, and that Spring, in Rome and Paris, he creates the sets and costumes for The Undersea Kingdom. This is the only design work for Diaghilev's Russian Ballet which is entirely his own. He spends the summer in Capri. The New York Metropolitan Opera buys Anisfeld's sets for Boris Godunov from the Paris Grand Opera. On Nov. 29, Anisfeld signs a contract with the management of the Imperial Theatres for the execution of sets and costumes for Islamey. The work is to be completed not later than Jan. 15, 1912.

1911–1913 – Anisfeld attends D. A. Kiplik's newly established workshop for pictorial materials and technique, at the Imperial Academy. He studies fresco technique.

1912 – After Fokine breaks from Diaghilev, Anisfeld reaches an understanding with Fokin to design his productions for 1913. The artist spends the summer in Gris am Brenner in the Tyrol, and the winter-with Fokine-in Berlin and Stockholm. While in Petersburg, he lives on Vasilevsky Island, Sredny Prospekt, number 3/15, apt. 14.

1913 – On Mar. 13, Anisfeld signs a contract with the management of the Imperial Theaters to design the sets and costumes for Liszt's Les Preludes. The work is to be completed on Mar. 13. He spends the summer in Hendaye, France, San Sebastián, Spain, and in Millstatt in the Austrian Alps. Anisfeld takes an apartment at No.7 Geislerovsky Pereulok, 6-on the Petersburg Side. This is to be his final address in Petersburg.

1914 – In Feb. and Mar. Anisfeld is in London, where he creates sets and costumes for V. Nizhinsky's productions of L'Apres- midi d’un Faune, Les Sylphides and Le Spectre de la Rose, at the Palace Theater. The theater's fire brigade destroys the set for Faune. Liszt's Les Preludes is performed by Anna Pavlova's troupe on the stage of the Manhattan Opera. This is the first time that an American audience has seen Anisfeld's theater work. The artist spends the summer in Venice, takes part in the Baltic Exhibition in Malmö, Sweden, and returns to Petersburg through Finland at the outbreak of the War. In Petersburg, he is commissioned to paint murals in the villa of the wife of the banker A. M. Wourgaft, on Kamenny Ostrov (Stony Island) Some time that year or possibly a little later, he has preliminary discussions with the Jousupoffs about decorative work in their Fontanka palace.

1915 – Anisfeld becomes a member of the Jewish Society for the Encouragement of the Arts, and participates in a number of charitable auctions for the support of needy artists and other social groups.

1916 – Anisfeld makes a trip to Bilbao, Spain, in connection with a staging of The Undersea Kingdom. He paints a portrait of Feodor Chaliapin.

1917 – In August, Anisfeld gets an exemption from military service. He completes at least eight major paintings for an exhibition at the Brooklyn Museum, receives an export permit for his paintings, and leaves Petrograd with his wife and daughter in Sept. His route takes him to Vladivostok, to Yokohama, thence to Vancouver and across Canada to New York. The artist is already acquainted with the New York impresario Max Rabinov. In Petrograd, S. Abugov manages to safeguard Anisfeld's apartment and studio for some time.

1918 – Anisfeld arrives in New York with a letter of recommendation from V. D. Nabokov, the editor of the Petrograd paper Ryech, and a collector of Anisfeld's theater sketches, addressed to Herman Bernstein, the New York publicist and translator of M. Gorky and L. Andreev. An exhibition of Anisfelds's works is mounted at the Brooklyn Museum. Christian Brinton, a connoisseur of Russian art, is the organizer. The exhibition, which in the course of two years, will travel to several major American cities, sets off a lively discussion about the merits of his art.

1919 – Anisfeld signs a contract with the Kingore Gallery in New York on Dec. 20. On Dec. 27, the Metropolitan Opera's premiere of The Blue Bird, with sets and costumes by Anisfeld, is celebrated at a ball in the Waldorf Astoria presided over by Mrs. W. K. Vanderbilt, who initiated a so-called Campaign for Happiness.

1921 – The Association of Russian and Ukrainian artists organizes an auction of the works of Anisfeld and Roerich at the Plaza Hotel on May 28. Sergei Prokofiev's opera The Love for Three Oranges, with sets and costumes by Anisfeld, premieres at the Chicago Civic Opera. The reviews are mixed, but Anisfeld's sets are highly praised.

1922 – Rimsky-Korsakov's opera The Snow Maiden (Snegourochka), with sets and costumes by Anisfeld, opens at the Metropolitan Opera, and is a great success. Max Rabinov conceives of a project to establish an institute for the performing arts at Stony Point New York, with Anisfeld, S. Sudeikin, L. Bakst and Iu. Urban as collaborators.

1923 – Anisfeld joins the Scene Painters Union, along with Norman Bel Geddes.

1925 – Anisfeld executes the sets and costumes for a children's pantomime The Magic Night. It is performed five times at the Garrick Theater in New York.

1926 – Anisfeld becomes an American citizen. He wins a gold medal from the Philadelphia exposition for his painting Hispania, and designs costumes for two productions of Mikhail Mordkin's Russian Ballet. The Metropolitan Opera declines to accept his costumes and set designs for a production of Turandot. With Max Rabinov acting as an intermediary, Anisfeld conducts negotiations about a possible project with the Mexico City Opera.

1928 – Anisfeld moves to Chicago with his wife and daughter. After some time in a residential hotel, Anisfeld and his family move to an apartment building on Ohio Street. That summer, the artist undertakes an automobile trip around the American South West. He visits Santa Fe, Taos, and Southern Colorado.

1928–1958 – Anisfeld frequently spends the summers in the Western US. (Colorado and New Mexico)

From 1928 – Anisfeld is a professor of advanced drawing and painting at the School of the Art Institute of Chicago.

1930 – A fire at a warehouse in Stony Point NY destroys the sets for The Snow Maiden and Love of Three Oranges.

1933 – Anisfeld's wife commits suicide. His daughter, Morella Borisovna Anisfeld, buys him a house in Central City Colorado.

1934–1965 – The artist teaches painting there to a small group of students most summers. This is the so-called "Boris Anisfeld School of Painting". He lives in Old Town Chicago, at the same location from the mid thirties almost until his death, at the Kogen Apartments, a purpose-built apartment/ studio complex for artists known as Carl Street Studios, established by artists Sol Kogen and Edgar Miller.

1958 – The Art Institute organizes a retrospective exhibition of Anisfeld's works, at the insistence of his former students. Anisfeld's name returns from oblivion. The New York Times publishes a short biographical piece about him.

== Personal life ==
On December 4, 1973 Anisfeld died in Waterford, Connecticut aged 95.
