= Irina Grjebine =

Russian ballet dancer (1907–1994)

Irina Grjebine (1907–1994) was a Russian ballet dancer who worked at the Opéra russe à Paris and who later established a school of choreography and her own Russian Ballet company.

She was the daughter of Zinovii Grzhebin, a Russian publisher based in St Petersburg. With her sister Lya, she was trained in ballet by Ivan Koussov, Nicolas Legat and Olga Preobrajenska.
