= Clouds over the Black Sea - Crimea =

1906 symbolist painting by Boris Anisfeld

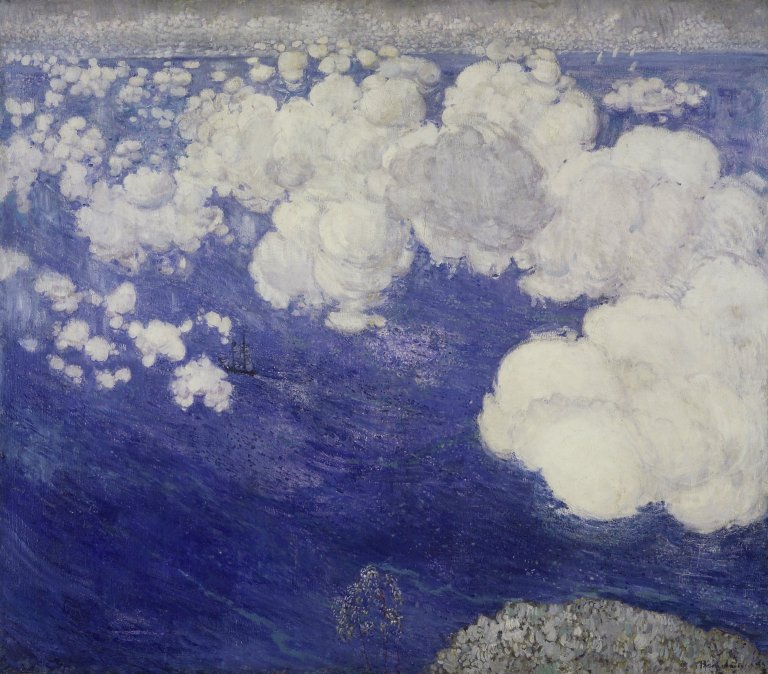
- Artist: Boris Izrailevich Anisfeld
- Year: 1906
- Catalogue: P 150
- Medium: Oil on canvas
- Movement: Russian symbolism
- Subject: View of the Black Sea from Ayu-Dag, Crimea, Ukraine
- Dimensions: 125.7 cm × 142.2 cm (49.5 in × 56 in)
- Location: Brooklyn Museum, Brooklyn
- Accession: 33.416
- Website: https://www.brooklynmuseum.org/objects/4705

Clouds over the Black Sea - Crimea is a 1906 oil on canvas painting by Moldovan-American artist Boris Anisfeld. The painting is in a symbolist style and depicts a cloudscape view of the Black Sea from the Ayu-Dag mountains in the Crimea, from where Anisfeld situated himself to get a bird's eye view of the expanse while he painted. Considered a prominent piece of pre-October Revolution Russian symbolist art, it is kept on display at the Brooklyn Museum.

== Inspiration ==
In 1901, after graduating at the Imperial Academy of Arts, Anisfeld spent his leave of absence in Odessa. During 1906, he made multiple trips to the Neva, Western Dvina, and the Dnieper, painting landscapes and developing his tehnique in the Blue Rose style of symbolism.

Anisfeld took his cues from nature:

In painting I think in colour first. I paint what I think, not always what I see. In summer I paint only from nature and try to express my impressions of nature in all her phases. I do not always paint the colour another might see, but only what my impression of the scene is at the time. My moods vary, and I paint the scene before me to correspond with my mood of the moment.

During these 1906 trips he painted Clouds over the Black Sea - Crimea, scoping the Black Sea from the summit of the Crimean mountain of Ayu-Dag, yet the painting it is placed as if on midair, imagining a height above the clouds from where he stood. The clouds extend to the distant horizon giving depth and dimension, however, Anisfeld—in the symbolist style—instead merges the sky and sea onto a flat single plane, which is divergent from more realist style. Some of peak of Ayu-Dag is shown on the lower right, while a warship and sailboats are dotted across the sea.

== Exhibition ==
The painting debuted at the 1906 Salon d'Automne in Paris in an exhibition organized by Sergei Diaghilev, who Anisfeld collaborated with for stage sets and costumes. The painting was part of an additional exhibition in Berlin in 1906, Moscow in 1907–8, St. Petersberg in 1908, and Vienna in 1908. In 1917, after the Russian Revolution, Anisfeld fled to the United States, and within a year had his American debut at the Brooklyn Museum in 1918, who helped with his emigration via export permit for his works. The painting was in an exhibition in Worcester, Massachusetts in 1924, followed by Boston from 1924–5. Following the suicide of his wife Frieda Glaeserman in 1933, he donated the work in memory of her to the Brooklyn Museum, where it has been in the permanent collection under 'Accession Number 33.416'.
