= Solomon Kopelman =

Russian publisher (1880–1944)

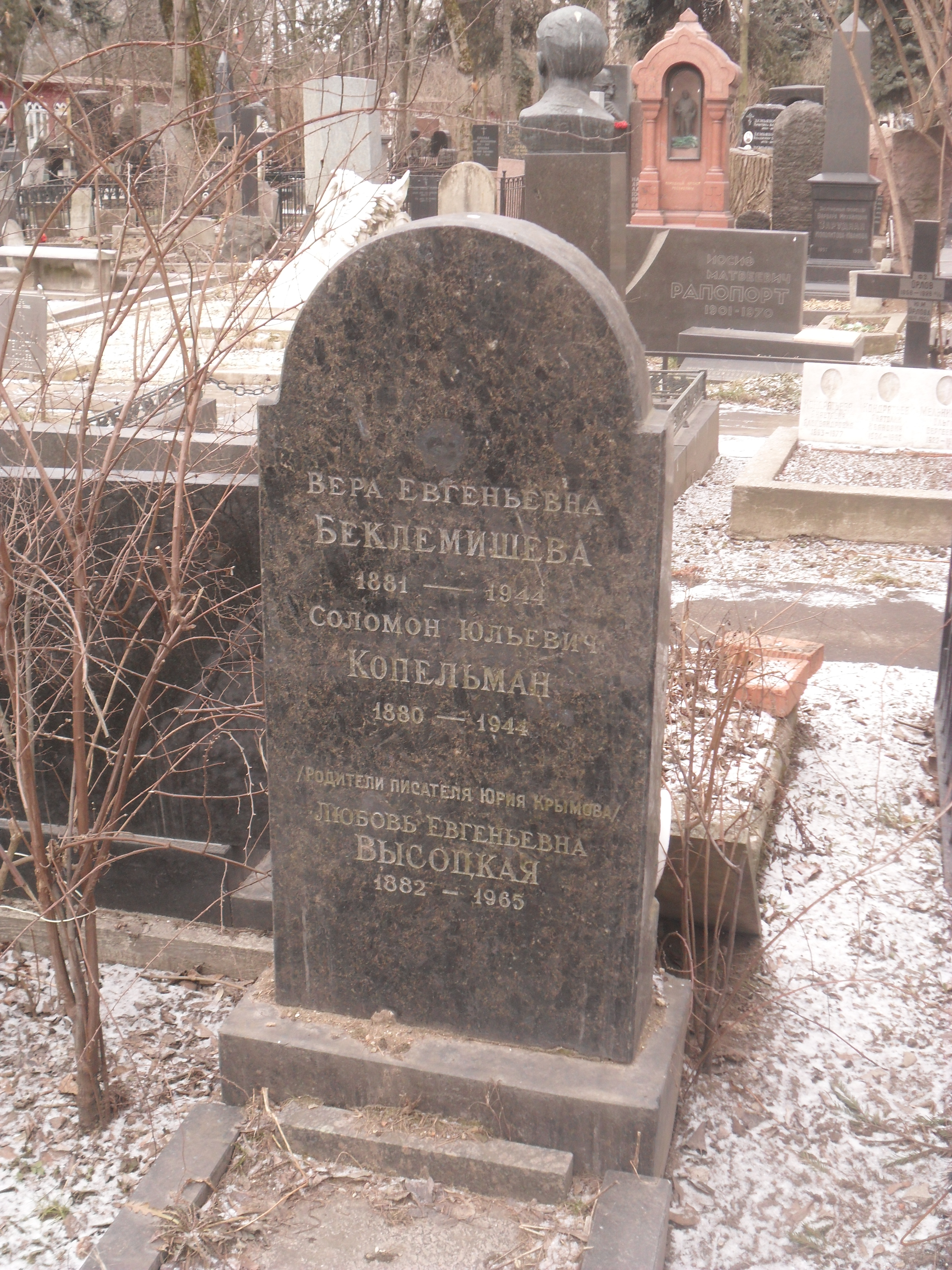
Kopelman's headstone in the Novodevichy Cemetery

Solomon Yuryevich Kopelman (1880 – 1944) was a Russian publisher.

He was the father of Socialist realist novelist Yury Krymov.

In 1906, Kopelman set up the Brier publishing house in Saint Petersburg with Zinovii Grzhebin. In 1918, they moved the publishing house to Moscow, and then shut it down in 1922 when he emigrated to Berlin.
