= Tanker "Derbent" =

- Russian: Танкер "Дербент"
- Directed by: Aleksandr Faintsimmer
- Written by: Sergei Yermolinsky
- Produced by: M. Shor
- Starring: Iona Biy-Brodskiy; Emmanuil Geller; Anatoliy Goryunov; Tatyana Govorkova; Aleksandr Grechanyy; Mikhail Ivanov; Gennadi Karnovich-Valua; Yefim Kopelyan
- Cinematography: Sergei Ivanov
- Music by: Gavriil Popov
- Production company: Odessa Film Studio
- Release date: 1941
- Running time: 83 min.
- Country: Soviet Union
- Language: Russian

Tanker "Derbent", (Russian: Танкер "Дербент", romanized: Tanker 'Derbent') is a 1941 Soviet adventure film directed by Aleksandr Faintsimmer based on the story of the same name by Yuri Krymov.

The tanker Derbent is sent to rescue the crew of the tanker Agamali, on which a fire occurred.

== Plot ==
In 1937, in a bustling port city on the Caspian Sea, the newly repaired tanker Derbent is launched. The repair team, led by Basov, is commended for their work, but Basov remains dissatisfied, believing they could achieve much more if outdated labor standards were abandoned. Seizing the opportunity to test his methods, the management assigns Basov as the mechanic of Derbent. On the eve of the tanker’s departure, Basov has a heated argument with his wife, Musya, leaving their relationship strained.

Aboard Derbent, discipline is lacking, the crew regularly falls behind schedule, and rival sailors from the tanker Agamali mockingly label them "slowpokes" and "floating coffins." Determined to prove them wrong, Basov motivates his crew to improve engine performance and tighten discipline, initiating an informal competition with Agamali. However, the first mate, Kasatsky, harbors a grudge against Basov and seeks to claim any success for himself. As the competition heats up, Derbent pulls ahead, showcasing its improvements.

The rivalry takes an unexpected turn when Agamali suffers a breakdown near the island of Chechen. Basov and his crew tow the stricken vessel, only for a fire to break out onboard. Kasatsky orders the towline cut to avoid further risk, but Basov, political officer Bredis, and the rest of the crew convince their timid captain, Kutasov, to send rescue boats. Braving the flames, the sailors of Derbent work alongside Agamali’s crew to extinguish the fire. Both tankers return safely to port, where the sailors, including the injured, are warmly welcomed by their families. Musya reconciles with Basov, admitting her earlier mistakes, and Bredis delivers a heartfelt speech honoring the resilience and dedication of Caspian workers.

== Cast ==
- Iona Biy-Brodskiy as Cargo assistant captain
- Emmanuil Geller as Zhora
- Anatoliy Goryunov as Yevgeny Vasilievich
- Tatyana Govorkova as Simochka
- Aleksandr Grechanyy as Seaman in shipping company
- Mikhail Ivanov as Photographer
- Vasili Merkuryev as Dogailo
- Gennadi Karnovich-Valua as Reporter
- Yefim Kopelyan as Helmsman
- Lidiya Sukharevskaya as Vera the barmaid
- Pyotr Kirillov as Bredis
