= Maria Chambers-Bilibin =

Russian-English artist (1874–1962)

- Мария Яковлевна Чемберс-Билибина
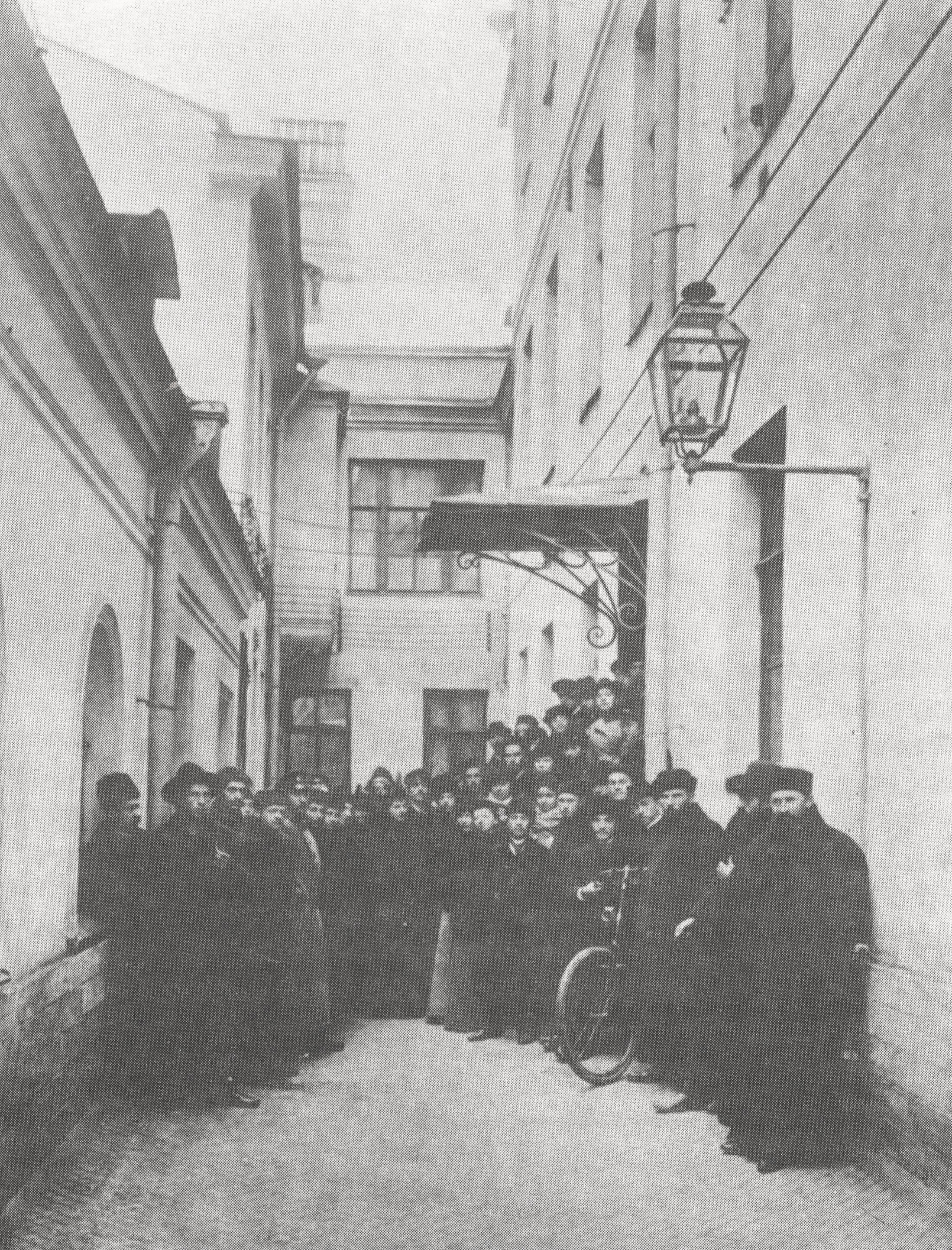
- Teachers and students of the Tenisheva drawing studio (St Petersburg, mid 1890s)
- Born: March 1, 1874; St Petersburg, Russian Empire
- Died: June 6, 1962 (aged 88); Oxford, England
- Movement: Arts and crafts, Mir iskusstva
- Spouse: Ivan Bilibin (m. 1902; sep. 1911)
- Children: 2

Maria Chambers-Bilibin (Russian: Мария Яковлевна Чемберс-Билибина, romanized: Maria Yakovlevna Chambers-Bilibina; 1874—1962), also known in English as Mary Elisabeth Veronica Chambers-Bilibin (née Chambers), was a Russian and English graphic artist and children's book illustrator.

== Biography ==
Maria Chambers was born to James Stephen Chambers and Elizaveta Mary Page at St Petersburg, Russia on 1 March 1874.

=== Career in St Petersburg ===
In the 1890s, Chambers studied under Ilya Repin at the Imperial Society for the Encouragement of the Arts at Princess Maria Tenisheva's School.

On 28 April 1902, Chambers married her former teacher and fellow pupil at the Tenisheva studio, artist Ivan Bilibin. They had two sons; Alexander (1903–1972; artist) and Ivan (1908–1993; journalist). The spouses separated in 1911.

In the 1900s and early 1910s, Chambers-Bilibin illustrated books for St Petersburg publishing houses, designed postcards and bookplates. Chambers-Bilibin was peripherally involved in the Mir iskusstva, of which her husband was a member, and she was well acquainted with Anna Ostroumova-Lebedeva.

Chambers-Bilibin's main artistic influences were the Mir iskusstva artists, particularly Bilibin and Heorhiy Narbut.

She participated in exhibitions of the New Artists' Society (St Petersburg, 1909, 1913), the Union of Russian Artists (St Petersburg and Kyiv, 1910), the Mir iskusstva Association (St. Petersburg, 1912, 1913; Moscow, 1912; Kyiv, 1913), and at the Izdebskiy Salon (1909, 1910). The Union of Russian Artists exhibition in St Petersburg in February-March 1910, was viewed by over 16,000 people.

Chambers-Bilibin's most notable works are her illustrations for Lermontov's poems. She illustrated the poem Three Palms (1908), the poems Litvinka and Oleg, which were published in his Collected works (Pechatnik, Moscow, 1914-1915). She made the first attempts to combine the techniques of book graphics developed by the Mir iskusstva students with Lermontov’s poetry.

In his memoirs, Mstislav Dobuzhinsky recalls being introduced to Chambers-Bilibin by Alexandre Benois, who called her “a very nice artist”. (Note: «Поедемте к Билибину, надо его наконец вытащить, кстати и жена его очень милая художница») Dobuzhinsky agreed and described her as “a very sweet artist and a very sweet person”. (Note: была действительно очень милой художницей и милым человеком.) In 1987, Dobuzhinsky opined that Chambers-Bilibin’s talent died out as a result of devoting herself entirely to raising her deaf son.

=== Post-Russia ===
In May 1914, Chambers-Bilibin travelled to Switzerland for medical treatment of her eldest son, who suffered from complete hearing loss as a result of scarlet fever. Chambers-Bilibin and her sons remained abroad due to the outbreak of the First World War.

Initially, Chambers-Bilibin and her sons lived with Russian friends in Italy. From September-December 1916, the family lived in Paris. In January 1917, the family arrived in London with the intention of returning to Russia through Scandinavia. However, they became stateless following the February Revolution. From 1917, Chambers-Bilibin and her sons lived in England and continued painting.

Bilibin wrote to Chambers-Bilibin in 1922, asking for a divorce (in order for Bilibin to marry another of his former pupils, Aleksandra Shchekatikhina-Pototskaya), to which she did not respond. However, they were divorced by 1923.

In 1931 she participated in an art exhibition of the Russian Group in Prince Vladimir Galitzine's Gallery.

Chambers-Bilibin died on 6 June 1962 in Oxford, England.
