= Zhupel =

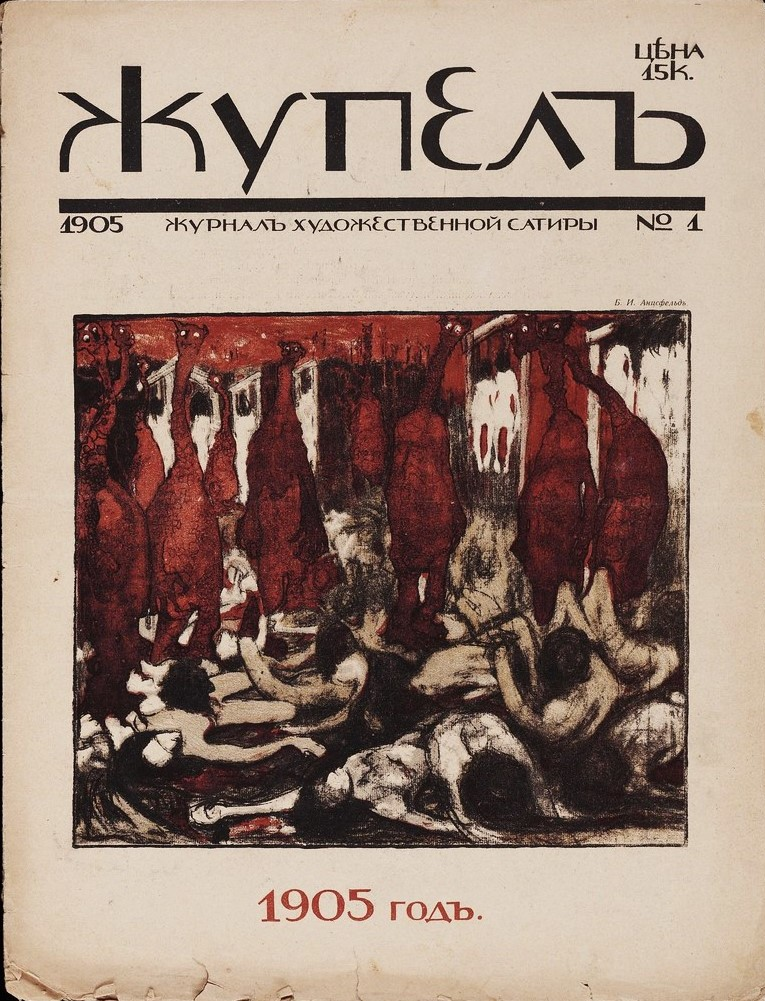
- First issue (1905, cover art by Boris Anisfeld)
- Categories: Satirical arts, culture and politics
- Founder: Zinovii Grzhebin
- First issue: 1905
- Final issue: 1906
- Country: Russian Empire
- Based in: Saint-Petersburg
- Language: Russian

Zhupel (Russian: Жупел) was a Russian satirical magazine, founded by Zinovii Grzhebin in 1905. Among the contributors were the most famous Russian writers and artists of the time. Despite the success, like many other Russian satirical magazines, it was closed by the Tsarist government after publishing three issues, while Grzhebin was imprisoned. In 1906, the creators tried to revive the journal under the name Hell's Mail, but it was also closed after three issues.

In English publications, the name is often translated as Bugbear, although the creators wrote that the word жупел means 'hellish sulfur'.

== History ==
The magazine was established in late 1905, after the October Manifesto, by Zinovii Grzhebin, a Russian cartoonist and publisher, later the founder of a symbolist publishing house Shipovnik. His idea was to create a Russian version of Simplicissimus, a political satire magazine with antimonarchical incline. Mstislav Dobuzhinsky said that Grzhebin performed "a real miracle" as a manager, successfully uniting artists and writers from the opposite circles of Russian literature world in one enterprise.

The magazine had only three issues: two in December 1905 and one in January 1906. Because of the very harsh caricatures and satire about the government, Grzhebin was arrested and imprisoned for a year for "disrespecting the Imperial authority". He spent 8 months in the Kresty Prison. After the authorities closed the magazine, it was revived under the name Adskaya pochta (Hell's Mail or Infernal Post), but it was also suppressed after publishing three issues. The name was taken from Adskaya Pochta, a satirical magazine, closed by Catherine II in 1769.

Among the contributors were modernist artists Mstislav Dobuzhinsky, Boris Kustodiev, Ivan Bilibin and Eugene Lanceray and writers Maxim Gorky, Ivan Bunin and Fyodor Sologub.

The magazine was closely associated with the artists of Simplicissimus: for example, some of the cartoons of Zhupel were reprinted in Simplicissimus. One of the numbers informed that artists of Simplicissimus will cooperate with Zhupel; the announcement was published with a vignette by Thomas Theodor Heine.

== Gallery ==
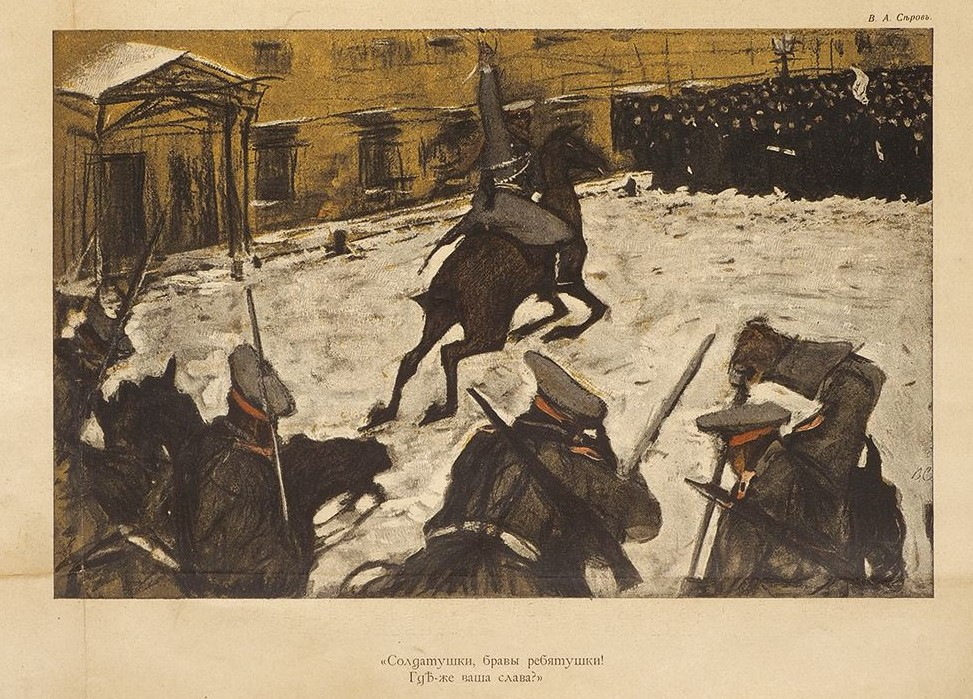
Soldiers, Soldiers, Heroes Every One - a drawing by Valentin Serov on Bloody Sunday

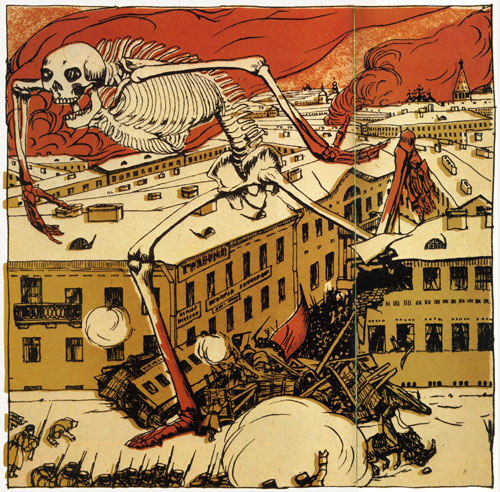
Introduction by Boris Kustodiev - a cartoon on the Moscow uprising of 1905

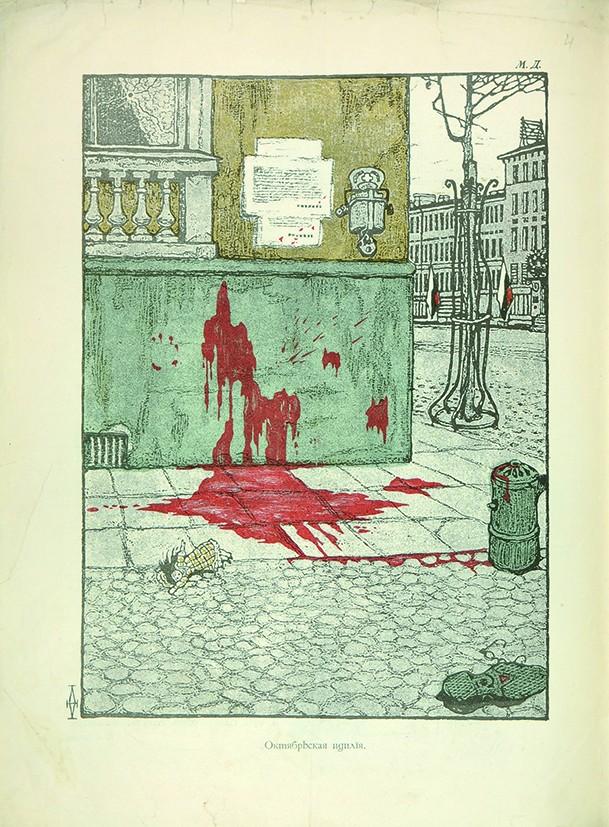
October Idyll by Mstislav Dobuzhinsky (1905)

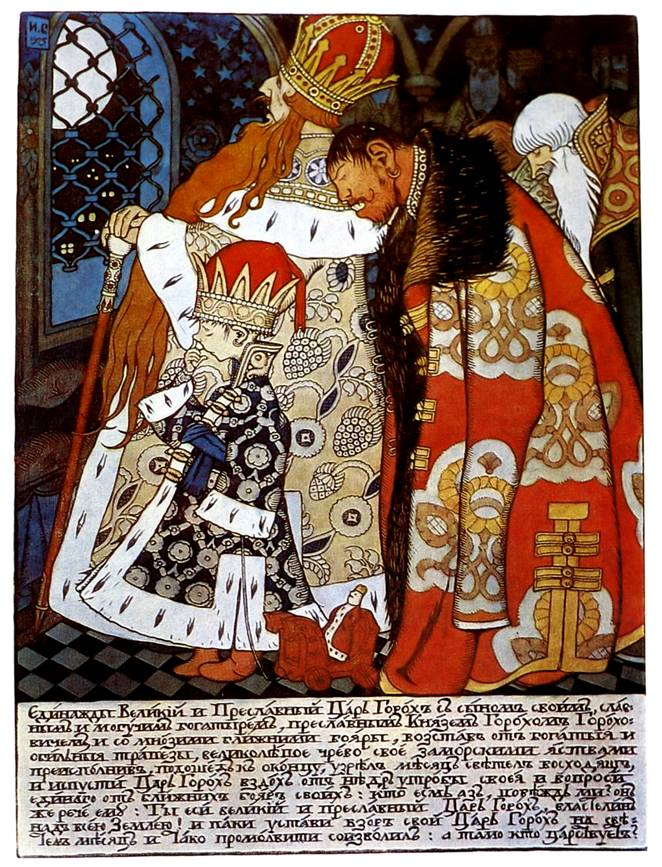
1905 cartoon by Ivan Bilibin

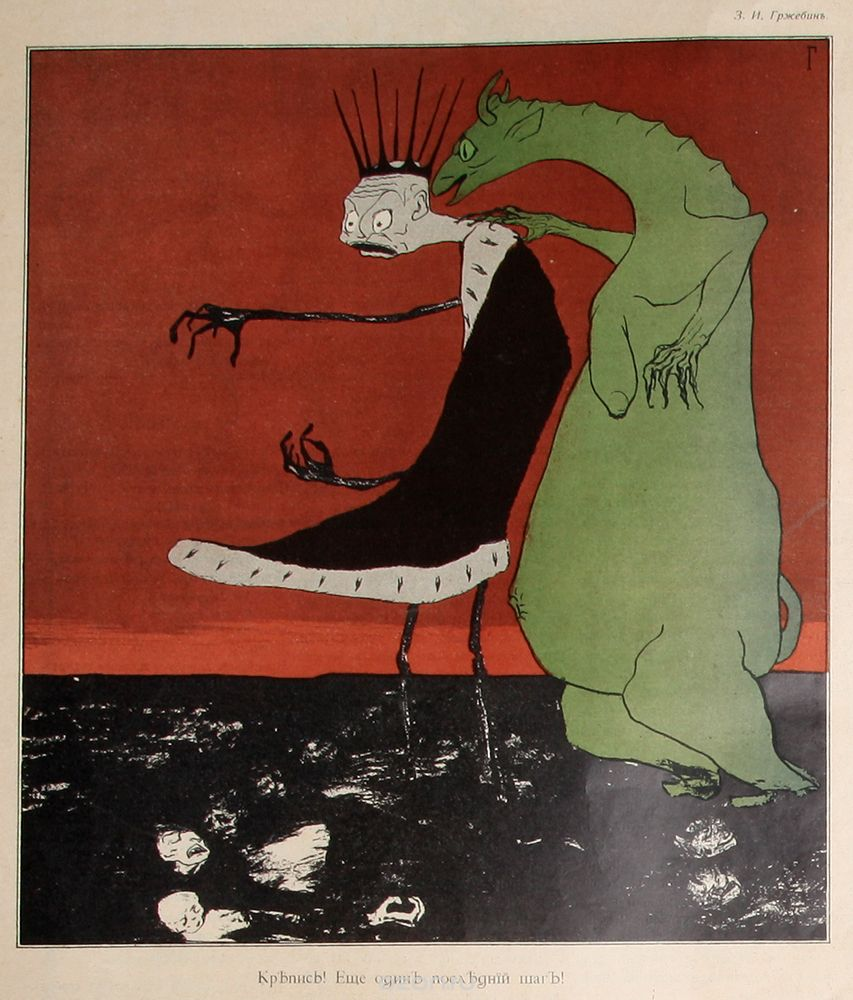
1906 cartoon by Zinovii Grzhebin

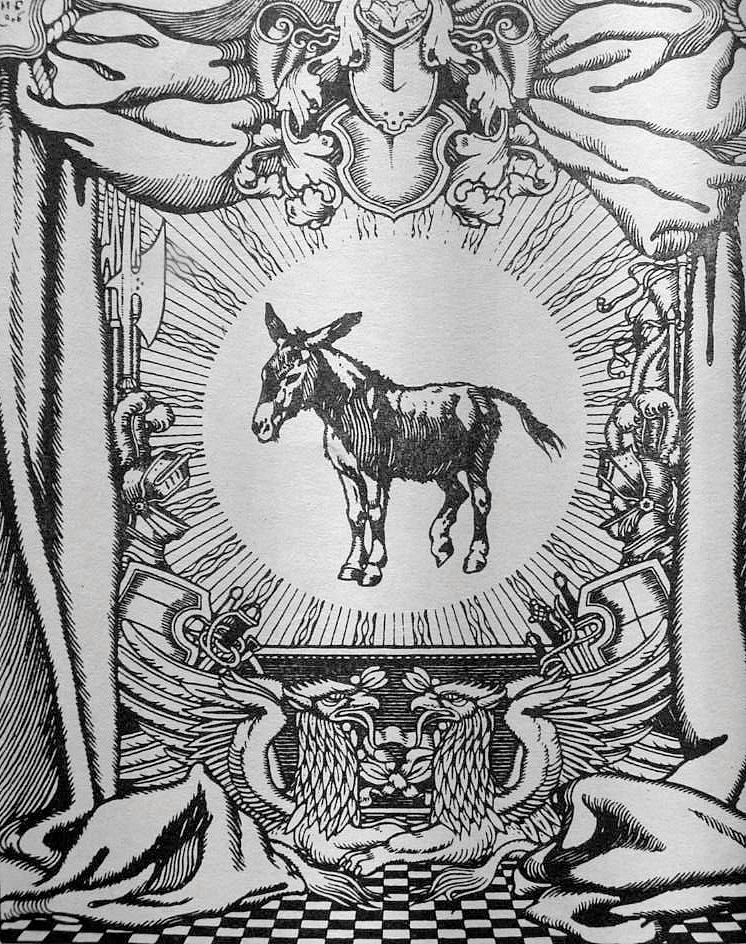
Donkey by Ivan Bilibin (1906)

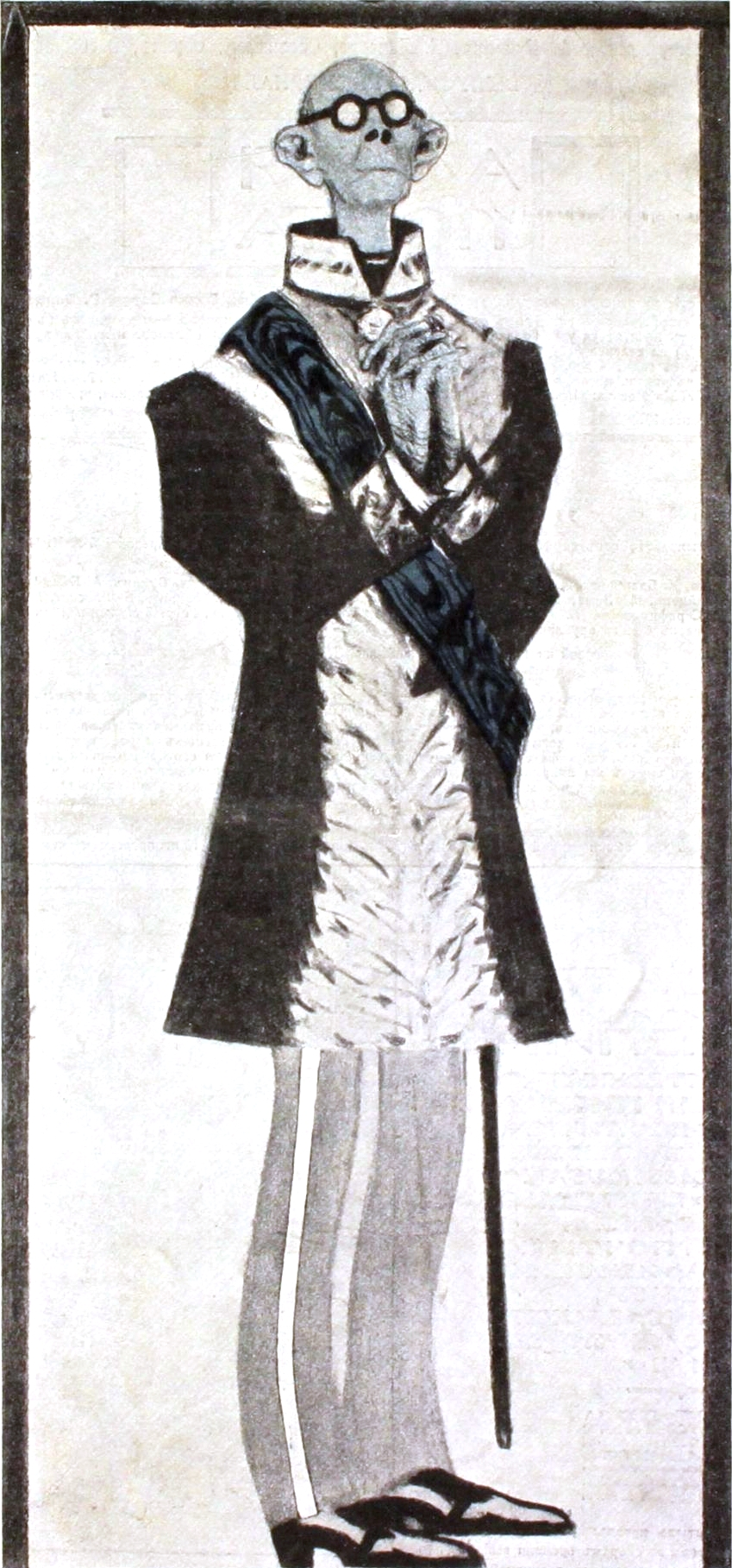
Konstantin Pobedonostsev by Boris Kustodiev (Hell's Mail)
