= Zinovii Grzhebin =

Russian publisher and illustrator (1877–1929)

- Зиновий Гржебин
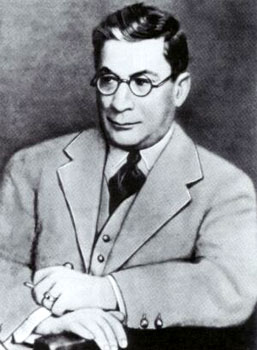
- Born: 1877; Chuguev, Kharkov Governorate, Russian Empire
- Died: 4 February 1929 (aged 51–52); Paris, France
- Known for: Zhupel, Adskaya Pochta magazines; Shipovnik, Pantheon, Vsemirnaya Literature publishing houses

Zinovii Isaevich Grzhebin (Russian: Зиновий Исаевич Гржебин, romanized: Zinovy Isayevich Grzhebin; French transliteration: Grjebine) was a Russian publisher and caricature illustrator. He represented more than 20% of the publishing market in Russia in the early 1910s and made a significant impact on development of the Russian book publishing industry.

== Biography ==
=== Early years and education ===
Zinovii was born in Chuguev, in the Kharkov Governorate of the Russian Empire (now Ukraine). As the son of a soldier who had served 25 years in the Imperial Russian Army, he was less constrained by the anti-semitic measures regulating Russian society at the time and was permitted to stay in either St. Petersburg and Moscow. He graduated from Kharkov art school in 1899, then studied at Simon Hollochi school in Munich, later in Paris at the studio of Anton Ažbe.

=== Beginning of the career ===
His close friend Korney Chukovsky recalled, that in 1905 Grzhebin returned to Russia as poor as a church mouse and with no social connections, but with an incredible energy and desire to work. He had an idea to create a Russian version of Simplicissimus, a political satire magazine with antimonarchical incline.

==== Zhupel ====
In late 1905, Grzhebin established a satirical magazine Zhupel (Russian: Жупелъ, lit. 'bugbear'). Mstislav Dobuzhinsky said, that Grzhebin performed "a real miracle" as a manager, successfully uniting artists and writers from the opposite circles of Russian literature world in one enterprise.

Zhupel had only three issues: two in December 1905 and one in January 1906. Because of the very harsh caricatures and satire about the government, Grzhebin was arrested and imprisoned for a year for "disrespecting the Imperial authority". He spent 8 months in the Kresty Prison. The Zhupel was closed, but soon revived under the name Adskaya pochta with even bolder articles and pictures.

No.1, complete issue

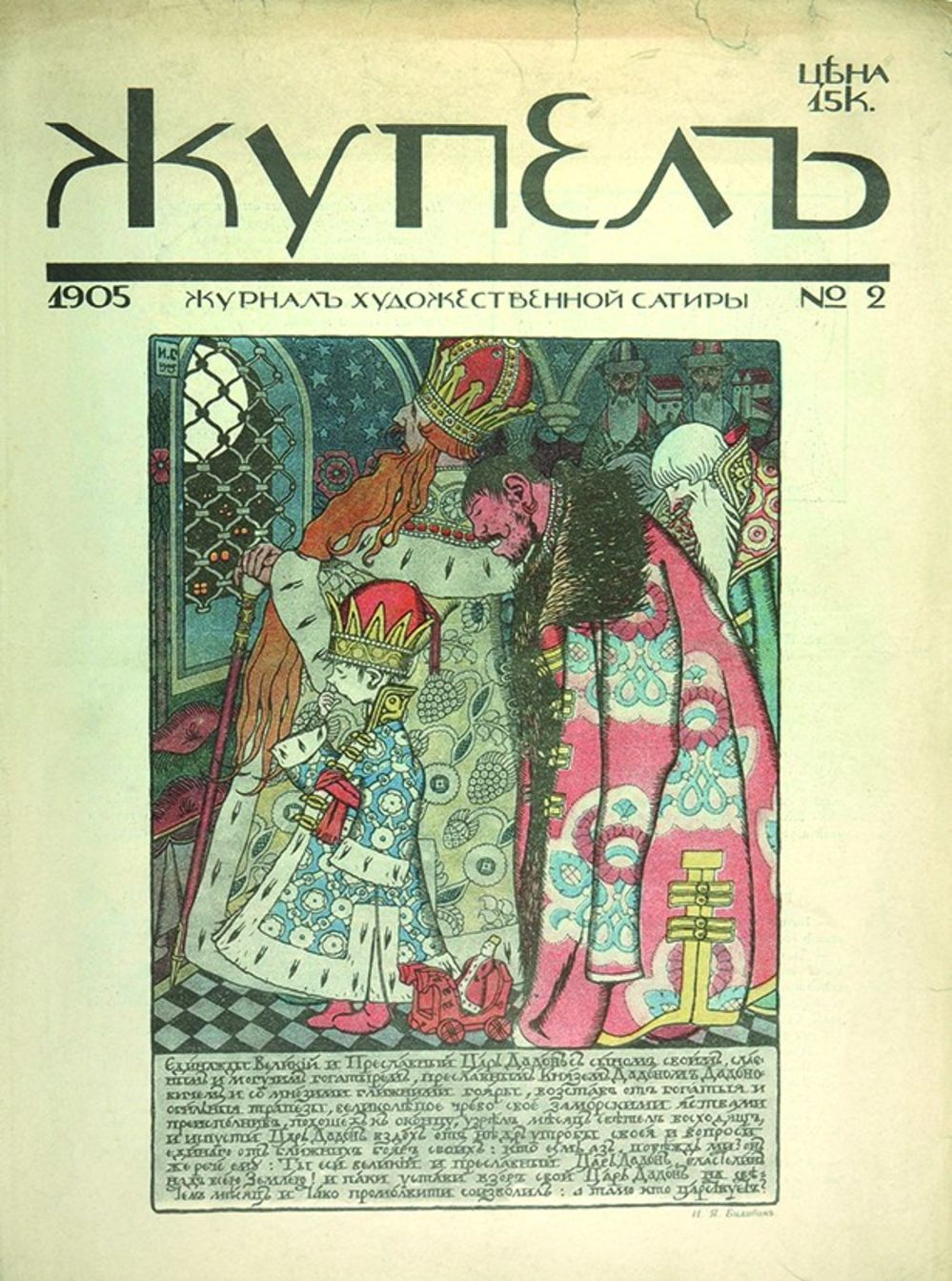
No.2, cover only

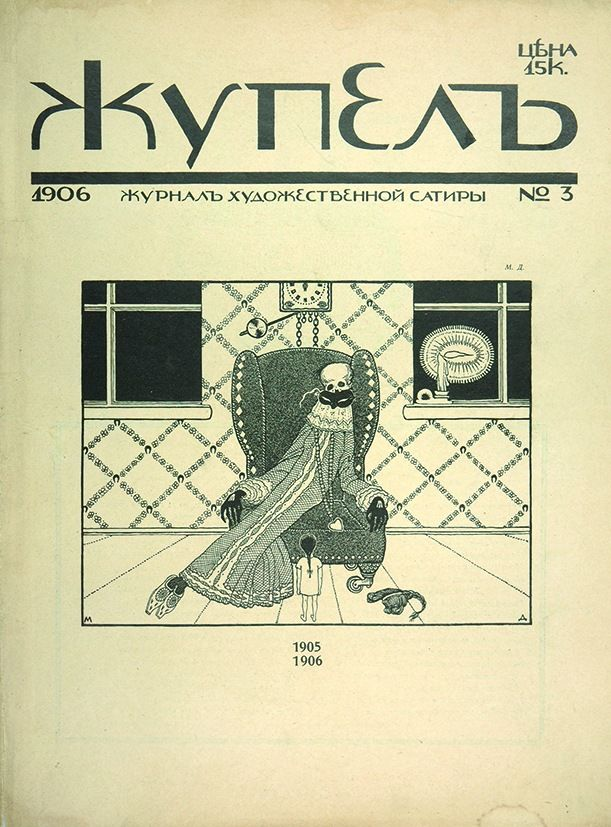
No.3, cover only

Hell's Mail, No.1 (complete issue)

Hell's Mail, No.2 (complete issue)

Hell's Mail, No.3: "Olympus" special (complete issue)

=== Shipovnik ===
In 1906, Grzhebin opened the Shipovnik (Russian: Шиповник, lit. 'rosehip') publishing house at 31 Nikolaevskaya Street, St Petersburg, in partnership with Solomon Yuryevich Kopelman. In different years, Alexander Blok, Leonid Andreyev, Fyodor Sologub, and Boris Zaytsev worked at Shipovnik as editors-in-chief and art consultants. Many artists of the "Mir Iskusstva" created illustrations of Shipovnik's issues. Grzhebin was in charge of finances and also led negotiations with authors. The publishing house became one of the leaders on the contemporary book market, it printed scientific literature, school books, but mostly novels and poetry from both well-known mature writers to young aspiring authors.

After the October Revolution, Shipovnik was moved to Moscow, and then shut down by censorship department in 1922.

=== Other projects ===
From 1907 to 1912, Grzhebin headed the Pantheon publishing house, which focused on translated classic literature, but in many ways anticipated and formed the future Shipovnik. In 1914, Grzhebin created the Otechestvo magazine, opposed to Maxim Gorky's "Letopis'". In 1916, he collaborated with Gorky at the Parus publishing house, then in 1917—1918, Grzhebin headed the editors office of the newspaper Novaya zhizn".

=== Family ===
With his wife Maria Constantinovna Doriomedova (1880–1967), born in Nerchinsky Zavod in Siberia, Grzhebin had five children: Lya, Irina, Hélène, Alexis, and Tovy. Tovy was a physicist also economist. Hélène Grjebine wrote her story of emigration. Irina Grjebine, who trained as a dancer under Olga Preobrajenska and Lya Grjebine, was also a dancer.

=== Emigration ===
The Russian Revolution completely changed the situation on the book market: the equipment was destroyed, the typographic personnel was mostly called up into the Red Army, no paper of suitable quality was left in the whole country. Even though Zinovii Grzhebin sympathized the revolution, he found no place for his life's work in the Russian SFSR.

=== Vsemirnaya Literature ===
Grzhebin was closely associated with Maxim Gorky. He started working with Gorky in 1905, publishing the novels given to him by the author. He created the Grzhebin Publishing company in 1919, until 1921, when he was given permission to emigrate. He travelled in the same train as Gorky following the latter's unsuccessful bid to save the life of Nikolay Gumilev, shot for his monarchist views. He settled in Berlin at the end of 1921, where he published books under contract to the Soviet government, despite allegations of cheating. In Berlin, he published more than 220 books. However, when a series called Letopis revoluistii included works by Fyodor Dan, Julius Martov, Viktor Chernov and Nikolai Sukhanov, the Bolsehviks were unhappy as they regards these fellow socialists as counter-revolutionaries. A trial ensued in which Grzhebin's right to be paid for the books that he published according to the contract signed with the Soviet government was recognised.

Grzhebin was employed by Vsemirnaya Literature ('World Literature'), a semi-official literary publishing house established by Maxim Gorky and Anatoly Lunacharsky, Peoples' Commissar for Education on 4 September 1918. Grzhebin owned paintings by Isaac Levitan, Albert Nikolayevitch Benois, Kustodiev, and Boris Grigoriev which were hung on the walls of the offices. He lost all his fortune that was taken back by the Soviet government. He died prematurely on 4 February 1929 in Vanves, a suburb of Paris.

== Sources ==
- Gollerbakh, E. A. (2010). "Немецкий след в русском пантеоне": Петербургское издательство "Пантеон" (1907-1912) как агент немецкой культуры [German Traces in Russian Pantheon: The Pantheon Publishing House (1907-1912) as a German Cultural Agent]. Вестник Русской Христианской Гуманитарной Академии (in Russian). 11 (3). Russian Christian Humanitarian Academy: 177–186.
- Miroshkin, A. (2015-04-25). "Издатель большого масштаба" [The Big Scale Publisher]. Читаем вместе. Навигатор в мире книг (in Russian). p. 36. ISBN 9785457758179.
- Dobuzhinsky, Mstislav (2016). Воспоминания [The Recollections] (in Russian). Moscow, Berlin: Direct Media. pp. 593–599. ISBN 9785447589486.
- Ippolitov, S. S. (2003). "Гржебин Зиновий Исаевич (1877 1929)" [Grzhebin Zinovii Isaevich (1877 1929)]. Новый Исторический Вестник (in Russian) (9). The New Historical Bulletin: 143–166.
- Romaykina, J. S. (2013). З. И. Гржебин и литературно-художественные альманахи издательства "Шиповник" [Z. I. Grzhebin and Literary and Art Magazine of the "Shipovnik" Publishing House] (in Russian). Saratov: Saratov State University. pp. 51–57.
- Romaykina, J. S.; Gaponenkov, A. A. (2016). Литературно-художественный альманах издательства "Шиповник" (1907–1917): тип издания, интегрирующий контекст ["Shipovnik" Literature-Art Almanac (1907–1917): type, context] (PDF) (in Russian). pp. 3–209.
- Khlebnikov, L. M. (1971). Из истории горьковских издательств: "Всемирная Литература" и "Издательство З. И. Гржебина" [History of Gorky's Publishing Houses 'Vsemirnaya Literatura' and 'Grzhebin's Publishing House'] (in Russian). Moscow: Nauka. pp. 668–704.
