= Aleksandra Shchekatikhina-Pototskaya =

Russian artist (1892–1967)

Aleksandra Vasilievna Shchekatikhina-Pototskaya
- Александра Васильевна Щекатихина-Потоцкая
- Born: May 20, 1892; Aleksandrovsk, Russian Empire
- Died: October 23, 1967 (aged 75); Leningrad, USSR
- Education: Drawing School of the Society of Artists
- Known for: porcelain artist
- Movement: Mir iskusstva, Art Deco
- Spouse(s): Nikolai Filippovich Potocki (m. 1915; died 1920) Ivan Bilibin (m. 1923; died 1942)
- Children: 1
- Awards: Gold Medal for Porcelain at the International Exhibition of Modern Decorative and Industrial Arts

Aleksandra Vasilievna Shchekatikhina-Pototskaya (Russian: Александра Васильевна Щекатихина-Потоцкая; 20 May [O.S. 8 May] 1892 - 1967) (née Shchekatikhina) was a Russian porcelain artist, illustrator, painter, and theatre set designer.

The Russian State Museum has described her as one of the most impressive Russian porcelain artists of the first half of the 20th Century. Her works were produced in the Soviet Union, France, and Egypt. She was particularly inspired by Russian folklore and icons, and her style is recognised for its bright colours, and placing great emphasis on costume. She was influenced by Orthodox icons, and her ceramic painting shows a lack of perspective.

Shchekatikhina was a member of the World of Art and the artists' section of the Union of Russian Art Workers in France.

== Biography ==
Shchekatikhina was born on 20 May [O.S. 8 May] 1892 in Aleksandrovsk, to a family with Old Believer and merchant heritage. The family's traditional craft was icon painting.

Shchekatikhina graduated from high school in Aleksandrovsk, and in 1908 she moved to St Petersburg. After failing her entrance exam at the Imperial Academy of Arts, she entered the Drawing School of the Society of Artists, where she studied under Nicholas Roerich and Ivan Bilibin.

In 1910, her art school sponsored Shchekatikhina to travel to northern Russia to explore traditional architecture and peasant folk art, under Bilibin's insistence. In 1913, she travelled to Greece, Italy, and France with a foreign pension. Shchekatikhina studied for several months at the Académie Ranson in Paris under Maurice Denis, Félix Vallotton, and Paul Sérusier.

From 1912 to 1917, Shchekatikhina created a series of watercolours based on Russian fairy tales and legends. She painted for the magazine Voice of Life.

Shchekatikhina worked on several theatrical projects with Roerich, including the Snow Maiden and Swan Lake. She assisted Roerich with the design of the ballet The Rite of Spring by Igor Stravinsky for Sergei Diaghilev's production in 1913.

From 1915, Shchekatikhina participated in World of Art exhibitions. That year, she left the Drawing School, and married lawyer Nikolai Potocki. They had one son, Mstislav.

In 1916, she designed the opera Rogneda, produced in Moscow.

In 1918, Shchekatikhina was recruited by the graphic artist Sergey Chekhonin to join the State Porcelain Factory. At that time, the primary focus of production was artistic propaganda to praise the new Soviet state. Here, she rapidly asserted herself as one of the most innovative designers.

Porcelain was recognised as a medium that could easily disseminate powerful ideological messages while being decorative, and as such Shchekatikhina is considered an important revolutionary artist. She was known for producing emotive works with vibrant colours and dramatic or festive themes. During the Russian famine of 1921–1922, like several other artists at the time, Shchekatikhina integrated the themes of the famine and the subsequent typhus outbreak into her porcelain painting, with some of her works being sold to raise funds for the victims' families.

In 1919, Shchekatikhina exhibited in the First State Free Exhibition of Works of Art in Petrograd, and in 1921 exhibited in the House of Arts in Petrograd. In 1922, she exhibited in the Fifth exhibition of the Community of Artists in Petrograd and the World of Art in Petrograd.

Shchekatikhina was ordered to create sketches of costumes for the opera The Demon in 1919 in Moscow, and the scenery and curtain for the opera Sadko in 1920 in Petrograd.

In 1920, Shchekotikhina's husband died. At the suggestion of her former teacher Ivan Bilibin, she went abroad to Germany to become acquainted with the work of the Royal Porcelain Factory in Berlin.

=== Egypt ===
In the 1920s, Shchekatikhina's former teacher Bilibin was living in Egypt. When his relationship with artist Ludmila Chirikova-Shnitnikova ended in April 1922, Ivan Bilibin was anticipating to follow her to Europe. However, in October 1922, Bilibin unexpectedly received a letter from Shchekatikhina in Petrograd. In reply, Bilibin sent Shchekatikhina a telegram with an offer to become his wife. Three days later, Bilibin received a positive response. However, Bilibin was at the time still legally married to Maria Chambers-Bilibin, and wrote to her to ask for a divorce.

In February 1923, Shchekatikhina arrived in Cairo with her seven-year-old son Mstislav. Bilibin and Shchekatikhina were married at the end of February 1923.

In Egypt, Shchekatikhina created a series of painted porcelain items with oriental themes. In the summer of 1924, she travelled with her family to Syria and Palestine. When they returned to Egypt in October, the family moved to Alexandria.

In March 1925, they travelled to the Luxor Temple in Upper Egypt. She painted sketches in oil and watercolour. From December 1924-January 1925, Bilibin and Shchekatikhina held a joint exhibition.

=== France ===
In August 1925, the family moved to Paris, the impetus being the International Exhibition of Modern Decorative and Industrial Arts, which was then held in Paris. Shchekatikhina's works were exhibited at the fair, and she was awarded the gold medal for porcelain.

In Paris, Shchekatikhina joined the Société des Artistes Indépendants and took part in the Salon d'Automne and the Salon des Tuileries. She maintained contact with the State Porcelain Factory in Leningrad and exhibited her work there. She participated in group exhibitions of Russian artists in Paris, Birmingham (1928), Brussels (1928), Belgrade (1930), and Prague (1935). Shchekatikhina held solo exhibitions in Paris in 1926 and 1929 and a joint exhibition with Bilibin in Amsterdam in 1929. In 1927, she exhibited at the International Exhibition of Art Industry and Decorative Arts in Monza. Her works continued to appear in exhibitions in the USSR.

Shchekatikhina painted landscapes, portraits, and still lifes, painted fabrics, and designed models of men's and women's clothing. She created illustrations for the books, including a 1927 edition of Taras Bulba by Nikolai Gogol and a 1933 edition of The Adventures of Pinocchio. She painted porcelain for the Manufacture Nationale de Sèvres, which included dishes, vases, and plates. She worked with Bilibin on the sets for the 1929 opera The Tale of Tsar Saltan at the Théâtre des Champs-Élysées.

During the summers from 1927 to 1936, the family spent their time in La Favière, where they had purchased a small plot of land with other Russian émigrés. Sasha Chorny also resided there during the summers and was well acquainted with the family.

In September 1935, Bilibin obtained Soviet citizenship.

=== Return to the USSR ===
At the beginning of September 1936, the family set out for the USSR on the Soviet steamship Lagoda from Antwerp. They arrived in Leningrad on 16 September, and the family settled in the city. On 20 October, a special meeting was held to introduce Shchekatikhina and Bilibin to the Leningrad artists. Shchekatikhina resumed work at the Leningrad Porcelain Factory (now under Nikolai Suetin), which she had left in 1923.

After the Second World War outbreak, Bilibin rejected an offer of evacuation out of Moscow. During the war, Shchekotikhina's art turned to ancient Russian heroic subjects. On 7 February 1942, Bilibin died of starvation during the Siege of Leningrad. Despite contracting pneumonia, Shchekatikhina survived the war.

In the post-war years, she worked mainly on mass-produced porcelain. She retired in 1953. In 1955, she held a personal exhibition in Leningrad.

Shchekatikhina died in St Petersburg in 1967, aged 75. She is buried at the Bolsheokhtinskoye Cemetery in St Petersburg.
