= Yury Krymov =

Soviet writer (1908–1941)

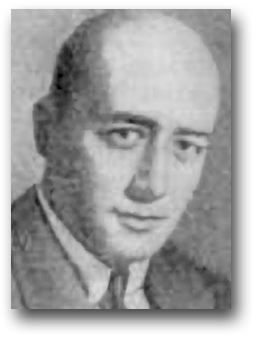
- Born: Yury Solomonovich Kopelman; 19 January 1908; Saint Petersburg, Russian Empire
- Died: 20 September 1941 (aged 33); Chornobai Raion, Cherkasy Oblast
- Education: University of Moscow
- Occupation: Engineer
- Relatives: Solomon Yuryevich Kopelman (father); Vera Yevgenyevna Beklemisheva (mother)
- Writing career
- Language: Russian
- Period: 1930s
- Genre: Fiction
- Subject: Stakhanovite movement
- Notable work: The Tanker ''Derbent''
- Literary movement: Socialist realism

Yury Solomonovich Krymov (Russian: Ю́рий Соломо́нович Кры́мов) is the pen name of Soviet novelist Yury Solomonovich Beklemishev (Ю́рий Соломо́нович Беклеми́шев; 19 January 1908 – 20 September 1941). The variants Yuri Krimov and Iurii Krymov are common transliterations.

== Biography ==
Krymov was born in Saint Petersburg in the Russian Empire on 19 January. Krymov's father, Solomon Yuryevich Kopelman, was an editor at the Brier publishing firm. However, Yuri took the surname of his mother, Vera Yevgenyevna Beklemisheva.

Krymov graduated from Moscow State University in 1930 and first found work building a radio station. In 1932 he joined Narkomvod ("the People's Commissariat for Water Transport") and in 1936 he served on the oil tanker Profintern on the Caspian Sea, and saw the Stakhanovite movement take hold. As well as serving on the Profintern, Krymov was an engineer in a shipyard on the Caspian. He then returned to Moscow and in 1938 completed his first published novel, Tanker "Derbent".

Krymov volunteered for the Red Army and joined the Communist Party in response to the German invasion of the Soviet Union in June 1941. He was a military journalist at the front and was with the Soviet 26th Army on the Southwestern Front when invading German forces encircled almost the entire front in the Battle of Kiev in August – September 1941. Krymov was killed near Kyiv on 20 September 1941.

== Tanker "Derbent" ==
The setting of Tanker "Derbent" is the shipping of oil across the Caspian Sea. Krymov named his fictional ship after the city of Derbent on the Caspian coast of the then Dagestan ASSR.

The novel illustrates how an ordinary communist turns an undisciplined crew into an efficient, cohesive collective. The novel found immediate critical success and was hailed as one of the best Socialist realist novels of the 1930s. Anna Karavaeva declared "In Krimov's story the theme of labour and the theme of rivalry at work are presented with profound lyricism". Valentin Kataev admitted "Frankly, I am somewhat envious, so well written are some of these pages." Anton Makarenko praised the book as "a living proof of the point of view that many of us hold, that a real writer, a real artist, issues from life."

Tanker "Derbent" was made into a film of the same name in 1941. The book was translated into a number of foreign languages, including English, German and Dutch. Krymov's original Russian edition continued to be reprinted almost annually well into the 1980s.

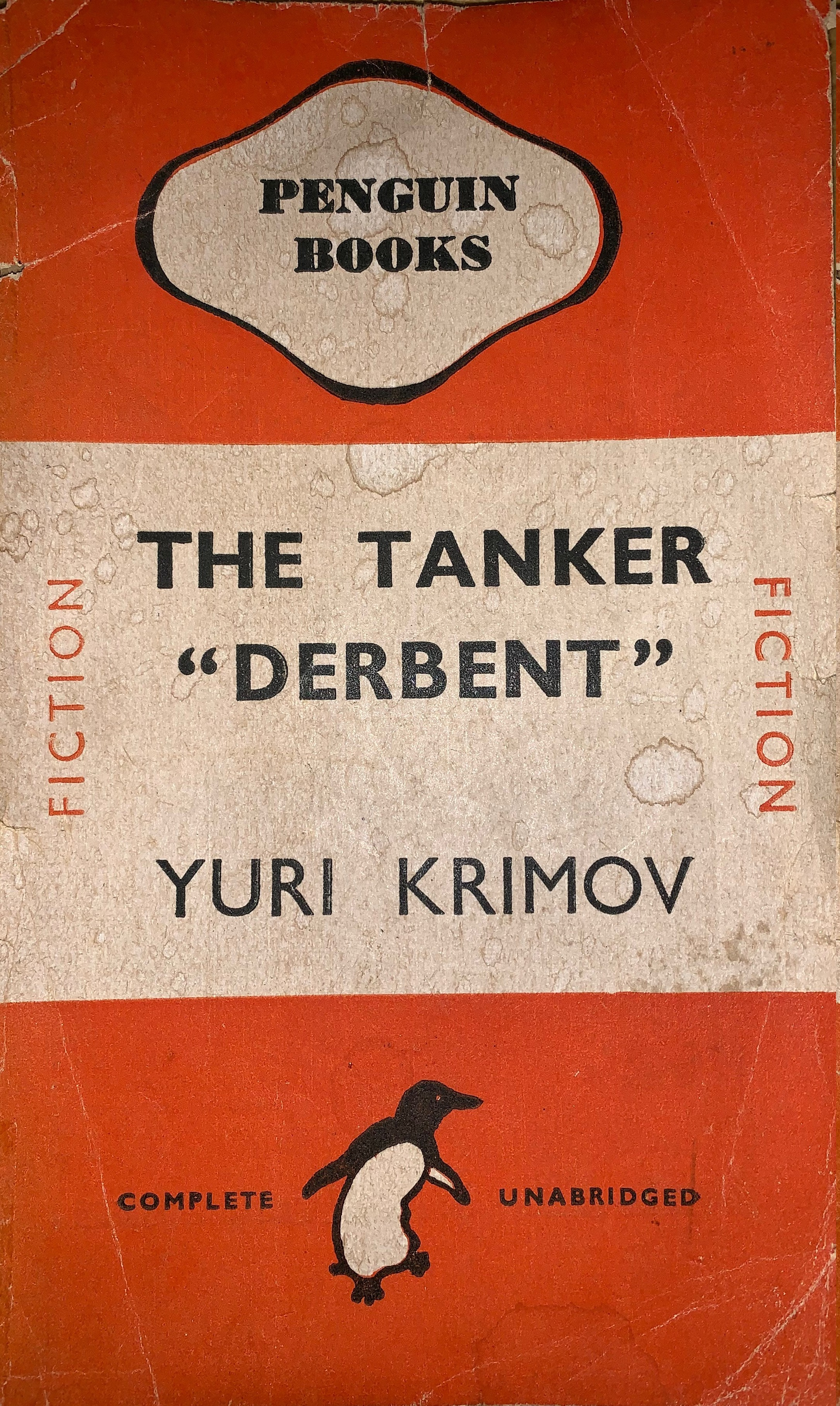
Image of the cover of the English (Penguin) edition of Yuri Krimov's novel 'The Tanker "Derbent"'

Penguin Books published the English edition, The Tanker "Derbent", in the United Kingdom in 1944. Later Allen Lane, the head of Penguin Books, asked the UK representative of Mezhdunarodnaya Kniga ("International Books") for Krymov to sign a copy of The Tanker "Derbent". In February 1946 the representative wrote back telling Lane that she was unable to do so because he had been killed in action.

== Work ==
- Krimov, Yuri (1944) [1938]. The Tanker "Derbent". Translated by Spink, John S. (English ed.). Harmondsworth: Penguin Books.
