= Ivan Bilibin =

Russian illustrator (1876–1942)

- Иван Билибин
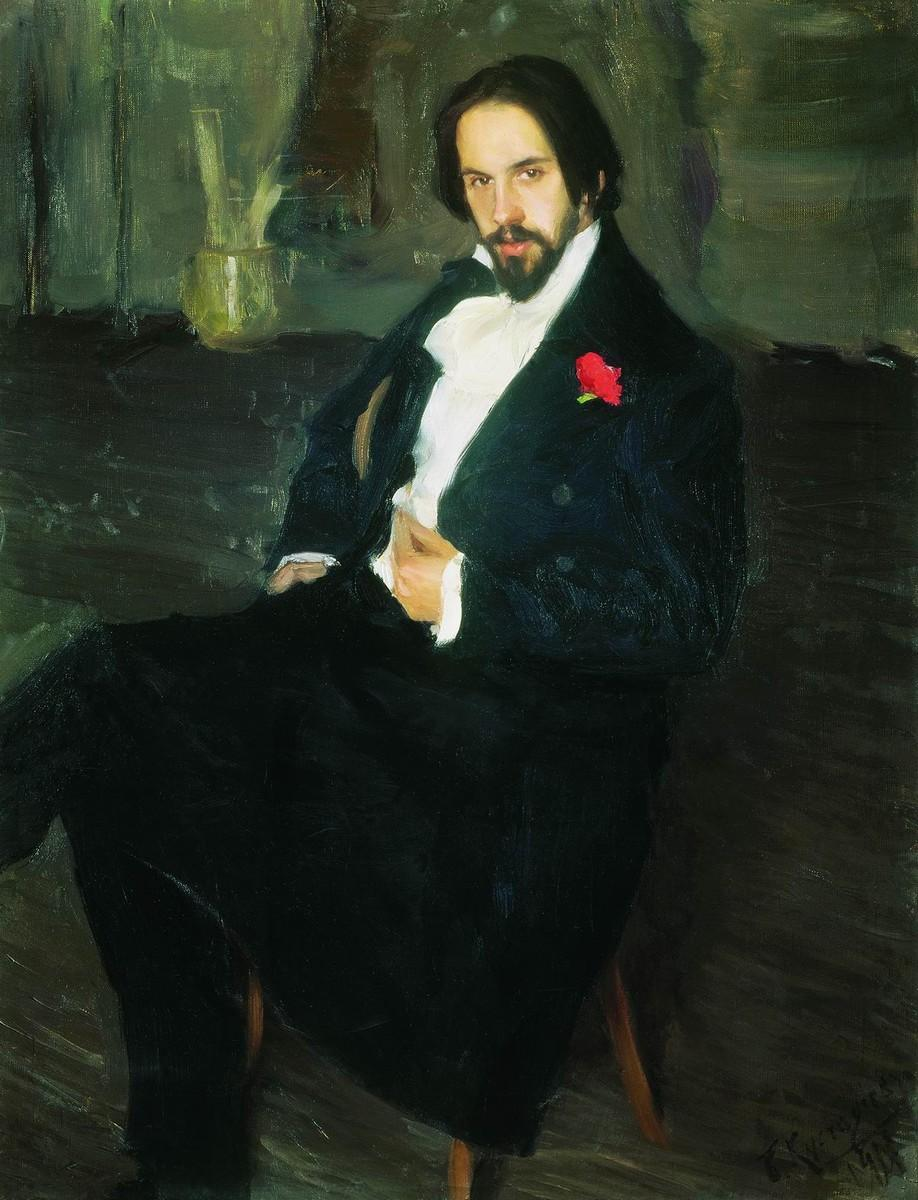
- Portrait by Boris Kustodiev, 1901
- Born: Ivan Yakovlevich Bilibin; 16 August [O.S. 4 August] 1876; Tarkhovka, St. Petersburg, Russian Empire
- Died: February 7, 1942 (aged 65); Leningrad, Russian SFSR, Soviet Union
- Education: Imperial Society for the Encouragement of the Arts (1895-1898); Princess Maria Tenisheva's School (1889-1900); Saint Petersburg Imperial University
- Movement: Mir iskusstva
- Spouses: Maria Chambers (m. 1902; sep. 1911) Aleksandra Shchekatikhina-Pototskaya (m. 1923)
- Partner(s): Renée O'Connell (1912–1917); Ludmilla Chirikova-Shnitnikova (1918-1922)
- Children: 2

Ivan Yakovlevich Bilibin (Russian: Иван Яковлевич Билибин, IPA: [ɪˈvan ˈjakəvlʲɪvʲɪdʑ bʲɪˈlʲibʲɪn]; 16 August [O.S. 4 August] 1876 – 7 February 1942) was a Russian illustrator and stage designer who took part in the Mir iskusstva ("World of Art"), contributed to the Ballets Russes, co-founded the Union of Russian Artists, and from 1937 was a member of the Artists' Union of the USSR. Ivan Bilibin gained popularity with his illustrations of Russian folk tales and Slavic folklore. Throughout his career he was inspired by the art and culture of medieval Russia.

== Biography ==
=== Early life ===
Ivan Bilibin was born on 16 August [O.S. 4 August] 1876 in Tarkhovka, Saint Petersburg. He was born to Yakov Ivanovich Bilibin, assistant chief physician at the Saint Petersburg Naval Hospital, and Vavara Alexandrova Bilibina (née Bubnova).

In 1890, Bilibin was accepted into the First Saint Petersburg Gymnasium. He graduated from the Gymnasium with a silver medal in 1896. From 1895 to the spring of 1898, he studied at the Imperial Society for the Encouragement of the Arts. In 1896 Bilibin began studying at the law faculty of the University of Saint Petersburg, and he completed his course there in 1900. Bilibin received a lawyer's diploma in the same year from the Law Faculty of Novorossiysk University.

In 1898 he studied at Anton Ažbe's Art School in Munich, where he was heavily influenced by Art Nouveau and the German satirical journal Simplicissimus, and then under Ilya Repin at Princess Maria Tenisheva's School in Saint Petersburg from 1898 to 1900.

Bilibin gained some success as early as 1899, when he first released illustrations for Russian fairy tales. The same year, after the formation of the artists' association Mir Iskusstva, in which Bilibin was an active member, his career as an illustrator of books and magazines began with a commission for its magazine Mir Iskusstva. He later also contributed essays on Russian folk art. Artistic designs for other magazines such as Dog Rose (Шиповник) and productions of a Moscow publishing house followed.

After graduating in May 1901, Bilibin went to Munich, where he completed his training with the painter Anton Ažbe.

In the period 1902 to 1904, working under the Russian Museum (Museum of His Imperial Majesty Alexander III) Bilibin traveled to the Vologda, Olonetsk, and Arkhangelsk Governorates, performing ethnographic research and studying examples of Russian wooden architecture. In 1904 he published his findings in the monograph Folk Arts of the Russian North. Old Russian art had a great influence on his work. Another influence on his art was traditional Japanese prints and Renaissance woodcuts. On 16 December 1903 Bilibin became one of the founding members of the Union of Russian Artists.

During the Russian Revolution of 1905, Bilibin drew revolutionary cartoons, especially for the magazine Zhupel (Жупелъ), which in 1906 was banned because of his illustration depicting the emperor as a donkey. In 1909 Bilibin served as the designer for the first stage production of Nikolai Rimsky-Korsakov's The Golden Cockerel.

In 1910, Bilibin left the Union of Russian Artists, as a result of differences in approach to their creative work.

In 1911, Bilibin was hired by the State Paper Manufacturing Section to illustrate ball programs, exhibition and book posters, postcards for the Red Cross's Society of St. Eugenia, and envelopes and stationery with the Russian Bogatyrs.

In March 1916 Bilibin was elected chairman of the World of Art group.

On 22 September 1917, shortly before the October Revolution, Bilibin left Petrograd for Crimea, where he lived and worked until September 1919. He moved to Rostov-on-Don in October, and Novorossiysk in December 1919.

=== Egypt ===
On 13 March 1920, fleeing the Russian Civil War, Bilibin arrived in Alexandria where he spent quarantine, before moving to the Tell El Kebir refugee camp. In May, he settled in Cairo. In Cairo, he painted for the Greek colony, specialising in the Byzantine style art that was in demand by the Greek colony for icons and frescoes. He painted Egyptian landscapes, and studied Egyptian, Coptic and Arab art. He was also enraptured by the architecture of mosques and their "head-spinning ornamentation".

In the Summer on 1924, Bilbin, his wife and step-son travelled to Palestine and Syria, where he painted landscapes.

On his return to Egypt in October 1924, Bilibin settled in Alexandria.

=== France ===
In August 1925, Bilibin and his family moved to Paris, where he took to decorating private houses and Orthodox churches. The catalyst to the move was to attend the World Exhibition in Paris.

=== Return to Russia ===
On 16 September 1936, Bilibin and his family returned to the Soviet Union, arriving in Leningrad. Three days later, Bilibin was appointed professor of graphic art at the Leningrad Institute of Painting, Sculpture and Architecture at the All-Russian Academy of Arts. He remained in position until his death.

On 15 March 1937, Bilibin joined the Artists' Union of the USSR.

On 7 February 1942, Bilibin died during the Siege of Leningrad, starving within the city when he refused to leave, and was buried in a collective grave.

Logo of the magazine and "Sic transit ..." Жупел (журнал) (Bogeyman) (Jupel/Zhupel), 1905

== Personal life ==
On 28 April 1902, Bilibin married his former student and fellow pupil at the Tenisheva studio, Anglo-Russian painter and illustrator of children's stories Maria Chambers. They had two sons; Alexander (9 January 1903 – 1972; artist) and Ivan (1908–1993; journalist).

At the end of 1912, Bilibin entered a common law marriage with former student and artist Renée O'Connell (although Bilibin was still legally married to his first wife, Maria Chambers). Bilibin was 15 years her senior, and together they travelled around the Crimean peninsula to draw.

By 1917, the relationship struggled due to Bilibin's drinking. The couple entered an agreement, witnessed by their friend musician Stepan Stepanovich Mitusov, that if Bilibin did not drink for a year, then O'Connell would stay with him. Bilibin did not keep his word, and O'Connell left Bilibin in September 1917, with Bilibin travelling to Crimea alone following the events of the Russian Revolution.

Mitusov wrote a comic poem about the breakdown of the couple's relationship. (Note: Билъ и Бин друзьями были./ Ах, связал их тесно Р. О. К./ С колыбели вместе жили/ И друг друга так любили,/ Что ни Билъ один не мог/ Жить без Бина, ниже Бин/ Быть без Биля день один./ Горький пьяница безбожник,/ Билъ - гуляка, весельчак,/ Бин - поэт, большой художник,/ И в музыке не сапожник./ Не могли они никак/ Рисовать без Биля Бин,/ Бин без Биля пить один./ Так друзьями вместе жили/ Билъ и Бин: связал их Р. О. К./ Рисовали, пели, пили/ И друг друга так любили,/ Что ни Билъ один не мог/ Жить без Бина, ниже Бин/ Быть без Биля день один.)

Bilibin wrote to Maria Chambers in 1922, asking for a divorce (in order for Bilibin to marry Shchekatikhina), to which she did not respond. However, they were divorced by 1923.

In February 1923 he married the painter Aleksandra Shchekatikhina-Pototskaya, with whom he had a joint exhibition in Amsterdam in 1929.

== Publications ==
- Bilibin, Ivan (1904), Народное творчество русского Севера [Folk Arts of the Russian North] (in Russian)

Folktales published by the "Department for the Production of State Documents"

- Сказка об Иване-царевиче, Жар-птице и о Сером волке [The Tale of Ivan the Tsar's Son, The Firebird and the Grey Wolf] (in Russian), [N.p.] Izdanie Ekspeditsii zagotovleniia gosudarstvennykh bumag, 1899 . alt link
- Василиса Прекрасная [Vassilisa the Beautiful] (in Russian), 1899, archived from the original on 2020-08-12
- Царевна-Лягушка [The Frog Princess] (in Russian), 1899
- Перышко Финиста Ясна-Сокола [The Feather of Finist the Falcon] (in Russian), 1900
- Марья Моревна [Maria Morevna] (in Russian), [N.p.] Izdanie Ekspeditsii zagotovleniia gosudarstvennykh' bumag, 1901
- Сестрица Аленушка и братец Иванушка [Sister Alenushka and Brother Ivanushka] (in Russian), 1901–1902
- Белая уточка [The Little White Duck] (in Russian), 1902
- "Былина "Вольга"" [The epic "Volga"], Семья,дети (in Russian), 1903, archived from the original on 2021-01-28 , pdf
- Collections in translated tales :
  - Wheeler, Post, ed. (1917), Russian Wonder Tales , twelve selected illustrations
  - Afanasyev, Alexander (1996), Russkie narodnye skazki - Russian Fairy Tales (in Russian and English) , selection from "State Department" work (1899-1902) that includes Sister Alionushka..; Tsarevich Ivan, the Firebird, and the Grey Wolf; The Frog Tsarevna; Vasilisa..; Feather of Finist; White Duck; and Maria Morevna. Main illustrations only

Illustrations of Pushkin's tales

- Pushkin, Alexander (1834), Сказка о золотом петушке [The Tale of the Golden Cockerel] (in Russian)
- Pushkin, Alexander (1905) [1831], Сказка о царе Салтане [The Tale of Tsar Saltan] (in Russian)
- Pushkin, Alexander, Сказка о рыбаке и рыбке [The Tale of the Fisherman and the Fish] (in Russian) , unpublished
- Pushkin, Alexander, Руслан и Людмила [Ruslan and Ludmilla] (in Russian)

Other

- Roslavlev, A.S. (1911), Сказки [Fairy Tales] (in Russian)
- Поди туда — не знаю куда, принеси то — не знаю что… [Go there - I do not know where, bring that - I do not know what ...] (in Russian), 1919 , unpublished
- Contes de l'Isba [Tales from a Hut] (in French), 1931
- Carpenter, Francis (1932–1933), Tales of a Russian Grandmother
- Contes de la couleuvre [Tales of the Snake] (in French), 1932
- Conte du petit poisson d'or [Tale of the little Golden Fish] (in French), 1933
- Le Tapis Volant [The Flying Carpet] (in French), 1924
- Le farouche Abd-el-Kader (in French), 1936
- Adhémar de Montgon. Henri IV (in French), 1936
- Anderson, H.C. (1937), The Little Mermaid (in Russian)
- Percheron, M. (1937), Moscou (in French)
- Tolstoy, A.N., Петр Первый [Peter the Great] (in Russian)
- Песнь про царя Ивана Васильевича, молодого опричника и удалого купца Ивана Калашникова [A song about Tsar Ivan Vasilyevich, a young oprichnik and the successful merchant Ivan Kalashnikov] (in Russian), 1939
- Vodovozov, N.V. (1940), Слово о стольном Киеве и о русских богатырях [Stories of the capital Kiev and Russian Heroes] (in Russian)

== Gallery ==
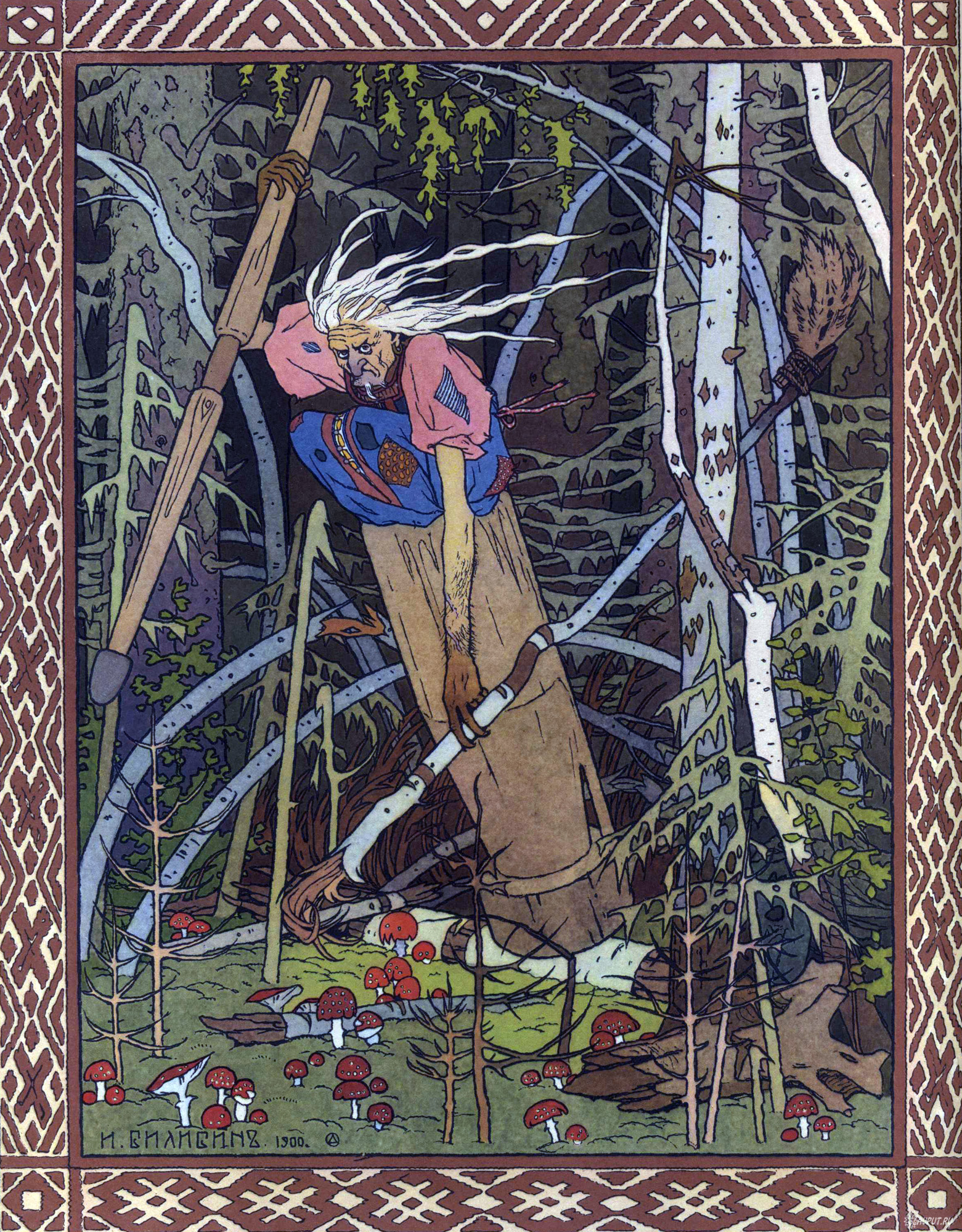
Baba Yaga from Vasilisa the Beautiful, 1899

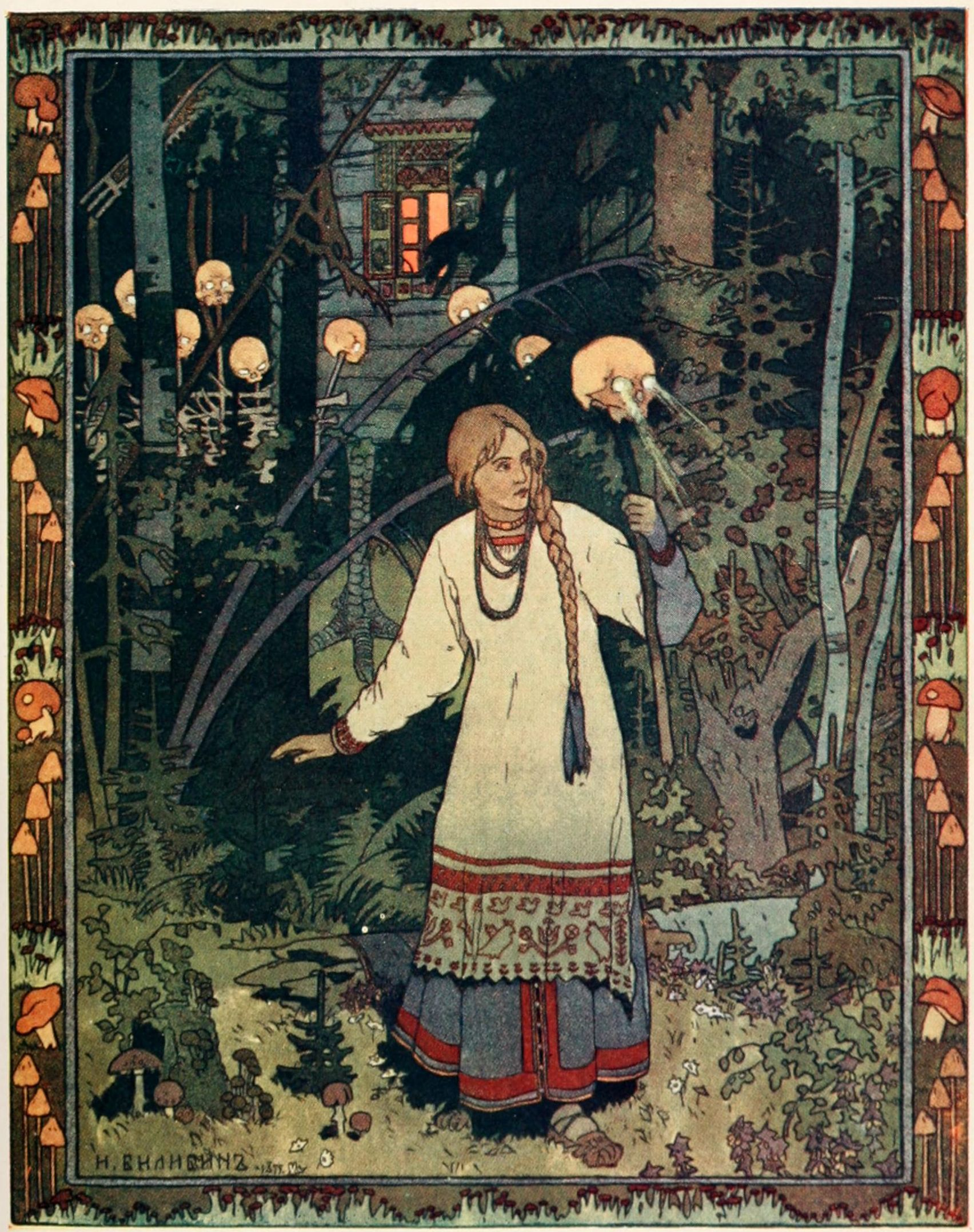
Vasilisa the Beautiful, 1899

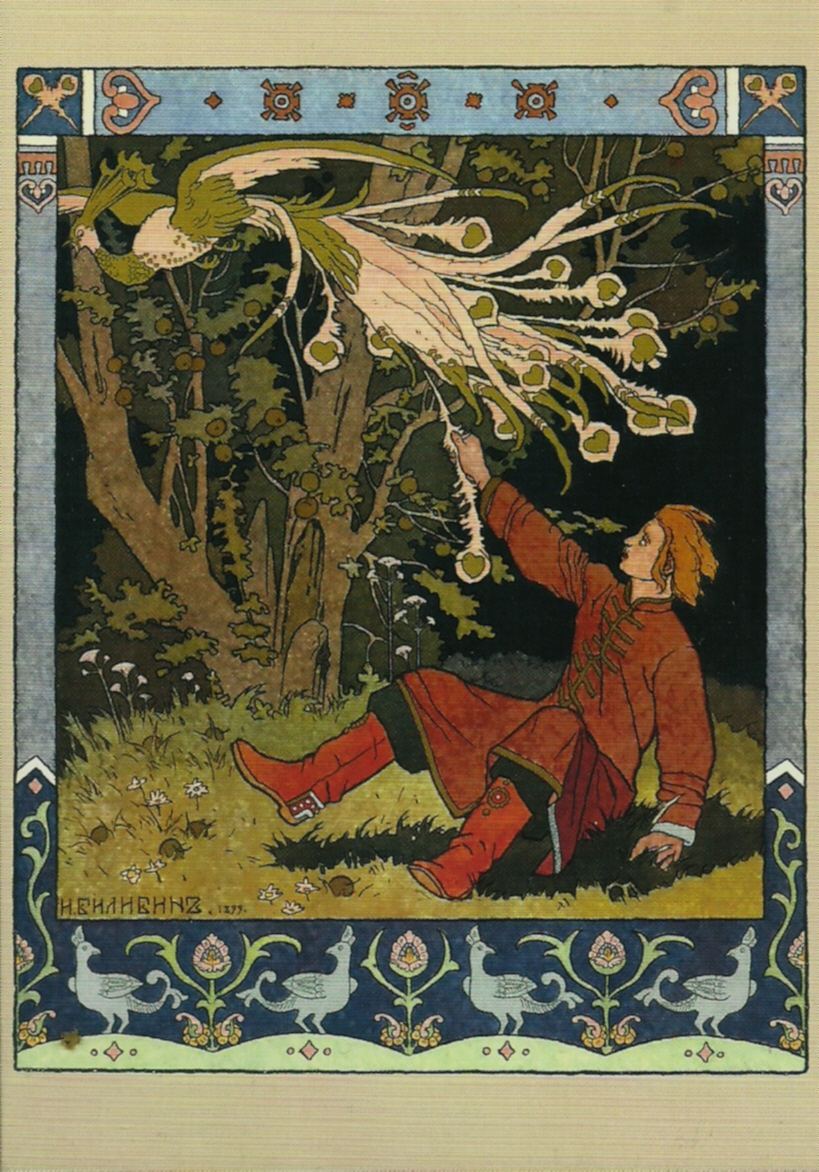
Ivan Tsarevich catching the Firebird's feather, 1899

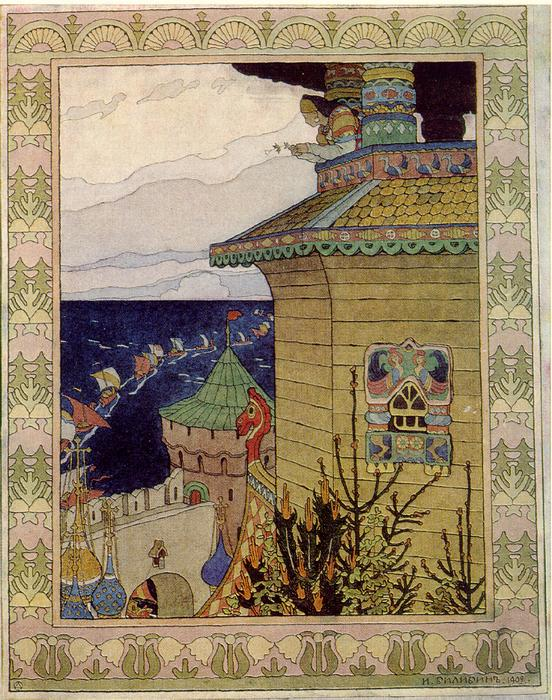
Sadko, 1902

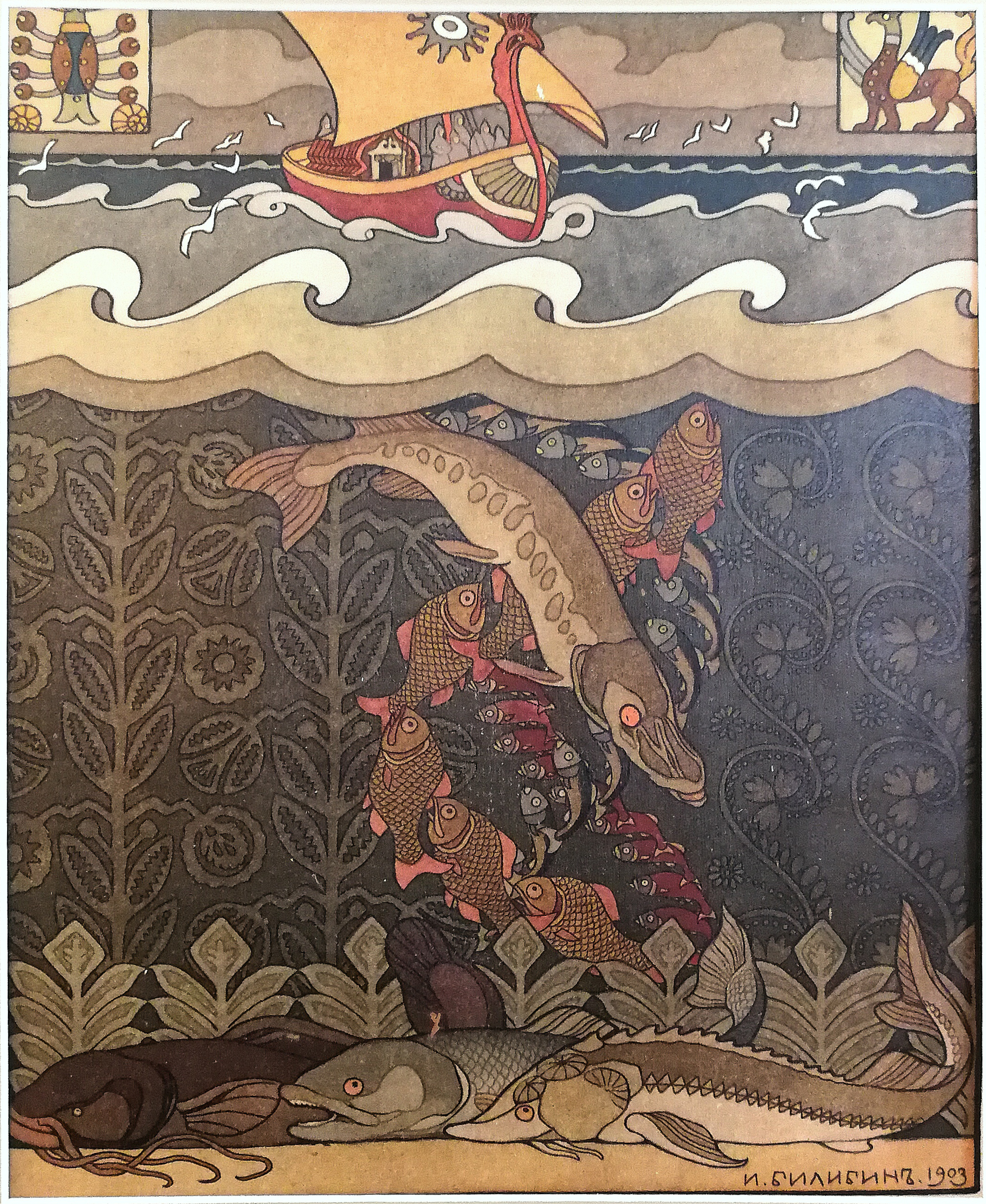
Illustration from Volga, 1904

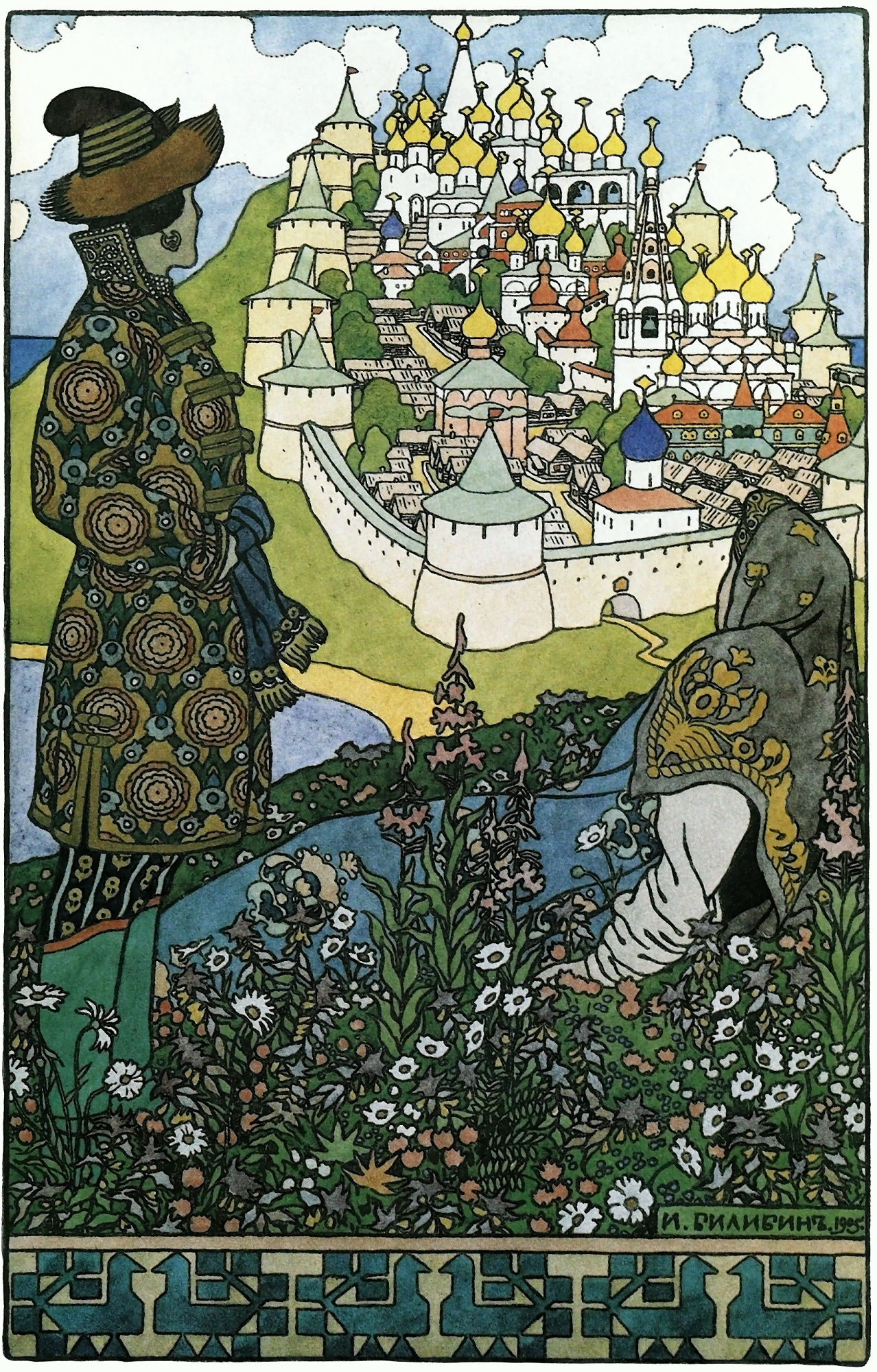
The Island of Buyan, 1905

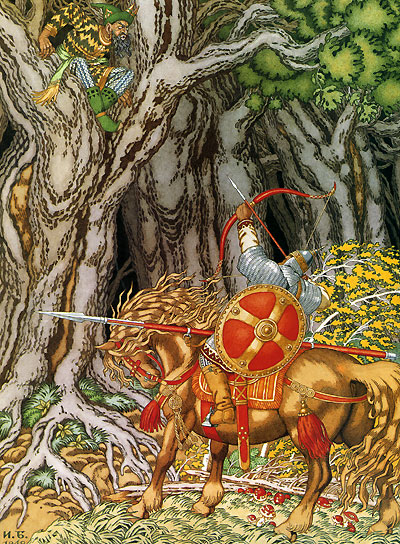
Ilya Muromets and Nightingale the Robber

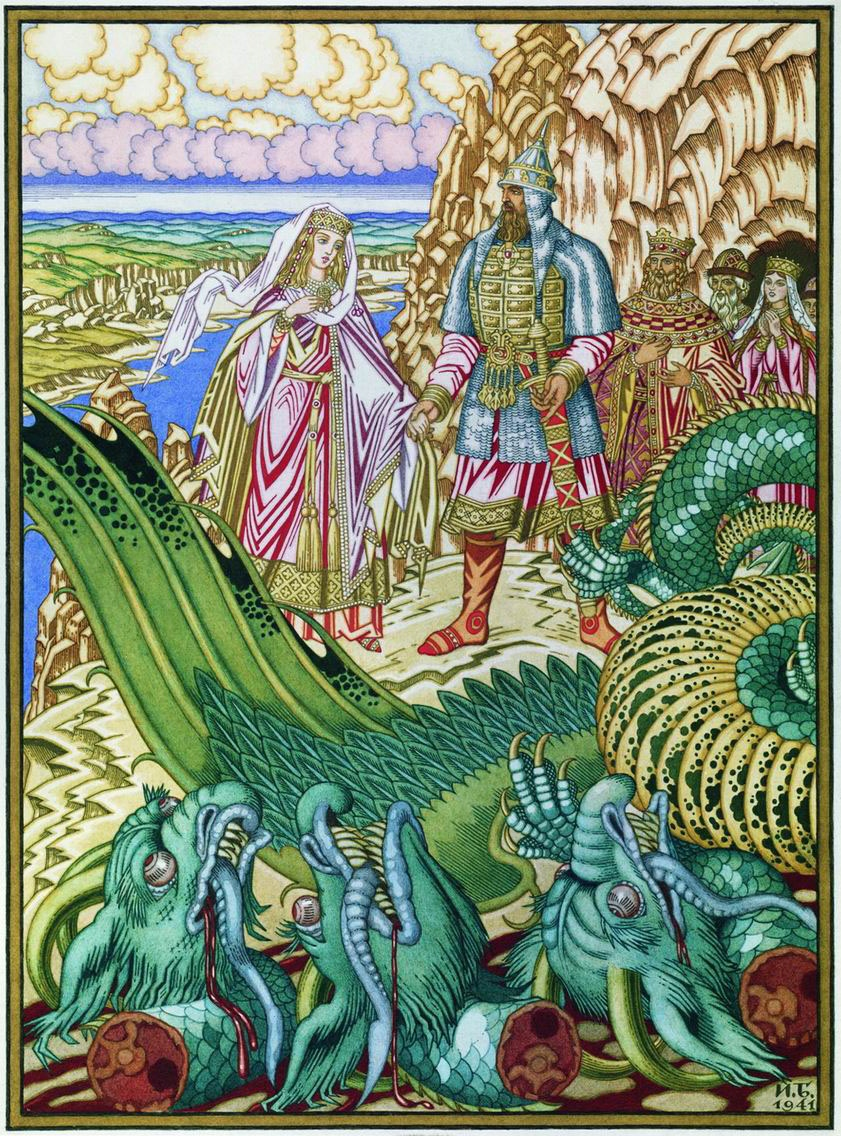
Dobrynya Nikitich rescues Zabava from the Gorynych, 1941

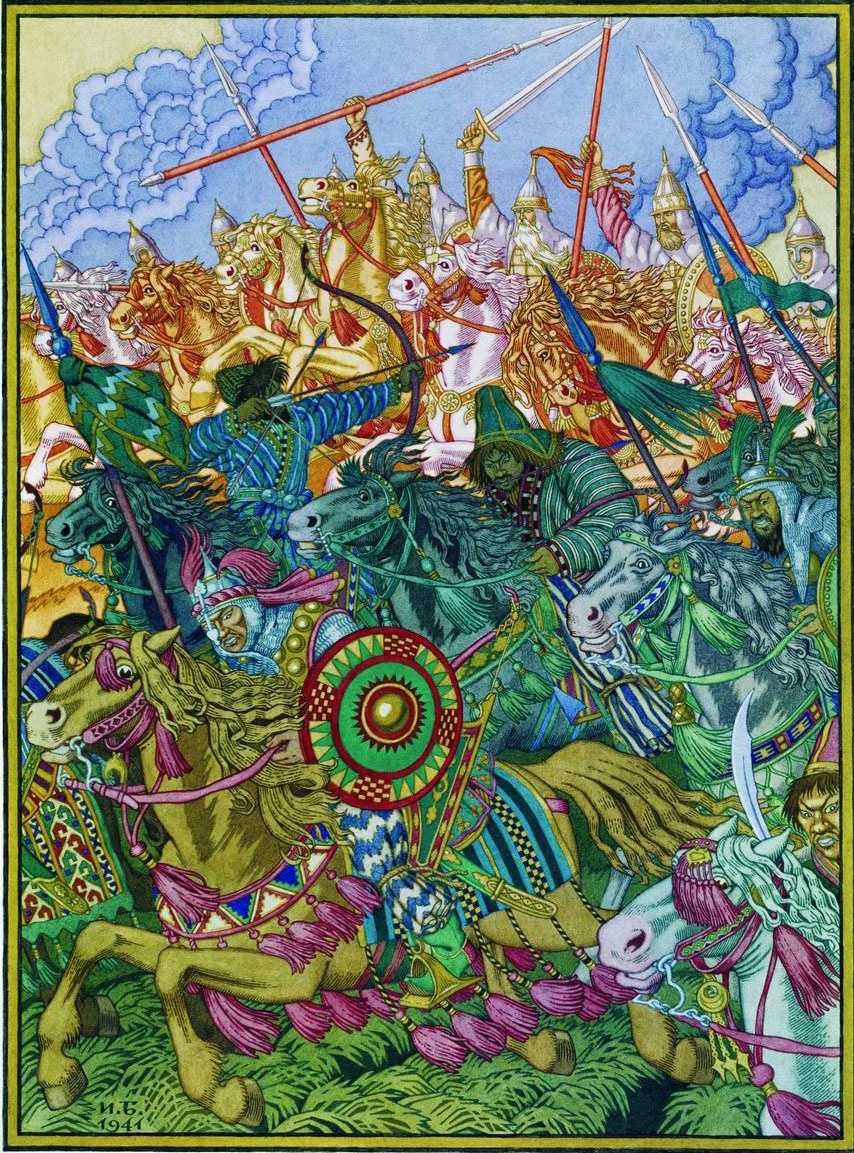
The Tale of Igor's Campaign, 1941
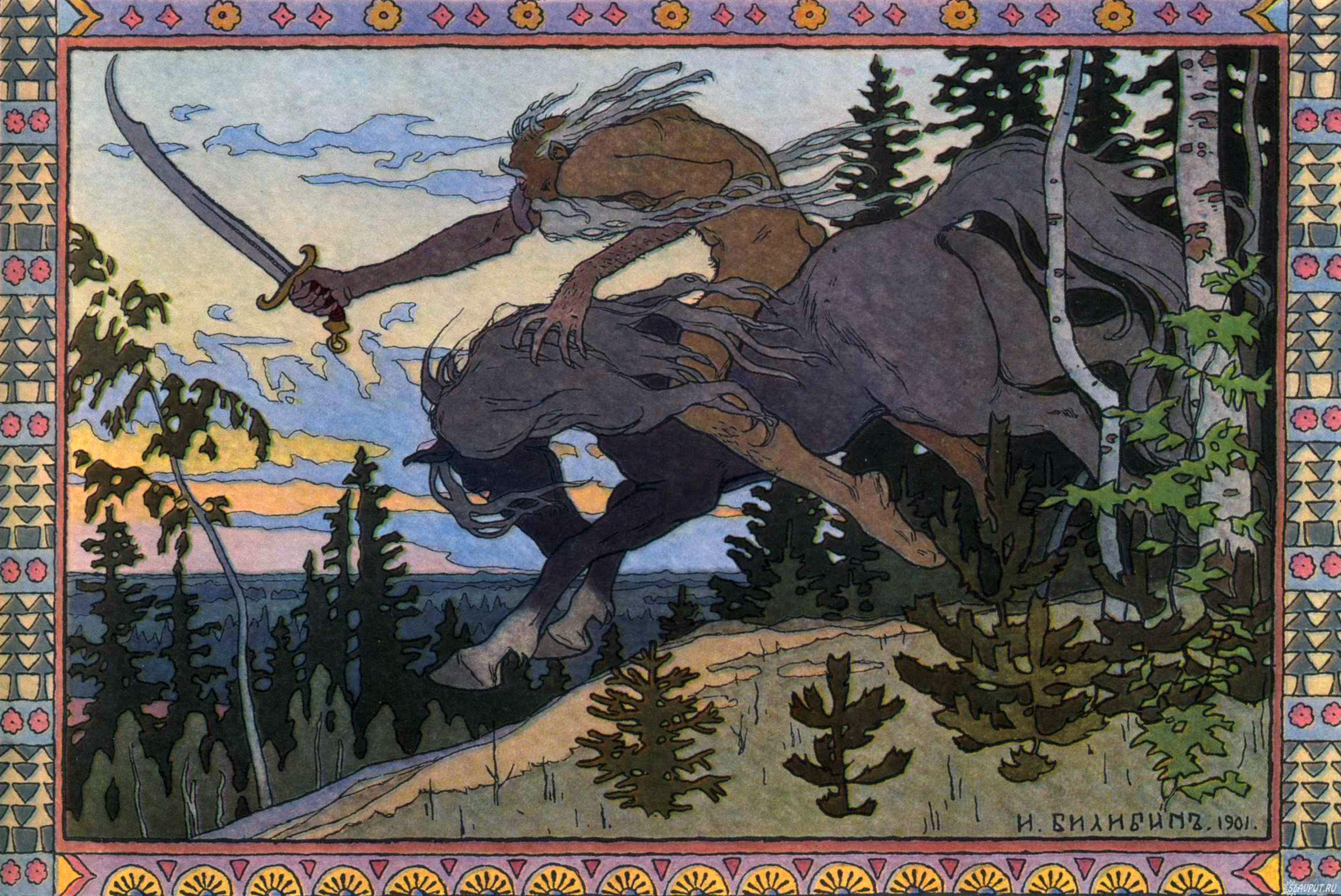
Koschei the Deathless (from Marya Morevna, 1900)

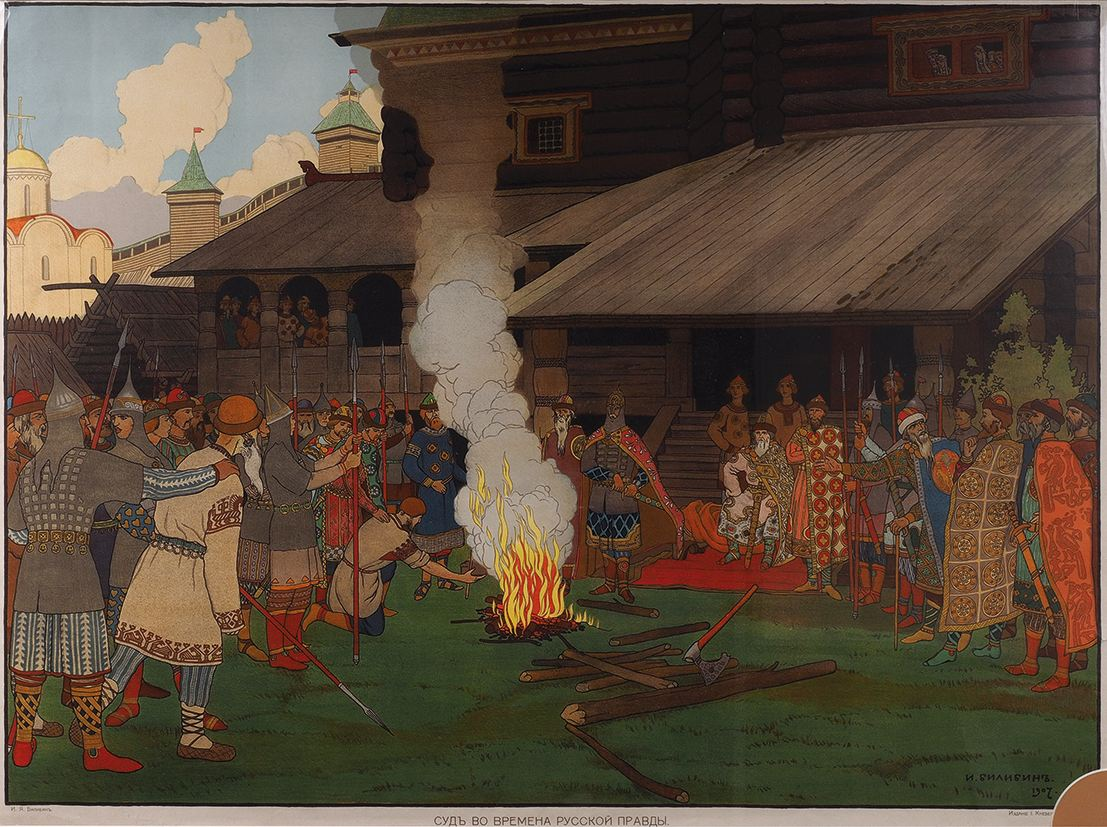
Administering Justice in Kievan Rus, 1907

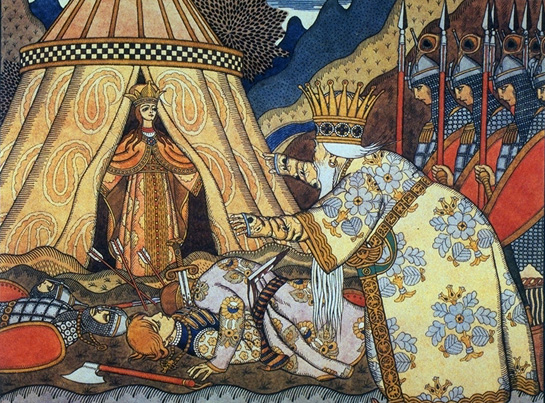
Tsar Dadon meets the Shemakha tsaritsa (illustration to The Tale of the Golden Cockerel, 1907)
