= Three Palms =

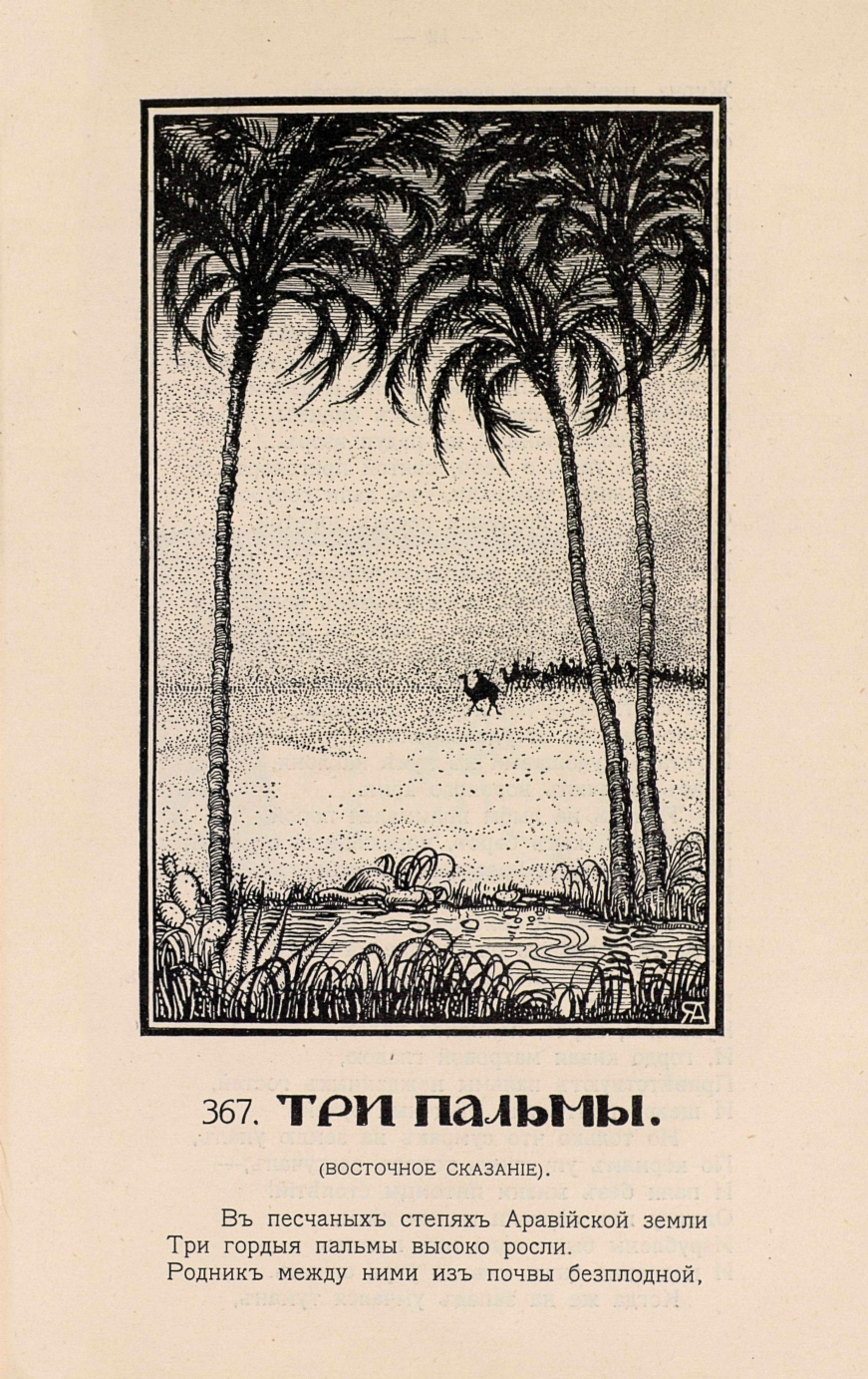
ИПСС III с.11 Три пальмы 1

Three Palms (Три Пальмы) is one of the most famous poetic works of the Russian poet Mikhail Lermontov. The poem was created in 1839. It was published for the first time in the literary magazine Domestic notes 1839, volume V, #8, section III, p. 168-170. The poem appeared in the Collected works of M. Lermontov published by Elias Glazunov and Co. in 1840. Lermontov composed the poem in amphibrach tetrameter, the same meter and strophe used by Alexander Pushkin in his Imitation of the Koran, part IX, "And a weary traveler murmured to God..."
