= Vladimir Izdebskiy =

Russian sculptor

Vladimir Izdebskiy was a sculptor born on June 3, 1882, in Kiev, Ukraine. He attended Odessa Art School from 1901 to 1903. In 1903 he moved to Munich to study at the Academy of Art. After taking part in the 1905 Russian uprisings he was expelled from the school. He then moved to Russia. In 1907 he returned to Odessa and began to give drawing lessons. He also started creating sculptures at that time. In 1909 Izdebskiy formed the Izdebskiy Salon, a place where artists from Russia and abroad could meet. He later fled from Petrograd to reunite with the rest of his family in Paris. In 1941, during World War II, Izdebskiy fled France and lived in New York from that point on. He died August 20, 1965.
