= Benois =

Benois is a surname that may refer to:

- Any of the Benois family of Russian artists, musicians, and architects, some of whose members are:
- Nicholas Benois (1813–1898), Russian architect
- Albert Nikolayevitch Benois (1852–1936), Russian water-colorist, son of Nicholas Benois
- Leon Benois (1856–1928), Russian architect, son of Nicholas Benois
- Alexandre Benois (1870–1960), Russian painter and stage designer, son of Nicholas Benois
