= Nikolay Lanceray =

Russian architect (1879–1942)

- Born: Nikolay Evgenievich Lanceray; 26 April 1879; Saint Petersburg, Russian Empire
- Died: 6 May 1942 (aged 63); Saratov, Russian SFSR, Soviet Union
- Occupation: Architect

Nikolay Evgenievich Lanceray (Russian: Николай Евгеньевич Лансере; 26 April 1879 – 6 May 1942) was a Russian architect, preservationist, illustrator of books and historian of neoclassical art, biographer of Charles Cameron, Vincenzo Brenna and Andreyan Zakharov. Lanceray was associated with Mir Iskusstva art circle and was a proponent of Russian neoclassical revival school.

== Biography ==
Lanceray was a son of sculptor Eugene Lanceray (senior, 1848–1886) and Yekaterina Benois (daughter of architect Nikolay Benois). His father died when he was six; he and five his siblings were raised by the Benois family and lived most of their childhood at grandfather's Saint Petersburg place. Lanceray completed high school in 1898 and joined the Imperial Academy of Arts, where his illustrious uncle Leon Benois chaired one of three architectural workshops. Lanceray graduated from the Academy in 1904.

In 1903, Lanceray, Vladimir Shchuko and Ludwig Shroeter settled on a long survey tour of Pskov and Novgorod regions; Mir Iskusstva published Vandalism in Novgorod and Pskov governorates (Вандализм в Новгородской и Псковской губерниях) by Lanceray and Schuko in 1907. He worked as a practical architect in Moscow and as restorator in Saint Petersburg. Soon, however, he quit construction for historical studies of Russian Enlightenment, and co-authored Tsarskoye Selo in the reigh of Elizabeth, contributing over 200 graphical sheets. He was a regular author of Starye Gody magazine that published his 1911 biography of Andreyan Zakharov and 1912–1913 essays on Gatchina Palace and Tsarskoye Selo. Lanceray continued collecting material on neoclassical architects, primarily Brenna, Cameron and Zakharov, until his arrest in 1931.

From 1925 to 1928, Lanceray and French architect Jessel worked on redesigning ship interiors at Northern Wharf. This collaboration was used by OGPU as a pretext for arresting both artists. Lanceray was arrested on 2 March 1931, charged with "espionage for France" and sentenced to death, commuted to 10 years of hard labor. Instead of GULAG camps, he ended up in a Leningrad-based architectural sharashka. From July 1931 to June 1935, Lanceray was involved in numerous NKVD-sponsored projects; he is credited with designing interiors of coast guard ships, Moscow Kremlin offices, aluminum smelters and apartment blocks in Moscow and Leningrad. Lanceray's prison drafts, signed in his own name, participated in public architectural contests, as if the architect was still free.

Isaac Brodsky, Ivan Fomin, Alexey Shchusev, Vladimir Shchuko and other influential artists pleaded in favor of Lanceray, and he was released in August 1935. Freedom spelled bitter dissatisfaction to Lanceray: while he was behind bars, the Academy of Architecture commissioned biographies of Cameron and Zakharov to other writers. He still managed to sign a contract for a biography of Vincenzo Brenna.

For three following years, Lanceray chaired an architectural workshop on site of Experimental Medicine Institute (Leningrad), collecting pieces of information for his book on Brenna. He was regularly harassed by NKVD searches and interrogations. In May 1938, Lanceray sent the final version of Vincenzo Brenna to the publisher; ten days later he was arrested, again for espionage charges. Lanceray broke down under torture and pleaded guilty; this time, he was sentenced for five years in Kotlas. In 1941, the Kotlas camp was herded, on foot, to Moscow; fellow inmates carried ailing Lanceray on their shoulders. The foot march was followed with rail transport to Saratov; there, Lanceray suffered a heart attack and died on 6 May 1942.

Espionage sentences against Lanceray were lifted posthumously in 1957; first edition of Vincenzo Brenna was published in 2006.

== Sources ==
- Vityazeva, V. A., Modzalevskaya, M. A. (2006, in Russian) Istorik russkoy arhitektury Nikolay Lanceray (Историк русской культуры Николай Лансере)
  - in: Lanceray, Nikolay (2006). Vincenzo Brenna (Винченцо Бренна) (in Russian). Saint Petersburg: Kolo. ISBN 5-901841-34-4.
