= Benois family =

Family of prominent 19th- and 20th-century Russian artists, musicians and architects

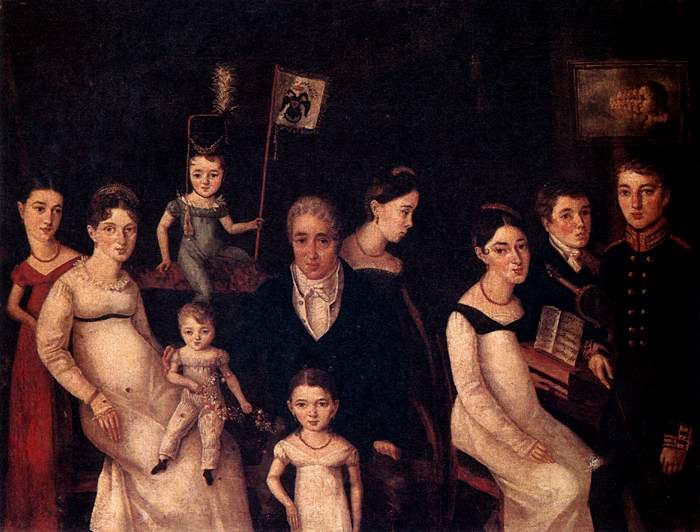
Portrait of the Benois family, c. 1816, showing parents Louis and Ekaterina Benois surrounded by their eight children Jeannette (b. 1798), Mikhail (b. 1799), Leonty (b. 1801), Alexandrina (b. 1803), Elizaveta (b. 1806), Elena (b. 1807), Nicholas (b. 1813) and François (b. 1814).

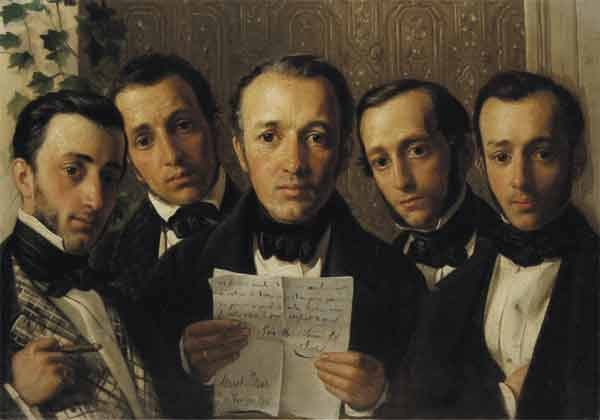
Benois Brothers by Mikhail Scotti, 1847. From left to right: Julius (b. 1820), Nicholas (b. 1813), Leonty (b. 1801), François (b. 1814), and Alexander (b. 1817)

The Benois family (Russian: Бенуа, romanized: Benua) was a family of prominent 19th and 20th century Russian artists, musicians and architects, descended from French confectioner Louis Jules (Leonty Nikolaevich) Benois (1770/1772?–1822), cook-confectioner to the Duke of Montmorency, who moved to Russia in 1794 after the French Revolution and became a royal headwaiter.

Famous members of the Benois family include:

- Mikhail Benois (1799–1861), colonel, tutor at the Corps of Pages.
- Leonty Benois (1801–1883), "the first doctor" in St.Petersburg.
- Nicholas Leontievich Benois (1813–1898), Russian architect. Designed several buildings for the Imperial Family at Peterhof.
  - Nicholas' son Albert Nikolayevich Benois (1852–1936), Russian water-colourist.
    - Albert's daughter Camille Evgenia Benois (1878-1959), artist, married Gen. Dimitri Leonidovitch Horvath (1859-1937) who was General Manager of the Chinese Eastern Railway and a direct descendant of Field Marshal Mikhail Kutuzov (1745-1813).
    - Albert's son Nikolai Albertovich Benois married Maria Nikolayevna Kuznetsova (1880–1966), a famous Russian opera singer.
    - Albert's daughter Maria Albertovna Benois married Russian composer, pianist, and conductor Nikolai Nikolayevich Tcherepnin (1873–1945), also spelled Cherepnin. They were the parents of Alexander Nikolayevich Tcherepnin (1899–1977), composer and pianist whose son Ivan Alexandrovich Tcherepnin (1943–1998) was also a talented composer.
  - Nicholas' son Leon Nikolayevich "Leonty" Benois (1856–1928), Russian architect. He helped design the St. Petersburg Court Choir Chapel (now the Mikhail Glinka Academic Choir.
    - Leon's daughter Nadezhda ('Nadia') Leontievna Benois (1895–1975), illustrator and graphic designer, was the mother of British actor Sir Peter Ustinov (1921–2004).
  - Nikolai's daughter Camilla Nikolayevna Benois married a British immigrant, Matthew Edward Edwards. Their daughter Camilla Matveevna Edwards married Armenian architect Alexander Tamanian (1878–1936), whose sons Georgi Tamanian (1910–1993) and Julius (Yuliy) Tamanian (1922-1993) were also prominent Armenian architects.
  - Nicholas' daughter Ekaterina Nikolayevna "Katherine" Benois (b. 1850) married sculptor Eugene Lanceray (aka. "Yevgeny Alexandrovich Lansere") (1848–1886).
    - Their son Yevgeny Yevgenievich Lanceray (1875–1946), Russian graphic artist, painter, illustrator.
    - Their son Nikolay Lanceray (1879–1942), Russian architect, illustrator and biographer.
    - Their daughter Zinaida Serebriakova née Lanceray (1884–1967), Russian portrait painter, was mother of architect Yevgeny Borisovich Serebriakov (1906–1990) and artists Alexander Borisovich Serebriakov (1907–1994), Tatiana Borisovna Serebriakova (1912–1989), and Ekaterina Borisovna Serebriakova (1913–2014).
  - Nicholas' son Alexander Nikolayevich Benois (1870–1960), painter, theatrical designer, art
    - Alexander's daughter Yelena Alexandrovna Benois-Clément (1898–1972) was a talented painter whose first husband was composer Ivan Wyschnegradsky (1893–1979).
    - Alexander's son Nicola Alexandrovich Benois (1901–1988) was a principal theatrical designer at La Scala in Milan.

== Sources ==
- "Бенуа, художники" . Brockhaus and Efron Encyclopedic Dictionary (in Russian). 1906.
