= Nicolas Benois =

Nicolas Benois may refer to:

- Nicholas Benois (1813–1898), Russian architect
- Nicola Alexandrovich Benois (1901–1988), Russian-born Italian scenographer and costume designer
