= Benua =

Benua may refer to:

- 5419 Benua, an asteroid
- Benua (protist), a Peronosporaceae oomycete
- Russian-language rendering of the French surnames Benois, Benoit, or Benoist:
  - Alexander Benua or Alexandre Benois (1870–1960), Russian artist, art critic, historian, preservationist
  - Alexander Benua (general) (1862–1944) General of the Russian Imperial Army
  - Irina Benua (1912–2004) Soviet and Russian architect-restorer
