= Jona von Ustinov =

German journalist and diplomat (1892–1962)

Jona "Klop" von Ustinov
- Born: 2 December 1892; Jaffa, Mutasarrifate of Jerusalem, Ottoman Empire
- Died: 1 December 1962 (aged 69); Eastleach, Gloucestershire, England
- Education: Grenoble University, University of Berlin
- Occupations: Journalist, diplomat
- Spouse: Nadezhda L. Benois (m. 1920)
- Children: Peter Ustinov
- Parent(s): Plato von Ustinov; Magdalena Hall
- Relatives: Tamara Ustinov (granddaughter)

Jona Freiherr von Ustinov (Russian: Иона Платонович Устинов, romanized: Iona Platonovich Ustinov; 2 December 1892 – 1 December 1962), often known as Klop Ustinov (Клоп Устинов), was a German journalist and diplomat who worked for MI5 during the time of the Nazi regime. His father was the Russian-born emigre Baron Plato von Ustinov (1840–1918). His son was the actor Sir Peter Ustinov.

== Early life ==
Ustinov was born Jonah Freiherr von Ustinow in Jaffa, Palestine, then part of the Ottoman Empire, the son of Plato von Ustinov, a former Russian officer and naturalised citizen of the Kingdom of Württemberg who had married Magdalena Hall, then living in Jaffa, the daughter of the Ethiopian court lady Katharina Hall, also known as Welette-Iyesus and her husband, Moritz Hall, a Jewish-born convert to Protestantism, cannon-caster of Tewodros II of Ethiopia and missionary of St. Chrischona Pilgrim Mission in Ethiopia, and later in Jaffa. Magdalena and Plato von Ustinov (sometimes transcribed as "Ustinow") had five children, of whom Jona/Jonah was the eldest.

There is a family photograph that shows Magdalena von Ustinov (née Hall) with her husband and their children, including Jona/Jonah, who disliked his forename so much that he chose the nickname "Klop" ("Bedbug" in Russian) by which he was known to his friends and relatives for the rest of his life.

Ustinov went to school in Jaffa, where until 1900 his father hosted the school of the Protestant Immanuel congregation in his Hôtel du Parc, later in Düsseldorf, and Yverdon. He studied at Grenoble University, in France, and worked at the University of Berlin before he moved to London. That peripatetic life engendered in Ustinov a cosmopolitan attitude, which made him averse to any kind of nationalism.

== Early career ==
During World War I, Ustinov served in the German Army's Air Service unit Flieger-Abteilung (Artillerie) 250. He was awarded the Württembergian Military Merit Order for his services. His brother Peter von Ustinow joined the same unit and was killed in action on 13 July 1917. After the war Ustinov worked for Wolffs Telegraphisches Bureau, the first German news agency, in Amsterdam.

On 17 July 1920, he married the painter Nadia Benois, daughter of Leon Benois. The Ustinovs returned to London, where Klop became a press officer for the German Embassy. Their son Peter Ustinov was born on 16 April 1921.

His political opinions gave difficulties to Ustinov with the new Nazi government almost immediately. In 1935, the conflict culminated when Ustinov refused to prove that he was not of Jewish descent ("Ariernachweis"). As a result, he lost his job and chose to become a British citizen in 1935, which allowed him to avoid internment and later, during the war, deportation.

== Later career ==
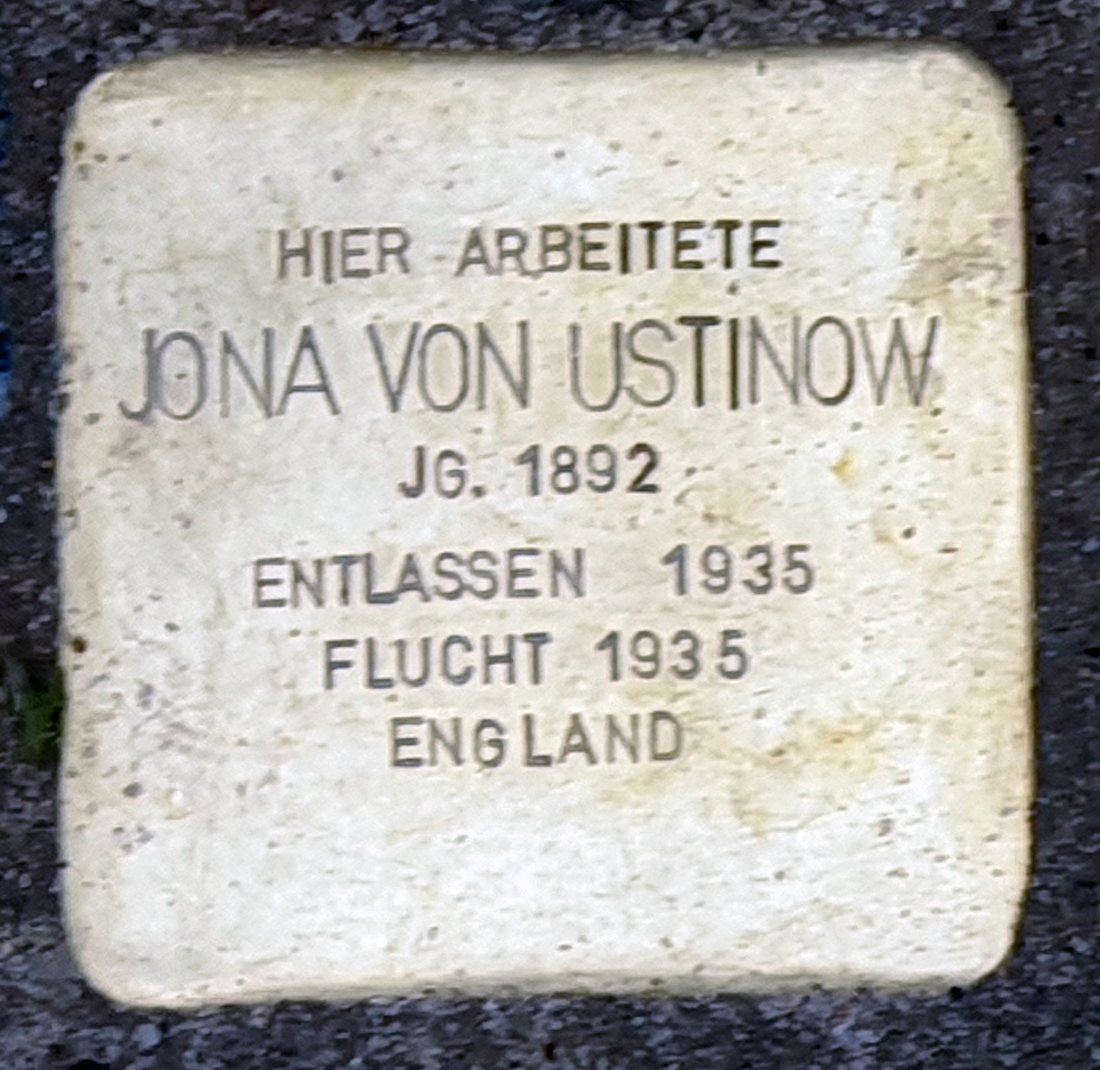
Stolperstein (stumbling block), Jona von Ustinow, Wilhelmstraße 92, Berlin-Mitte, Germany

Meanwhile, he had begun working for the British intelligence service MI5, and hosted secret meetings of senior British officials and German generals at his home on the fourth floor of 34 Redcliffe Gardens, Kensington, London. Notable among these guests were the diplomat Robert Vansittart and Winston Churchill (then out of power). Another was Wolfgang zu Putlitz, a First Secretary of the German Embassy in London who provided detailed information about German rearmament. Former MI5 officer Peter Wright said it was "priceless intelligence, possibly the most important human-source intelligence Britain received in the prewar period".

He also tried to convince the British government to adopt a more robust attitude towards Nazi Germany. Seven months before the occupation of Czechoslovakia in 1939, he was able to acquire the German plans. He later regretted that Prime Minister Neville Chamberlain could not bring himself to take any action.

== Death ==
Ustinov died on 1 December 1962 in Eastleach, Gloucestershire from a massive heart attack. It was the day before his 70th birthday. Administration of his estate was given to his wife, Nadia, on 7 May 1963 – his effects were valued at £1,196.

Peter Wright, author of Spycatcher, alleged that Ustinov had been discovered by another member of the British intelligence community a short time before his death, selling books from his library to supplement his income. According to Wright, Ustinov's pension had been overlooked, and he was almost penniless. Wright says that someone from MI5 did attempt to rectify the situation, but that Ustinov died a short time later and he (Wright) did not know whether or not the problem was corrected.

== See also ==
- St. Chrischona

== Bibliography ==
- Andrew, Christopher (2009). Defend the Realm: The Authorized History of MI5. Knopf Doubleday Publishing. ISBN 9780307272911.
- Day, Peter (2014). Klop: Britain's Most Ingenious Secret Agent. New York: Biteback Publishing. ISBN 978-1849547642. OCLC 881887338. See also retitled edition: Day, Peter (2015). The Bedbug: Klop Ustinov: Britain's Most Ingenious Spy. Biteback. ISBN 978-1849549462. OCLC 926099997.. Presentations and reviews here/here, here, here and Klop: Britain’s Most Ingenious Secret Agent by Peter Day
- Holtz, "Hall, Moritz", in: Encyclopaedia Aethiopica: 3 vols., Siegbert Uhlig (ed.), Wiesbaden: Harrassowitz, 2002, 2005, 2007, Vol. 2 / D – Ha (2005), article: 'Hall, Moritz'. ISBN 3-447-05238-4.
- Smidt, Wolbert G.C. (2005). "Verbindungen der Familie Ustinov nach Äthiopien" [lit. 'Connections of the Ustinov family with Ethiopia'] in: Aethiopica, International Journal of Ethiopian and Eritrean Studies, vol. 8, pp. 29–47.
- Wright, Peter (1987). Spycatcher: The Candid Autobiography of a Senior Intelligence Officer. New York and London: Viking Penguin. ISBN 0670820555.
- Nadia Benois, Klop and the Ustinov Family (1973)

=== Sources ===
- Peter Ustinov, Dear Me, 1977 Pavor S. A.
