= Eugene Lanceray =

Russian artist (1875–1946)

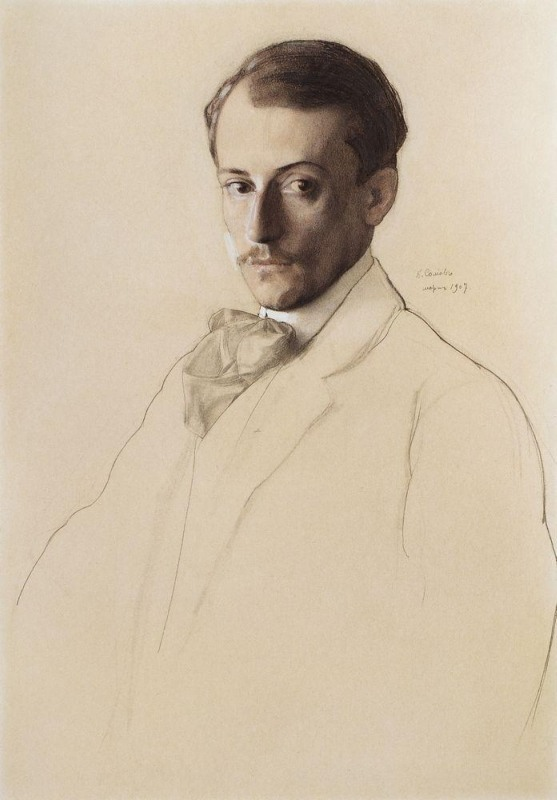
Portrait of Lanceray (1907), by Konstantin Somov.

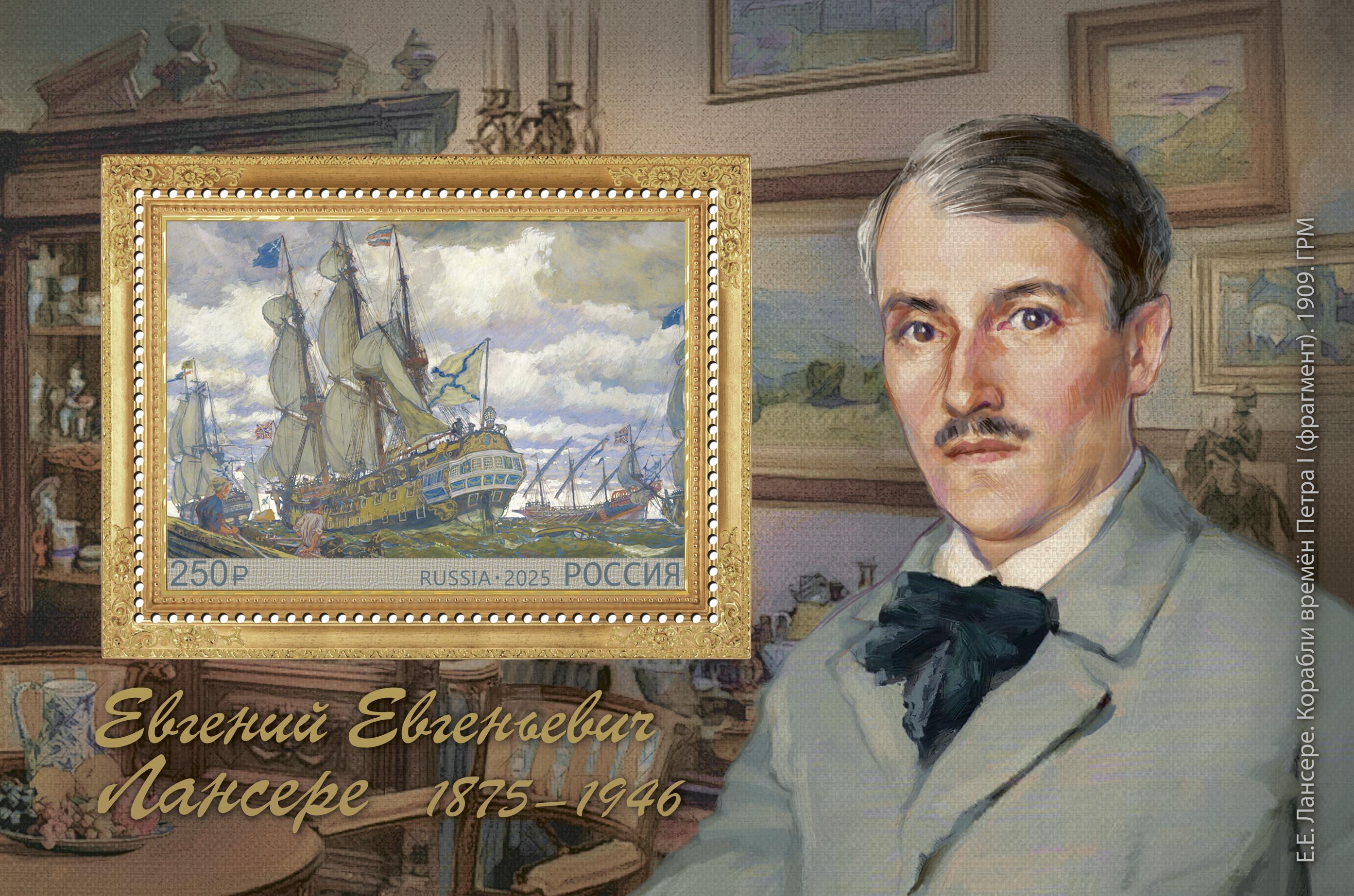
Lanceray and his 1909 work "Ships of Peter the Great's time" on a 2025 Russian sheet of stamps.

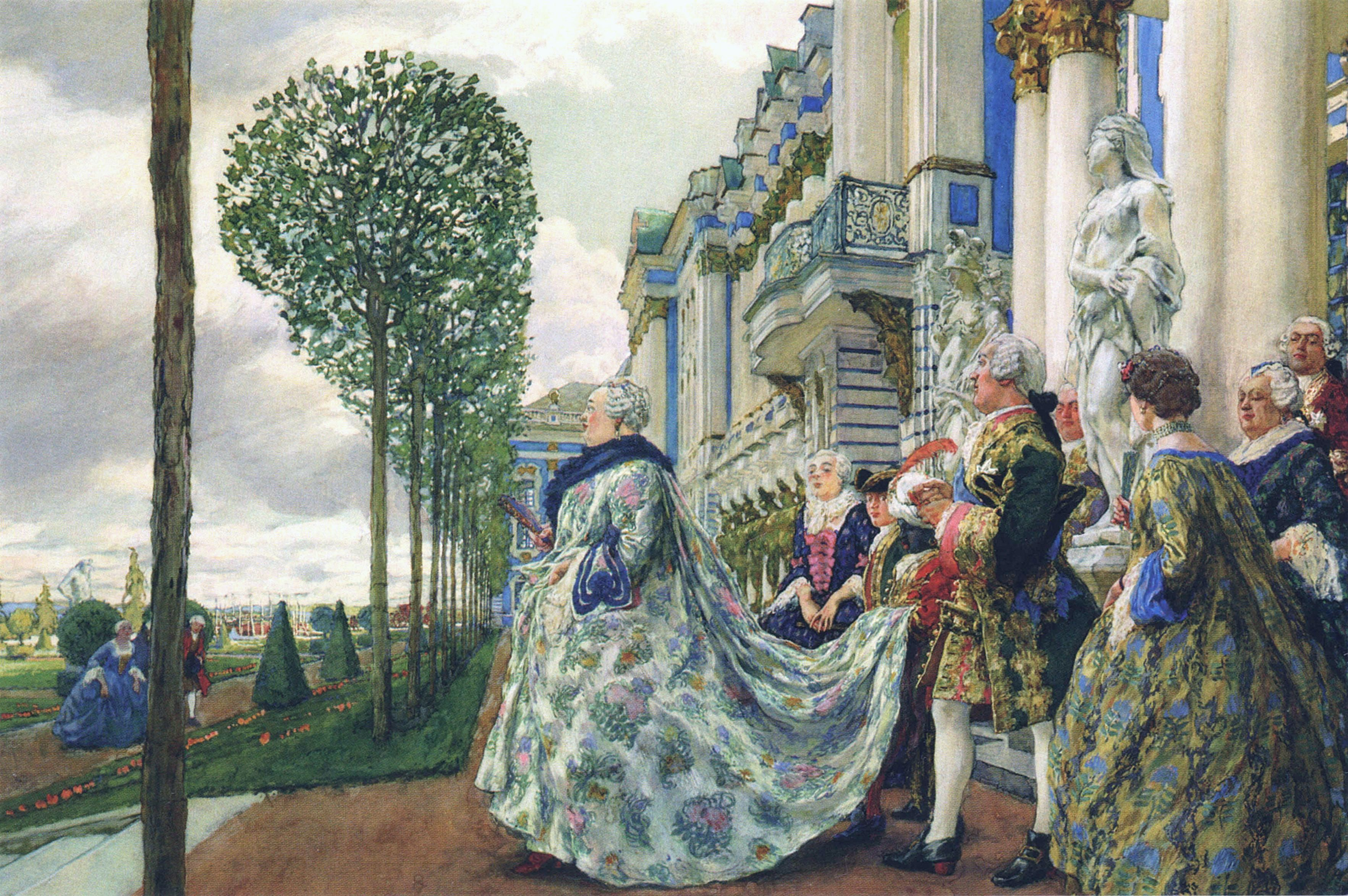
Empress Elizabeth Petrovna at Tsarskoye Selo

Yevgeny Yevgenyevich Lanceray (Russian: Евге́ний Евге́ньевич Лансере́; 4 September [O.S. 23 August] 1875 – 13 September 1946), also often spelled Eugene Lansere, was a Russian painter and draughtsman during the Modernist period, renowned as part of the Mir iskusstva society.

== Early life and education ==
Lanceray was born in Pavlovsk, Russia, a suburb of Saint Petersburg. He came from a prominent Russian artistic family of French origin. His father, Eugeny Lanceray, was a sculptor and also an artist. He died at 40 years old. His grandfather Nicholas Benois, and his uncle Leon Benois, were celebrated architects. Another uncle, Alexandre Benois, was a respected artist, art critic, historian and preservationist. His great-grandfather was Venetian-born Russian composer Catterino Cavos. Lanceray's siblings were also heirs to this artistic tradition. His sister, Zinaida Serebriakova, was a painter, while his brother Nikolay was an architect. His cousin, Nadia Benois, was mother of Peter Ustinov.

The artist spent his childhood in Ukraine, in a small estate of his father called Neskuchnoye. After the death of Eugene Lanceray, the artist's father, mother moved with her children to St. Petersburg, to his father's house, known in art circles as "the house of Benois near Nikola Morskoy" (Russian: Дом Бенуа у Николы Морского).

Lanceray took his first lessons at the Drawing School of the Imperial Society for the Encouragement of the Arts in St. Petersburg from 1892 to 1896, under Jan Ciągliński and Ernst Friedrich von Liphart. He then traveled to Paris, where he continued his studies at the Académie Colarossi and Académie Julian between 1896 and 1899.

== Career before the revolution ==
After returning from France to Russia, Lanceray joined Mir iskusstva, an influential Russian art movement inspired by an artistic journal of the same name, founded in 1899, in Saint Petersburg. Other prominent members of Mir iskusstva included Lanceray's uncle Alexandre Benois, Konstantin Somov, Walter Nouvel, Léon Bakst, and Dmitry Filosofov.

Like other members of Mir iskusstva, he was fascinated with the "sparkling dust" of Rococo art, and often turned to the 18th-century Russian history and art for inspiration.

Eugene Lanceray was younger than the masters of Mir iskusstva and initially acted as their student. His creative method and aesthetic views evolved under the influence and guidance of Benois, although, by some aspects of his talent, Lanceray may have exceeded his teacher. His first significant works in the field of easel painting and graphics were created in the late 1890 and early 1900s. The main creative interests of the artist were turned at that time to the "historical", mainly architectural landscape.

Lanceray's most celebrated mural painting is located at the ceiling of Moscow Kazansky railway station (1933–1934). Besides its place and its scale, the distinctive feature of this work is that it was made using tempera paint, so beloved by the artist. But he worked with various media, and the area of his activity included not only mural art but also fine art, graphics, illustration and theatrical scenery. For the first time, Lanceray took to the work in the theater in early 1900s, paying tribute to the passion for theater painting, which was characteristic of almost all the representatives of the older generation of the Mir iskusstva group.

== Life after the revolution ==
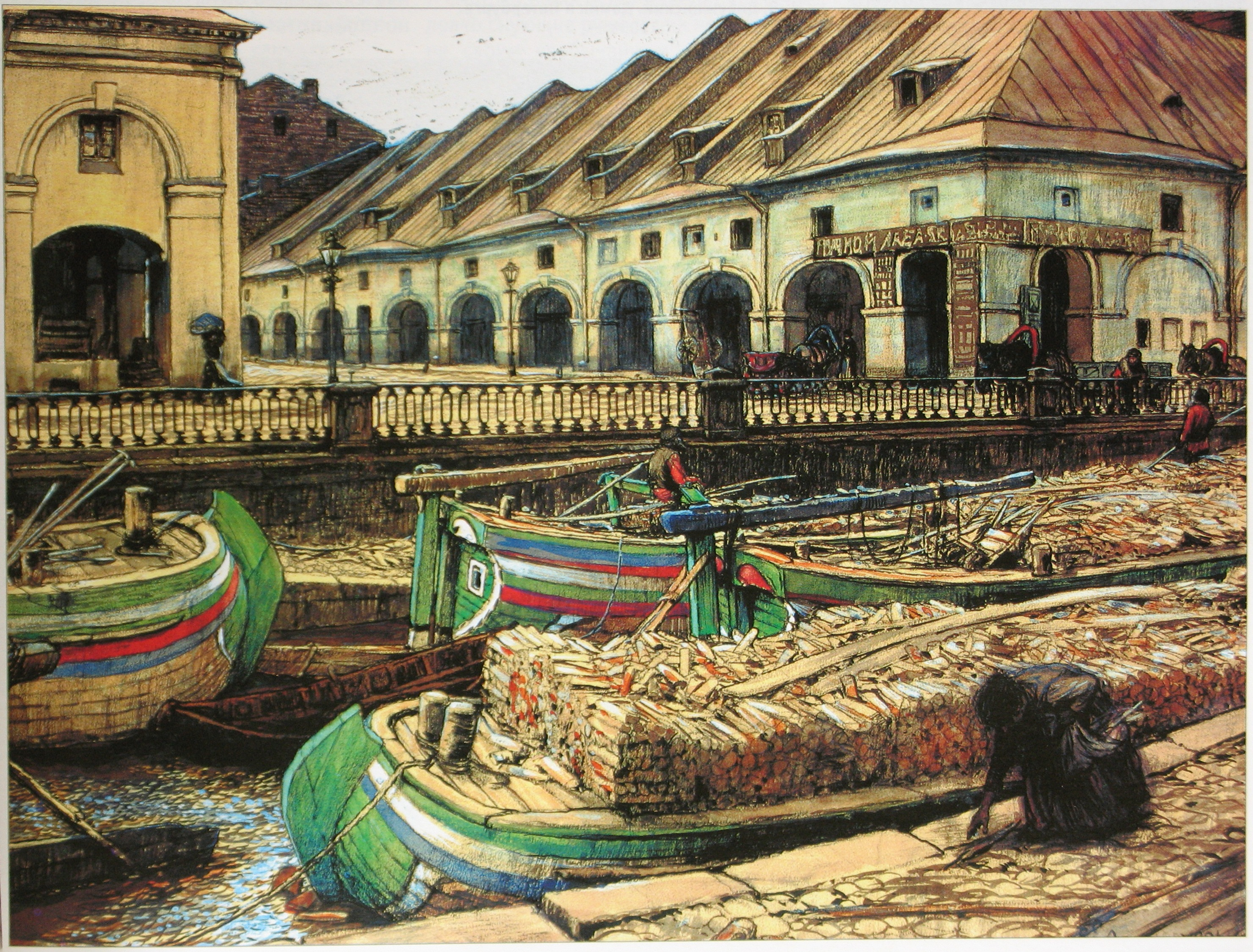
The Nikolsky Market in St. Petersburg

Lanceray was the only prominent member of Mir iskusstva to remain in Russia after the Revolution of 1917. During the Russian Civil War, he worked for the propaganda department of the Volunteer Army. Being a representative of traditional painting (not avant-garde movement) and the bourgeoisie, he was not in great demand with the new Soviet government for a long time. Even his sister found the revolutionary milieu alien to her art and, in 1924, she fled to Paris.

In February 1932, he left a note in his diaries: ‘There is incredible impoverishment. Of course, this is the government’s goal to bring everyone and everything to poverty, since it is easier to manage the poor and the hungry’.

Lanceray left Saint Petersburg in 1917, and spent three years living in Dagestan, where he became infatuated with Oriental themes. His interest increased during journeys made in the early 1920s to Japan and Ankara, Turkey. In 1920, he moved to Tiflis in Georgia. During his stay in Georgia, he lectured at the Tbilisi State Academy of Arts (1922–1934) and illustrated the Caucasian novellas of Leo Tolstoy. Amongst his students was Apollon Kutateladze.

Lanceray left Georgia in 1934, settling in Moscow, where he became engaged in the decoration of the Moscow Kazansky railway station and the Hotel Moskva. During the same period, Lanceray also worked as a theatrical designer.

Three years before his death, he was honored with the Stalin Prize, and in 1945 he was awarded the title of People's Artist of the RSFSR. He died in Moscow at the age of 71.

== Works ==
=== Moscow Kazansky railway station ===
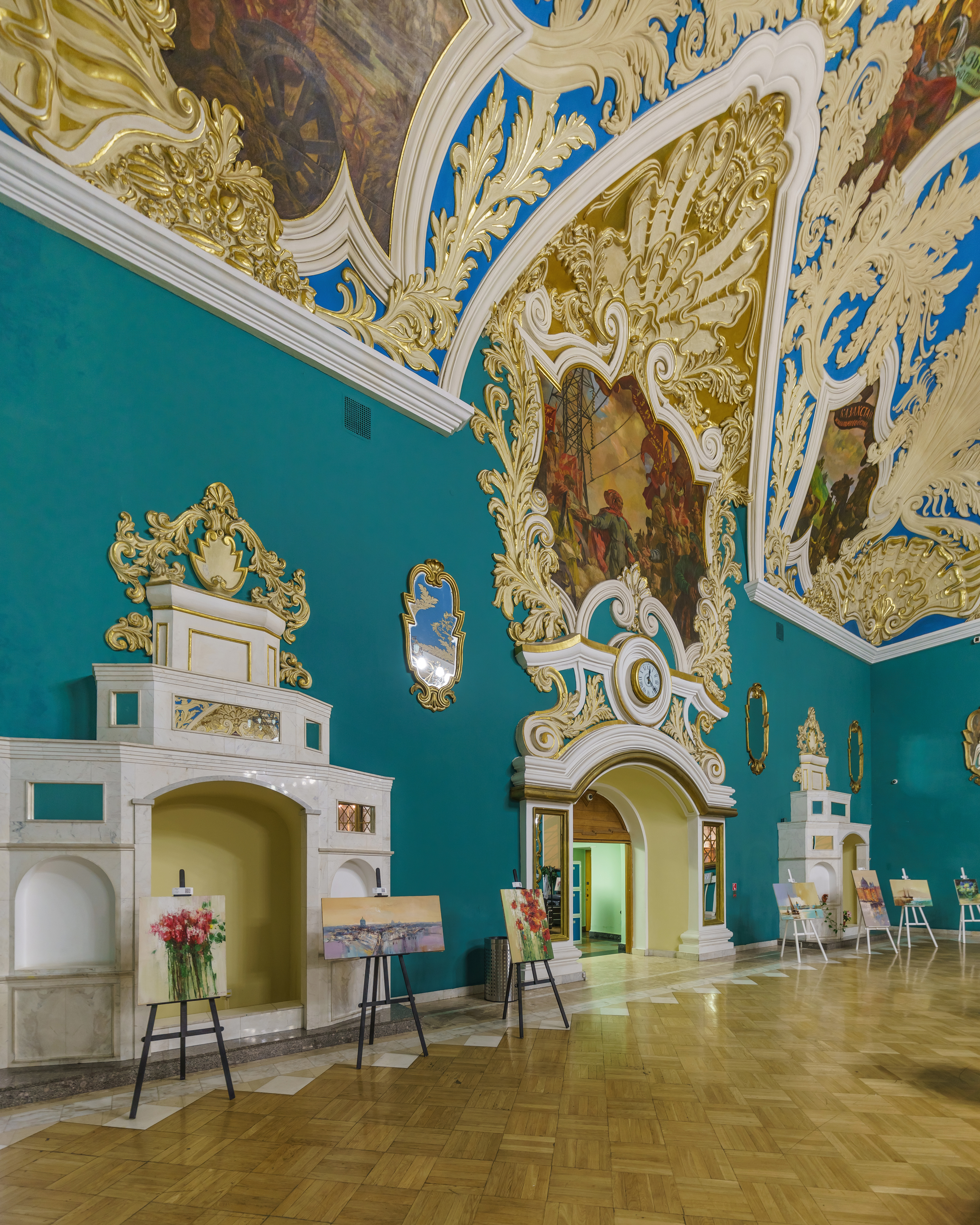
One of Lanceray's Kazansky station murals

One of the most well-known works of Lanceray is the mural of the Moscow Kazansky railway station (1932–1934 and 1944–1946).

Schusev, the famous Russian architect and a frequent character of Lanceray's diaries, was responsible for the whole process from the very beginning. In 1916, Schusev, Benois, Serebriakova, Lanceray were hired to plan the decorations and paintings for the Kazanskiy railway station, but the revolution broke off the plans.

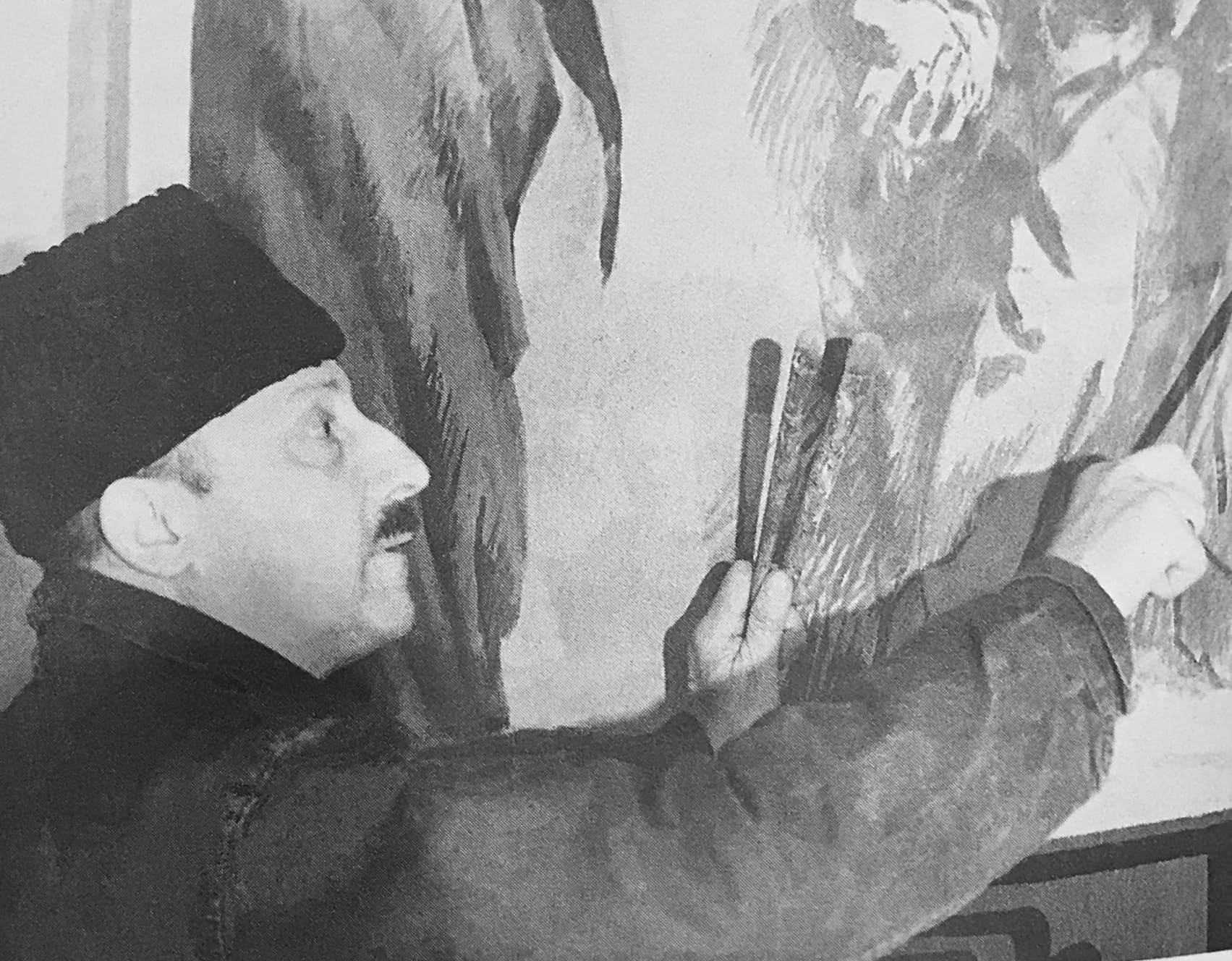
Lanceray at work on a panel for the Kazanskiy railway station.

1932 was the year when the state reform of architecture was carried out in the USSR, and ‘Stalinist’ architecture with its monumental style became canonical. Lanceray, an experienced monumental painter with conservative views, was invited from Tbilisi to Moscow to continue working at The Central Railway Station decorations. He was in charge of the restaurant located inside. In the 1932-1934 paintings, Lanceray tried to show specific features of every painted region. For instance, Murmansk displays a busy crew ship, while Crimea is depicted by a smiling Tatar woman against the background of a clear sky, exotic trees and a working carpenter.

In the thirties, he managed to complete such murals as Moscow Construction, Murmansk, Crimea, and others. In January 1934, after gluing the first canvas to the plafond Lanceray writes: "A turning, formidable day: today they glued the first picture, Crimea. Of course, I am shocked by the effect. It is small, puny, completely not picturesque, completely not monumental. <..> At this distance, there is no other volumetric effect <..> That's when you learn the experience and mastery of Byzantium!"

Because of the irregular construction of the building, high ceilings and unpredictable light, the artist faced difficulties to make the painting bright and noticeable. Besides its place and its scale, a distinctive feature of this work is that it was made using tempera paint. The artist also preferred to paint on a canvas that would then be attached to the ceiling. But, while Lanceray was disappointed with his inappropriate use of technique, the Committee members were not really satisfied with the subject of Lanceray's paintings.

Later, they would say that his projects were missing a "deep socialist" idea in his projects and would blame him for using too many abstract symbols and allegories. Lanceray kept working on these monumental paintings after the war finished. After his death, other artists had to finish the work according to the sketches he left. Nowadays, the decorated plafond of the Kazansky railway station looks very contrast. Heavy Soviet paintings of predominantly brown shades seem lost among pompous gilded stucco molding.

Today, this part of the building is used as a superior lounge, where people who buy business class tickets can wait for their departure. On every New Year's Eve, there is a constructed stage where children's performances are shown and music concerts are played.

=== Mural artworks in Kharkiv ===
In 1932, Lanceray completed two of his monumental works at the Zheleznodorozhnik Palace of Culture (now "the Central House of Culture and Technology of the South Railway") in Kharkiv. One of them is called Partisans of the Caucasus salute the Red Army and the other one Meeting of Komsomol members with the peasants of Crimea.

Over time, the paintings deteriorated and were often hidden behind a cloth. In connection with the Euro-2012, they were restored. These two murals are the only monumental works of Eugene Lanceray preserved in Ukraine and the only examples of murals of the 1930s that exist in Kharkiv. Although there were a lot of wall paintings in Kharkiv in the pre-war period, almost all of them either died during the war or disappeared during repairs, or were deliberately destroyed.

After the adoption of Ukrainian decommunization laws in 2015, these murals painted by Lanceray in Kharkiv were at risk of destruction. A public discussion was held on the conservation of them. Since the work could not be visually construed as direct communist propaganda, officials asked the state to give it the status of cultural heritage. If approved, these artworks of Lanceray would be the first examples of monumental painting, which the Ukrainian state will protect.

== See also ==
- List of Russian artists
- Kasli iron sculpture
