= Malcolm Rennie =

British actor

- Born: Malcolm Forbes Rennie; 17 February 1947 (age 78); Aberdeen, Scotland
- Occupation: Actor
- Spouse: Tamara Ustinov (m. 1989)

Malcolm Forbes Rennie (born 17 February 1947) is a British actor.

== Early life ==
Rennie was born on 17 February 1947, in Aberdeen, Scotland.

== Career ==
He has often played authority figures, including judges and police officers in Coronation Street and The Execution of Gary Glitter. He also played Snout in a production of A Midsummer Night's Dream. He appears as Fraser in Mr Selfridge.

== Personal life ==
He is married to the actress Tamara Ustinov, daughter of Peter Ustinov. The website About Aberdeen lists him as a famous Aberdonian.

== Filmography ==
=== Film ===
Year	Title	Role	Notes
1974	Ransom	Terry	
2011	Hysteria	Lord St. John-Smythe	

=== Television ===
Year	Title	Role	Notes
1970–2011	Coronation Street	Judge / Eddie Pritchard	7 episodes
1973	Scotch on the Rocks	S.L.A. Sergeant	Episode: "Phase 4"
1975	Churchill's People	MacDonnell	Episode: "O Canada"
1975	Softly, Softly: Task Force	PC Perry	12 episodes
1976	When Santa Rode the Prairie	Beastly Bill Bracken	Television film
1976	Crown Court	Hamish Stewart-MacKenzie	Episode: "Auld Lang Syne: Part 1"
1977	Rentaghost	Police Constable	Episode #3.3
1977	1990	Emigration Officer	Episode: "Creed of Slaves"
1980	Pride and Prejudice	Mr Collins	2 episodes
1982	Cloud Howe	Hairy Hogg	4 episodes
1982–1983	King's Royal	Peter Ross	13 episodes
1983	The Consultant	Tuckman	Episode: "Extension of Credit"
1987–1988	The Lenny Henry Show	Sgt. Lillie	12 episodes
1989	Screen One	Forsyth	Episode: "The Accountant"
1991	Devices and Desires	Mr. Mair	Episode #1.2
1991, 2009	The Bill	Thomas Lovell / Griffiths	2 episodes
1992	Bookmark	Hugh Pollock	Episode: "Sunny Stories"
1993	Taggart	Willie Fraser	3 episodes
1997	Highlander: The Series	Drimble / Smythe	2 episodes
1999	Lucy Sullivan Is Getting Married	Karen's Dad	Episode: "To Scotland and Back"
2000	Midsomer Murders	Alderman	Episode: "Judgement Day"
2002	Monarch of the Glen	McGregor	2 episodes
2005	Pride and Prejudice Revisited	Mr Collins	Television film
2006	Losing It	Mr. Pringle	Television film
2006–2008	Doctors	Various roles	6 episodes
2008	Never Better	Peter	Episode: "Good Samaritan"
2009	Monday Monday	Bryan	Episode #1.4
2009	The Execution of Gary Glitter	Judge	Television film
2009	Doctor Who: Mission to Magnus	Anzor	Television film
2012	Sherlock	Judge	Episode: "The Reichenbach Fall"
2013–2016	Mr Selfridge	Fraser	32 episodes
2021	Ted Lasso	Renee	Episode: "Beard After Hours"
2024	Heartstopper	Grandad Roger	Episode: "Winter"
