= Tamara Ustinov =

British actress (born 1945)

- Born: 1945 (age 80–81)
- Other name: Tammy Ustinov
- Occupation: Actress
- Spouse: Malcolm Rennie (m. 1989)
- Father: Peter Ustinov
- Relatives: Angela Lansbury (aunt); Bruce Lansbury (uncle); Edgar Lansbury (uncle); Moyna Macgill (grandmother); Reginald Denham (grandfather); Nadia Benois (grandmother); Jona von Ustinov (grandfather)

Tamara Ustinov (/ˈuːstɪnɒv/ OO-stin-ov; born 1945) is a British actress known for the films The Blood on Satan's Claw (1970), Blood from the Mummy's Tomb (1971), and The Last Horror Movie (2003).

== Career ==
Ustinov appeared in the films The Blood on Satan's Claw (1970), Blood from the Mummy's Tomb (1971), and The Last Horror Movie (2003). In 2003, she appeared as the "Bride's mother" in The Last Horror Movie.

== Personal life ==
Ustinov is the only child of Peter Ustinov and Isolde Denham (1920–1987), daughter of Reginald Denham and Moyna Macgill. Her parents' marriage lasted from 1940 to their divorce in 1950. She is the half-niece of Dame Angela Lansbury (Tamara's mother, Isolde, was the half-sister of Angela Lansbury, who appeared with Peter Ustinov in Death on the Nile, 1978). Her father's estate has been in a protracted dispute between her half-brother, the sculptor Igor Ustinov, and her father's third wife.

Tamara Ustinov has been married to Malcolm Rennie since 1989.

== Filmography ==
=== Film ===
Year	Title	Role	Notes
1971	The Blood on Satan's Claw	Rosalind Barton	
1971	Blood from the Mummy's Tomb	Veronica	
2003	The Last Horror Movie	Bride's mother	
2004	Feedback	Mrs. Montague	

=== Television ===
Year	Title	Role	Notes
1970	Comedy Playhouse	Josie Oakley	Episode: "The Old Contemptible"
1970	The Doctors	Di Pitt	4 episodes
1971	Long Voyage Out of War	Agnes	Episode: "The Last Enemy"
1971	Paul Temple	Natalya	Episode: "Paper Chase"
1972	Playhouse	Marion	Episode: "The Long Lease of Summer"
1973	The Pathfinders	Liz Foster	Episode: "Sweets from a Stranger"
1975	In This House of Brede	Constance	Television film
1975	Z-Cars	Hotel Receptionist	Episode: "Legacy"
1978	The Prime of Miss Jean Brodie	Miss Finch	Episode: "Newcastle"
1978	The Standard	Jean	Episode: "New Standards"
1980	Airport Chaplain	Girl	Episode: "Arrivals and Departures"
1983	Bergerac	Libby	Episode: "Prime Target"
1983	Skorpion	WPC Baker	6 episodes
1984	Tales of the Unexpected	Beryl	Episode: "Accidental Death"
1985	Grange Hill	Mrs. Joseph	Episode #8.7
1985	Drummonds	Mark's mother	Episode: "A Woman Lost and Found"
1995	The Ruth Rendell Mysteries	District Nurse	Episode: "The Strawberry Tree: Part 1"
1996	Kavanagh QC	Sarah Lee Gordon	Episode: "Men of Substance"
2001	Doctors	Catherine Francis	Episode: "Truth and Consequences"
2001	Casualty	Dr. Andrea Cliffe	Episode: "Bringing Up Baby"
2005	Hex	Tour Guide	Episode: "Ella Burns"
2024	Heartstopper	Grandma Nancy	Episode: "Winter"
