= Nadia Benois =

Russian-born British painter (1896–1975)

- Надежда Бенуа
- Self-portrait
- Born: Nadezhda Leontievna Benois; 17 May 1896; Saint Petersburg, Russia
- Died: 8 December 1975 (aged 79); Gloucestershire, England
- Occupations: Artist; painter
- Spouse: Jona von Ustinov
- Children: Peter Ustinov
- Relatives: Tamara Ustinov (granddaughter)

Nadezhda Leontievna Ustinova (Russian: Надежда Леонтьевна Устинова; née Benois [Бенуа]; 17 May 1896 – 8 December 1975), better known as Nadia Benois, was a Russian-born British painter of still lifes and landscapes, and stage designer. Her father Leon Benois belonged to the Benois family. She was the mother of British actor, writer, and filmmaker Sir Peter Ustinov.

== Personal life ==
Nadia Benois, born Nadezhda Leontievna Benois in Saint Petersburg, was the youngest daughter of Leon Benois, a Russian architect. Nadezhda studied to be an artist at St. Petersburg Academy of Fine Arts. On 1 June 1920, Benois met Jona Ustinov, a journalist and diplomat; on 17 July 1920, Benois married Ustinov, and the two settled in London on 22 December 1920. On April 16, 1921, Peter, their only child was born. In 1935, Jona became a British subject.

She died on 8 December 1975 in Gloucestershire.

== Artistic career ==
=== Painting work ===
In the course of her travels, Benois painted the impressionist landscapes of London, Wales, Ireland, and Scotland. She exhibited her works in the Goupil, Redfern, Beaux-Arts, and other galleries, and is mentioned in multiple journals from the Royal Arts Society. Some of her still lifes were acquired by the Tate Gallery in 1936.

=== Design work ===
Benois was regarded as a figure of leadership in her design career. She was the scenery and costume designer for The Descent of Hebe. Antony Tudor has stated that Benois' work was the inspiration for the choreography of this work. She also designed the stage for the ballet Cap over Mill, which was part of the Dark Elegies. Benois' work in Cap over Mill has been positively regarded as "striking décor". Her contributions to Dark Elegies have been credited as a key addition to the timelessness of the work. Benois was also credited for her work adding to the qualities which made Dark Elegies stand as a unique experience. In 1938, Benois designed the set and the costumes for La Péri. Despite the praise that was given to Benois' contributions, the performance was withdrawn due to criticism towards the choreographer. Her work on The Sleeping Princess has been criticized, with this criticism stimming from the low budget she was given. In 1948, Benois commented about her work on Lady into Fox, claiming it to be her "gem above all gems". A performer for Lady into Fox has also praised Benois' design, claiming that the costume which she had designed for her to use was "perfect".

Later, Benois created costumes and sets for the films Vice Versa (1948) and Private Angelo (1949), both written and directed by her son, Peter.

== Notable works ==
Paintings

- "Kensington Gardens" (Manchester City Art Gallery, 1937)

Group Exhibitions

"Three Women Painters" by Nadia Benois, Clare Crossley, Nancy Tennant (Michael Parkin Gallery, 1975)

Design Productions

- "The Descent of Hebe" (1935)
- "Dark Elegies"(1937)
- "La Péri" (1938)
- "The Sleeping Princess" (1939)
- "Lady into Fox" (1939)
- "Cap Over Mill" (1940)
