= Albert Nikolayevitch Benois =

Russian painter (1852–1936)

- Альберт Николаевич Бенуа
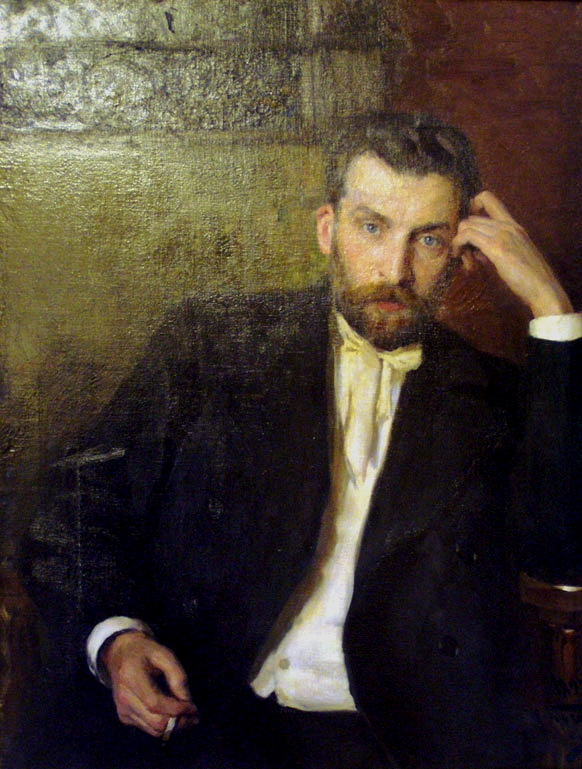
- Portrait by Nikolai D. Kuznetsov (1897)
- Born: 14 March 1852; Saint Petersburg, Russia
- Died: 16 May 1936 (aged 84); Fontenay-aux-Roses, France
- Resting place: Sainte-Geneviève-des-Bois Russian Cemetery, Paris
- Education: Imperial Academy of Arts (1877)
- Known for: Watercolor painting
- Spouses: Maria Kind (m. 1876; div. 1886) Mariya Shpak (m. 1891; died 1891)

Albert Nikolayevitch Benois (Russian: Альбе́рт Никола́евич Бенуа́, romanized: Albert Nikolayevich Benua; 26 March [O.S. 14 March] 1852 – 16 May 1936) was a Russian painter and art teacher who specialized in watercolor landscapes.

== Biography ==
His father was the architect, Nicholas Benois. He graduated from secondary school in 1871, then attended the Imperial Academy of Arts and took private watercolor lessons from Luigi Premazzi. In 1877, he graduated with the title of "Artist-Architect", first-degree, and took up watercolor painting. In 1880, he was one of the founding members of the "Circle of Russian Watercolorists". From 1883 to 1885, he travelled through Italy, France and Spain. He earned the title of "Academician" in 1884, for two of his works from Italy.

From 1876 to 1886, he was married to a Swiss pianist named Maria Kind (1855-1909), but divorced her after she had an affair with the composer, Sergei Taneyev.

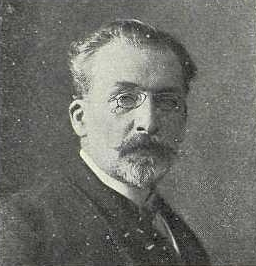
Benois in 1911

He became a member of the Imperial Academy in 1890 and was appointed a professor of watercolors in 1894; a position he held until 1905. He also served on the academy's governing board. In 1895, he was appointed a curator at the Russian Museum. In 1903, he began working as co-editor at the art journal, Mir Iskusstva. During times off from teaching, he continued to travel; visiting North Africa and taking a trip through Siberia, Manchuria, Korea and Japan, among other places. He became Director of the Museum of Applied Arts (operated by the People's Commissariat of Trade and Industry) in 1918. Two years later, he accompanied an expedition by the Petrograd Institute of Geology to the northern coast where he produced a series of paintings.

In 1924, he went to Paris to visit his daughter, the opera singer Maria Tcherepnin (wife of the composer, Nikolai Tcherepnin) and decided to remain there. Two years later, he was elected a member of the Paris Académie des Beaux-Arts. He donated many of his works to charities that assisted Russian artists living abroad.

In his later years, he suffered from a disease of the feet (possibly gout) and was cared for by his daughter. He died at a nursing home in a suburb of Paris in 1936.

== Family ==
His family included many notable figures in the arts. In addition to those mentioned above, the architect Alberto Cavos was his grandfather. The artist and theatrical designer Alexandre Benois and the architect Leon Benois were his brothers. He was also the uncle of painter Zinaida Serebriakova, and great-uncle of Sir Peter Ustinov. His grandson, Alexander Tcherepnin, was a composer and pianist of note. His son Nikolai was married to the opera singer Maria Nikolaevna Kuznetsova.

== Gallery ==
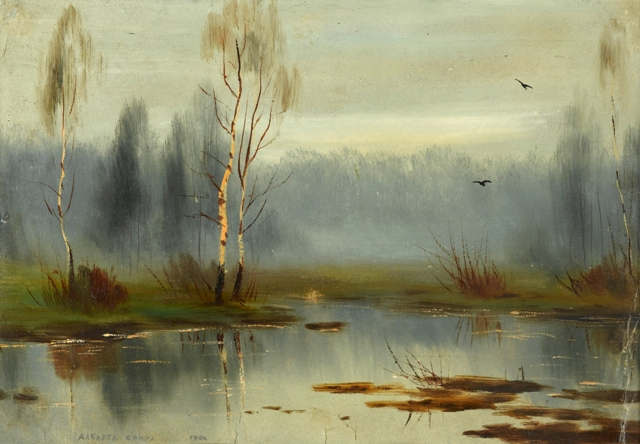
Silver Birches, 1904

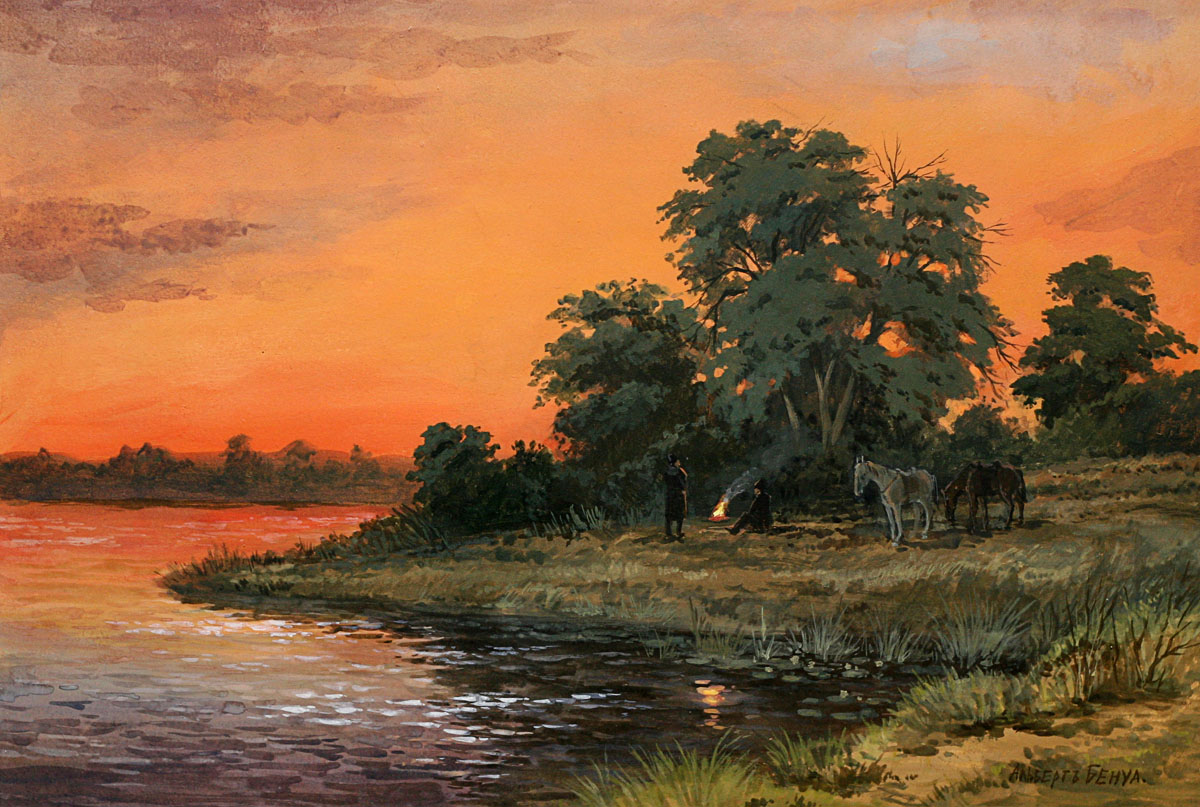
Travellers at a Campfire

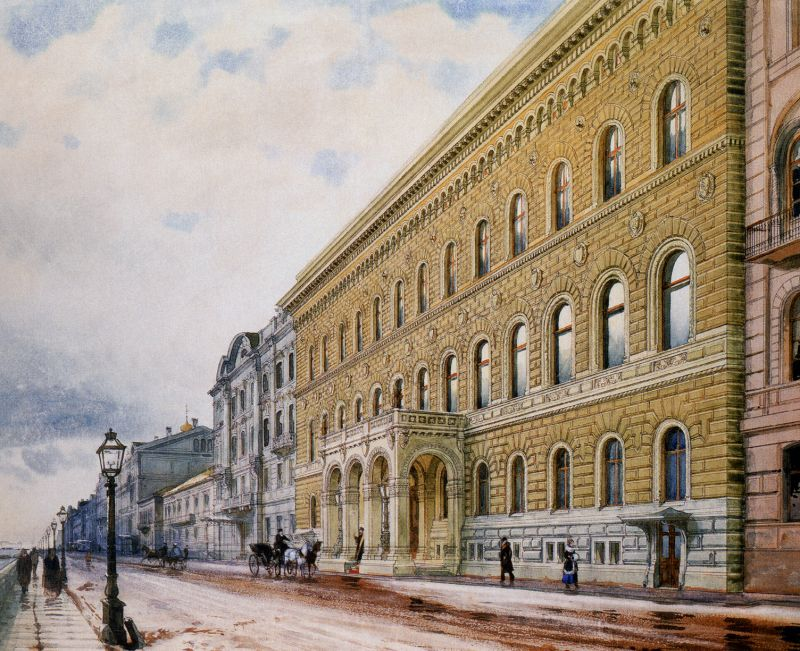
Vladimir Palace in Saint Petersburg, c1870s

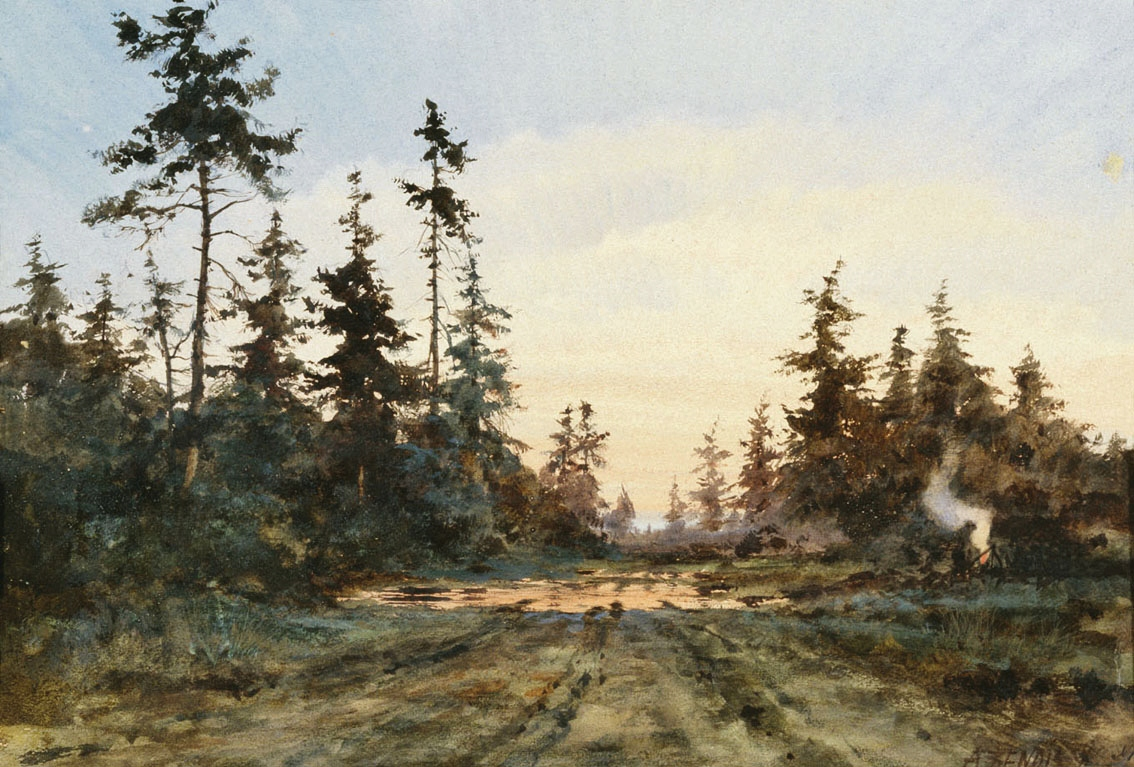
The Grove

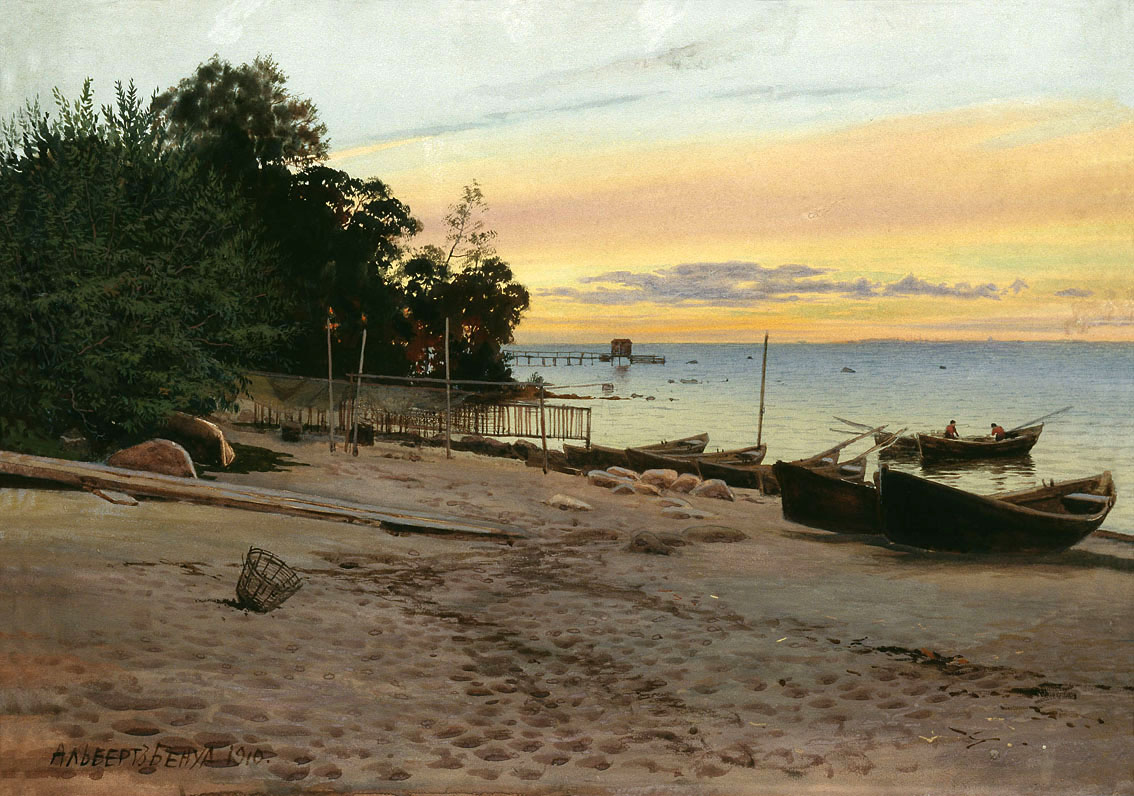
Evening at the Seashore, 1910
