= Nicola Alexandrovich Benois =

Russian stage designer active mainly in Italy (1901–1988)

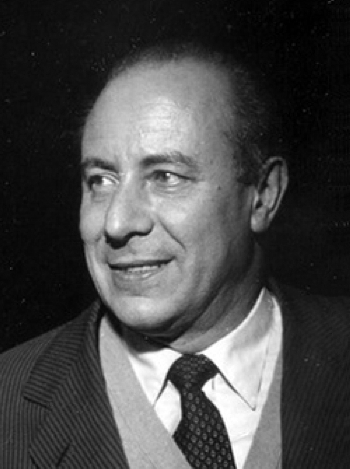
- Benois c. 1954
- Born: 2 May 1901; Saint Petersburg, Russian Empire
- Died: 31 March 1988 (aged 86); Codroipo, Italy

Nicola Alexandrovich Benois (Russian: Николай Александрович Бенуа, romanized: Nikolay Aleksandrovich Benua, 2 May 1901 – 31 March 1988) was a stage designer, known for his work as principal scenographer and costume designer at La Scala in Milan.

== Education and early career ==
Nicola was the son of Alexandre Benois, an influential artist, critic, historian and stage designer. He was born in Saint Petersburg, Russia, where his father was the costume designer of the Mariinsky Theatre, the imperial opera house. The family lived in their grand mansion near the opera house, which was built by his grandfather Nikolai Benois. Nicola studied art and design under his father before attending the Academy of Fine Arts in Saint Petersburg.

After working as scenographer and set designer for several of the Mariinsky opera and ballet productions, he emigrated from Russia to Paris, France in 1923. There he worked for Sergei Diaghilev as a set designer for several of the Ballets Russes productions.

== Work at La Scala ==
Nicola later moved to Italy, following his father Alexandre Benois, and was invited by Alexander Sanin to design Khovanshchina at La Scala. His designs were well received and he was offered a position as a designer at Teatro dell'Opera di Roma.

In 1935, Nicola accepted the post of principal scenographer at La Scala. There he collaborated with Luchino Visconti, the powerful producer of La Scala, who insisted on genuine period jewelry and costumes for the performing stars. Benois was a master of period design. His stage works are remarkable for their mastery of line, form and color scheme. Many are now exhibited as museum pieces and studied by designers worldwide. In all, he designed about 300 ballet and opera productions for theaters of Turin, Milan, Rome, and other cities worldwide. He died in 1988, in Codroipo, Italy.
