= Mir iskusstva =

Early 20th-century Russian art movement with magazine of the same name

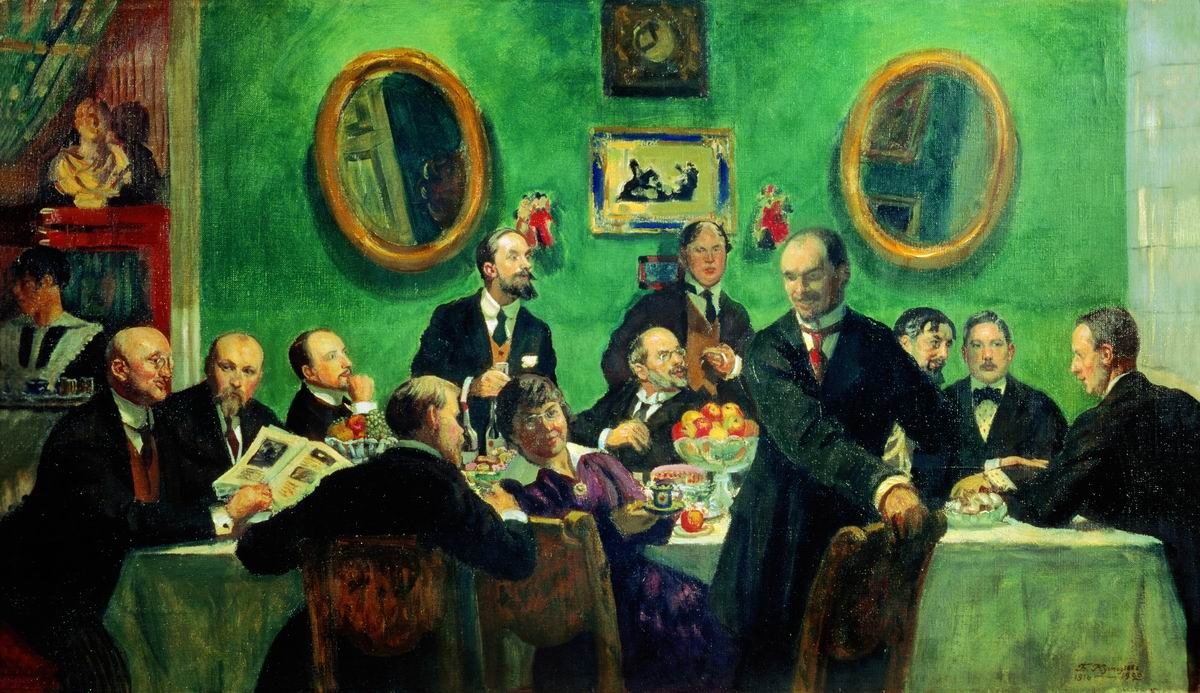
"Members of the Mir Iskusstva Movement", by Boris Kustodiev (1916–1920). From left to right: Igor Grabar, Nicholas Roerich, Eugene Lanceray, Kustodiev, Ivan Bilibin, Anna Ostroumova-Lebedeva, Alexandre Benois, Heorhiy Narbut, Kuzma Petrov-Vodkin, Nikolay Milioti, Konstantin Somov and Mstislav Dobuzhinsky

Mir iskusstva (Russian: «Мир искусства», IPA: [ˈmʲir ɪˈskustvə], World of Art) was both a Russian magazine and the artistic movement it fostered, playing a significant role in shaping the Russian avant-garde. The movement was deeply influential to Russian artists who contributed to the 20th century revolution in European art. The magazine itself had limited circulation outside of Russia, as it remained a central part of the development of the Russian modernism movement.

== Foundation of Mir Iskusstva ==
The artistic group known as the Miriskussniki was founded in November 1898 by a collective of students that included Alexandre Benois, Konstantin Somov, Dmitry Filosofov, Léon Bakst, and Eugene Lansere. the group emerged from a shared vision to challenge the conventional artistic norms of the time and introduce a fresh, individualistic approach to Russian art. The beginnings of Mir Iskusstva can be traced back to organization of the Exhibition of Russian and Finnish Artists in the Stieglitz Museum of Applied Arts in Saint Petersburg.

In 1899, the group launched the magazine Mir Iskusstva, which played a pivotal role in their mission to reshape the Russian artistic landscape. The journal was cofounded in Saint Petersburg by Benois, Bakst, and Diaghilev (the Chief Editor). the group sought to break away from the rigid, academic traditions upheld by the Peredvizhniki (wanderers). They advocated for artistic freedom, individual expression, and celebrated Art Nouveau aesthetic and other principles of Art Nouveau. The theoretical foundation of the group’s artistic ideology was articulated through a series of seminal articles by Diaghilev, which were published in the journal's early issues (Nos. 1/2 and 3/4). These writings included titles such as "Difficult Questions," "Our Imaginary Degradation," "Permanent Struggle," "In Search of Beauty," and "The Fundamentals of Artistic Appreciation." Through these pieces, Diaghilev outlined the group’s critical stance on contemporary art and their vision for the future of Russian culture, which was centered on a commitment to beauty, individualism, and innovation.

== Classical period ==
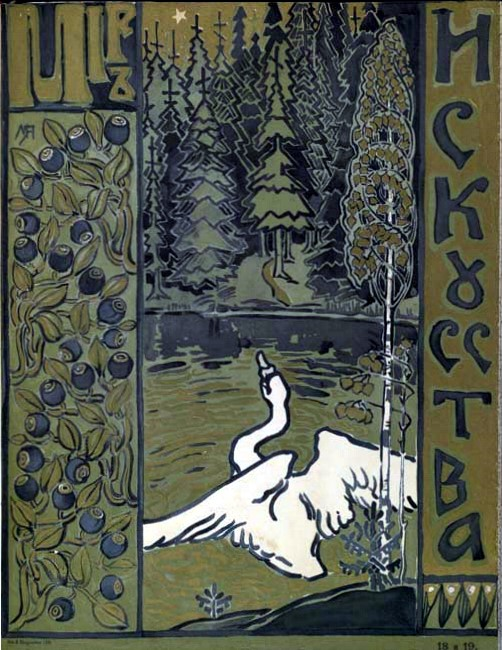
Mir iskusstva cover 1899 by Maria Yakunchikova

The Mir Iskusstva group entered its "classical period" from 1898 to 1904, during which it organized a series of six significant exhibitions that showcased its avant-garde ideas and artistic endeavors. These exhibitions played a key role in challenging the status quo of Russian art at the time, establishing the group as a force of innovation and cultural change. The exhibitions were as follows:

(1898–1904) the art group organized six exhibitions: 1899 (International), 1900, 1901 (At the Imperial Academy of Arts, Saint Petersburg), 1902 (Moscow and Saint Petersburg), 1903, 1906 (Saint Petersburg). The sixth exhibition was seen as a Diaghilev's attempt to prevent the separation from the Moscow members of the group who organized a separate "Exhibition of 36 artists" (1901) and later "The Union of Russian Artists" group (from 1903). The magazine ended in 1904. – The first exhibition was international in scope, featuring works from both Russian and foreign artists.

- 1899 – The first exhibition was international in scope, featuring works from both Russian and foreign artists.
- 1900– This exhibition continued the group's commitment to expanding the reach of their artistic ideals.
- 1901– Held at the prestigious Imperial Academy of Arts in Saint Petersburg, this exhibition marked a high point for the group, drawing attention from the artistic and intellectual elite.
- 1902 – The group presented exhibitions in both Moscow and Saint Petersburg, further cementing its influence on Russian art.
- 1903 – This year’s exhibition was another important showcase of the group’s creative output.
- 1906 – The final Mir Iskusstva exhibition in Saint Petersburg was seen as an effort by Sergei Diaghilev to preserve unity within the group. At this time, there was growing tension between the Saint Petersburg and Moscow factions of the movement. The Moscow-based artists, frustrated with the group’s direction, had already organized the "Exhibition of 36 Artists" in 1901 and subsequently formed the "Union of Russian Artists" in 1903, a more conservative and traditionalist group. Diaghilev’s 1906 exhibition was an attempt to maintain cohesion, but it ultimately marked the group’s dissolution.

In 1910, Mir iskusstva was revived after Alexandre Benois published a critical article "Rech" about the Union of Russian Artists. Nicholas Roerich became the new chairman, and the group expanded to include the avant-garde artists such as Nathan Altman, Vladimir Tatlin, and Martiros Saryan. Some said that the inclusion of Russian avant-garde painters demonstrated that the group had become an exhibition organization rather than an art movement. In 1917 the chairman of the group became Ivan Bilibin. The same year most members of the Jack of Diamonds entered the group.

1922 Saint-Petersburg, Moscow). The last exhibition of Mir iskusstva was organized in Paris in 1927. Some members of the group entered the Zhar-Tsvet (Moscow, organized in 1924) and Four Arts (Moscow-Leningrad, organized in 1925) artistic movements.

== Art ==
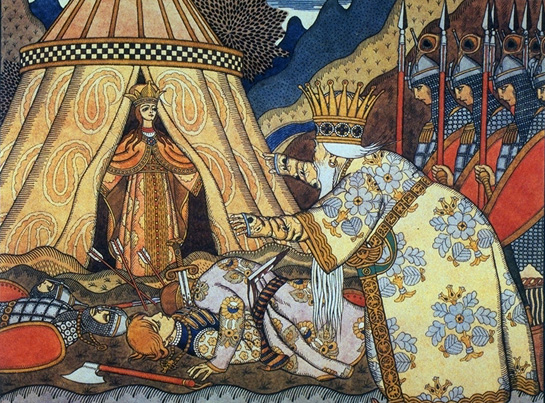
Ivan Bilibin's illustration to The Tale of the Golden Cockerel.

Like the English Pre-Raphaelites before them, Benois and his colleagues were disgusted with anti-aesthetic nature of modern industrial society and modernity in general, and sought to consolidate all Neo-Romantic Russian artists under the banner of fighting Positivism in art. Their mission was to return to art's more expressive and idealizes roots, rejecting the rational and the mechanical.

Like the Romantics before them, the miriskussniki promoted understanding and conservation of the art of previous epochs, particularly traditional folk art and the 18th-century rococo. Antoine Watteau was probably the single artist whom they admired the most.

Members of the Mir iskusstva (World of Art) movement frequently approached revivalist projects with self-parody and humor, showing a strong aesthetic preference for masks, marionettes, carnival themes, puppet theatre, dreams, and fairy tales over serious or emotional subjects. Their artistic output favored the grotesque and playful, and their affinity for Venice was such that both Sergei Diaghilev and Igor Stravinsky chose to be buried there.

=== Preferred Media ===
The Mir Iskusstva group favored light, airy media such as watercolor and gouache over traditional, heavy oil paintings. They aimed to bring art into everyday life, designing interiors and books.

=== Revolutionary theatrical Design ===
Bakst and Benois transformed theatrical design with their groundbreaking work for productions like:

- Cléopâtre (1909)
- Carnaval (1910)
- Petrushka (1911)
- L'après-midi d'un faune (1912)

=== Active members ===
In addition to the three founding members, prominent figures in Mir Iskustva included:

- Mstislav Dobuzhinsky
- Eugene Lansere
- Konstantin Somov

=== Exhibitions and Influence ===
Mir Iskusstva exhibitions attracted renowned painters from Russia and abroad, such as:

- Mikhail Vrubel
- Mikhail Nesterov
- Isaac Levitan

In 1902, Benois and Mir Iskusstva established a publishing house, producing a variety of materials aimed at bringing art and knowledge to a wider audience. They created postcards featuring reproductions of art masterpieces, as well as 'educational' postcards with short commentaries and images from various scientific fields, such as geography and zoology. However, these items saw limited demand, with only scenic and landscape postcards selling in large numbers.

By 1909, the publishing house shifted its focus to books. This marked a significant step in their goal of making art more accessible to the public. They published guide-books on Pavlovsk, St. Petersburg, and the Hermitage Museum; an exquisite edition of The Bronze Horseman with illustrations by Benois and many more.

== Gallery ==
Representative works

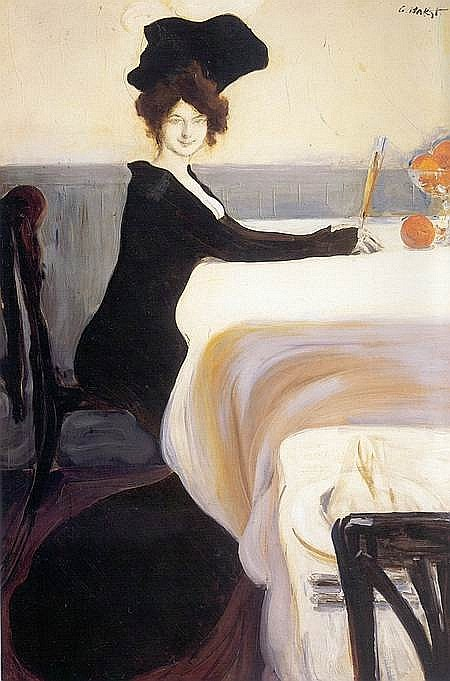
Léon Bakst

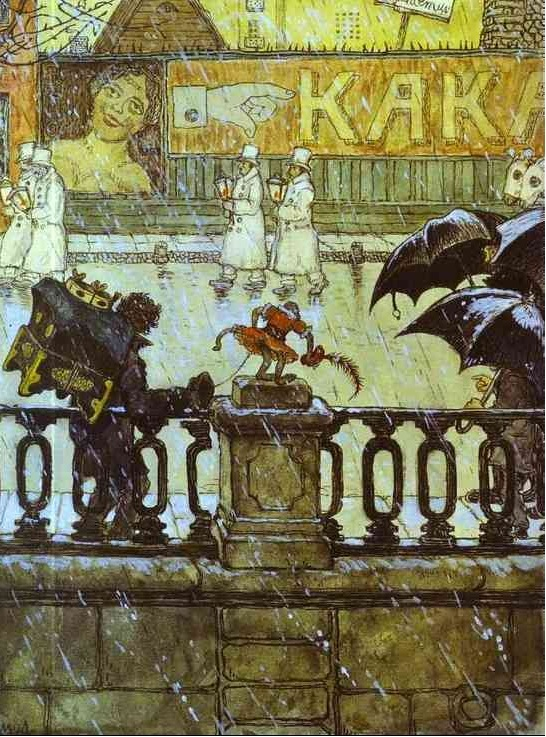
Mstislav Dobuzhinsky

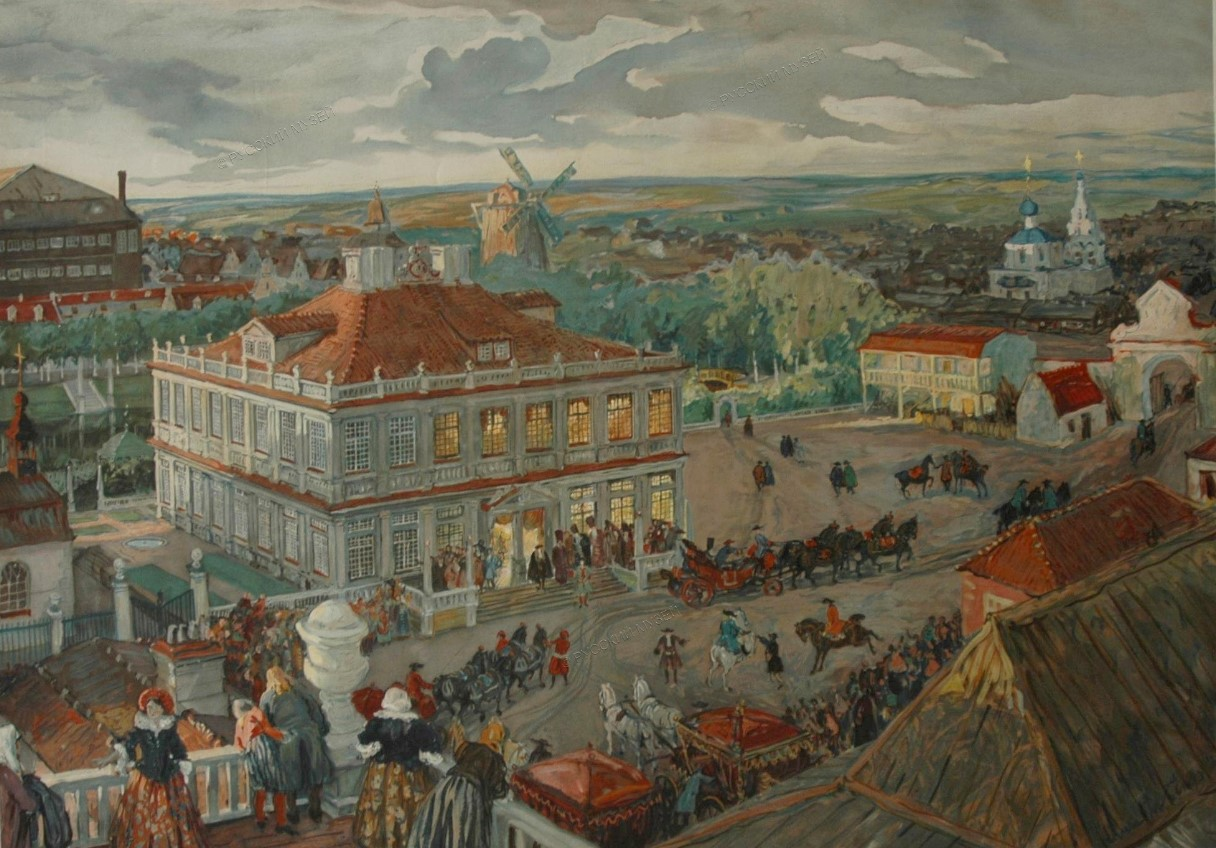
Alexandre Benois

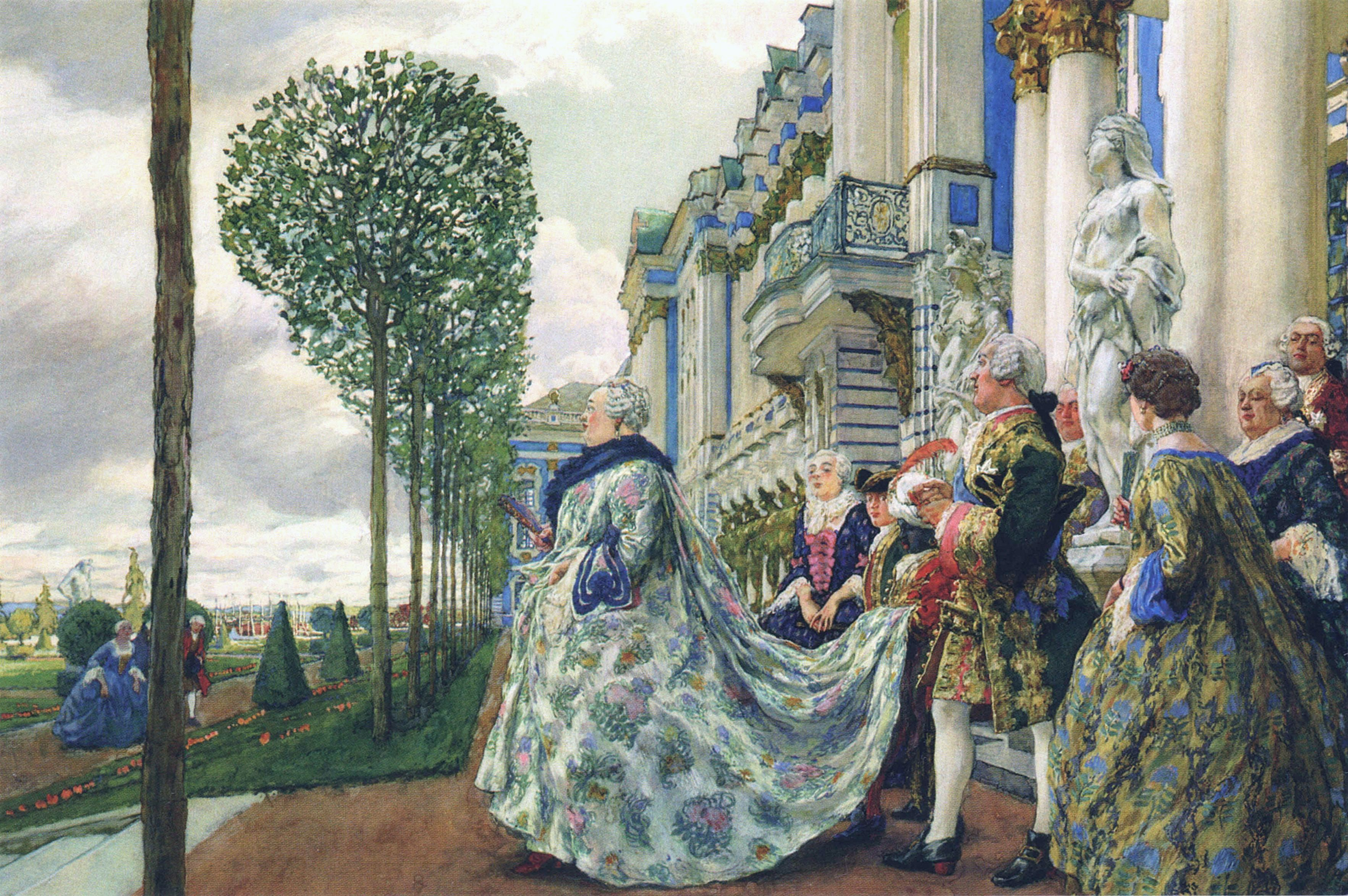
Eugene Lanceray

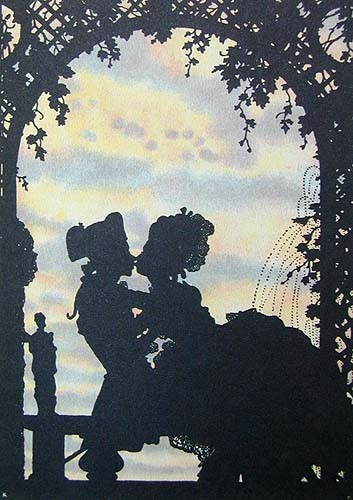
Konstantin Somov

== Literature ==
- Hanna Chuchvaha, Art Periodical Culture in Late Imperial Russia (1898–1917). Print Modernism in Transition (Boston & Leiden: Brill, 2016)
- Melnik, Natalya (2015). "On the History of the Establishing of 'Mir Iskusstva' in St Petersburg". SPSU Journal (in Russian). 3. Saint Petersburg State University: 203–215.
- Yakovleva, A. S. (2017). "Aestheticism and decadence in articles of journal "World of art"". Journal of Saint-Petersburg State University of Culture and Arts (in Russian). 3 (32): 150–152.
- Ilyina, T. V.; Fomina, M. S. (2018). История отечественного искусства [National Arts History] (in Russian). Moscow. p. 238. ISBN 978-5-534-07319-5.
- Mazokhina, N. A. (2009). Издательский проект художников объединения "Мир искусства" [The Publishing project of the artists of the "World of Art" association]. Chelyabinsk State University Journal (in Russian). 34 (172): 163–167.
- Janet Kennedy, The Mir Iskusstva Group and Russian Art 1898–1912 (New York: Garland, 1977)
