= Alexandre Benois =

Russian painter (1870–1960)

- Александр Бенуа
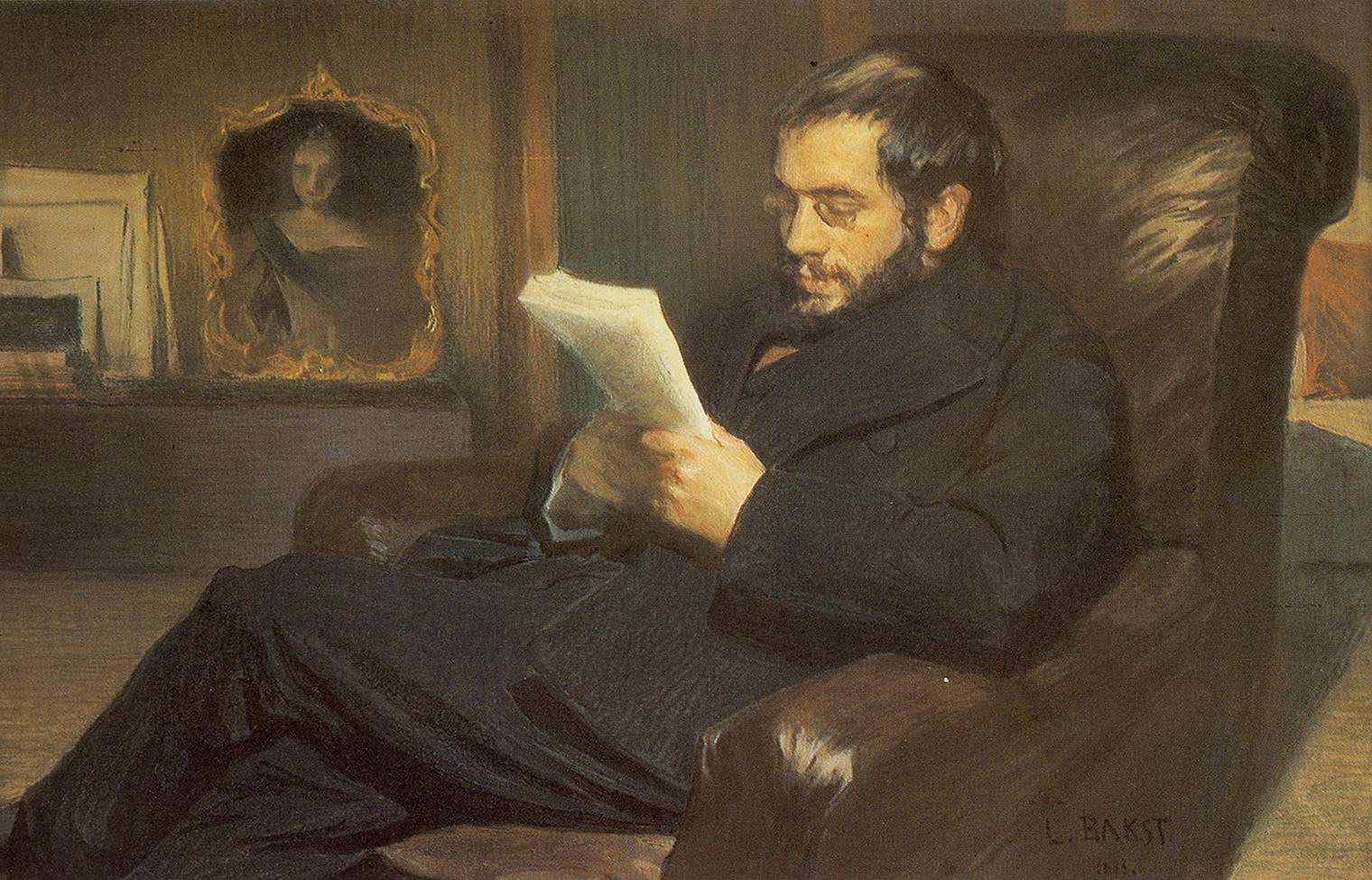
- Portrait by Léon Bakst, 1898, watercolor and pastel; Russian Museum
- Born: 3 May 1870; Saint Petersburg, Russia
- Died: 9 February 1960 (aged 89); Paris, France
- Resting place: Batignolles Cemetery, Paris
- Citizenship: Russian, later French
- Education: Saint Petersburg Imperial University
- Occupations: Artist; historian
- Movement: Mir Iskusstva, Art Nouveau, Aesthetic
- Spouse: Anna Kind (m. 1894; died 1952)
- Parents: Nicholas Benois (father); Camille Cavos (mother)
- Family: Benois

Alexandre (Alexander) Nikolayevich Benois (Russian: Алекса́ндр Никола́евич Бенуа́, romanized: Aleksandr Nikolayevich Benua; 3 May [O.S. 21 April] 1870 – 9 February 1960) was a Russian artist, art critic, historian, preservationist and founding member of Mir iskusstva ("World of Art"), an art movement and magazine. As a designer for the Ballets Russes under Sergei Diaghilev, Benois exerted what is considered a seminal influence on the modern ballet and stage design.

== Early life and education ==
Alexandre was born into the artistic and intellectual Benois family, prominent members of the 19th- and early 20th-century Russian intelligentsia. His mother Camilla (Russian: Камилла Альбертовна Кавос, and then Бенуа) was the granddaughter of Catterino Cavos. His father was Nicholas Benois, a Russian architect. His brothers included Albert, a painter, and Leon, also a notable architect. His sister, Maria, married the composer and conductor Nikolai Tcherepnin (with whom Alexandre would work). Not planning a career in the arts, Alexandre graduated from the Faculty of Law, Saint Petersburg Imperial University, in 1894.

== Entry into art career ==
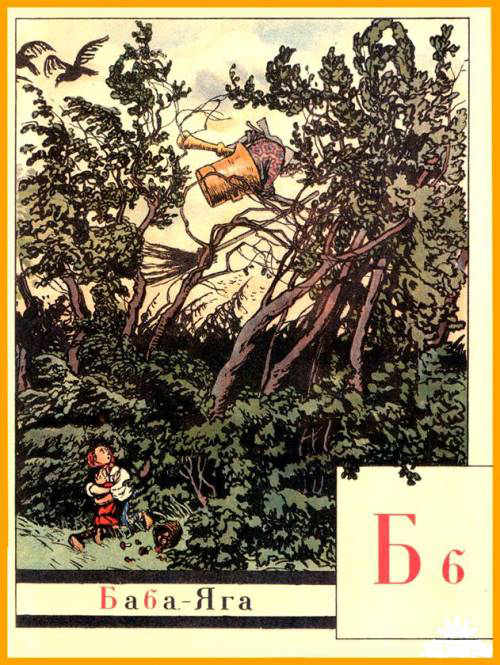
Baba Yaga, from the "Alphabet in Pictures", 1904

Three years later while in Versailles, Benois painted a series of watercolors depicting Last Promenades of Louis XIV. When exhibited by Pavel Tretyakov in 1897, they brought him to attention of Sergei Diaghilev and the artist Léon Bakst. Together the three men founded the art magazine and movement Mir iskusstva (World of Art), which promoted the Aesthetic Movement and Art Nouveau in Russia.

During the first decade of the new century, Benois continued to edit Mir iskusstva, but also pursued his scholarly and artistic interests. He wrote and published several monographs on 19th-century Russian art and Tsarskoye Selo. In 1903, Benois printed his illustrations to Pushkin's poem The Bronze Horseman, a work since recognized as one of the landmarks in the genre. In 1904, he published his "Alphabet in Pictures", at once a children's primer and elaborate art book, copies of which fetch as much as $10,000US at auction. Illustrations from this volume were featured at a video presentation during the opening ceremony of the Winter Olympics in Sochi in 2014.

In 1901, Benois was appointed scenic director of the Mariinsky Theatre in Saint Petersburg, the performance space for the Imperial Russian Ballet. He moved to Paris in 1905 and thereafter devoted most of his time to stage design and decor.

During these years, his work with Diaghilev's Ballets Russes was groundbreaking. His sets and costumes for the productions of Les Sylphides (1909), Giselle (1910), and Petrushka (1911), are counted among his greatest triumphs. Although Benois worked primarily with the Ballets Russes, he also collaborated with the Moscow Art Theatre and other notable theatres of Europe.

Surviving the upheaval of the Russian Revolution of 1917, Benois achieved recognition for his scholarship; he was selected as curator of the gallery of Old Masters in the Hermitage Museum at Leningrad, where he served from 1918 to 1926. During this time he secured his brother's heirloom Leonardo da Vinci painting of the Madonna for the museum. It became known as the Madonna Benois. Benois published his Memoirs in two volumes in 1955.

In 1927 he left Russia and settled in Paris. He worked primarily as a set designer after settling in France.

== Family ==
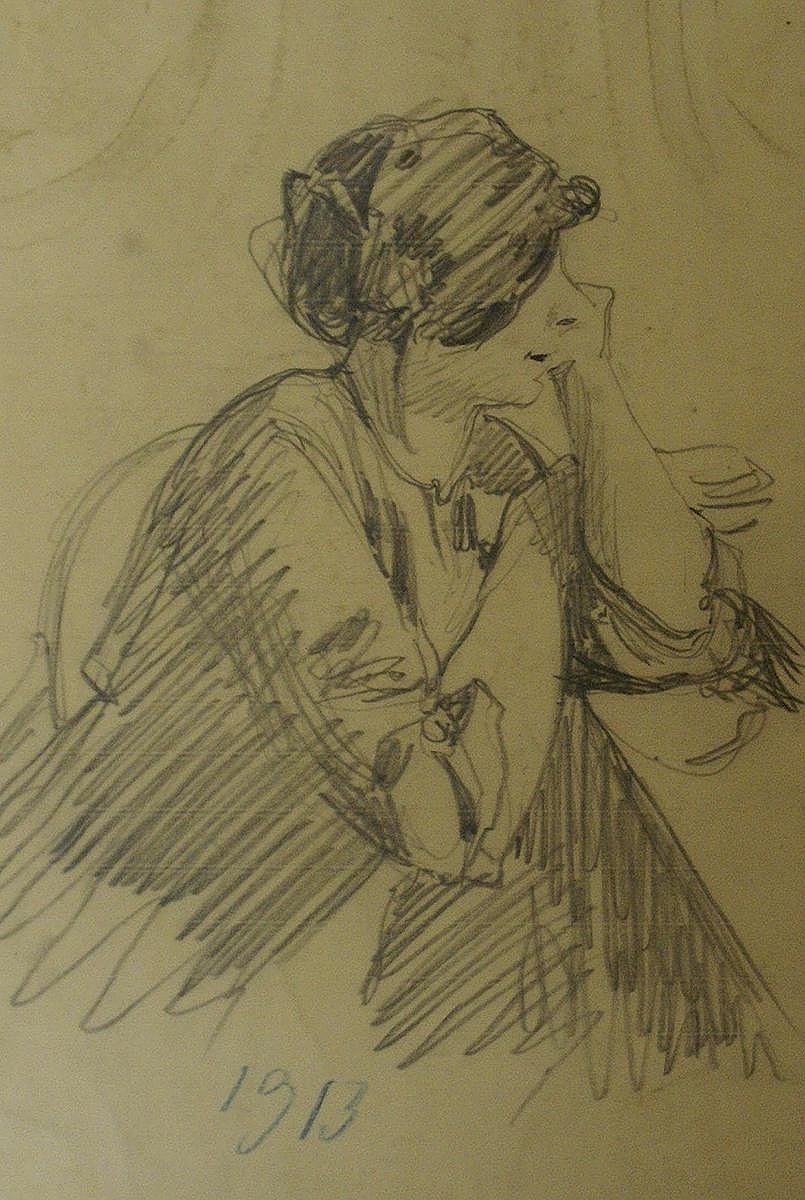
Anna Karlovna Benois by A.Benois (1913)

In 1894, Alexandre married Anna Karlovna Kind from a renowned Russian musical family. They first met in 1876 when Alexandre was learning music from the family patriarch, Karl Ivanovich Kind (who first came to Russia in the late 1840s, becoming a first violinist in the orchestra of the Saint Petersburg opera). Alexandre played a central role in the Russian artistic community both before and after the Revolution. Anna was always by his side. Her presence was positively remembered in the artistic circles with several mentions by artist like Mstislav Dobuzhinsky. She was a model painted by Léon Bakst, Valentin Serov, Zinaida Serebriakova, and others.

Notable family members include:

- Alexandre's son, Nicola Alexandrovich Benois (also known as Nikolai Benois), was born in 1901, and went on to become a celebrated opera designer, creating costumes and sets for opera companies all over the world.
- Alexandre's nephew, Nikolai Albertovich Benois, married the opera singer Maria Nikolaevna Kuznetsova.
- Alexandre was also the uncle of Eugene Lanceray and Zinaida Serebriakova, who became recognized Russian artists, and one of the great-uncles of the British actor Sir Peter Ustinov.
- Alexandre was the cousin of Hans von Bartels, of the Alsace Lorraine Bartels. Benois biography contains an entire chapter dedicated to Hans von Bartels.

=== See also ===
- Benois family

== Works ==
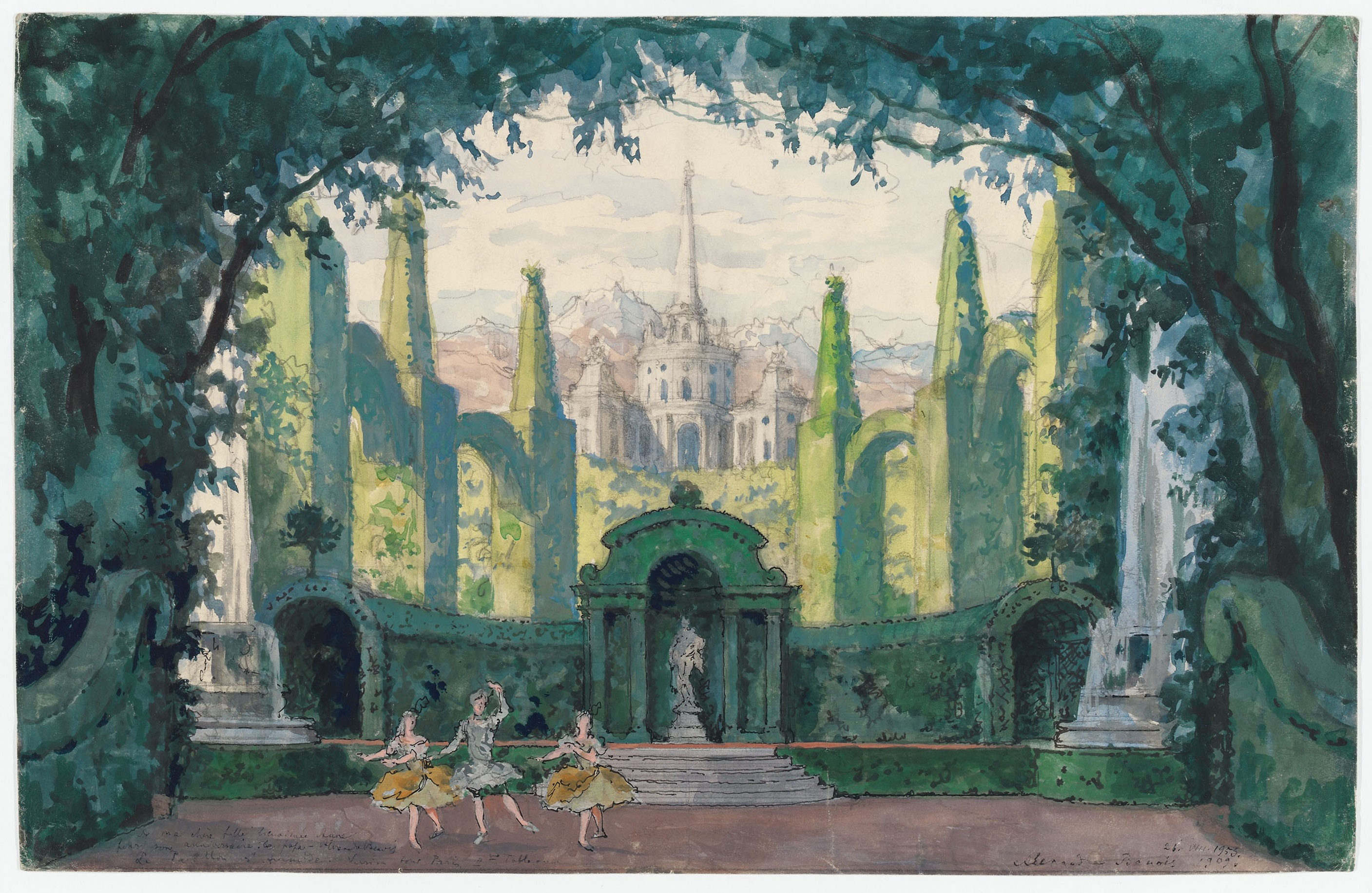
Set design for Le Pavillon d'Armide, Ballets Russes, 1909

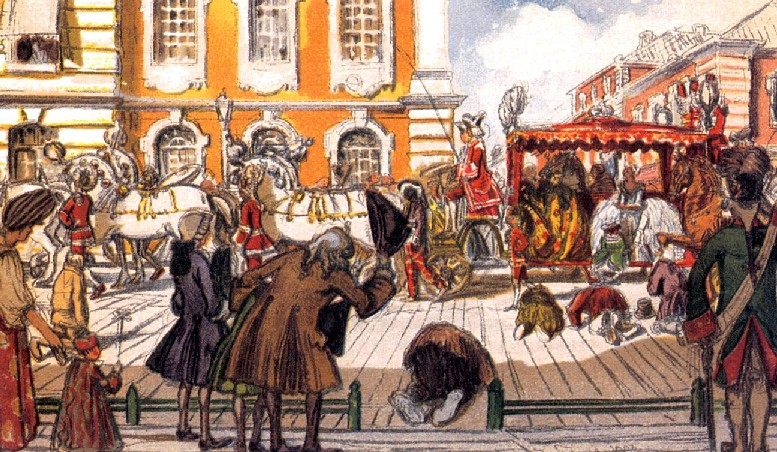
Promenade of Empress Elizabeth through the Noble Streets of Saint Petersburg, 1903

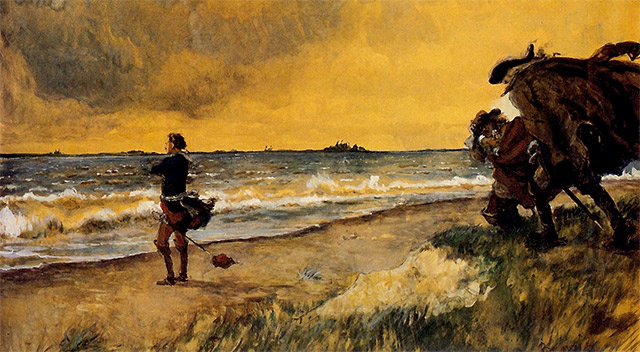
Peter the Great Meditating the Idea of Building Saint Petersburg at the Shore of the Baltic Sea

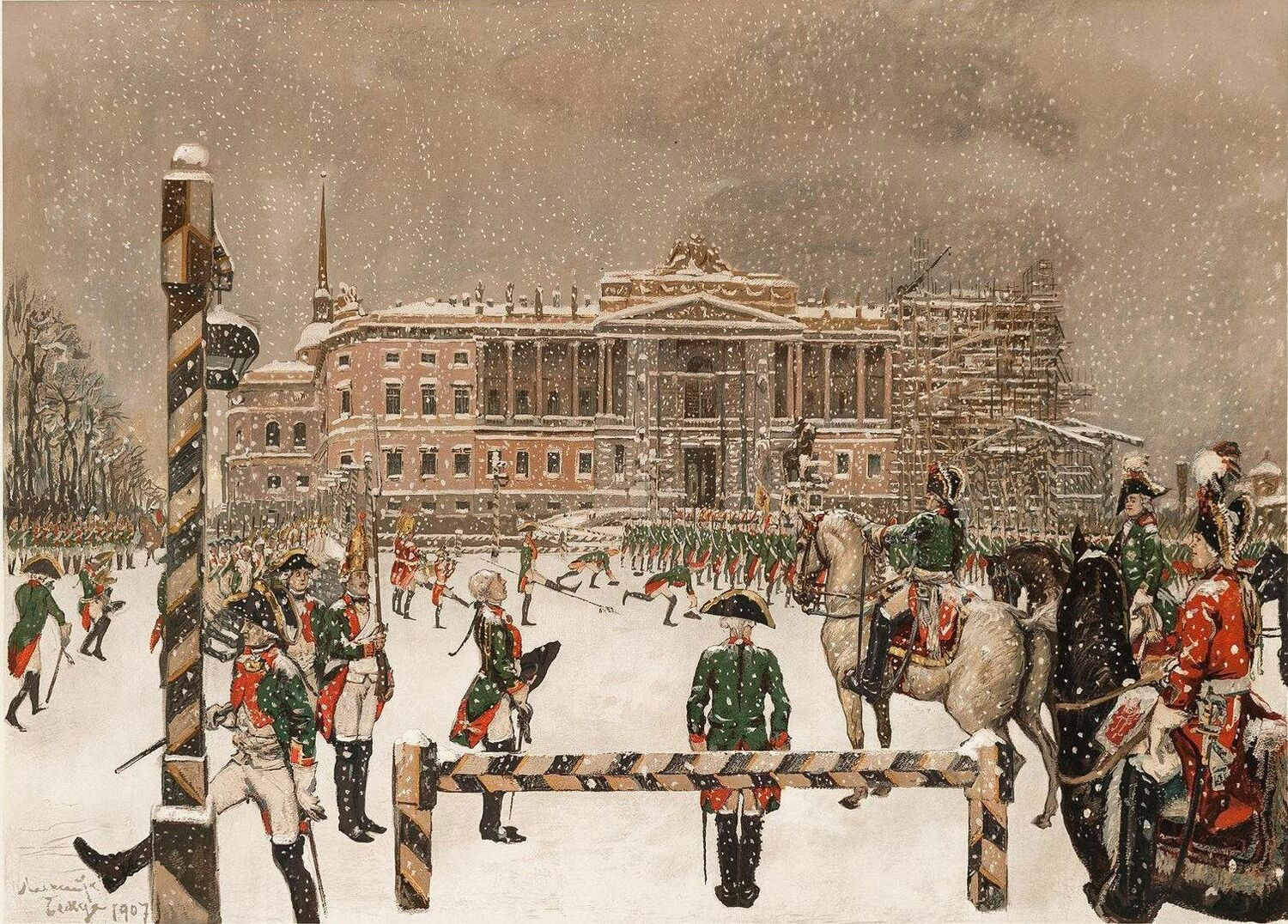
Military Parade of Emperor Paul in front of Mikhaylovsky Castle, 1907

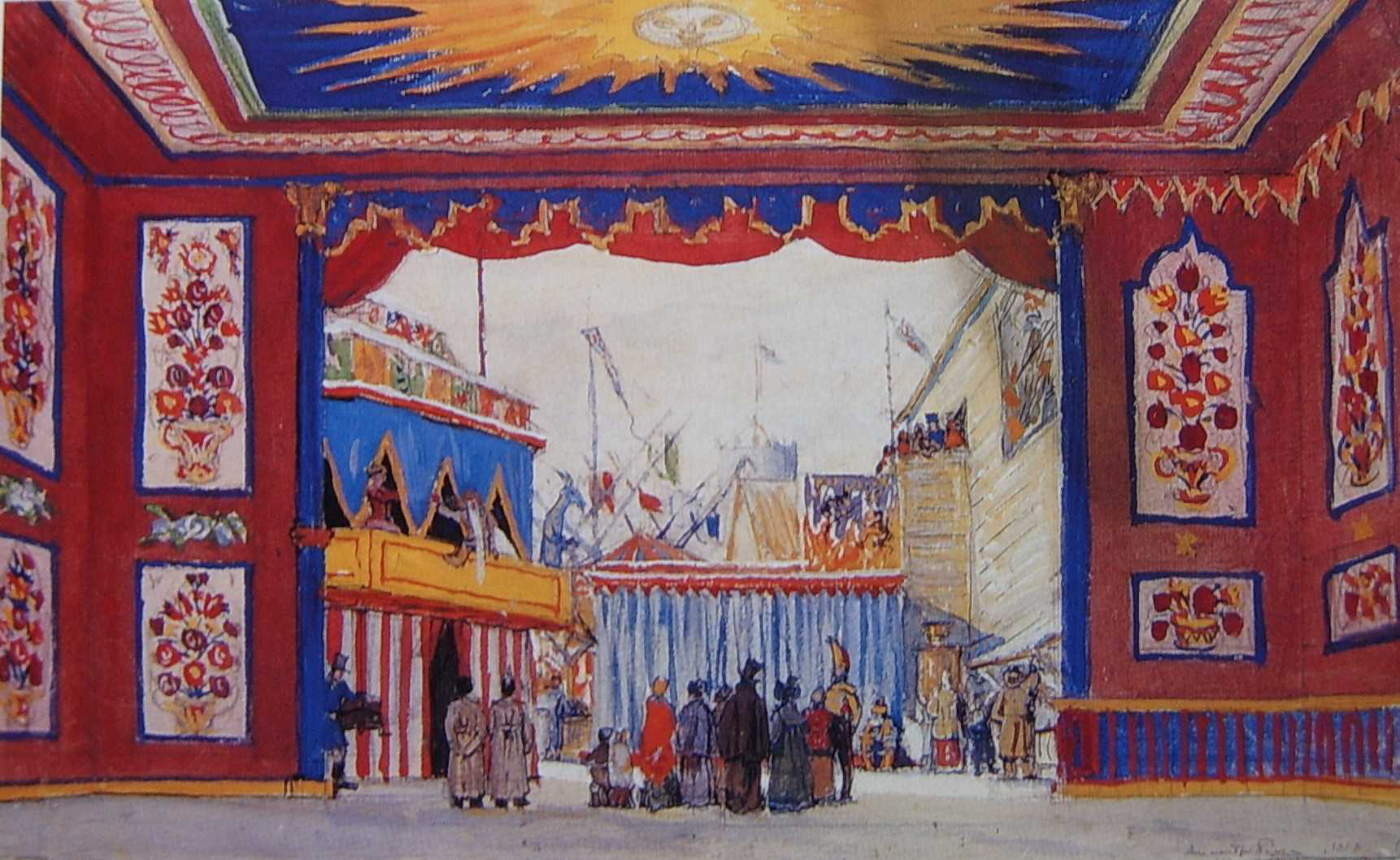
Set for Stravinsky's Petrushka, 1911

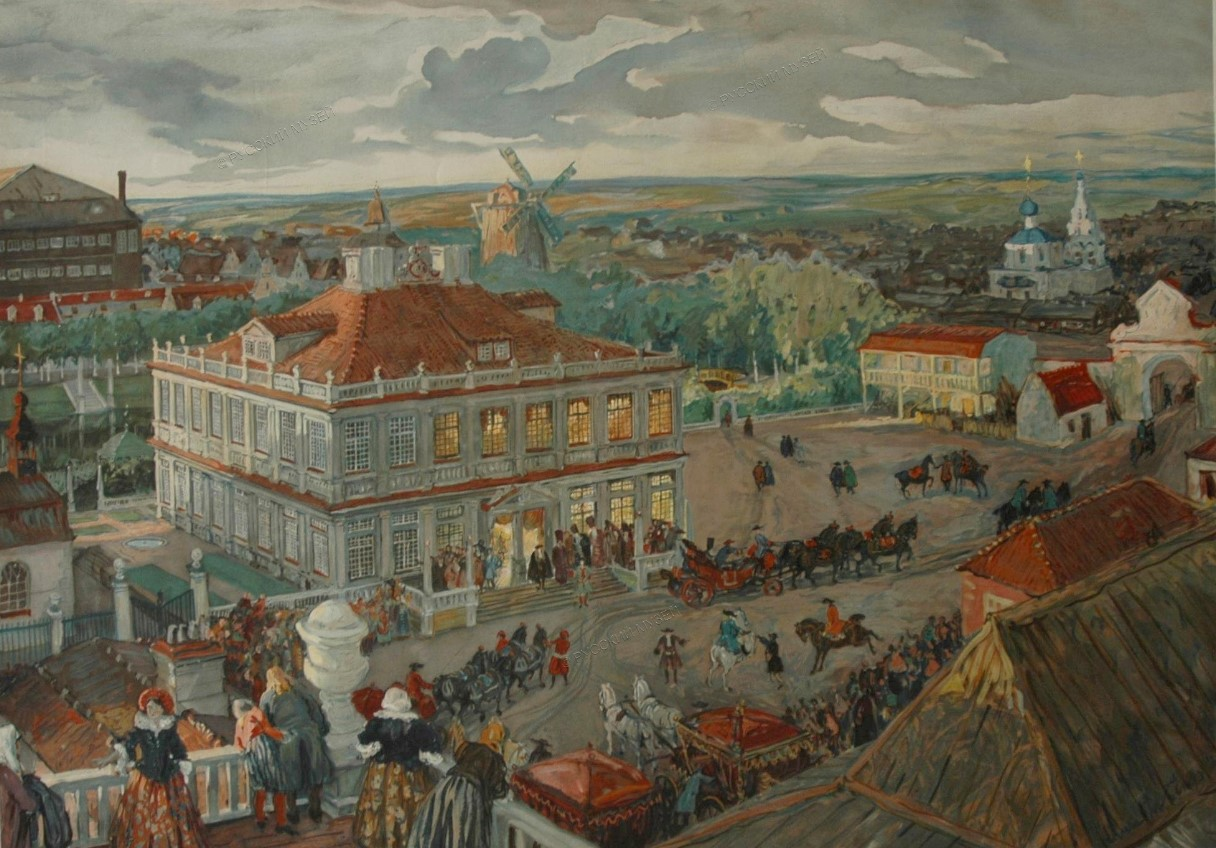
At the German Quarter, 1911

== Cultural depictions ==
- Anna Pavlova, film by Emil Loteanu; portrayed by Anatoli Romashin (1983).

== Bibliography ==
- "Бенуа, художники" . Brockhaus and Efron Encyclopedic Dictionary (in Russian). 1906.
- Katerina Clark, Petersburg: Crucible of the Cultural Revolution (Cambridge, MA, 1995).
- John E. Bowlt, The Silver Age: Russian Art of the Early Twentieth Century and the 'World of Art' Group (Newtonville, MA, 1982).
- Janet Kennedy, The Mir Iskusstva Group and Russian Art, 1898-1912 (New York, 1978).
- Sergei Makovskii, Stranitsy khudozhestvennoi kritiki – Kniga vtoraia: Sovremennye Russkie khudozhniki (Saint Petersburg, 1909).
- Gregory Stroud, Retrospective Revolution: A History of Time and Memory in Urban Russia, 1903-1923 (Urbana-Champaign, Illinois: University of Illinois at Urbana-Champaign, 2006).
