= Nicholas Benois =

Russian architect (1813–1898)

- Николай Бенуа
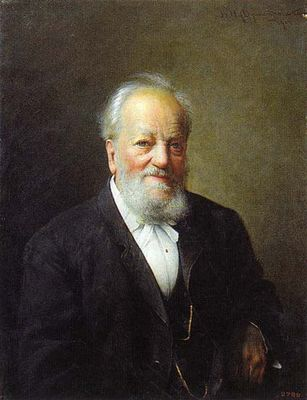
- Portrait by Viktor Dumitrashko, 1901; Russian Museum, Saint Petersburg
- Born: July 1, 1813; Saint Petersburg, Russian Empire
- Died: December 11, 1898 (aged 85); Saint Petersburg, Russian Empire
- Resting place: Church of the Visitation of the Blessed Virgin Mary, Saint Petersburg (burial destroyed)
- Education: Imperial Academy of Arts (1836)
- Known for: Architecture
- Spouse: Camilla Cavos (m. 1849; died 1891)
- Children: 5, including Alexandre, Albert and Leon
- Family: Benois
- Awards: Big Gold Medal of the Imperial Academy of Arts (1836)

Nicholas or Nikolai Leontievich Benois (Russian: Николай Леонтьевич Бенуа, romanized: Nikolay Leontyevich Benua; 13 July [O.S. 1 July] 1813 – 23 December [O.S. 11 December] 1898) was a Russian architect who worked in Peterhof and other suburbs of St. Petersburg.

== Biography ==
Benois was born in St. Petersburg, to Anna Katarina (née Groppe), who was of German descent, and a French father, Louis Jules Benois (from Brie, Saint-Ouen-sur-Morin). He studied at the Imperial Academy of Arts from 1827 to 1836. Eight years later, he was appointed a court architect to Nicholas I of Russia and oversaw several projects in the town of Peterhof, notably the Principal Imperial Stables (1847–52). He was quite notable in 19th-century Russia for adhering to the Gothic Revival style of architecture and decoration.

Benois designed some of the first railway stations in Russia, notably in Strelna, Tsarskoe Selo and New Peterhof, the last being considered his masterpiece. Later in his career he also worked in the Caucasus, where he designed the Summer Palace of the Viceroy in Likani, Georgia.

By his marriage to Camilla, daughter of Alberto Cavos who designed Mariinsky Theatre, Nicholas had four sons. Of these, Alexander Benois specialized in stage design, Albert Benois was a painter, and Leon Benois became a distinguished architect. His daughter married the sculptor Eugeny Alexandrovich Lanceray, and that marriage produced the artists Zinaida Serebriakova and Eugene Lanceray. The actor Peter Ustinov was a great-grandson.

== Selected works ==
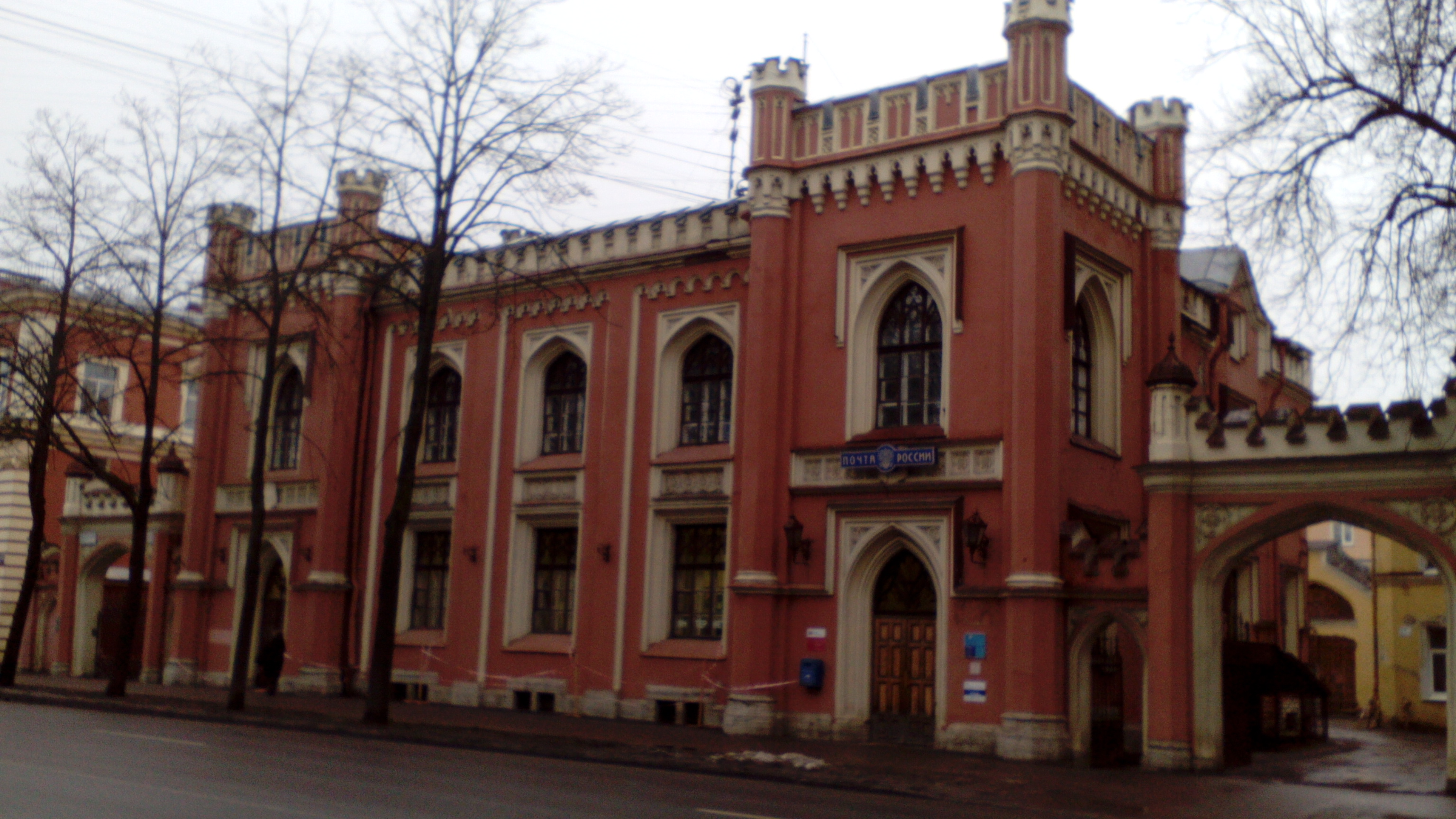
Post office in Peterhof

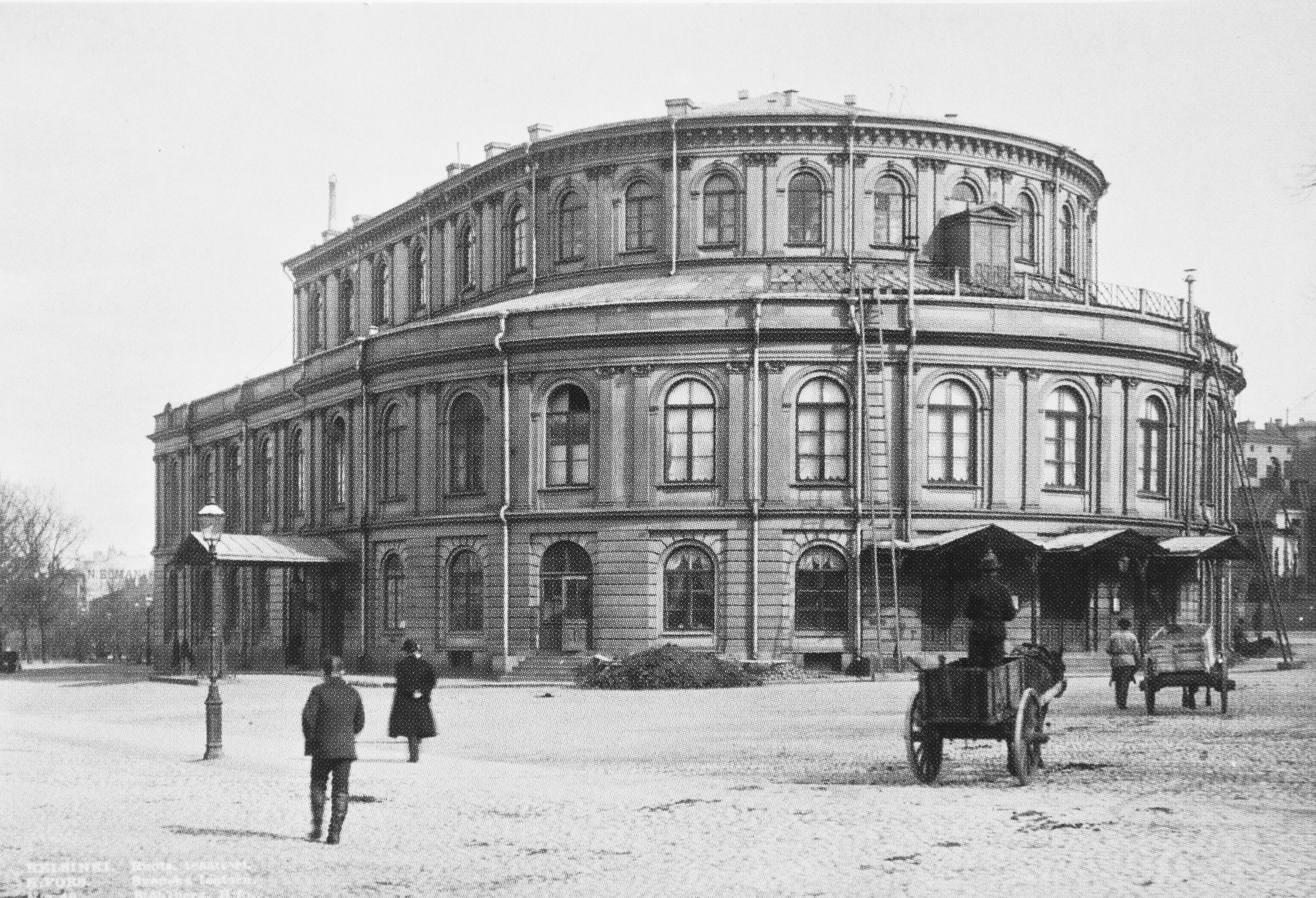
Swedish Theatre in Helsinki

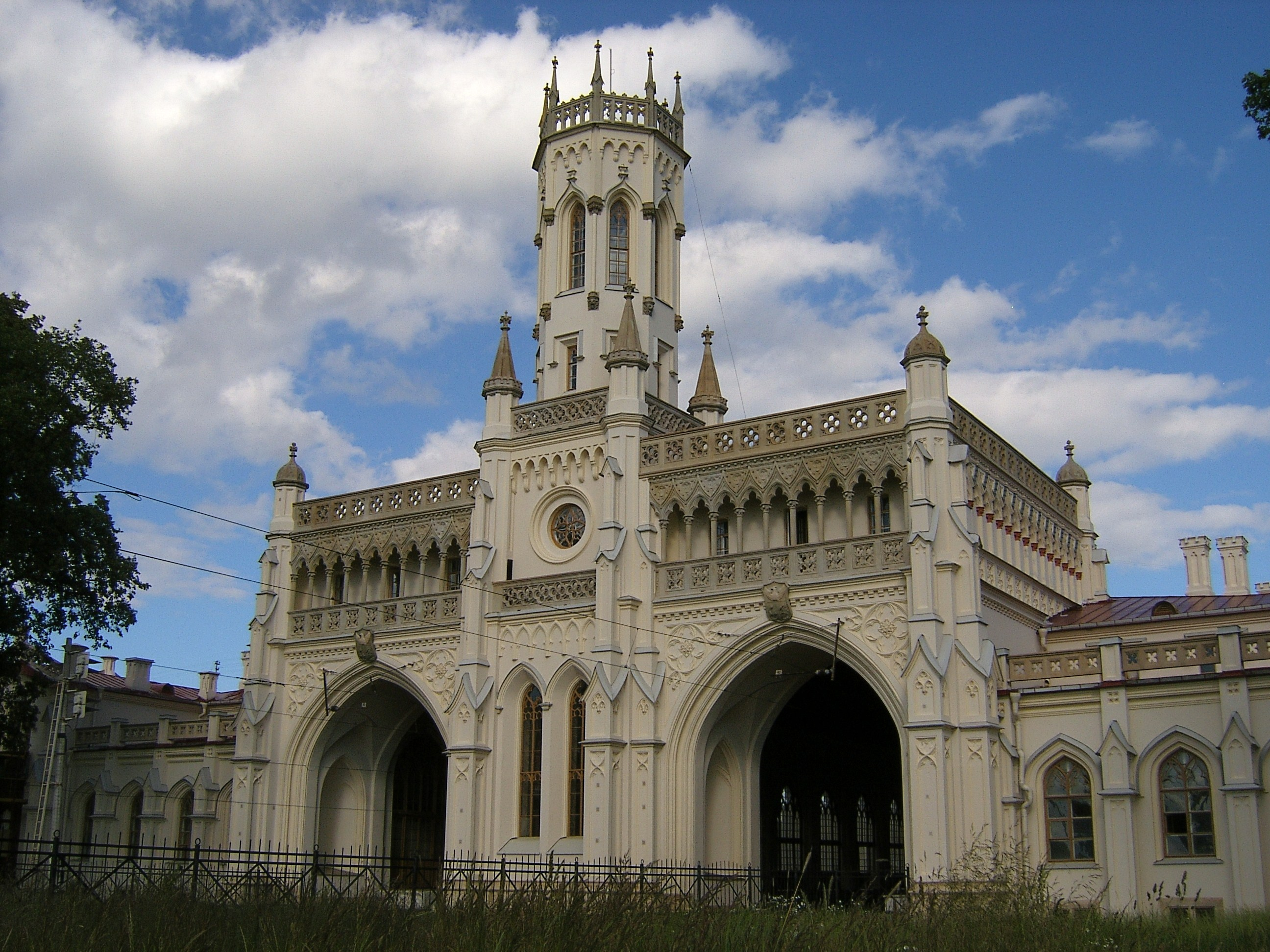
New Peterhof Railway Station

== Sources ==
- "Бенуа, Николай Леонтьевич" . Brockhaus and Efron Encyclopedic Dictionary (in Russian). 1906.
