= Leon Benois =

Russian architect (1856–1928)

- Леонтий Бенуа
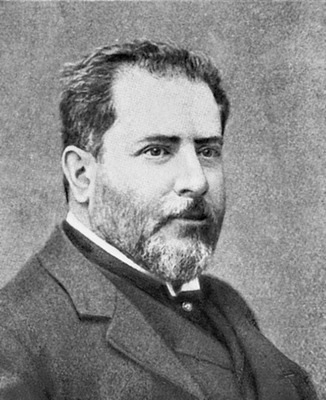
- Leon Benois (before 1917)
- Born: 11 August 1856; Petergof, Russia
- Died: 8 February 1928 (aged 71); Leningrad, Soviet Union
- Education: Imperial Academy of Arts (1879); Member Academy of Arts (1885); Professor by rank (1892); Full Member Academy of Arts (1893)
- Known for: Architecture
- Awards: Big Gold Medal of the Imperial Academy of Arts (1879)

Leon or Leonty Nikolayevich Benois (Russian: Лео́нтий Никола́евич Бенуа́, romanized: Leonty Nikolayevich Benua; 23 August [O.S. 11 August] 1856 – 8 February 1928) was a Russian architect from the Benois family.

== Biography ==
He was the son of architect Nicholas Benois, the brother of artists Alexandre Benois and Albert Benois. He built the Roman Catholic cathedral of Notre-Dame in St Petersburg, the mausoleum of the Grand Dukes of Russia in the Peter and Paul Fortress, the Russian Chapel in Darmstadt, and the Alexander Nevsky Cathedral, Warsaw, among many other works. Benois served as Dean of the Imperial Academy of Arts (1903–06, 1911–17) and edited the architecture magazine Zodchii. He gave his name to Leonardo da Vinci's painting Benois Madonna which he inherited from his father-in-law and presented to the Hermitage Museum. The painter Nadia Benois was his daughter, and the actor Sir Peter Ustinov was his grandson.

He died on 8 February 1928.

== See also ==
- Benois family

== Sources ==
- "Бенуа, художники" . Brockhaus and Efron Encyclopedic Dictionary (in Russian). 1906.
