= Russian Orthodox Cemetery, Nice =

Cemetery in France

Coordinates: 43°40′42″N 7°12′58″E

Cimetière russe de Nice
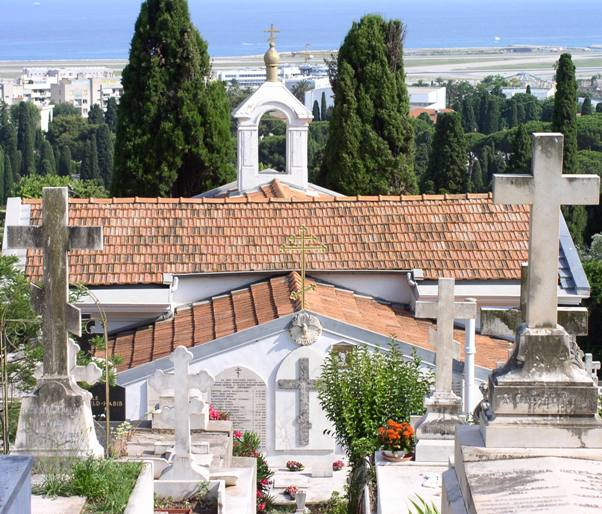
- Interactive map of Cimetière russe de Nice

Details
- Established: 1867; 159 years ago
- Location: Nice
- Country: France
- Type: Christian Orthodox cemetery

The Russian Orthodox Cemetery, Nice (French: Cimetière orthodoxe de Caucade) also known as the Orthodox cemetery in Caucade, is a cemetery located southwest of Nice, France.

== History and description ==
The cemetery was established on a plot bought by Russia in 1867 on the hill of Caucade, at a time when the Russian colony had an important role in the French Riviera.

3,000 Russians, including the descendants of Russian immigrants and refugees after the October Revolution and the members of Royal families, are buried at the cemetery. This includes Galitzine, Naryshkin, Obolensky, Volkonsky, Tsereteli and Gagarin families.

The cemetery chapel is dedicated to Saint Nicholas, in honor of the patron Nicholas Alexandrovich, Tsesarevich of Russia who died of tuberculosis in Nice.

The cemetery is open on Thursday and Saturday from 9:00 to 12:00 and on Friday and Sunday from 14:00 to 17:00. Liturgy on Saturday at 9:30. (Bus line 8 - station Caucade).

== Notables buried ==
- Georgy Adamovich (1892–1972), Russian poet, and a literary critic, translator and memoirist
- Paul Alexandrovich Demidov (1869–1935), art collector, one of the founders of the Academy of Arts in Nice in 1921, and in the Society of Friends of the Russian Museum in 1929, fellow chairman of the Russian Historical and Genealogical Society in France.
- Princess Catherine Dolgorukaya-Yurievskaya (1847–1922), Emperor Alexander II's morganatic wife
- Vladimir Golenishchev (1856–1947), Russian Egyptologist
- Princess Helen of Serbia (1884–1962)
- Magnus Hirschfeld (1868–1935), German physician, sexologist and LGBT rights activist
- Filipp Malyavin (1869–1940), Russian painter
- Prince Rostislav Alexandrovich Romanov (1902–1978)
- Princess Marina Petrovna Romanova (1892–1981)
- A.K.Rudanovsky (1873-1933), art collector, patron
- General Dmitry Shcherbachev (1857–1932)
- Serge Voronoff (1866–1951), French surgeon
- General Nikolai Yudenich (1862–1933)

== Gallery ==
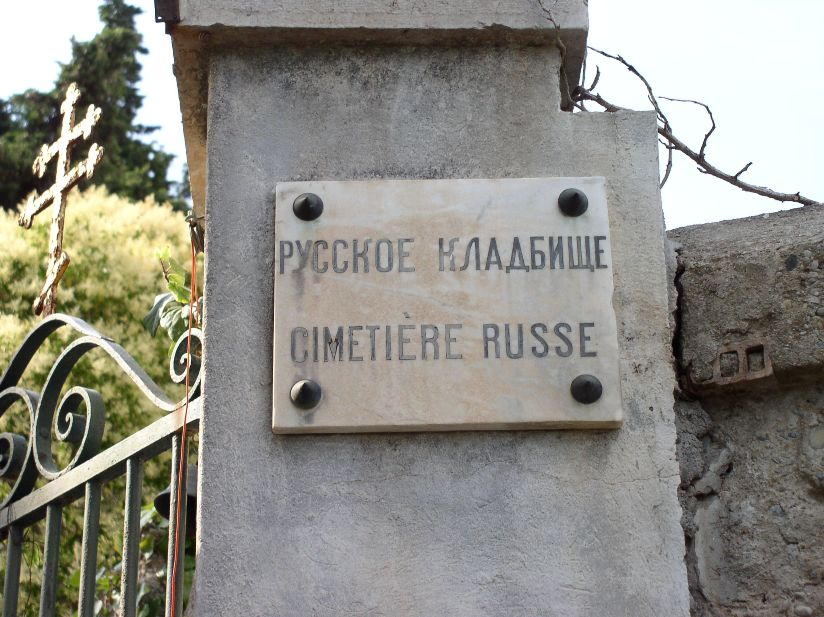

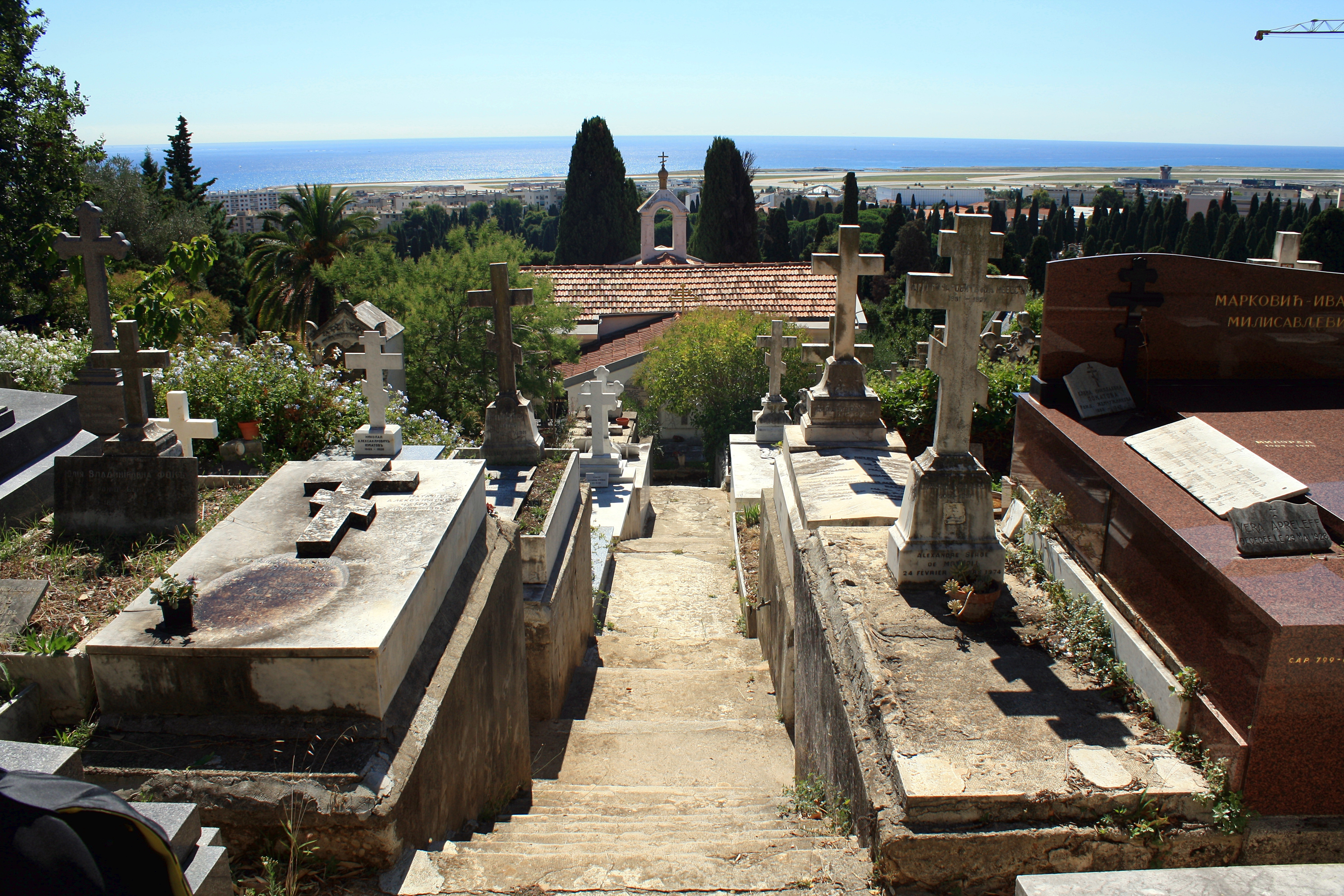

== External links and references ==
- History
- Nice (06) : cimetière de Caucade – Cimetières de France et d'ailleurs
- Russian Orthodox Cemetery, Nice at Find a Grave
