= Filipp Malyavin =

Russian painter

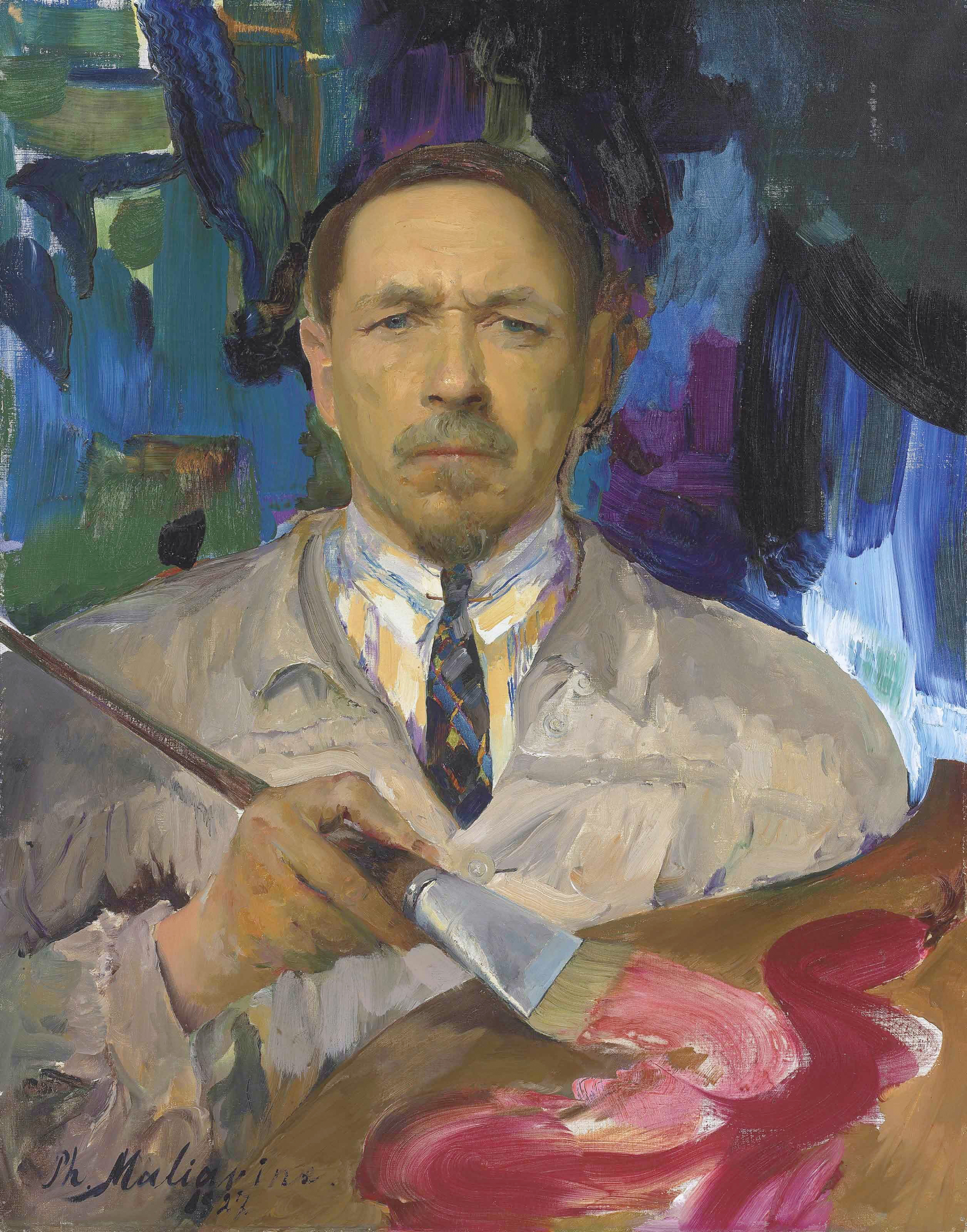
- Self-portrait (1927)
- Born: October 11, 1869; Kazanka, Samara Governorate, Russia
- Died: December 23, 1940 (aged 71); Nice, Vichy France
- Resting place: Caucade Cemetery, Nice
- Education: Higher Art School (1899)
- Known for: Painting
- Elected: Member Academy of Arts (1906)

Filipp Andreevich Malyavin (Russian: Фили́пп Андре́евич Маля́вин; 22 October [O.S. 10 October] 1869 – December 23, 1940) was a Russian painter and draftsman. Trained in icon-painting as well as having studied under the great Russian realist painter Ilya Repin, Malyavin is unusual among the Russian artists of the time for having a peasant background. It is possibly due to this that his paintings often depict peasant life, and his most famous work, Whirlwind, shows peasant women dancing.

== Biography ==
Filipp Malyavin was born in the large village of Kazanka (Samara Governorate, now Totsky District, Orenburg Oblast), into a poor peasant family with many children. Even as a child, he was drawn towards art, drawing and creating clay figurines of birds and animals from the age of five.

The village was visited by traveling monks, who would bring with them icons from Mount Athos, in Greece. Fascinated by the icons, Malyavin convinced his parents to allow him to go to Athos to study icon-painting. At the age of sixteen, he traveled to Greece with a monk from Athos, his journey financed by the villagers themselves.

Although the monasteries at Athos were famed for their vast collections of Greek manuscripts and books, the art of icon painting was not actually practiced there. Malyavin was disappointed to learn that they only made copies of Russian icons. Having used up his money and thus unable to return to Russia, Malyavin entered the monastery as a novice, and was charged with painting icons and murals.

This continued until 1891, when Malyavin met Vladimir Beklemishev, a Russian sculptor and professor at the Saint Petersburg Academy of Arts who was on a visit to Athos. Beklemishev was greatly impressed by Malyavin's work and invited him to Petersburg.

In March 1892, Malyavin arrived in St. Petersburg and, with Beklemishev's help, was enrolled in the Academy of Arts. Due to the Academy reforms of 1894, Malyavin was able to choose his own teacher after completing the Academy curriculum. His options included such great artists as Vladimir Makovsky and Arkhip Kuindzhi. However, Malyavin applied for, and was accepted into, the studio of Russian realist Ilya Repin, who among others, also taught Igor Grabar, Konstantin Somov, Anna Ostroumova-Lebedeva, and Boris Kustodiev.

It was here, in Repin's studio, that Malyavin began creating some of his most famous early works, including Peasant Girl Knitting a Stocking (1895), which is the first of his paintings in which he introduces his favorite color, red. Three of these early works, all depicting peasant women, were exhibited at the Moscow Art Lovers' Society Salon. Two of these were bought by Pavel Tretyakov for the Tretyakov Gallery.

Malyavin also began to perfect his style of portraiture, creating another series of paintings depicting his fellow-artists from Repin's studio. Among the best of these is that of Konstantin Somov, who would later found the World of Art group. Malyavin's fame spread quickly, and it was not long before society grandees such as Baroness Wolf and Mme. Popova began coming to him to have their portraits painted.

From 1895 to 1899, Malyavin painted frenetically. In 1897, he was awarded the status of Artist, but only after much debate, and for his series of portraits rather than his competition painting, Laughter, which depicted Russian women in red dresses in a green meadow. His work was too different, too bright, and it had no plot - it did not fit the contemporary art scene at the time.

Thus, in 1900, Malyavin traveled to Paris, and took France by storm. French newspapers hailed him as "a credit to Russian painting," and Laughter was awarded a gold medal and bought by the Museo d'arte moderno in Venice. His work was suddenly in demand, with the Luxembourg Museum in Paris buying Three Women.

On returning to Russia, Malyavin married Natalia Novaak-Sarich, the daughter of a rich industrialist from Odessa and a private student at the Higher Art School. They settled in a village near Ryazan, and Malyavin devoted himself entirely to his art. His work began appearing in the salons of the World of Art group, and the Union of Russian Artists.

Malyavin reached his peak between 1905 and 1907, during Russia's revolutionary crisis. Unlike other painters, at this time he focused on his "peasant" canvases. These paintings are unusual in terms of their use of bright colors and their large scales, which mark them more than their usually generic titles.

In 1906, Malyavin painted Whirlwind, his greatest painting, and the Assembly of the Academy of Arts awarded him the rank of "Academician," "in consideration of his fame in the field of art."

Between 1908 and 1910, Malyavin did not display any work, and the official art critics began attacking him more and more frequently. He traveled to Paris, and on his return, painted a large family portrait, which he exhibited in January 1911, at the salon of the Union of Russian Artists. The painting was a failure, and between 1911 and 1915, Malyavin exhibited only the works of the earlier period.

In 1918, Malyavin moved with his family to Ryazan, where he participated in the Ryazan Commissariat for Education's propaganda of art and taught. In 1920, he went to Moscow, where he was admitted to the Kremlin and made drawings for Lenin's portrait. He also painted a portrait of Anatoly Lunacharsky, and his works were displayed in Moscow exhibitions.

In fall of 1922, Malyavin traveled abroad with his family yet again, to organize a traveling exhibition of his works. The family settled in Paris, where he painted portraits on commission and where his work was exhibited in 1924. In 1933, he toured Yugoslavia, Czechoslovakia, England, and Sweden, exhibiting his work, and in 1935 and 1937, he exhibited his work in London, Stockholm, and Nice.

Malyavin died on December 23, 1940, in Nice; he's interred into the Caucade Cemetery. He is noted for changing the portrayal of peasants in Russian painting and for his brilliant use of color.

Filipp Malyavin's works

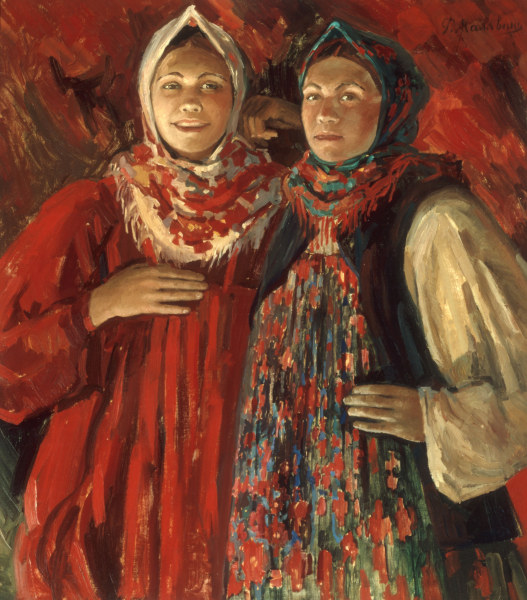
Two Russian beauties (circa 1905)

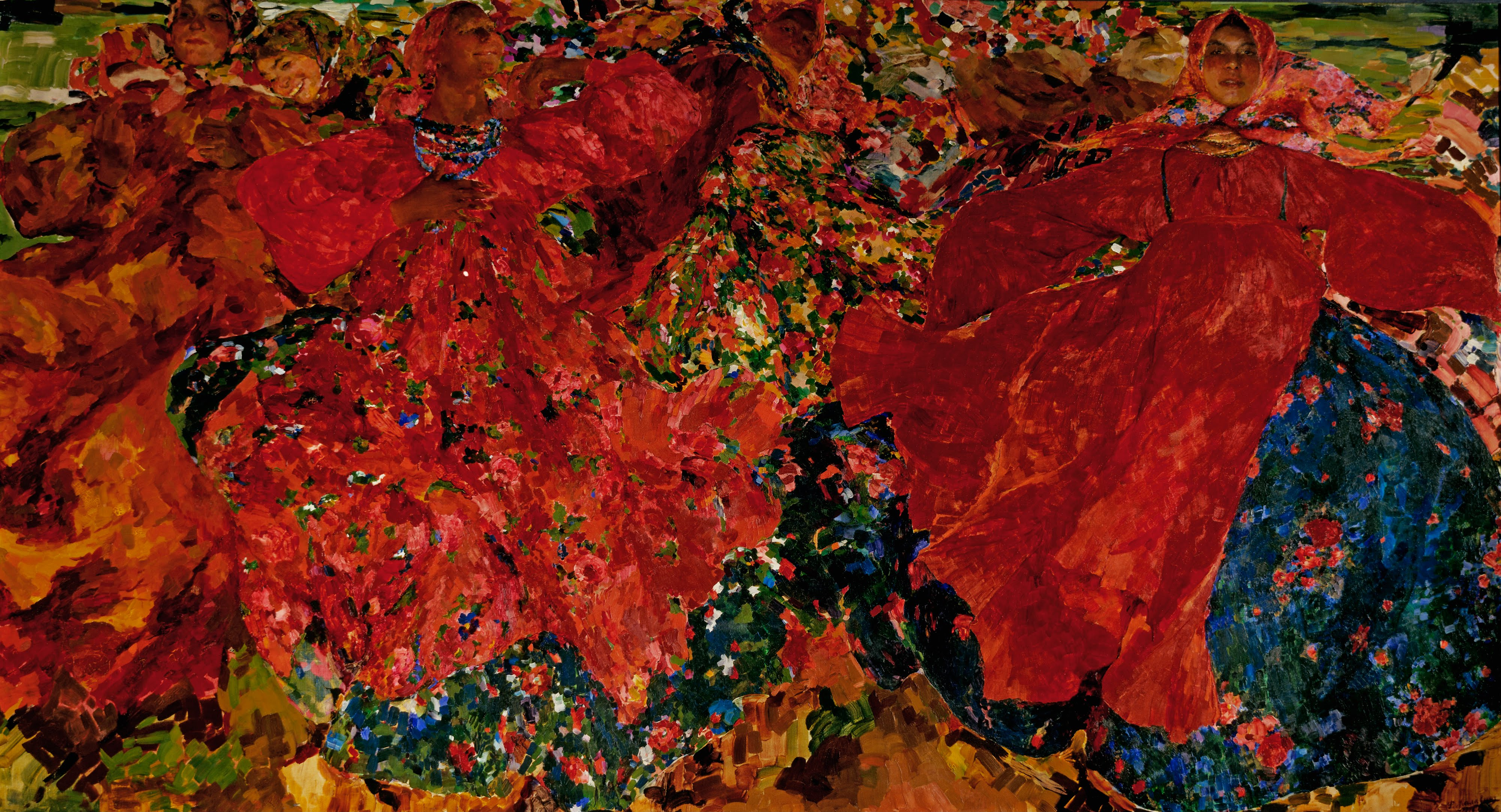
Whirlwind (1906)

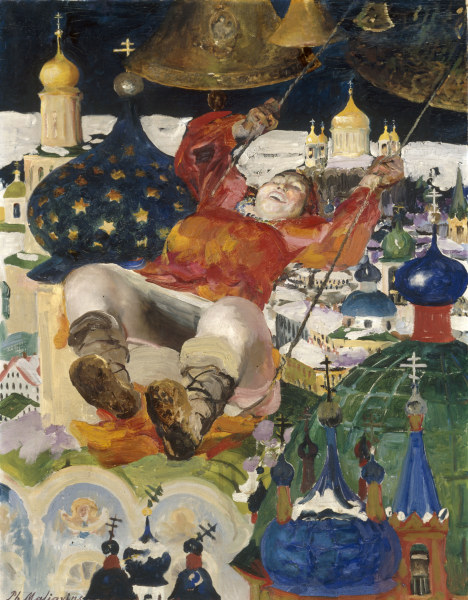
Young woman on a swing
(circa 1910)

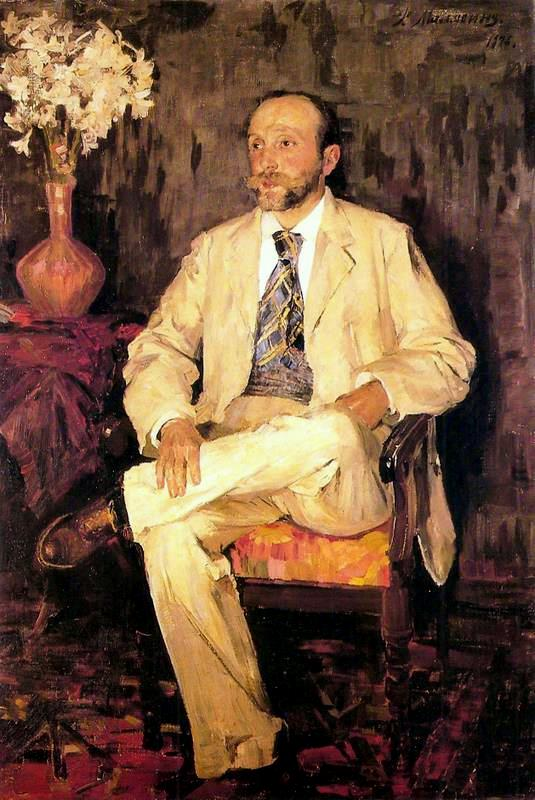
Ambassador Smirnoff (1926)

== Literature ==
- С. Н. Кондаков (1915). Юбилейный справочник Императорской Академии художеств. 1764-1914 (in Russian). Vol. 2. p. 122.
