= Draughtsman =

A draughtsman (British spelling) or draftsman (American spelling) may refer to:

== People ==
- An architectural drafter, who produced architectural drawings until the late 20th century
- An artist who produces drawings that rival or surpass their other types of artwork
- A drafter who prepares technical drawings
- A law costs draftsman who settles the costs of legal fees
- A parliamentary draftsman who prepares legislation

== Other uses ==
- Draughtsman, a playing piece in the game of draughts
- "The Draughtsman", an episode of British TV series Juliet Bravo (1980)
