= Cosroe Dusi =

Italian painter (1808–1859)

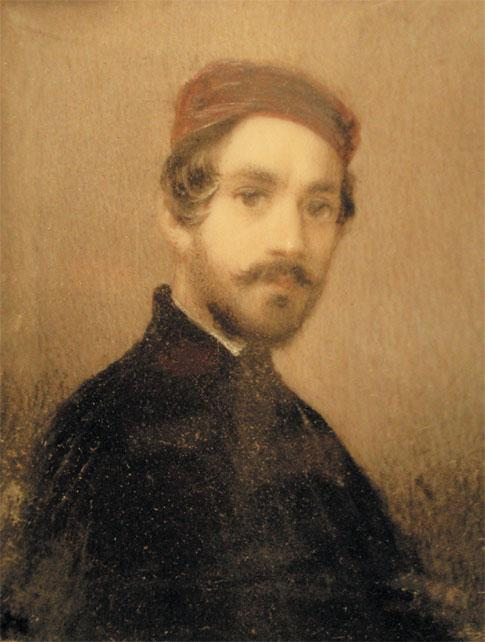
- Self-portrait, c. 1830
- Born: July 28, 1808; Venice
- Died: October 9, 1859 (aged 51); Marostica
- Education: Accademia di Belle Arti di Venezia
- Known for: Painting
- Style: Neoclassicism
- Elected: Member Academy of Arts (1842); Professor by rank (1851)

Cosroe Dusi (July 28, 1808 – October 9, 1859) was an Italian painter in the Neoclassical style, active for many years in St Petersburg, Russia, painting mainly sacred and historical subjects. Dusi was nicknamed by his contemporaries the "modern Tintoretto", for his liveliness of invention and rapidity at painting.

== Education and early work in the Veneto and Tyrol ==
Cosroe was born in Venice. He enrolled in 1820 at the Academy of Fine Arts of Venice, where his mentor was the painter Teodoro Matteini, who had also taught the influential Hayez. At the academy, Dusi studied alongside Michelangelo Grigoletti.

After graduating in 1827, the academy awarded Dusi a room near the school and he exhibited the large historical canvas, The Death of Alcibiades, followed by Paolo and Francesca da Rimini, exhibited in 1831 at the Brera. In 1829 at the annual exhibition of the Accademia, he displayed The Nymph Salmacis seduces the innocent Hermaphroditus, a Virgin and child with St John, and two small paintings depicting scenes from writings of Gasparo Gozzi. In 1830 he married Antonietta Ferrari, daughter and sister respectively of the sculptors Bartolomeo and Luigi Ferrari. Luigi had also studied at the academy with Dusi.

In Venice, Dusi collaborated in the production of illustrations for books and lithographic series. For the journal of Il Gondoliere, he made a lithographic portrait Leopoldo Cicognara, that was used in Cicognara's obituary in 1834, and was based on a prior oil painting by Ludovico Lipparini. Dusi, along with Grigoletti and Michele Fanoli, completed a series of lithographs depicting various trades of Venetians, published by Galvani. The subjects were mostly genre figures (fishmongers, chimney sweeps, etc.) or portraits (including singers, actors, and dancers). The Museo Correr of Venice has engravings and lithography by Drusi. He also traveled through Monaco, Germany, and Russia.

In 1831 he was commissioned to paint the main altarpiece depicting Saints Peter and Paul and another altarpiece of Virgin of the Rosary and St Dominic for the parish church of the same name in Sexten in Tyrol. He painted St Luke painting the Virgin (right lateral altar, 1833) and the Assumption of Mary (1834, main altarpiece) of the Sanctuary of Santa Assunta of Maria Luggau in West Carinthia. He also painted frescoes on the Resurrection of the Dead for the chapel in the cemetery of Cortina d'Ampezzo. Among his other religious paintings are his Adoption of the Habit by St Gertrude (1835) for the main altar of the parish church of Mühlwald; in 1836 he completed an altarpiece depicting a Santa Maria Assunta (1836) for the side altar of a parish church near Bruneck; a Crucifixion for the parish church of St Michael at Brixen; and a Glory of Saint Catherine for the main altar of the parish church of Graun im Vinschgau; and a Transit of St Joseph (1839) for the church of San Luca Evangelista in Padua.

For the parish church of St Martin in Gsies, he painted the altarpiece depicting Communion of St Martin, bishop of Tours. For the church of Santa Maria Assunta of Taufers, he painted a Holy Family with young St John the Baptist (1839).

Dusi was commissioned to complete the main altarpiece of the Collegiata of Santa Maria Maggiore of the main city of the Dalmatian island of Cherso (now Cres, Croatia). A fire in 1826 had destroyed the ancient Renaissance altarpiece of Andrea Vicentino, depicting The Miracle of the Madonna of the Snow. Dusi attempted to make an accurate copy (1833) of the icon. In 1834 he painted an altarpiece of Saints Filomena, Lucy, and Agatha (1834) for the Venetian church of San Martino.

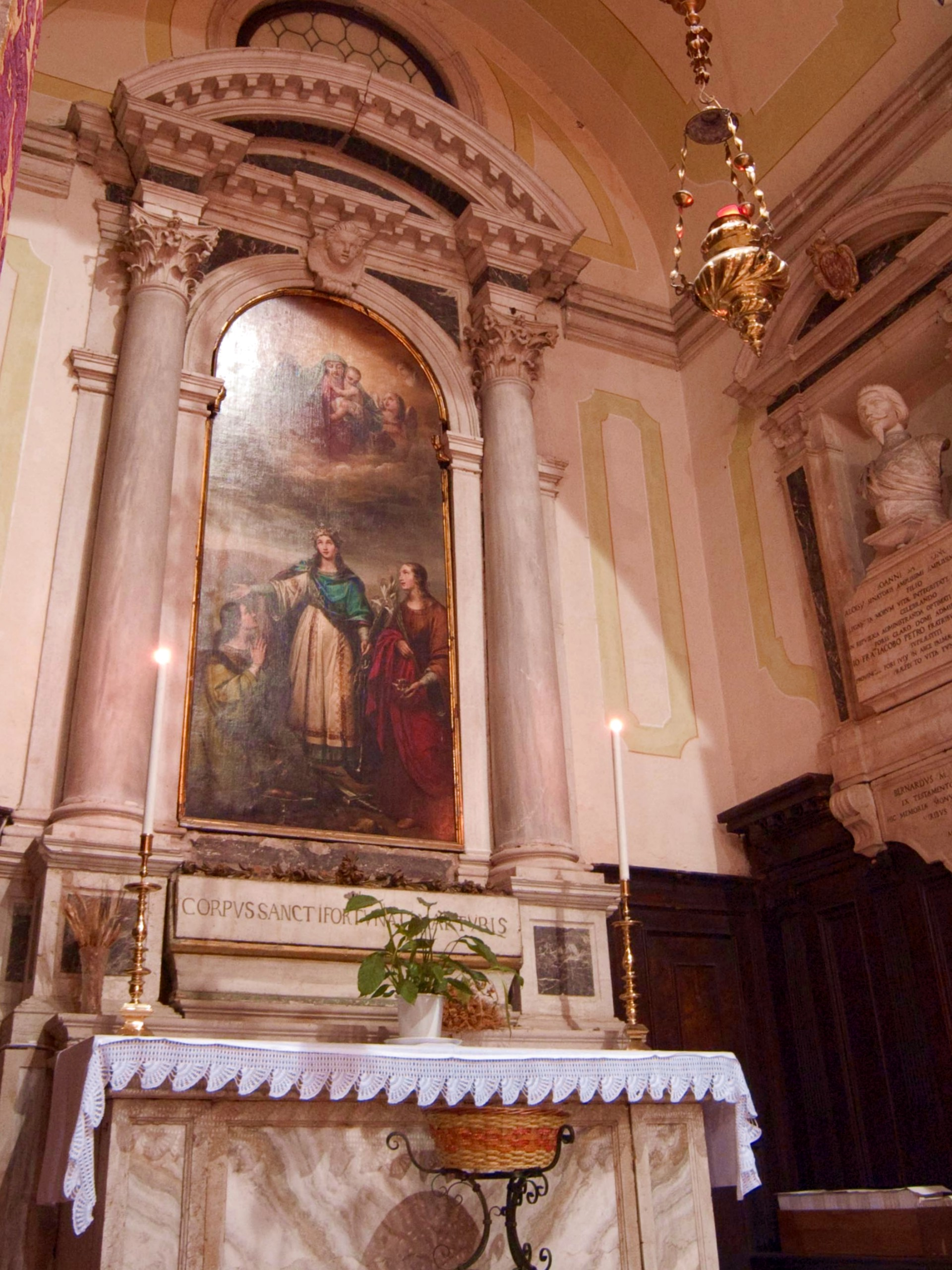
Saints Filomena, Lucy, and Agatha Painting by Cosroe Dusi, San Martino Church

After the Teatro La Fenice burned down in a fire, Dusri was commissioned in 1837–1838 to paint the sipario (main drop-curtain) for the newly rebuilt theater house. The subject of the curtain was, appropriately, the Apotheosis of the Phoenix, however, by 1854, this curtain was replaced by a more patriotic and nationalistic scene. Drusi also painted screens for the San Samuele theater of Venice and the Nobile theater of Udine. The subject of the latter was Michelangelo presenting the young Giovanni da Udine to the Duke Gonzaga.

In 1838, Drusi designed and Giovan Francesco Locatelli engraved prints celebrating the visit of Emperor Ferdinand I of Austria. The subjects were Celebration of the Completion of the Dam of Malamocco and Entry of the Emperor into Chioggia. For an exhibition held in the Venetian Academy to celebrate the visit, Drusi displayed seven works: Romeo and Juliet; the Communion of St Martin of Tours, (Socrates reproaches) Alcibiades among the Heterae; the Prayers of his bride convince Henry IV to absolve the prisoners of Calais; a Landscape, Portraits of a family, and finally an unspecified sketch for a historical painting.

== Work in Russia ==
Dusi had briefly lived in Munich, Bavaria, where he had painted mainly portraits, but around 1840, the Grand Duke Nicholas of Russia, after visiting his Venetian studio, invited Dusi to St Petersburg. In Russia, he painted portraits of the Grand Duke and members of the imperial family and the court, including General Suhozanet (1842), Kavos (1849), of Feodosiya Tarassova Gromova. His Mary Queen of Scots led to the scaffold granted him membership in the Academy of Fine Arts of St. Petersburg in 1842, another painting of Alcibiades among the Heterae, made him an academician (1843), and finally, his Deposition, obtained him a post of professor (1851). In Russia, he also painted still lifes and landscapes. He participated in the encaustic decoration of the wooden ceiling of the gallery of ancient painting of the Hermitage, depicting the Seasons and antique artworks and buildings, (based on drawings by Georg Hiltensperger). Dusi also painted numerous icons for the Cathedral of Saint Isaac in St Petersburg, later replaced by copies in mosaic, depicting: the Savior and Mary, Mother of God, for the right side of the altar iconostasis, a Last Supper, a Deposition, St Anastasia and St Catherine of Alexandria (1844–1855). He painted for private chapels of the buildings of the capital and country estates.

Dusi decorate the ceiling of the Mariinsky Theatre and two curtains, both lost, one for the Bolshoi Theatre in Moscow, depicting the Entrance of Prince Pozharsky into Moscow, and the other, probably for the Alexandrine theater of St Petersburg in 1858. The czar awarded him the Order of St. Anne of third class and the Order of St Stanislaus of third class.

== Return to Venice ==
In 1831, Dusi had been made honorary associate for the Venetian Academy, and he had over the years periodically revisited his native Venice. He returned to Venice to stay finally in 1856, and hoped without success, for a professorship in the academy. The Austrian painter Karl von Blaas was instead named to the professorship. His last known work, A vigil at home of Tintoretto, exhibited in Venice in 1857. He painted two altarpieces: St Anthony of Padua and a Deposition (1851) for the Venetian church of San Giovanni in Bragora.

He died on October 9, 1859, in Marostica, near Vicenza.

== Gallery ==
Narrative paintings

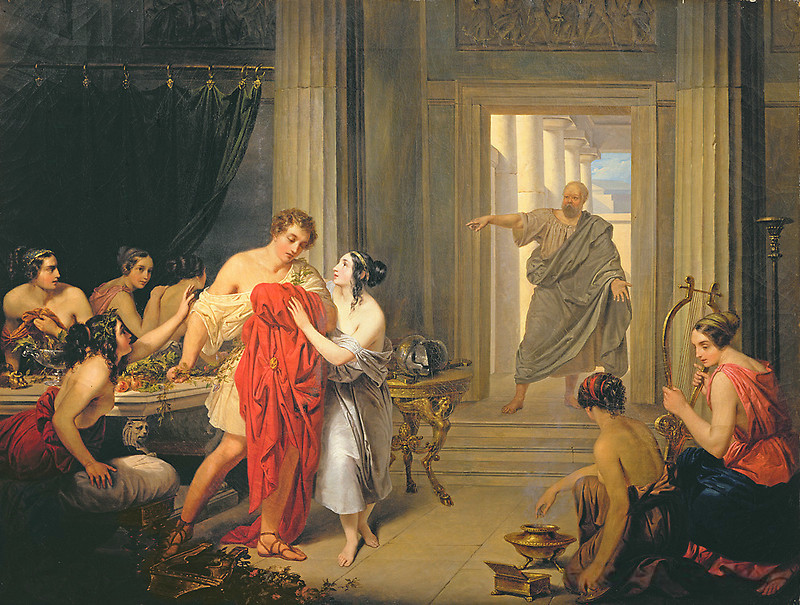
Alcibiades amongst the Hetaerae, c. 1835

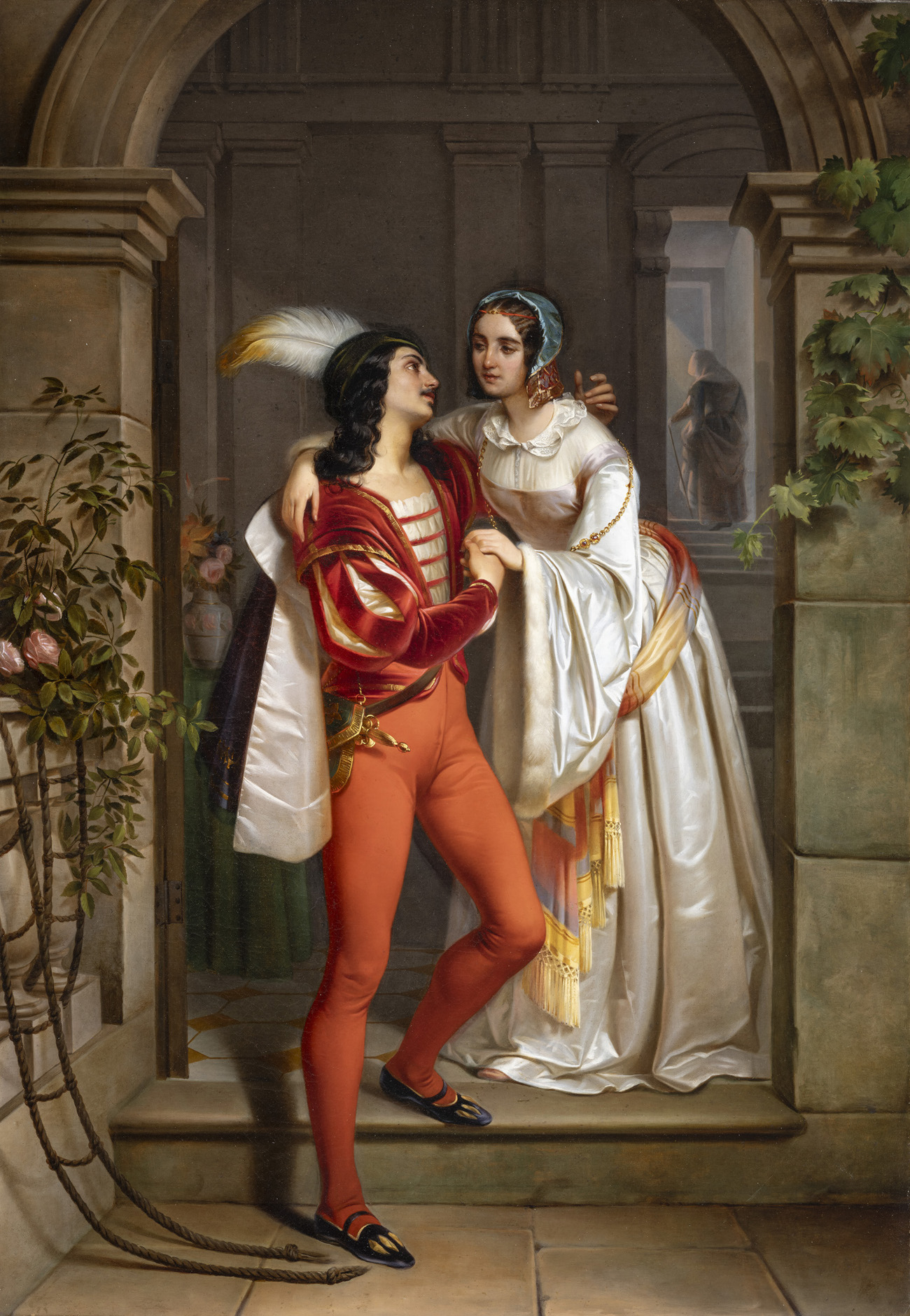
Romeo and Juliet, 1838
Portrait paintings

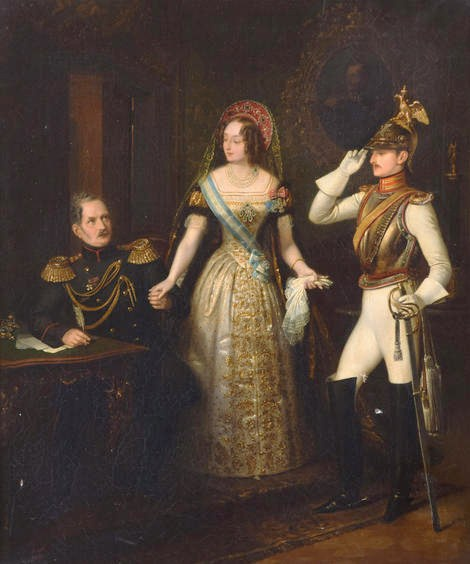
Count Alexey Fyodorovich Orlov and His Family, 1845

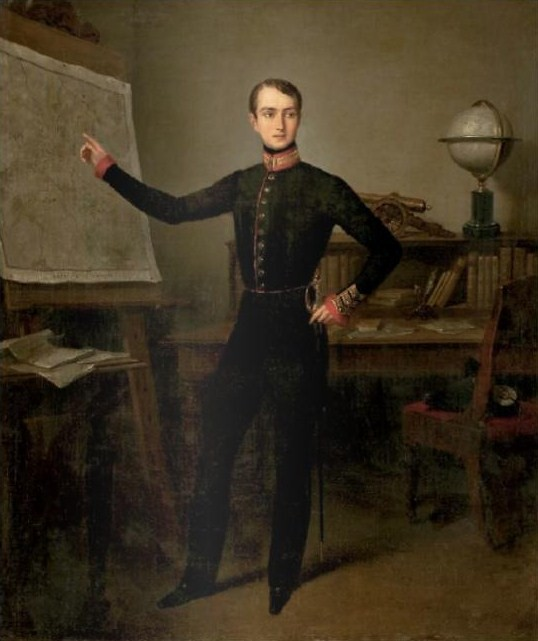
Count Nikolay Alexeyevich Orlov, c. 1845

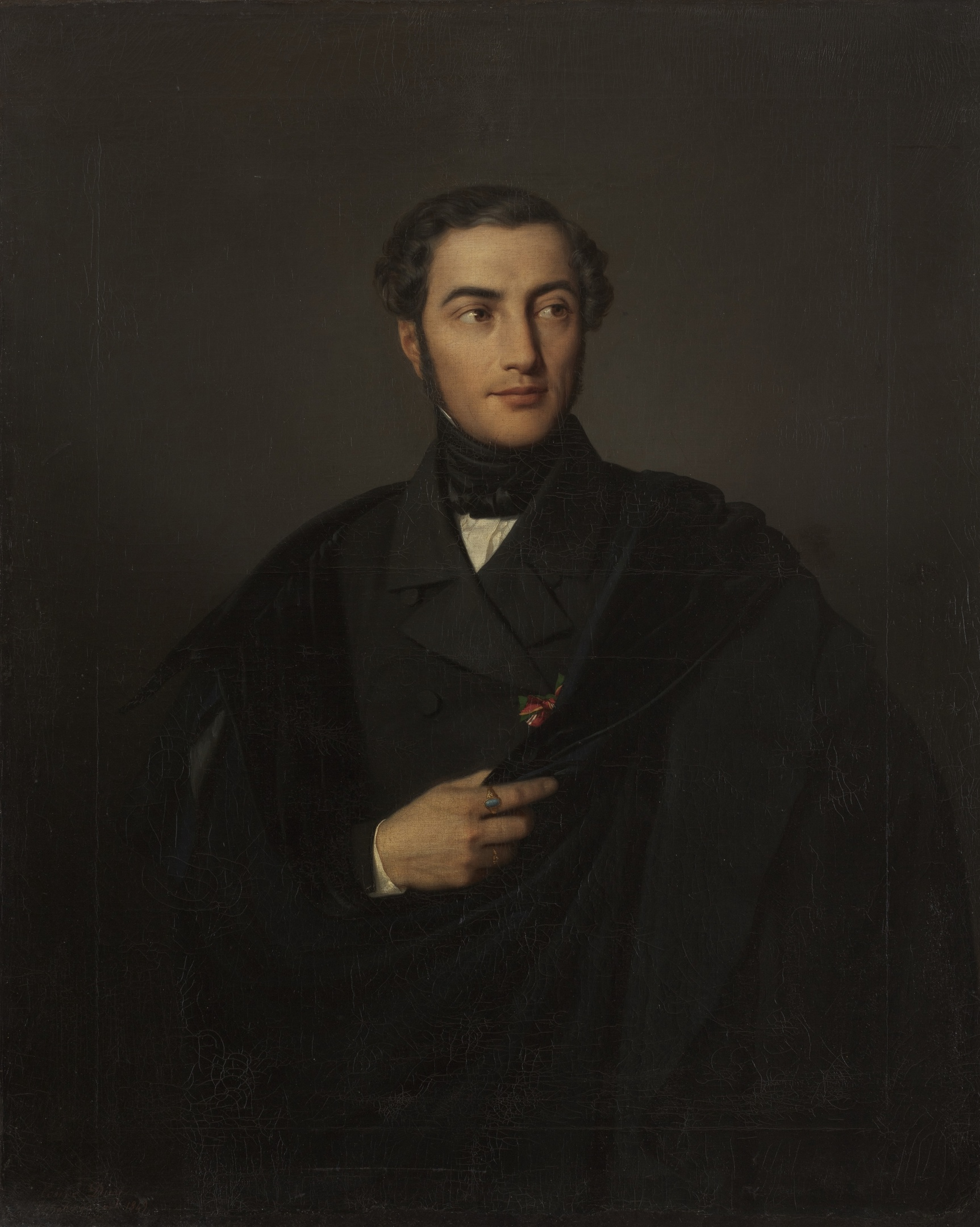
Alberto Cavos, 1849

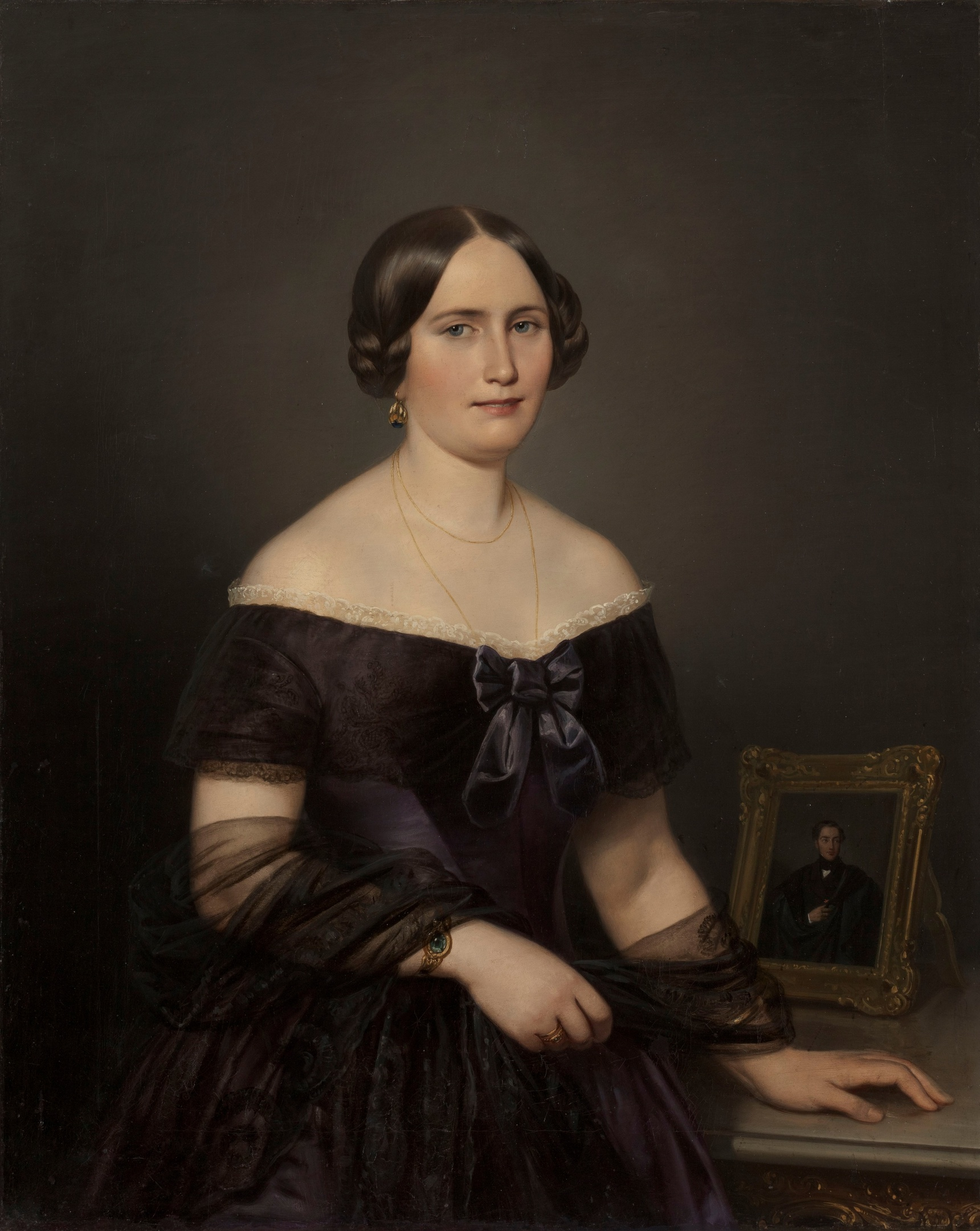
Ksenia Cavos, pendant to the previous, 1849

== Publications ==
- Dusi, Cosroe (2015). Kolesova, Nataliya V. (ed.). Дневник художника Козрое Дузи, или Приключения венецианца в России [Diario di Cosroe Dusi] (in Russian). St. Petersburg: Limbus Press. ISBN 978-5-8370-0658-6.
