= Olga Alexandrovna Orlova =

Russian numismatist and aristocrat

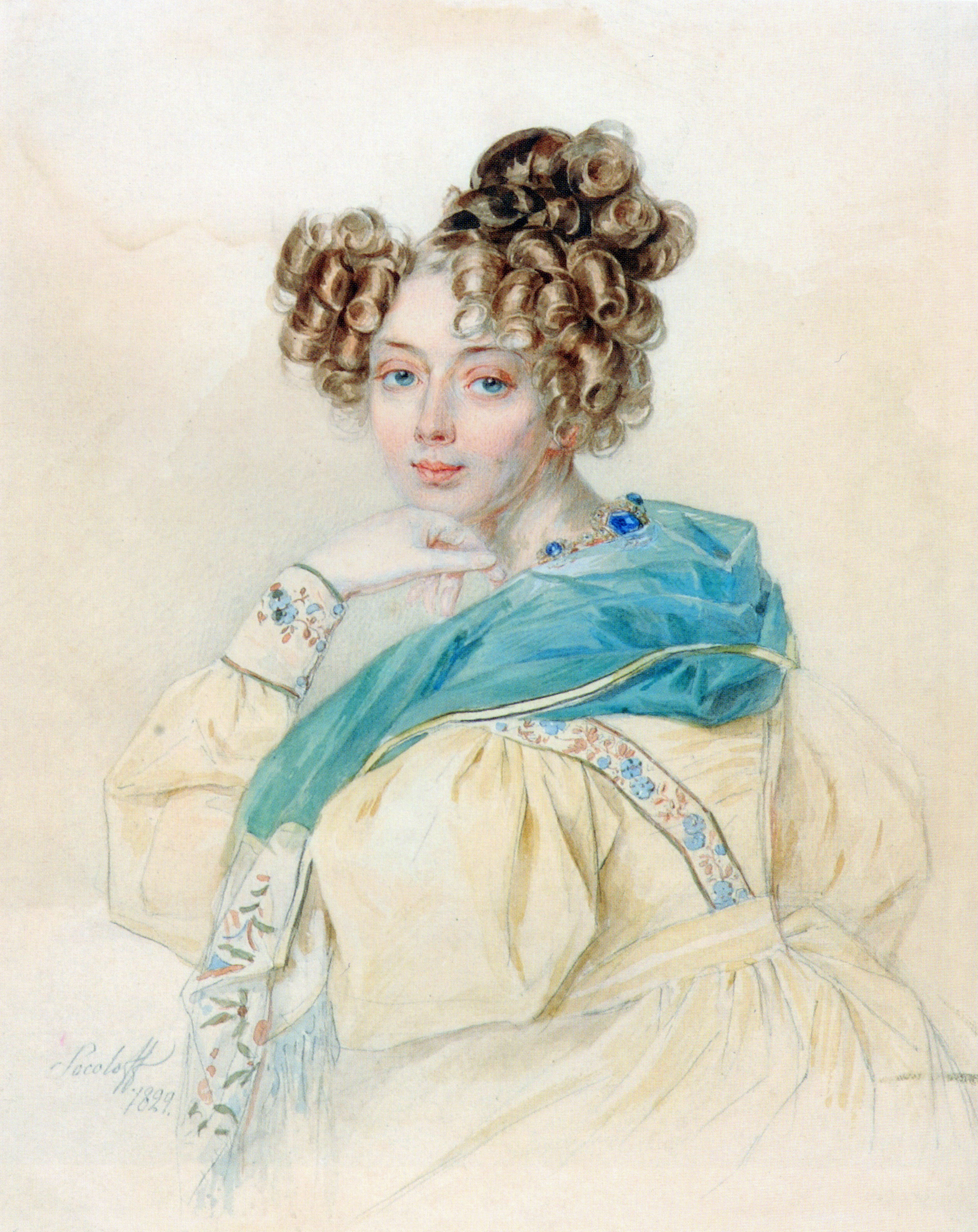
- Watercolor by P. F. Sokolov (1829)
- Born: Olga Alexandrovna Zherebtsova; 26 December 1806; Saint Petersburg, Russian Empire
- Died: 6 September [O.S. 25 August] 1880; Fontainebleau, France
- Noble family: Zherebtsov (by birth); Orlov (by marriage)
- Spouse: Alexey Fyodorovich Orlov
- Issue: Nikolay Alexeyevich Orlov
- Father: Alexander Alexandrovich Zherebtsov
- Mother: Alexandra Petrovna Lopukhina
- Occupation: Lady-in-waiting

Princess Olga Alexandrovna Orlova (née Zherebtsova; 26 December 1806, St. Petersburg, Russian Empire - 6 September [O.S. 25 August] 1880, Fontainebleau, France) - was a State Lady of the court. The wife of a prominent nobleman, Prince Alexi Orlov; mistress and organizer of Prince Orlov's Dacha in Strelna. She was known for her passion for numismatics.

== Early life ==
Olga was born the only child of chamberlain and prominent freemason Alexander Alexandrovich Zherebtsov (1781-1832) and his wife Alexandra Petrovna (nee Princess Lopukhina; 1788-1852) who was the younger sister of Anna Lopukhina, mistress of Paul I. She was the namesake of her grandmother Olga Zherebtsova. She was born in Saint Petersburg and baptised on 10 January 1807 in St. Isaac's Cathedral with her grandparents, A. A. Zherebtsov and E. N. Lopukhina, acting as her sponsors.

She was educated at home and spent a lot of time abroad with her mother in her childhood and adolescence, supposedly due to her poor health. They travelled around Italy and lived for a time in Florence with her mother's brother Pavel Petrovich Lopukhin. In the early 1820s, she was the engaged to the Duke of Montebello, and wore his portrait in a bracelet. The duke was short and plump, whereas Olga was tall and thin. Society circulated a pun about the couple "If the son of a donkey marries the daughter of a stallion, then I let you judge what the fruit will be." However, the wedding did not take place for unknown reasons.

== Married life ==
On 14 May 1826, she married Count Alexei Feodorovich Orlov (1786–1861), who was a close associate of Nicholas I. According to Vigel, Orlov had "insights, intelligence and ingenuity in his character, he had the face of Cupid and th figure of Apollo Belvedere." The wedding took place in Saint Petersburg in the Annunciation Church of the Horse Guards Regiment in the presence of the entire court. The grooms sponsors were V. V. Levashov and Prince N. Y. Golitsyn, the brides sponsors were her grand father, Prince P. V. Lopukhin and A. Benckendorff.

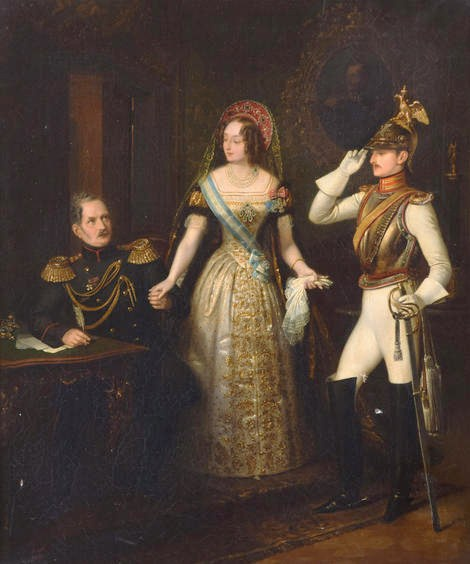
Countess Olga Alexandrovna in court dress with her husband and son by Cosroe Dusi (1845)

After the wedding, the Orlov's settled in the house of Princess Alexandra Petrovna Golitsyna. As dowry from her father, Olga Alexandrovna received the Zherebtsov family estate in the village of Kikino, Smolensk province, which contained about 1000 serfs. Despite the twenty year age gap between the spouses, their marriage was quite successful. Sharing the rank of her husband and his honours, Countess Orlova was given the honour of accompanying Empress Alexandra Feodorovna to her coronation in the summer of 1826. A year after the wedding, their son Nikolai (1827-1855) was born. A year later, their daughter Anna (1828-1829) who died infancy. They would have no more children. In February 1830 she was awarded the Order of Saint Catherine (lesser cross). In 1832, her father who had lived out his years in Kikino, died. Her mother, now a rich widow after her husband's death, married Count Adam Rzewuski who was thirteen years younger than herself. The relationship between Countess Orlova and her stepfather was cordial. He admired Olga, who was only six years younger than him, thus, felt some embarrassment in her presence.

In 1833, the Orlovs began construction of a country palace in the neo-gothic style in Strelna which cost them 450,000 roubles. Olga Alexandrovna observed the progress her self. In Strelna, she received the court and a select part of society. According to M. A. Korf, in subsequent years, while still young and in a good position, Orlova almost left society in order to devote herself to raising her only son, and preferred to leave a secluded life. The Emperor and Empress expressed a desire many times that young Nikolai Orlov be the playmate of the young Grand Dukes, but Olga Alexandrovna did not agree to this, and said that she did not consider it necessary to make either a lackey or a jester out of her son.

Countess Orlova was a patron of the Italian artist Cosroe Dusi, who came to Saint Petersburg in 1840. According to him, she was incredibly kind, worrying about orders and arranging patronage. In the same year, Olga Alexandrovna received the court title of state lady. In 1856, she, her husband, and her son were raised to the rank of prince.

== Later life ==
After the death of her husband in 181, Princess Orlova left for Italy, reportedly due to poor health. She settled in Florence, where she bought a palazzo with a large garden, which she decorated with modern comforts and luxury described as a 'royal atmosphere'.

She died of a stroke on her son's estate of Bellefontaine, Fontaineblueau, near Paris in 1880. She was buried in Samois-sur-Seine.

== Numismatistics ==
Coin collection was a rare hobby amongst contemporary Russian aristocrats. Her dedication to this hobby is evident in the will of G. I. Lisenko, a famous numismatist of the time, which listed Orlova as the first of three contenders for the purchase of his priceless collection, above Emperor Nicholas I himself and Count Sergei Stroganov who were also passionate collectors. Ultimately her husband, acting on her behalf, announced that she was refusing this deal. The fate of Olga Alexandrovna's own collection is unknown.
