= Alberto Cavos =

Russian architect (1800–1863)

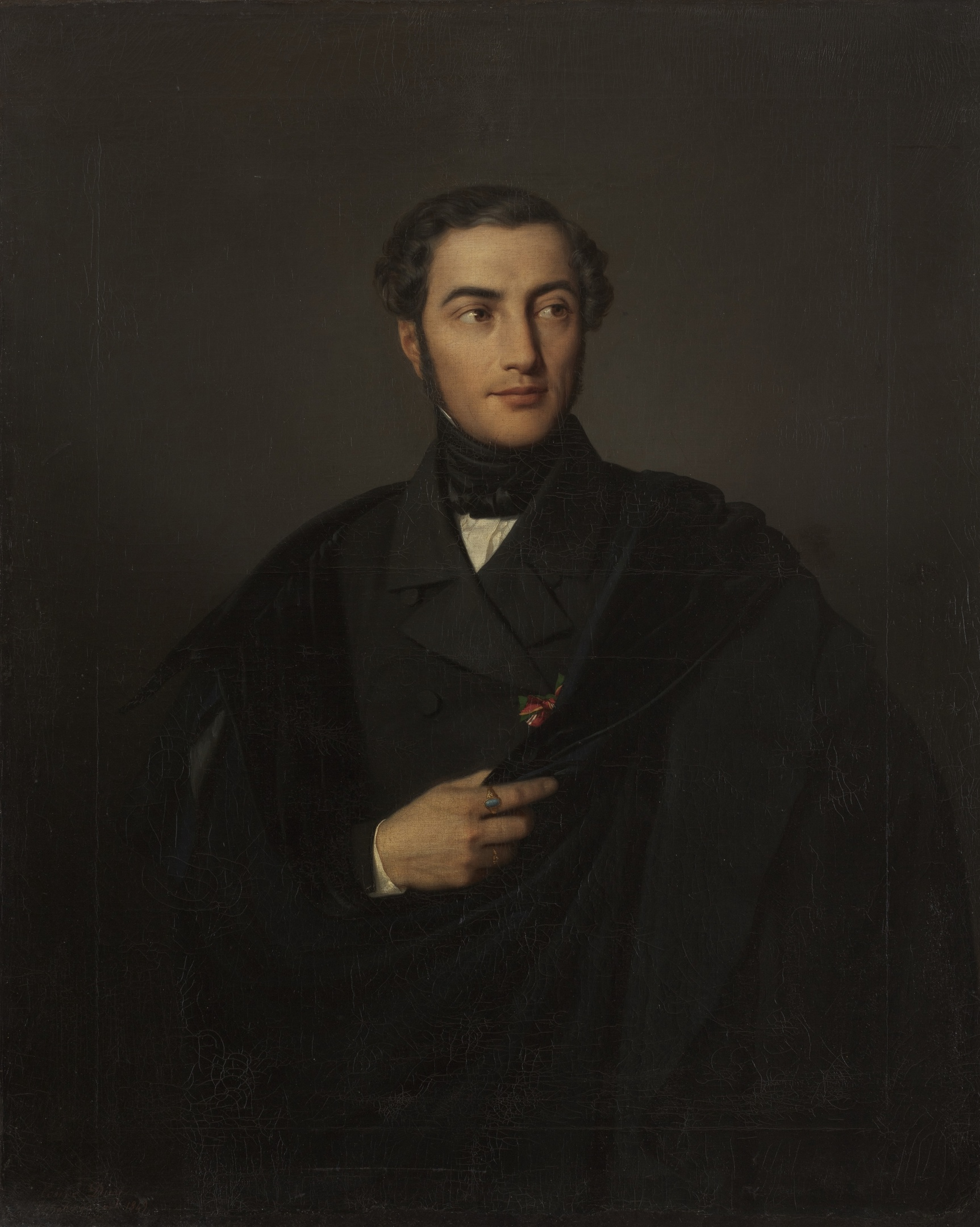
Cosroe Dusi, Alberto Cavos, 1849, oil on canvas; Hermitage Museum, Saint Petersburg

Alberto Katerinovich Cavos (Russian: Альбе́рт Катери́нович Ка́вос, romanized: Albert Katerinovich Kavos; January 3, 1801 [O.S. December 22, 1800] – 3 June [O.S. 22 May] 1863) was a Russian–Italian architect best known for his theatre designs, the builder of the Mariinsky Theatre in Saint Petersburg (1859–1860) and the Bolshoi Theatre in Moscow (1853–1856).

== Early years ==
Alberto Cavos was born in Saint Petersburg to Venetian opera composer Catterino Cavos (see Cavos family), and his wife, Camilla Baglioni, who had settled in Russia in 1798, after the fall of the Republic of Venice. Alberto Cavos was educated in the University of Padua and then returned to Russia to complete practical training in Carlo Rossi's workshop. His brother Giovanni (Ivan, 1805–1861) was trained in music and assisted his father in Saint Petersburg opera.

== Bolshoi Theatre (Saint Petersburg) ==
In 1826 Cavos received his first commission – rebuilding of the former Bolshoi Kamenny Theatre (the Stone Theatre). Built by Antonio Rinaldi in 1770, the theatre burnt down in 1811; restoration was interrupted by the death of its supervisor, Jean-François Thomas de Thomon, in 1813, and slowly dragged until 1818. Cavos dedicated ten years to this project; the theatre reopened as Saint Petersburg's main opera stage in 1836. However, the art of opera found little attention at the court; operas by Russian composers were banned in 1843 and in 1846 the Russian opera company migrated to Moscow's Bolshoi Theatre, built in the same period by Joseph Bové. Nevertheless, the theatre retained its Italian company and became a home stage for Marius Petipa ballet and operated until 1886, when it was rebuilt it into the Saint Petersburg Conservatory.

== Mariinsky Theatre (Saint Petersburg) ==
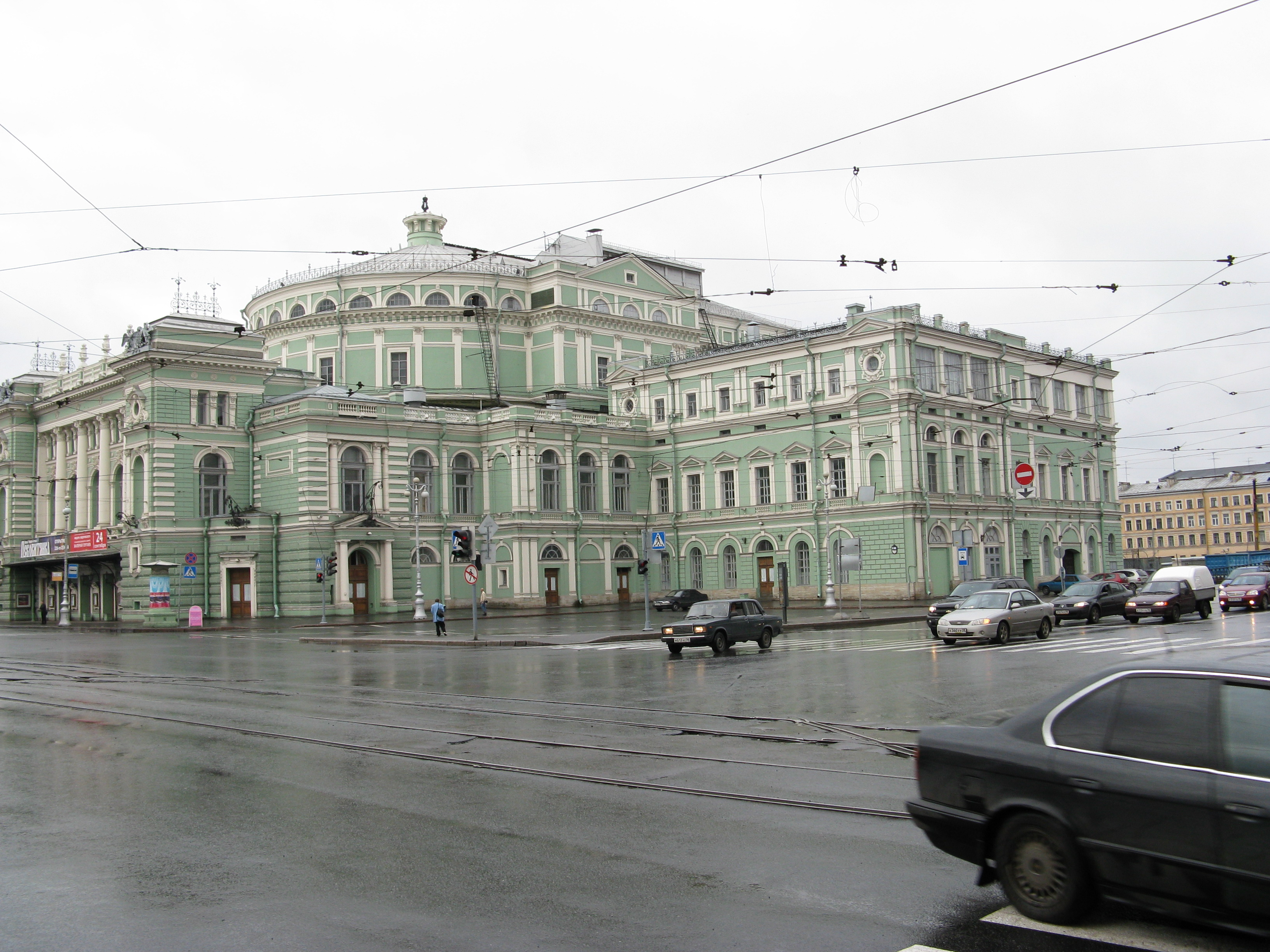
Mariinsky Theatre.

In 1847–1848 Cavos designed and built a wooden Equestrian Circus Theatre in Saint Petersburg, on a square now known as Theatre Square. The Circus opened on January 20, 1849, and soon became a home stage for the Russian opera company that returned from Moscow in 1850. Nine years later, on January 26, 1859, the Circus burnt down; Alexander II ordered Cavos to rebuild the theatre "with all the improvements that had been needed to be made when the circus building was turned into a theatre.The Czar further orders that the Architect preserve the interior decoration as it used to be". Cavos retained the Romanesque facade of the Circus, but completely redesigned the interiors, replacing the old circular arena with a horseshoe-shapes "Italian" opera hall. The new theatre opened in October 1860 as Imperial Mariinsky Theatre, named after Empress Maria Alexandrovna, and immediately became Saint Petersburg's principal opera stage.

== Bolshoi Theatre (Moscow) ==
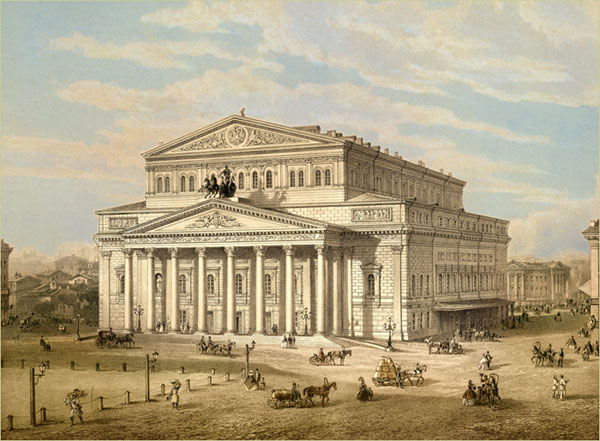
Bolshoi Theatre in Cavos times

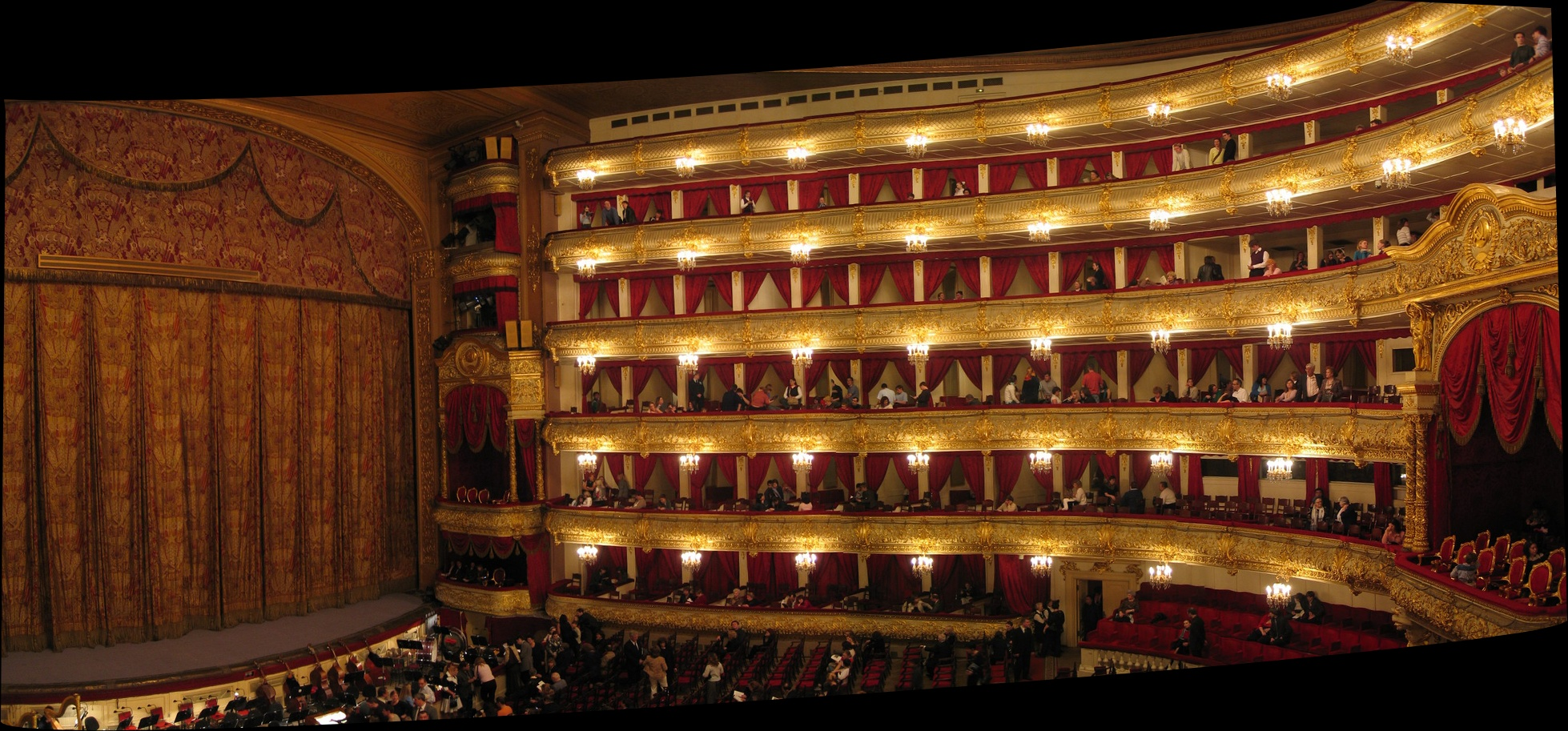
Main hall of Bolshoi Theatre in Moscow

On March 11, 1853, Bolshoi Theatre in Moscow was destroyed by fire that left only exterior wall standing. Cavos secured the contract to rebuild the theatre and substantially expanded and altered Bove's original plan, creating Bolshoi as it was known before closing down for restoration in 2005. Despite the economic downturn that accompanied the disastrous Crimean War, the work rushed through, especially after the death of Tsar Nicholas I – according to Alexander Benois, to reopen the theatre in time for his successor's coronation. Bolshoi indeed reopened in the presence of Alexander II of Russia on August 20, 1856, featuring a new grand hall for 2,150 spectators. In line with the eclecticism of the period, Cavos described his work as "making the auditorium as magnificent as possible and to produce a light effect, if possible, in the Renaissance style in combination with the Byzantine style. White colour, the bright crimson drapings, overstrewn with golden interior decoration of the boxes, different on each storey, the plaster arabesques and the main effect of the auditorium – its grand chandelier...". Cavos retained a personal "architect's box" at the Bolshoi, which later passed to his descendants from the Benois family.

Henry Sutherland Edwards, contemporary British journalist, praised Cavos as being "not only an architect, but also an acoustician, if we may use the term ... he understands what does not appear to be understood in London...". According to Edwards, Cavos ridiculed the idea that acoustical properties of a building cannot be ensured by design; he deliberately designed, built and outfitted his theatres for sound. "It (the Bolshoi) is constructed as a musical instrument", commented Cavos.

Modern architects add a sober note: despite excellent acoustics, the Bolshoi suffered from poor build quality and poor planning of its public areas. The former may be in part blamed on local contractors, 16-month rush schedule and a modest budget of 900,000 roubles. Ivan Rerberg, who restored Bolshoi in 1920–1932, bitterly commented on the architect's decision to close and fill with earth the original groundfloor galleries that housed cloakrooms before the 1853 fire. Large spans of load-bearing brick walls were laid without mortar; weak foundations underneath, placed in the bend of subterranean Neglinnaya River, were shifting erratically since 19th century. By the end of the 20th century, salvaging Bolshoi required a complete replacement of foundations.

== Private life and legacy ==
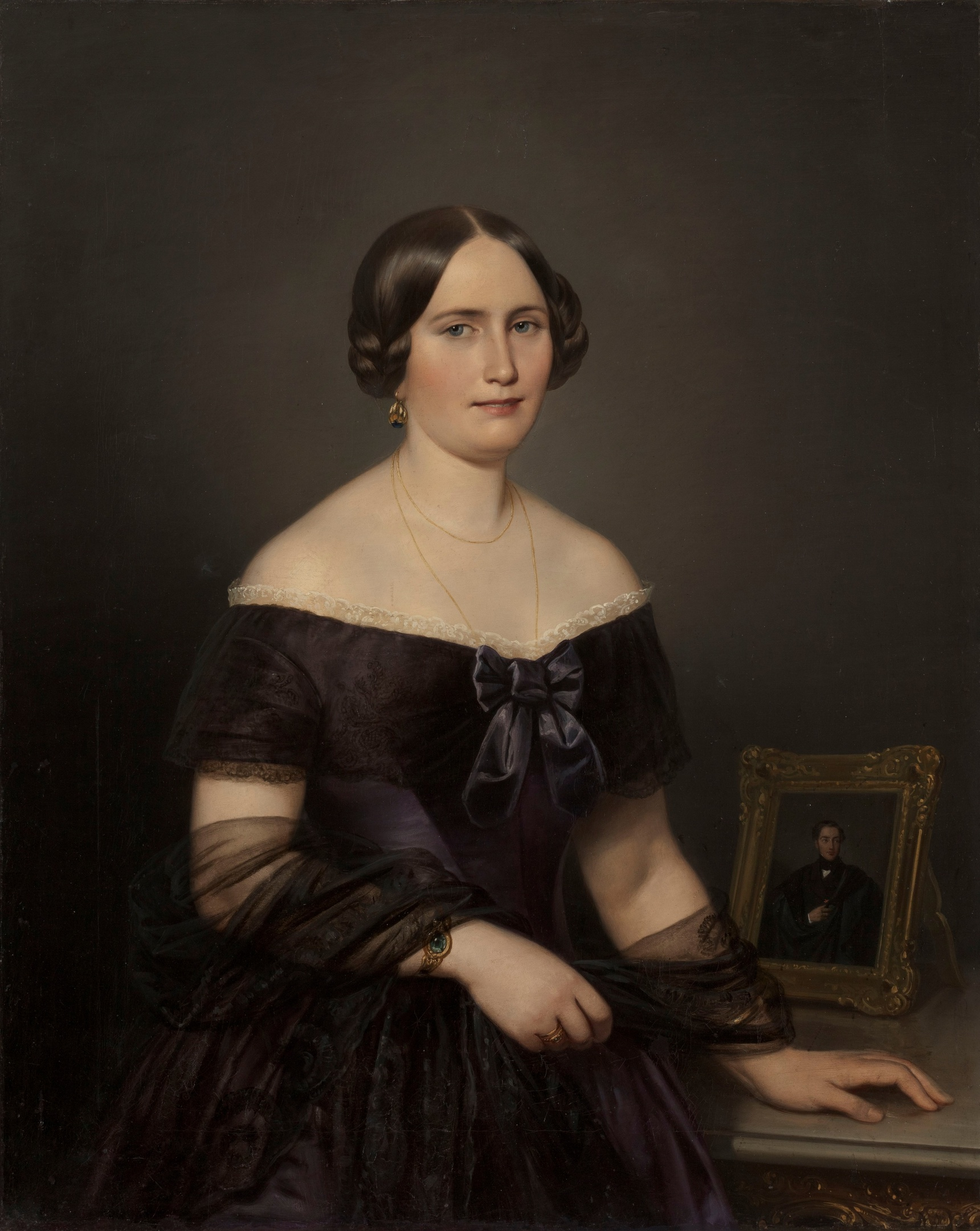
Cosroe Dusi, Ksenia Cavos, 1849, oil on canvas; Hermitage Museum, Saint Petersburg

In 1859 Cavos completed the rebuilding of Mikhaylovsky Theatre in Saint Petersburg. The architect's last work was a competition entry for the design of the Paris opera; according to Alexander Benois, his drafts were approved by Napoleon III of France but when Cavos died, at Peterhof, the job was awarded to Charles Garnier. Apart from theatres, Cavos is credited with design of dozens of buildings in Saint Petersburg and its suburbs. Most of these buildings were subsequently expanded and rebuilt, losing their original architectural trim.

The private life of Alberto Cavos and his family has been made public by his grandson, Alexander Benois. According to Benois, Cavos was overwhelmed by lucrative contracts and quickly made a fortune that allowed him, in addition to Saint Petersburg lifestyle, to keep a luxurious home on the Grand Canal in Venice and amass a vast collection of art there. After his death these treasures were brought to Saint Petersburg and split between his numerous heirs.

Alberto's first wife, Aloysia Carolina (née Carobio), died of tuberculosis in 1835. She and Alberto had four children. Alberto Cavos married Xenia, his second wife, when she was only 17; they had three children. However, his extramarital adventures destroyed the marriage; in the end, Alberto Cavos bequeathed his business interests to his new mistress, having nearly ruined his legitimate wife and children. Among these children,

- Caesar Cavos (1824–1883) also became a notable Saint Petersburg architect and businessman;
- Constantin Cavos (1826–1890) was a diplomat in Imperial Russian service;
- Camilla Cavos (1828–1891) married Nicholas Benois (then a junior partner of Alberto Cavos) and gave birth to nine siblings of the Benois family, including Albert Benois (1852–1936), Leon Benois (1856–1928), Alexander Benois (1870–1960) and Yekaterina Benois who married Eugene Lanceray (Sr.) and became the mother of Eugene Lanceray and Zinaida Serebriakova. Sir Peter Ustinov was Leon Benois's grandson.

== Sources ==
- "Кавос, Каттерино" . Brockhaus and Efron Encyclopedic Dictionary (in Russian). 1906.
- Benois, Alexander (1989). Жизнь художника (in Russian). Moscow: Nauka. ISBN 5-02-012722-1.
- Bereson, Ruth (2002). The Operatic State: Cultural Policy and the Opera House. Routledge. ISBN 0-415-27851-1.
- Edwards, Henry Sutherland (1861). The Russians at Home. London: W.H. Allen and Co.
- Fitzlyon, Kiryl; et al. (2003). The Companion Guide to St Petersburg. Companion Guides. ISBN 1-900639-40-8.
- Melnikova, Irina (2006). "Bolshoy kush" (in Russian). Itogi, January 16, 2006, No. 3 (501).
- Taruskin, Richard (1996). Stravinsky and the Russian traditions: a biography of the works through Mavra. Oxford University Press. ISBN 0-19-816250-2.
- Wachtel, Andrew (1998). Petrushka: Sources and Contexts. Northwestern University Press. ISBN 0-8101-1566-2.
- Zherikhina, Yelena I. (2008). "Альберто и Цезарь Кавос в Петербурге". In Frolov, Vladimir A. (ed.). Леонтий Бенуа и его время (conference papers) (in Russian). St. Petersburg: Russian Institute for History of Arts. pp. 350–363. ISBN 978-5-86845-134-8.
