= Catterino Cavos =

Italian composer (1775–1840)

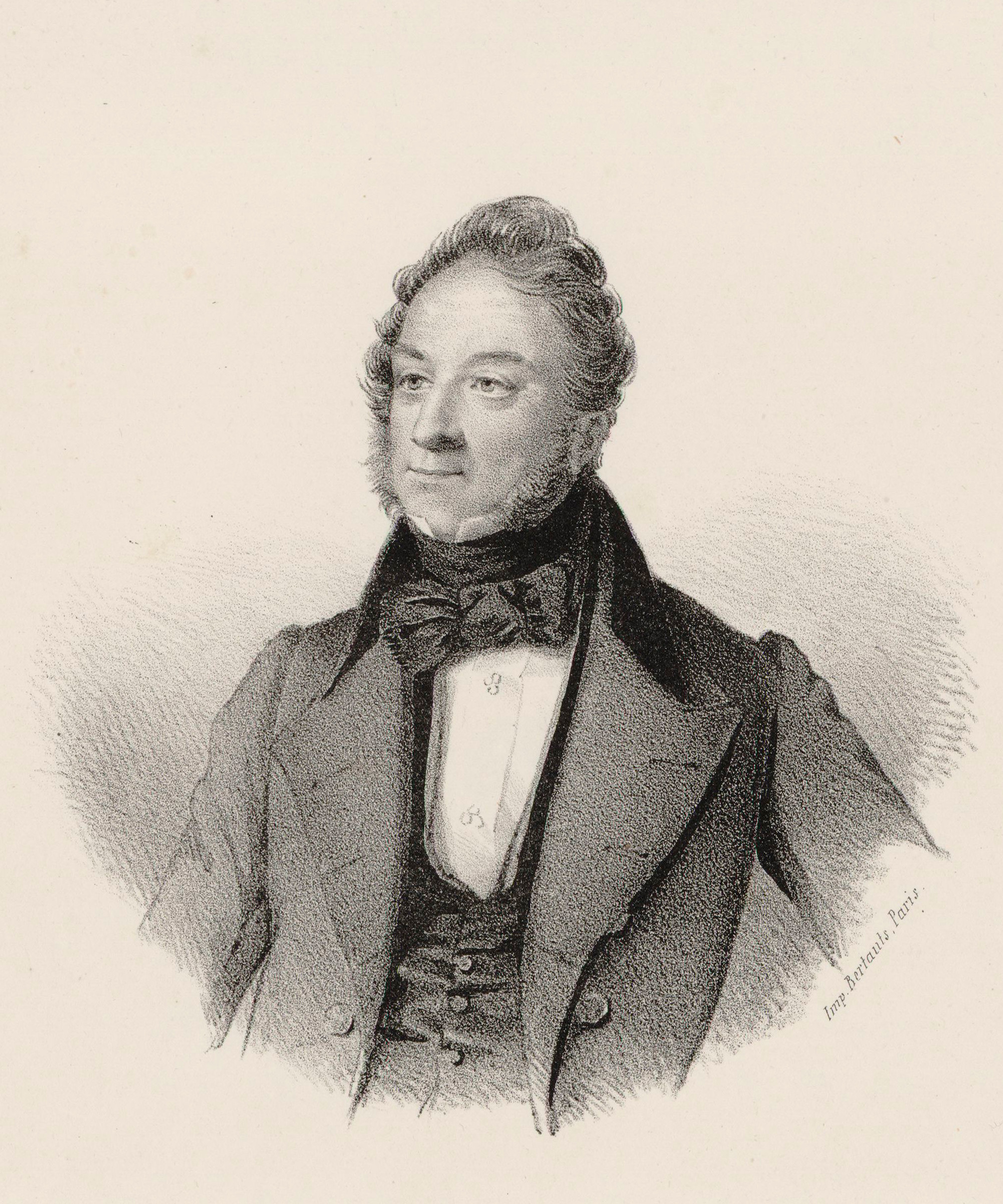
Portrait, 1820

Catterino Albertovich Cavos (Italian: Salvador Cattarin Cavos; Russian: Катерино Альбертович Кавос, romanized: Katerino Albertovich Kavos; October 21, 1777 – 10 May [O.S. 28 April] 1840) was an Italian composer, organist and conductor who settled in Russia. He played an important role in the history of Russian opera and was the father of Alberto Cavos.

Cavos is celebrated in Russian musical history as the man who composed the opera Ivan Susanin in 1815, 20 years before Mikhail Glinka's opera of the same name. The plot, based on an episode from Russian history, tells the story of the Russian peasant and patriotic hero Ivan Susanin who sacrifices his life for the Tsar by leading astray a group of marauding Poles who were hunting him.

== Early years and family ==
Cavos was born in Venice, Italy, on October 21, 1777. His father, Alberto Filippo Cavos (also known as Cavosi), was the Primo Ballerino Assoluto (lead male ballet dancer) and director of the La Fenice theatre in Venice.

Cavos studied under Francesco Bianchi. At the age of twelve, Cavos composed a cantata to celebrate Leopold II's arrival in Venice. At fourteen he was offered the post of organist to St Mark's Basilica, but refused the position, allowing the post to be given to an older, impoverished musician.

== Russian years ==
In his early twenties, Cavos accepted a position as conductor of the Italian operatic company Astariti, and traveled with the company to St. Petersburg in 1797. The company was soon disbanded, but Cavos had fallen in love with St. Petersburg, and entered the service of the Imperial Theatres, at first as composer for a French opera troupe with the responsibility to write music for the opera-vaudevilles. In 1803, Emperor Alexander I appointed Cavos as Kapellmeister of Italian and Russian opera, placing him in charge of the Bolshoi Kamenny Theatre. He also served as a professor at the Saint Catherine School, and later occupied the same place in the Smolny Convent.

He began composing his own operas in 1805. These included: Knyaz-nevidimka (The Invisible Prince) (1805), Ilya Bogatyr (Ilya the Hero) (1807), Zephyre et Flore (1808), Ivan Susanin (1815), and The Firebird (1822). He also contributed to the second part of the opera tetralogy Rusalka (1803–1807). The Cossack as Poet, a one-act vaudeville (1812), remained in the repertory until 1852.

John Warrack wrote of Cavos' work:

Cavos's operas draw on Russian subjects. Ilya Bogatyr, for which the fabulist Ivan Krylov wrote the libretto, is a Romantic magic opera continuing the line of Catherine's Fevey text and anticipating Glinka's Ruslan and Lyudmila. A few, such as The Firebird (1822), treat the Oriental themes that had become fashionable with Russia's expansion, and thus also anticipate Ruslan and Lyudmila and Borodin's Prince Igor. Cavos's main librettist, however, was Alexander Shakhovskoy, Director of the Imperial Theatres. Shakhovskoy's text for The Cossack Poet (1812) invokes the patriotic sentiments of the times, and so, even more, does his text for Ivan Susanin (1815), a "rescue opera" owing much to French example. When Glinka's own opera about Ivan Susanin...was produced in 1836, it was Cavos who conducted; but though Cavos generously declared that his work was now superseded, it [Ivan Susanin] continued in the repertoire until 1854.

Cavos' opera Ivan Susanin is regarded as the first Russian opera: the plot is based on real Russian historical fact, he included in the music the Russian folk melodies, for the first time a Russian peasant became the main character on the Opera stage - not a mythical character, not a tsar or a commander. For the first time an attempt was made to enter the theatre of the opera stage of the specific features of Russian life.

However, in Russian musical literature, the analysis of this opera are devoted to only two articles (up to the present time) - of Abram Gozenpud and of Viktor Korshikov.

Russian music critic Abram Gozenpud (1908 - 2004) considered that this opera was unsuccessful because it is not shown in the main: the feat of the hero. Real Ivan Susanin died from enemies, and the opera was a happy end (author of libretto is Alexander Shakhovskoy, ru: Александр Александрович Шаховской).

Viktor Korshikov (Vitaly Peskov’s stepson) is full of sarcasm: "Shakhovskoy changed the finale: his Susanin did not die the death of a hero and wandered with the Polish detachment through the woods from tree to tree in different parts of the scene and waited for a Russian detachment to come, kill Poles, and free him. Susanin of Shakhovskoy himself explains his feat along the way to fellow villagers : „I will go with the guests, and you call Russian soldiers, they will come, will kill all the enemies and they'll take me home". And Susanin was walking with very friendly polite enemies across the expanses of the scene. Of course, such a naive interpretation of images and heroes and enemies could not satisfy the sense of Patriotic consciousness, it did not reach the expected tragic pathos. Therefore, a new musical creation on the same topic was required"

But both critics celebrate the musical successes of the opera, especially in the chorus melodies. Viktor Korshikov writes: "The choral song of peasants is beginning to Russian choral style, which was subsequently used Glinka, Rimsky-Korsakov, and Borodin and reached its zenith in the works of Mussorgsky. In this snippet, introduced principles of folk supporting voices, bass, which before were considered ornament for choir, led the main melody. This is a unique case for the beginning of the 19th century".

The work in question, based on the tale of Ivan Susanin, was Glinka's epoch-making A Life for the Tsar. (another name for this Glinka's opera is Ivan Susanin, too).

Mikhail Glinka took his creation A Life for the Tsar in the Petersburg Imperial theatre, in which the Department of opera was headed by Cavos. Cavos immediately adopted a new opera. Moreover, Cavos himself conducted the orchestra at the premiere of the opera A Life for the Tsar December 9 (November 27) 1836.

Both opera with one plot – of Cavos and of Glinka – were included in the repertoire of the Bolshoi Kamenny theater in St. Petersburg for many years simultaneously. Singer Osip Petrov (a pupil of Catterino Cavos) sang the role of Ivan Susanin in both operas (the first singer of Ivan Susanin in the Cavos opera was a pupil of Catterino Cavos Piotr Zlov).

Cavos acquainted the Russian public with the operas of Luigi Cherubini, Étienne Méhul, Carl Maria von Weber, and others.

Cavos spent more than forty years in Russia and died in St Petersburg.

== Professional legacy and descendants ==
Orlando Figes says of him:

In 1803 the Emperor Alexander took control of the public theatres and placed Cavos in charge of the Bolshoi Kamenny, until then the only public opera house and exclusively reserved for Italian opera. Cavos built the Bolshoi Kamenny into a stronghold of Russian opera. He wrote works such as Ilya Bogatyr (1807) on heroic national themes with librettos in Russian, and his music was strongly influenced by Russian and Ukrainian folk songs. Much of Glinka's operatic music, which the nationalists would champion as the foundation of the Russian tradition, was in fact anticipated by Cavos. The 'national character' of Russian music was thus first developed by a foreigner.

Cavos' wife, Camilla Baglioni (1773–1832), was a coloratura soprano who gained fame as an opera singer in the late 18th century. Opera was in Camilla's blood; three of her sisters and two of her brothers also had careers as opera singers.

Arguably, the most successful member of the Baglioni family was Camilla's brother, Antonio Baglioni. Antonio served for nearly a decade (1787-1795/6) as the leading tenor in Domenico Guardasoni's opera troupe. In 1787, Antonio created the role of Don Ottavio in Don Giovanni in a performance personally conducted by the opera's composer, Wolfgang Amadeus Mozart. Four years later, Antonio created the role of Tito in another opera composed and conducted by Mozart, La clemenza di Tito. This was a great honor, as only a handful of singers had multiple operatic roles written expressly for them by Mozart.

Cavos and Camilla's eldest son, Albert Catterinovich "Alberto" Cavos (1800–1863), was an architect best known for his theatre designs, having built Russia's two most iconic theatres, the Mariinsky Theatre in St. Petersburg (1859–1860) and the Bolshoi Theatre in Moscow (1853–1856). Albert's daughter Camilla married Nicholas Benois, a prominent Russian architect, and became the matriarch of the Benois family. Her descendants included: Alexandre Benois artist and founder of Mir iskusstva, painter Zinaida Serebriakova, sculptor and graphic artist Eugene Lanceray, architect Leon Benois, and actor Sir Peter Ustinov.

Cavos and Camilla's younger son, Ivan Catterinovich "Giovanni" Cavos (1805–1861), received musical training and served thirty years in the Imperial Theatres in St. Petersburg, holding various positions, including Director of Orchestras, Director of Italian Opera, and Inspector of the Smolny Institute.

Cavos' daughter, Stefanida, taught music at the Smolny Institute from 1822 to 1837, before marrying an Italian named Tommaso Coronini, and settling in Venice.

== Operas ==
- Soliman second, ou Les trois Sultanes one-act vaudeville after Charles Simon Favart, June 7 [OS Mai 26] 1798 St. Petersburg. (Also with Russian libretto: Suliman vtoroi, ili Tri sultanshi – Сулиман второй или три султанши, 1813)
- Les Trois bossus (Three Brothers Crouchbacks)
- L'Alchimiste
- L'Intrigue dans les ruines
- Le Mariage d'Aubigny
- Lesta, dneprovskaya rusalka (May 17 [OS May 5], 1804, St Petersburg, Bolshoi Kamenny Theatre) by Ferdinand Kauer with the additional music by Cavos and Stepan Davydov.
- Knyaz nevidimka, ili Licharda volshebnik (Князь-невидимка – The Invisible Prince, libretto by Lifanov, in 4 acts May 17, 1805 St Petersburg)
- Lyobovnaya pochta (Любовная почта – The Mail of Love, libretto by Alexander Shakhovskoy 1806)
- Ilya Bogatyr (Илья-Богатырь – Ilya the Hero, libretto by Ivan Krylov, January 12, 1807 St Petersburg)
- Tri brata gorbuna (Три брата-горбуна – Three Brothers Crouchbacks, 1808) [revision of Les trois bossus]
- Kazak-stikhotvorets (Казак-стихотворец – The Cossack as Poet, May 27, 1812, St Petersburg)
- Ivan Susanin (Иван Сусанин, libretto by Alexander Shakhovskoy, October 30 [OS October 19], 1815 St Petersburg)
- Dobrynya Nikitich (Добрыня Никитич, 1818) [together with F. Antonolini]
- Zhar-ptitsa (Жар птица – The Firebird, 1823)

== Ballets ==
- Flore et Zéphire (1808)
- Don Quixote, choreographer Charles Didelot (1808)
- Cupid and Psyche, choreographer Charles-Louis Didelot (1809)
- Militia, or Love for the Fatherland, choreographers Ivan Valberkh and Auguste Poireau (ru: «Ополчение, или Любовь к отечеству» // Opolchenie ili lyubov' k Otechestvu) (1812 or 1813)
- The triumph of Russia, or the Russians in Paris, choreographers Ivan Valberkh and Auguste Poireau (ru: «Торжество России, или Русские в Париже») (1814)
- Acis et Galatée (ru: «Ацис и Галатея»), choreographer Charles Didelot (1816)
- Carlos and Rozalba (ru: «Карлос и Розальба»), choreographer Charles Didelot (1817)
- Young peasant woman, or Leon and Tamaida (ru: «Молодая крестьянка, или Леон и Тамаида»), choreographer Charles Didelot (1818)
- Laura and Heinrich, or the Troubadour (ru: «Лаура и Генрих, или Трубадур»), choreographer Charles Didelot (1819)
- Raul de Kreki, choreographer Charles Didelot (1819)
- Prisoner of the Caucasus, or the Shadow of the bride (ru: Кавказский пленник, или Тень невесты // Kavkazsky plennik ili ten' nevesty), choreographer Charles Didelot (1822)
- Le Diable à quatre ou la Double Métamorphose (ru: «Сатана со всем прибором, или Урок чародея») (1825)
- Sumbek, or the Conquest of the Kazan Kingdom (ru: Сумбека, или Покорение Казанского царства) (1830). In connection with the dismissal of Charles Didelot for staging by another choreographer Alexis-Scipion Blache a composer Hippolyte Sonnet (Sonneu, Sonneux ?) composed his music.

== In popular culture ==
An arietta from Cavos' vaudeville "Cossack-Poet" became a folk song, and its melody survives as Yes, My Darling Daughter by Jack Lawrence.

== CDs ==
- The Golden Age of Russian Guitar, Vol.2CD: Ovchinnikov, Oleg Timofeyev, D. Kushenov-Dmitrievsky, Andrei Osipovich Sychra, Catterino Cavos
