= Nikolay Alexeyevich Orlov =

Russian nobleman, soldier, social reformer and diplomat

Prince Nikolay Orlov
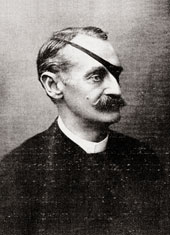
- Born: Count Nikolay Alekseyevich Orlov; 27 April 1827; Saint Petersburg, Russian Empire
- Died: 17 March 1885 (aged 57); Fontainebleau , France
- Noble family: Orlov
- Spouse: Princess Ekaterina Nikolaevna Trubetskaya
- Issue: Alexey Nikolaevich; Vladimir Nokolaevich; Anna Nikolaevna
- Father: Count Alexey Fyodorovich Orlov
- Mother: Olga Alexandrovna Zherebtsova

Prince Nikolay Alekseyevich Orlov (Russian: Никола́й Алексе́евич Орло́в; April 27, 1827 — March 17, 1885) was a Russian nobleman, soldier, social reformer, diplomat, and writer. He started his career as an officer in the Russian army, and later served variously as the Russian ambassador to Belgium, Great Britain, France, the Austro-Hungarian Empire, and Germany. He was primarily responsible for the end of corporal punishment under Russian law.

Orlov was born in St. Petersburg to Prince, then Count, Alexey Fyodorovich Orlov and his wife Olga Alexandrovna (nee Zherebtsova). He studied law, and in 1843, he became a page at the Russian Imperial Court. In 1845, he was assigned to the Life Guard Horse Regiment. In 1846, he was attached to the staff of Grand Duke Konstantin Nikolayevich, the Tzar's son. In 1849, he distinguished himself in the suppression of the 1848 Hungarian uprising, and was promoted to captain. From 1851 to 1854 he served on the General Staff and in the War Ministry. Promoted to colonel, he was sent to the Army of the Danube under Field Marshal Paskevich, where against the Turks at the siege of Silistria he led the charge that took the fortress, was mentioned in dispatches as showing exception bravery, and was awarded the Order of St. George; but his severe wounds, he lost an eye and an arm, put him on medical leave and he spent sixteen months convalescing in Italy. It was there that he wrote his Очерк 3-недельного похода Наполеона I против Пруссии в 1806 году [Sketch of the 3-week campaign of Napoleon I against Prussia in 1806]. On his return, in August 1856, he was promoted to major general. Beginning in 1858, he began to publish works on social reform, promoting religious tolerance and civility. In 1861 he presented the Tzar with his "On the abolition of corporal punishment in Russia and in the Kingdom of Poland" which subsequently resulted in the decree of 17 April 1863, substantially eliminating it.

He was appointed the Ambassador of Russia to Belgium on 3 July 3, 1859 and served there until 13 December 1869. From then until 2 May 1870 he was the Ambassador of Russia to Austria. In May 1870 he was transferred to the same position in Great Britain and on 14 December 1871 to France. From then until 1880 he was ambassador to France, and in 1884 he became the ambassador to Germany. Due to failing health he moved to Samois-sur-Seine, near Fontainebleau, where he died on 29 March 1885.
