= Giovan Francesco Locatelli =

Italian painter

Giovan Francesco Locatelli (1810–1882) was an Italian painter, mainly of genre subjects.

== Biography ==
Among his works are: La carità al povero cieco; Un mendicante; Un concerto musicale; Suonatore girovago; Vecchio pezzente; and Musica in famiglia. The father of the 17th-18th century painter Andrea Locatelli was also a painter named Giovanni Francesco. One of his works highlights class conflicts, such as The Rich and the Poor. Another of his works, Three Venetian Girls, is owned by the Tewksbury public library in Massachusetts. His painting of Flora is in the Museo Civico of Padua.
