= Alexey Fyodorovich Orlov =

Russian diplomat

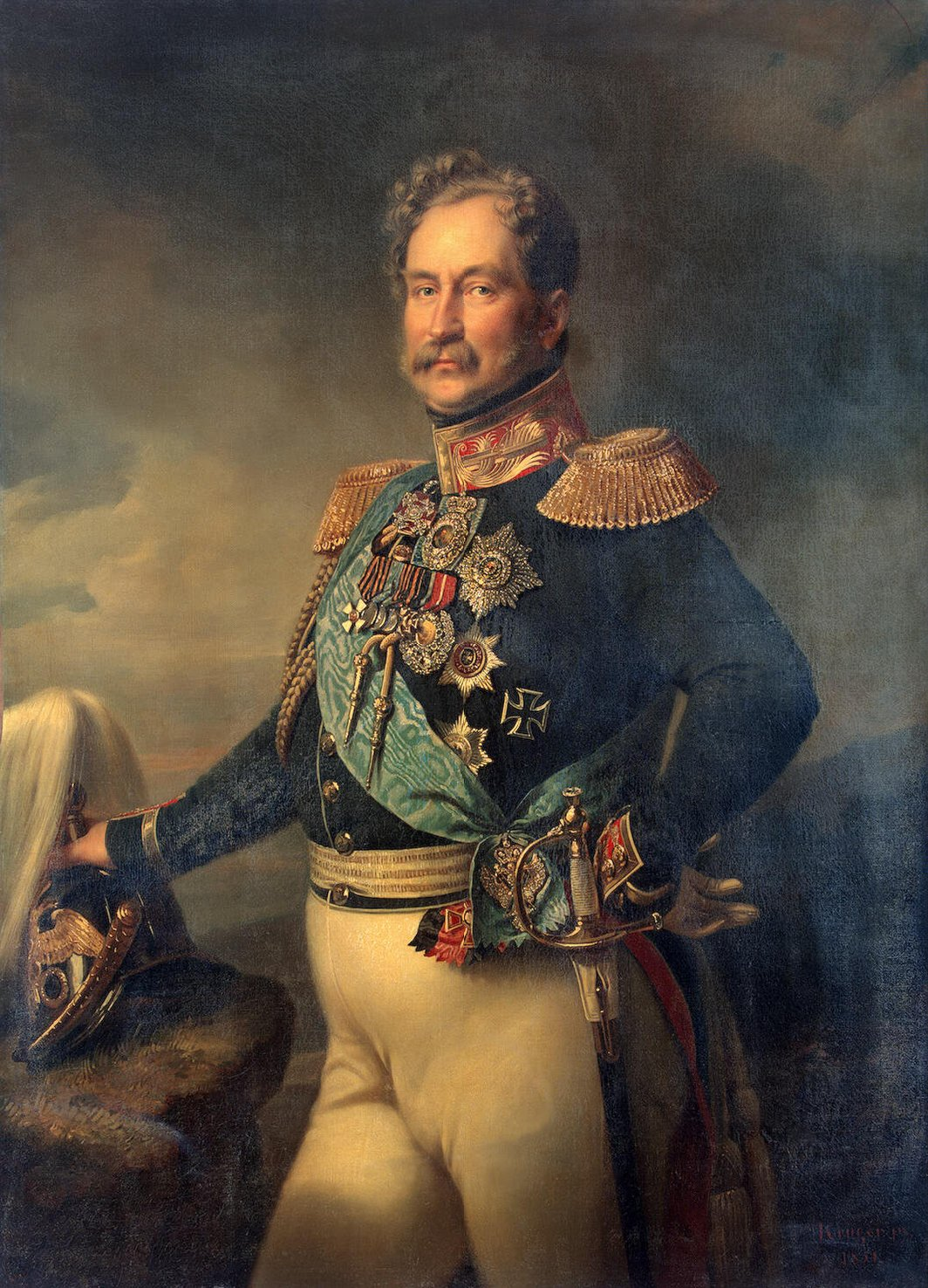
- Portrait by Franz Krüger (1851), Hermitage
- Born: Алексей Фёдорович Орлов; 30 October 1787; Moscow, Russian Empire
- Died: 2 June 1862 (aged 74); Saint Petersburg, Russian Empire
- Buried: Annunciation Church of the Life Guard Horse Regiment, St. Petersburg
- Noble family: Orlov
- Spouse: Olga Alexandrovna Orlova
- Issue: Nikolay Alexeyevich Orlov; Anna Alexeevna Orlova
- Father: Fyodor Grigoryevich Orlov
- Mother: Elizaveta Mikhailovna Gusyatnikova

State Council
- In office 1836 (member)/1856 (chairman) – 1861
- Monarch: Nicholas I
- Preceded by: Alexander Chernyshyov (as chairman)
- Succeeded by: Dmitry Bludov (as chairman)

Chairman of the Committee of Ministers
- In office 1856–1861
- Monarchs: Nicholas I Alexander II
- Preceded by: Alexander Chernyshyov
- Succeeded by: Dmitry Bludov

Senior Chief of the Third Section of His Imperial Majesty's Own Chancellery
- In office 1844–1856
- Monarchs: Nicholas I Alexander II
- Preceded by: Alexander von Benckendorff
- Succeeded by: Vasily Dolgorukov

Russian Ambasador to Constantinople (1833)

Prince Alexey Fyodorovich Orlov (Russian: Алексей Фёдорович Орлов; 30 October [O.S. 19 October] 1787 – 2 June [O.S. 21 May] 1862) was a Russian diplomat, the natural son of Count Fyodor Grigoryevich Orlov. Born in Moscow, he took part in the Napoleonic Wars from 1805 to the capture of Paris in 1814. For his services as commander of the cavalry regiment of the Horse Life Guards during the rebellion of 1825 he was granted the title of count, and in the Turkish War of 1828–1829 he rose to the rank of lieutenant-general.

At this time his diplomatic career began. He served as the Russian plenipotentiary at the Peace of Adrianople, and in 1833 was appointed Russian ambassador at Constantinople, holding at the same time the post of commander-in-chief of the Black Sea Fleet. In 1836 he became member of the Imperial Council of State. He became, indeed, one of the most trusted agents of Emperor Nicholas I, whom in 1837 he accompanied on his foreign tour. From 1844 to 1856 Orlov headed the infamous Third Section (secret police).

In 1854 he travelled to Vienna to bring Austria over to the side of Russia during the Crimean War of 1853–1856, but without success. In 1856 he was one of the plenipotentiaries who concluded the Peace of Paris. In the same year, raised to the dignity of prince, he was appointed president of the Imperial Council of State and of the Council of Ministers; in both positions until 1861. In 1857, during the absence of Emperor Alexander II, he presided over the commission formed to consider the question of the emancipation of the serfs, to which he was altogether hostile. He died in Saint Petersburg.

== In popular culture ==
Orlov was the subject of a satirical verse by Alexander Pushkin, alleging that Orlov's mistress, the dancer Istomina, could see his penis only through a microscope.

== Sources ==
- Tupitsyn, O. M. (2023). "ОРЛОВ АЛЕКСЕЙ ФЁДОРОВИЧ". Great Russian Encyclopedia. Electronic version.
