= Orlov family =

Russian noble family

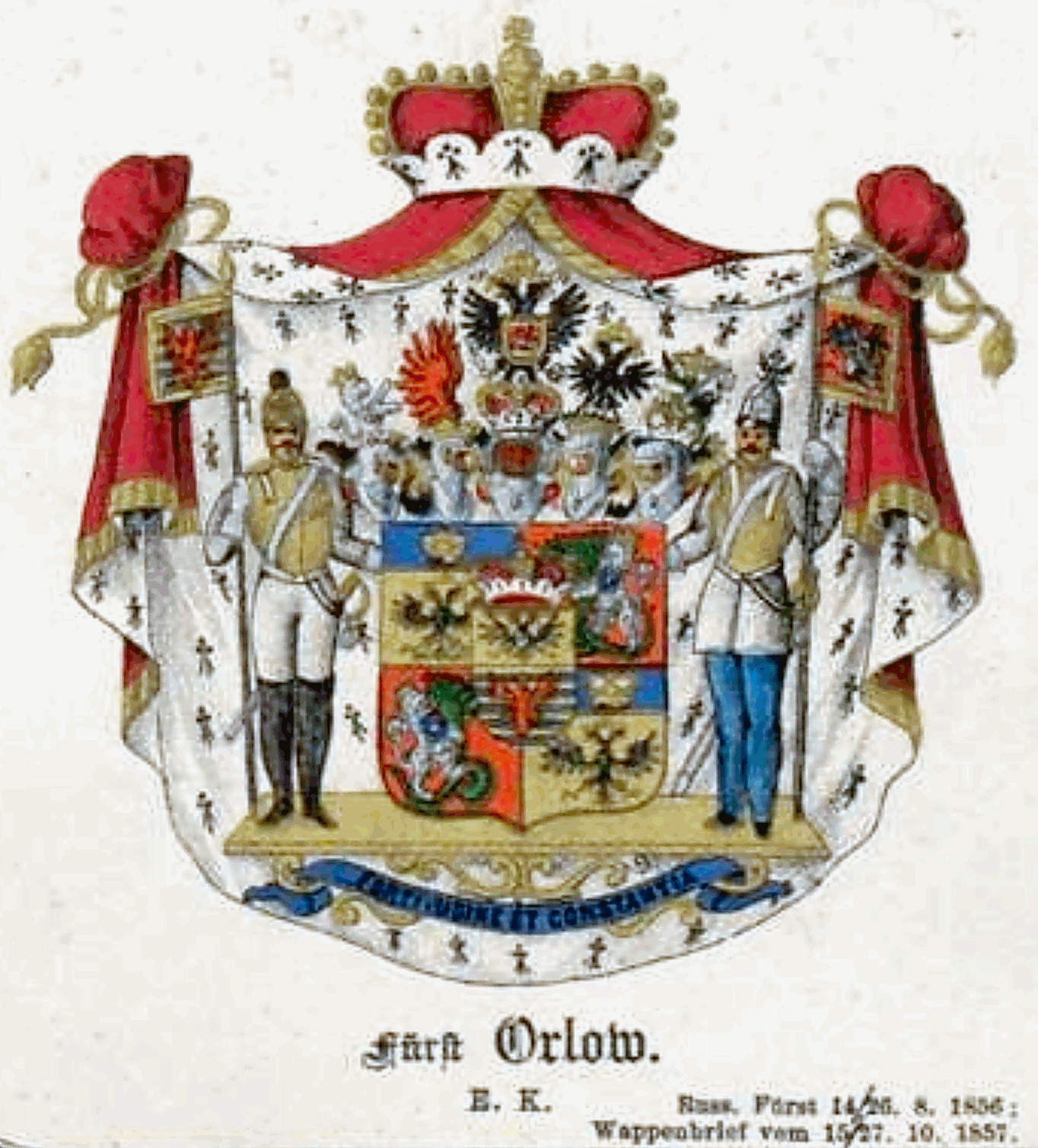
Coat of arms of Princes Orlov

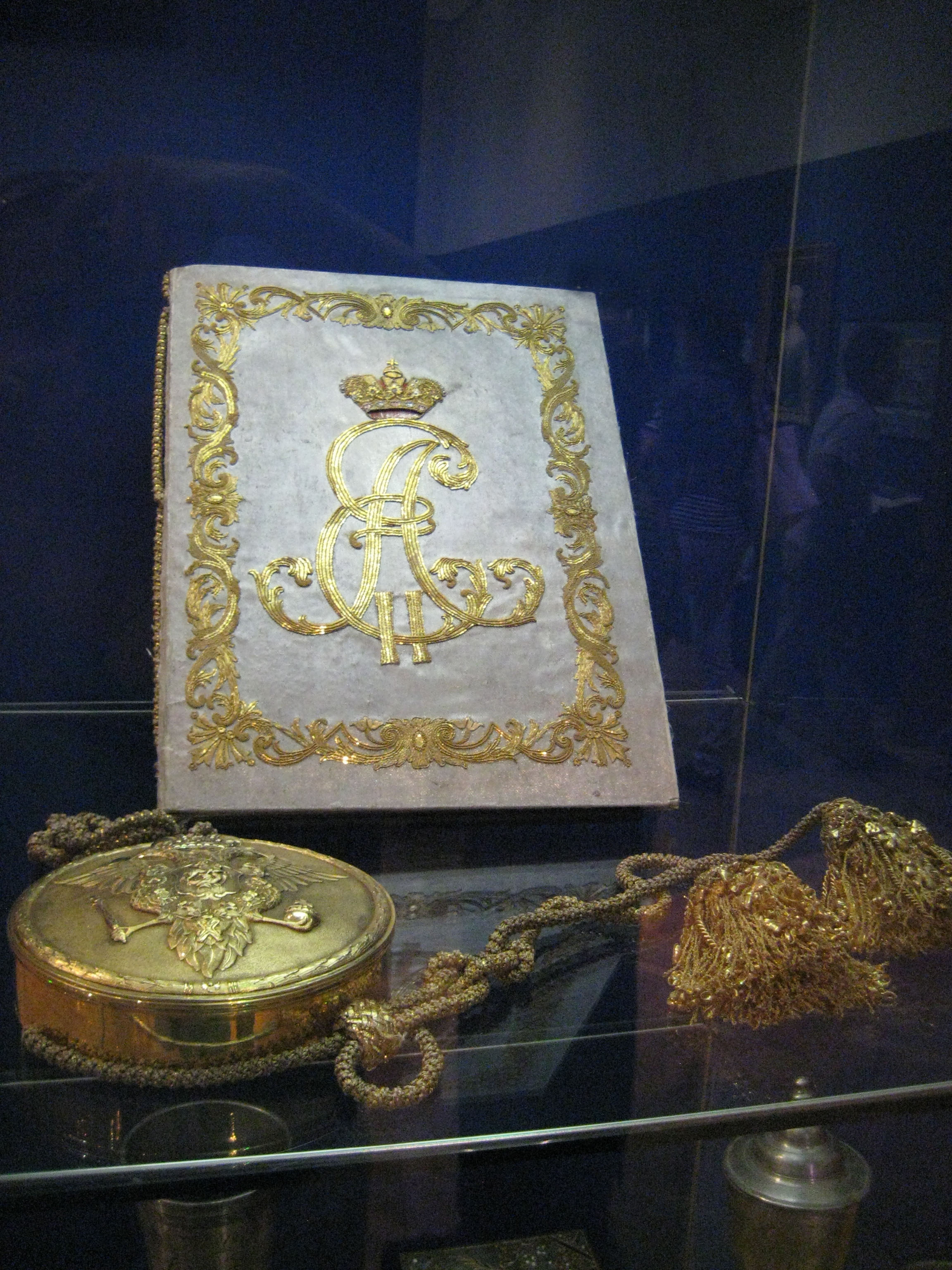
Catherine the Great's charter of creation of the title of Count Orlov, 1763

The House of Orlov (Russian: Орлóв) is a Russian princely family which produced several distinguished statesmen, scientists, diplomats, and soldiers. The family first gained distinction in the 18th century through the achievements of five Orlov brothers, of whom the second eldest was Catherine the Great's paramour, and two younger brothers were notable military commanders.

== Orlov brothers ==
=== Grigory Grigoryevich Orlov ===
Count Grigory Grigoryevich Orlov (1734–1783), who created for his family such an illustrious Russian history, was the son of Gregory Orlov, governor of Great Novgorod. He was educated in the corps of cadets at St Petersburg, began his military career in the Seven Years' War, and was wounded at Zorndorf. While serving in the capital as an artillery officer he caught the fancy of Grand Duchess Catherine Alekseyevna, and was the leader of the conspiracy which resulted in the dethronement and death of her husband Peter III (1762).

After the event, Catherine raised him to the rank of count and made him adjutant-general, director-general of engineers and general-in-chief. Their illegitimate son, Aleksey, was born in 1762 and named after the village of Bobriki where he lived; from him descends the line of Counts Bobrinskoy. Orlov's influence became paramount after the discovery of the Khitrovo plot to murder the whole Orlov family. At one time the empress thought of marrying her favorite, but the plan was frustrated by her influential advisor Nikita Panin.

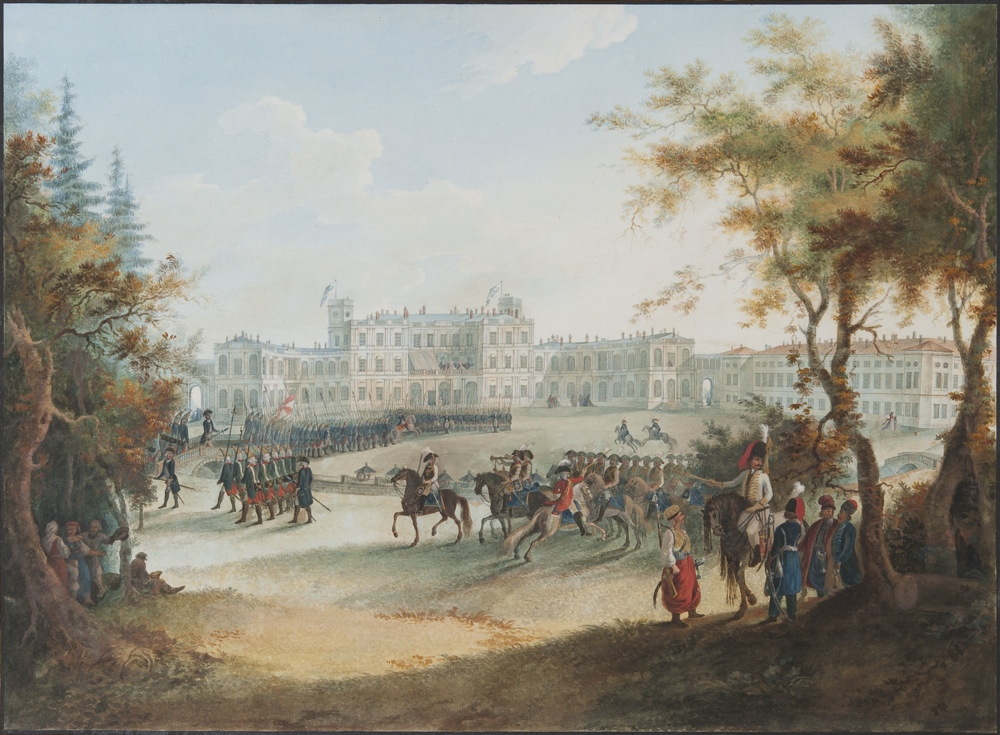
Grigory Orlov sold his huge manor and castle in Gatchina to the crown in 1783.

Gregory Orlov was no statesman, but he had a quick wit, a fairly accurate appreciation of current events, and was a useful and sympathetic counsellor during the earlier portion of Catherine's reign. He entered with enthusiasm, both from patriotic and from economical motives, into the question of the improvement of the condition of the serfs and their partial emancipation. As the President of the Free Economic Society, he was also their most prominent advocate in the great commission of 1767, though he aimed primarily at pleasing the empress, who affected great liberality in her earlier years.

He was one of the earliest propagandists of the Slavophile idea of the emancipation of the Christians from Ottoman rule. In the year of 1771 he was sent as first Russian plenipotentiary to the peace congress of Focşani; but he failed in his mission, owing partly to the obstinacy of the Ottomans, and partly (according to Panin) to his own outrageous insolence. On returning without permission to his Marble Palace at St Petersburg, he found himself superseded in the empress's favor by the younger Potemkin.

In order to rekindle Catherine's affection, Grigory presented to her one of the greater diamonds of the world, known ever since as the Orlov Diamond. When Grigory Potemkin, in 1771, superseded Vasil'chikov, Orlov became of no account at court and went abroad for some years. He returned to Russia a few months previously to his death, which took place at Moscow in 1783. For some time before his death he was out of his mind. Late in life he married his niece, Madame Zinovyeva, but left no children by that marriage.

=== Alexei Grigoryevich Orlov ===
Count Alexei Grigoryevich Orlov (1737–1808), brother of the above, was by far the ablest member of the Orlov count family, and was also remarkable for his athletic strength and dexterity. In the palace revolution of 1762 he played an even more important part than his brother Gregory. It is alleged that he conveyed Peter III to the chateau of Ropsha and murdered him there with his own hands. (Note: However, this is only conjecture, though Orlov's involvement is often cited and widely believed. It's believed that Catherine made sure she was nowhere near and claimed not to know of the murder until it was accomplished; sometimes it is said, against her will.)

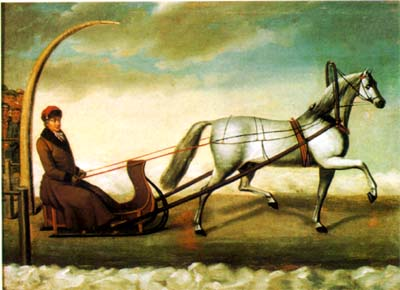
In the 19th century, Orlov trotters were considered the fastest in Europe.

In 1770 he was appointed commander-in-chief of the fleet sent against the Turks, whose far superior navy he annihilated at Chesme, a victory which led to the so-called Orlov Revolt and conquest of the Greek archipelago. For this exploit he received, in 1774, the honorific epithet Chesmensky, and the privilege of quartering the imperial arms in his shield.

The same year, on Catherine's request, he went to Livorno to seduce and bring to Russia the so-called Princess Tarakanova, who proclaimed herself daughter of Empress Elizabeth. Having succeeded in this unusual commission, he went into retirement and settled at Moscow.

There he devoted himself to breeding livestock, and produced the "finest race of horses" then known, the Orlov Trotter, by crossing Arabian Horses with the heavier but lively Friesian and with tall, swift English racing stallions. He also refined and popularized a breed of chicken, now called the Orloff in his honor. In the war with Napoleon during 1806–07, Orlov commanded the militia of the fifth district, which was placed on a war footing almost entirely at his own expense. He left an estate worth five million roubles and 30,000 serfs.

Beside of animal breeding he also formed the first Roma-choir (1774), selected out of his numerous Roma serfs (Note: They were Xeladitka also called Russka Rom, not as sometimes thought imported slaves from Moldavië (Vlach) or from Oekraine (Servi-Rom)). The choir reached an enormous popularity under the Russian aristocracy, and was copied by several other aristocrats training their Roma to sing in choirs. In 1807 the Orlov choir was given freedom. They could settle themselves in Moscow (which was forbidden to all other Roma) and lived and behaved as the aristocrats around them. Their offspring attended school and university and became the first Roma-intelligentsia. The Roma choirs influenced the image of the Roma in Russia a lot until at least the 20th century.

=== The other Counts Orlov ===
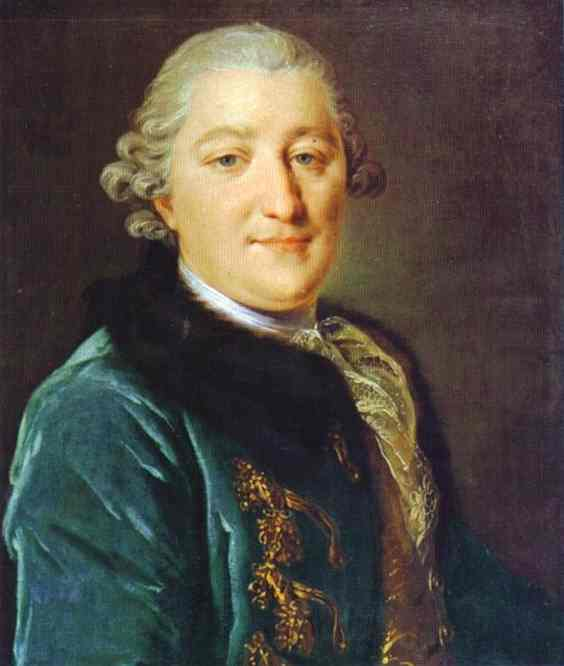
Portrait of Ivan Orlov, by Fyodor Rokotov

The oldest and least notable of five Orlov brothers was Ivan Grigoryevich Orlov (1733–1791). After his father's death in 1746 he became the head of the family; all Orlov brothers looked upon him and respected him as their father. He led a modest life and managed the Orlovs' estates. Even after the palace revolution of 1762, when the Orlovs became counts and got enormous fortune, he apparently refused any state career and titles and continued to live in Moscow and the Orlovs' estates.

The fourth Orlov brother was Count Fyodor Grigoryevich (1741–1796), Russian general, who first distinguished himself in the Seven Years' War. He participated with his elder brothers in the coup d'etat of 1762, after which he was appointed chief procurator of the Governing Senate. During the first Turkish War of Catherine II he served under Admiral Spiridov, and was one of the first to break through the Turkish line of battle at Chesme. Subsequently, at Hydra, he put to flight eighteen Turkish vessels. These exploits were, by the order of Catherine, commemorated by a triumphal column, crowned with naval trophies, erected at Tsarskoe Selo. Friend of the Count, Count Saint-Germain, gave him assistance while in Turkey by creating Russian Tea, or as they nicknamed it "Acqua Benedetta", which helped the Russian troops fight the climate of the land. In 1775 he retired from the public service. Orlov was never married, but had five natural children (including Alexey Fyodorovich Orlov), whom Catherine ennobled and legitimatized, as may be seen below.

Count Vladimir Orlov, a marble bust by Fedot Shubin.

The youngest Orlov brother was Count Vladimir Grigorievich (1743–1831). He was just 19 when his elder brothers came to power, and they deemed it wise to send him to the Leipzig University. Although his education was spasmodic at best, the Empress appointed him President of the Russian Academy of Sciences upon his return four years later. His ignorance of Latin led him to expel the language from the Academy; it was replaced with German, in which he was fairly fluent. On this account, he came to patronize German scientists such as Peter Simon Pallas and invited many of them to Russia. In 1767 he accompanied Catherine II during her journey along the Volga, documenting it in a journal. After his brother fell into disgrace, Vladimir was fired from his post and retired to his villages.

He had several daughters, one of them a wife of Nikita Petrovich Panin, and a son — Count Grigory Vladimirovich (1777 – 22 June 1826) — who predeceased his father. Like him, Grigory the Younger devoted himself to the sciences. In November 1799 he married Countess Anna Saltykova, left Russia and traveled in France, Italy and Switzerland. While living in Paris, Orlov translated into French some fables by Ivan Krylov. After the death of his wife, Count Orlov returned to Russia. His chief works are Mémoirs historiques, politiques et littéraires sur le Royaume de Naples, translated into German, English and Italian, and embracing the History of Lower Italy from the earliest times until 1820; Histoire des Arts en Italie, the two volumes of which treat of music, the others of painting; Voyages dans une Partie de la France, ou Lettres descriptives et historiques (Paris, 1824). From 25 January 1809 he was an honorary member of the Russian Academy of Sciences. All of his three sons were born out of wedlock.

== Princes Orlov ==
=== Alexey Fyodorovich Orlov ===
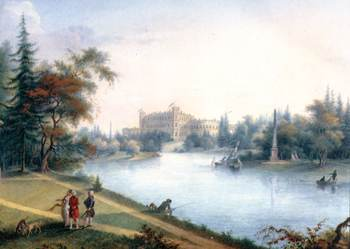
The Eagle Monument in Gatchina refers to the Orlovs' surname, derived from the Russian word for eagle

Prince Alexey Fyodorovich Orlov (1787–1862), the natural son of Count Fyodor Grigoryevich, was born on 8 October (19 October 1786 New Style) in Moscow and took part in all the Napoleonic wars from 1805 to the capture of Paris. For his services as commander of the cavalry regiment of the Life Guards on the occasion of the rebellion of 1825 he was created a count, and in the Turkish War of 1828–1829 rose to the rank of lieutenant-general. It is from this time that the brilliant diplomatic career of Orlov begins. He was the Russian plenipotentiary at the Peace of Adrianople, and in 1833 was appointed Russian ambassador at Constantinople, holding at the same time the post of commander-in-chief of the Black Sea fleet. He was, indeed, one of the most trustworthy agents of Nicholas I, whom in 1837 he accompanied on his foreign tour. From 1844 to 1856 he was in charge of the infamous Third Section, or secret police.

In 1854 he was sent to Vienna to bring Austria over to the side of Russia, but without success. In 1856 he was one of the plenipotentiaries who concluded the peace of Paris. The same year he was raised to the dignity of prince, and was appointed president of the imperial council of state and of the council of ministers. In 1857, during the absence of the emperor, he presided over the commission formed to consider the question of the emancipation of the serfs, to which he was altogether hostile. He died on 9 May (21 May) 1862 in St. Petersburg.

=== Other Princes Orlov ===
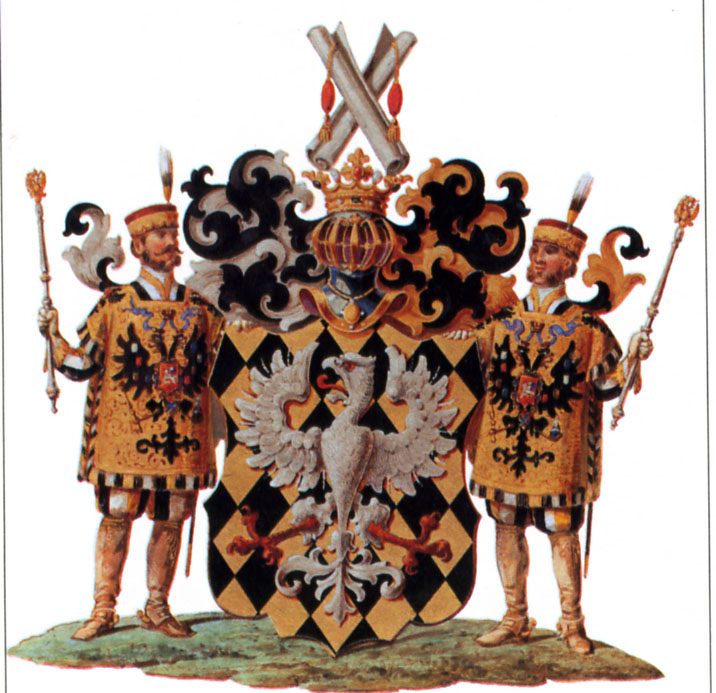
Coat of arms of the Orlov family

Alexey Fyodorovich Orlov's only son, Prince Nikolay Alexeyevich Orlov (1827–1885), was a distinguished Russian diplomatist and author. He first adopted a military career, and was seriously wounded in the Crimean War. Subsequently, he entered the diplomatic service, and represented Russia successively at Brussels (1860–1870), Paris (1870–1882) and Berlin (1882–1885). As a publicist he stood in the forefront of reform. His articles on corporal punishment, which appeared in Russkaya Starina in 1881, brought about its abolition. He also advocated tolerance towards the dissenters. His wife, Katherine (Kathi) Orlov had a close relationship with Otto von Bismarck in the early 1860s. Bismarck's wife said she was not jealous and credited her with a long period of Bismarck's happiness. (Bismarck: The Man and the Statesman by A J P Taylor. Sutton History Classics)

Prince Alexey Fyodorovich also had a brother, Mikhail Fyodorovich Orlov (1788–1842), who took a most active part in the Napoleonic wars and received the rank of General-major upon returning to Russia in 1814. A friend of Alexander Pushkin and convinced liberal himself, he now concentrated his attention on the projects for emancipation of the serfs and introduction of republican government in Russia. Since 1818, he was in charge of the Kishinev section of the Decembrist society. After the revolt failed, he was arrested but presently released on bail, through his brother's mediation. Thereupon he settled in Moscow and published a pioneering study of the state credit.

Prince Vladimir Nikolayevich Orlov was a close advisor to Tsar Nicholas II.

== See also ==
- Fedor Polikarpov-Orlov
- The Orlov Diamond
- Orlov trotter
- Orlov Revolt
- Veal Orloff
- John Orloff
- Marble Palace
- Gatchina Palace
- Aleksandr Orlov
