= Cavos =

Cavos (also spelled Kavos; Russian: Кавос) is the name of an Italian family of composers, musicians, and architects who settled in the Russian Empire at the end of 18th century. They came of an old, well-to-do Venetian family.

== Notable family members ==
Catterino Cavos (Russian: Катерино Альбертович Кавос) also Catarino Camillo Cavos (1775–1840), is one of the most prominent members of the Cavos family. He was the son Alberto Giovanni Cavos, the Primo Ballerino Assuluto of the Fenice Theater and Camilla Baglioni, the Diva of the same opera house in Venice. He became a composer and conductor at the Imperial Theatre in Saint Petersburg. Cavos collaborated with Mikhail Glinka particularly in some of the latter's compositions. In 1836, for example, Cavos conducted Glinka's opera, A Life for the Tsar. This piece, which was about the story of the legendary peasant-hero Ivan Susanin, is particularly important because Cavos himself wrote a composition about the same subject twenty years before.

Cavos is also identified as an ancestor of Alexander Tcherepnin from the American composer's maternal side.

List of prominent representatives:

- Alberto Giovanni Cavos was a director of the Venice theatre La Fenice
  - Catarino Camillo Cavos a.k.a. Catterino Albertovich Cavos, his son
  - Albert Catterinovich Cavos (1800–1863), Catterino Cavos' son, was an architect who was in charge for the rebuilding of the Mariinsky Theatre in Saint Petersburg and the Bolshoi Theatre in Moscow.
  - Ivan Catterinovich Cavos (1805–1861), received musical training and served thirty years in the Imperial Theatres in St. Petersburg, holding various positions, including Director of Orchestras, Director of Italian Opera, and Inspector of the Smolny Convent.
- Caesar Albertovich Cavos (1824–1883), son of Albert Cavos, academician of architecture, was responsible for the construction of several buildings in Saint Petersburg.
- Camilla Albertovna Cavos, daughter of Albert Cavos, married Nicholas Benois, a prominent Russian architect, and became the matriarch of the Benois family. Her descendants included many notable painters, sculptors, architects, musicians and actors.
