= Henry Sutherland Edwards =

British journalist (1828–1906)

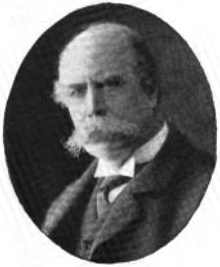
- In The Sketch, 6 March 1901
- Born: 5 September 1828; Hendon, London, England
- Died: 21 January 1906 (aged 77); London, England
- Occupation: Journalist

Henry Sutherland Edwards (1828–1906) was a British journalist.

== Biography ==
He was born in Hendon on 5 September 1827, and educated in London and France. He was correspondent of The Times at the coronation of Alexander II of Russia, in the camp of the insurgents at Warsaw (1862–63), and at German army headquarters during the Franco-Prussian War.

In 1865 he took over the role of chief music critic on The Morning Post from Howard Glover and he was a regular contributor to The Pall Mall Gazette. He was the first editor of the weekly illustrated newspaper The Graphic.

He died at his home in London on 21 January 1906, and was buried at St. John's Cemetery in Woking.

== Selected publications ==
- The Russians at Home (1861)
- The Polish Captivity: An Account of the Present Position of the Poles in the Kingdom of Poland, and in the Polish Provinces of Austria, Prussia, and Russia (1863)
- The Life of Rossini (1869)
- The Germans in France (1874)
- The Russians at Home and the Russians Abroad (1879, Vol. 1 is an abridgment of the 1861 book Russians at Home. Vol. 2 deals with political issues.)
- The Lyrical Drama: Essays on Subjects, Composers, & Executants of Modern Opera (1881)
- The Case of Reuben Malachi (1886)
- The Prima Donna: Her History and Surroundings from the Seventeenth to the Nineteenth Century (two volumes, 1888)
- Rossini and His School (1895)
- Personal Recollections (1900)
- Sir William White, K.C.B., K.C.M.G.: For Six Years Ambassador to Constantinople: His Life and Correspondence. London: John Murray. 1902 – via Internet Archive.
