= 1965 in fine arts of the Soviet Union =

The year 1965 was marked by many events that left an imprint on the history of Soviet and Russian Fine Arts.

== Events ==
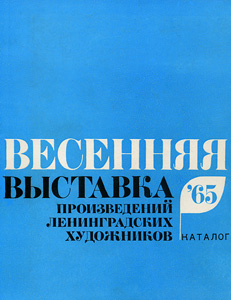
Exhibition catalog

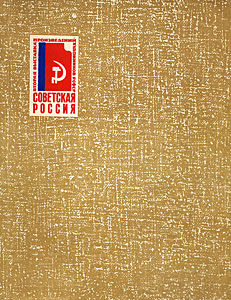
Exhibition catalog

- All-Union Art Exhibition «On Guard for Peace» dedicated to 20th anniversary of Victory in the Great Patriotic War, opened in Moscow. The participants were Boris Korneev, Engels Kozlov, Boris Lavrenko, Oleg Lomakin, Evsey Moiseenko, Yuri Neprintsev, Ivan Savenko, Gleb Savinov, Yuri Tulin, and others.
- Spring exhibition of works by leningrad artists opened in the Leningrad Union of Artists. The participants were Piotr Alberti, Evgenia Antipova, Taisia Afonina, Vsevolod Bazhenov, Yuri Belov, Olga Bogaevskaya, Vladimir Gavrilov, Irina Getmanskaya, Vasily Golubev, Irina Dobrekova, Maya Kopitseva, Alexander Koroviakov, Mikhail Kozell, Engels Kozlov, Elena Kostenko, Gevork Kotiantz, Vladimir Krantz, Valeria Larina, Boris Lavrenko, Ivan Lavsky, Oleg Lomakin, Dmitry Maevsky, Gavriil Malish, Valentina Monakhova, Nikolai Mukho, Vera Nazina, Mikhail Natarevich, Anatoli Nenartovich, Dmitry Oboznenko, Sergei Osipov, Lev Orekhov, Victor Otiev, Nikolai Pozdneev, Maria Rudnitskaya, Ivan Savenko, Vladimir Sakson, Alexander Semionov, Arseny Semionov, Boris Shamanov, Alexander Shmidt, Nadezhda Shteinmiller, Elena Skuin, Alexander Stolbov, Victor Teterin, Nikolai Timkov, Yuri Tulin, Vitaly Tulenev, Boris Ugarov, Ivan Varichev, Anatoli Vasiliev, Igor Veselkin, Rostislav Vovkushevsky, Lazar Yazgur, Vecheslav Zagonek, Ruben Zakharian, and other important Leningrad artists.
- The Second National Fine Art Exhibition «Soviet Russia» opened in Moscow. The participants were Yuri Belov, Piotr Belousov, Oleg Lomakin, Dmitry Maevsky, Evsey Moiseenko, Dmitry Oboznenko, Yuri Neprintsev, Gleb Savinov, Nikolai Timkov, Vitaly Tulenev, Boris Ugarov, Yuri Tulin, Vecheslav Zagonek, and others.
- November 22 — The Autumn exhibition of works by leningrad artists opened in the Leningrad Union of Artists. Were exhibited 1500 art works by 500 authors, among them Elena Kostenko, Engels Kozlov, Dmitry Maevsky, Nikolai Timkov, Ivan Savenko, Vecheslav Zagonek, and other important Leningrad artists.

== Deaths ==
- February 18 — Yevgeny Charushin (Russian: Чарушин Евгений Иванович), Russian soviet graphic artists, Honored art worker of Russian Federation, (born 1901).
- June 21 — Piotr Buchkin (Russian: Бучкин Пётр Дмитриевич), Russian soviet painter and graphic artists, Honored art worker of Russian Federation, (born 1886).
- December 9 — Victoria Belakovskaya (Russian: Белаковская Виктория Марковна), Russian soviet painter and graphic artists (born 1901).
- Alexei Laptev (Russian: Лаптев Алексей Михайлович), Russian soviet graphic artists, Honored art worker of Russian Federation (born 1905).
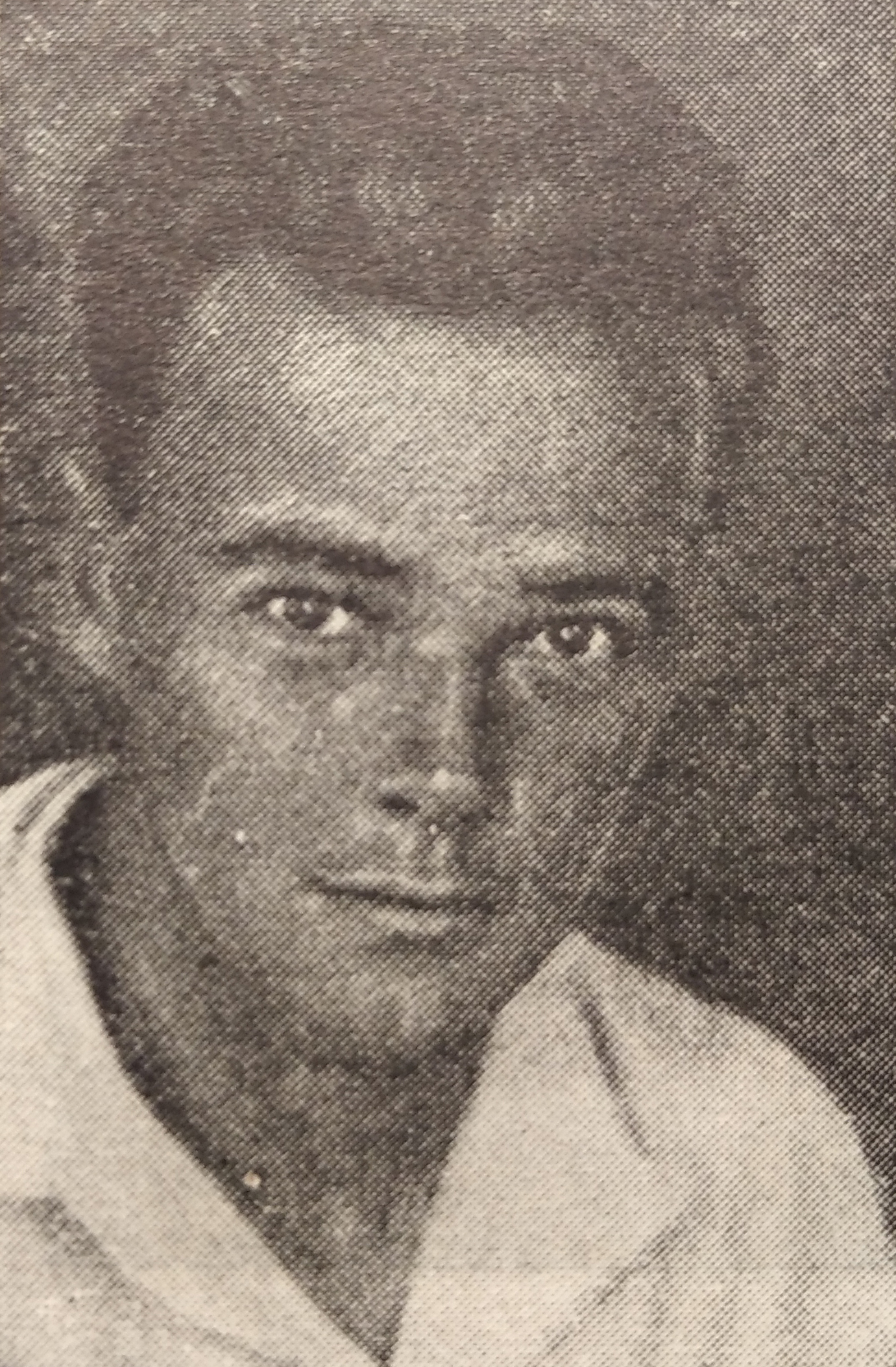
Yevgeny Charushin

== See also ==
- List of Russian artists
- List of painters of Leningrad Union of Artists
- Saint Petersburg Union of Artists
- Russian culture

== Sources ==
- Никифоровская И. У художников весна. // Ленинградская правда, 1965, 19 июня.
- Новые работы художников. // Ленинградская правда, 1965, 23 ноября.
- Никифоровская И. Отчитываться мастерством. // Ленинградская правда, 1965, 26 ноября.
- Старостин Г. Художники советуются со зрителем. // Смена, 1965, 8 декабря.
- Вторая Республиканская художественная выставка "Советская Россия". Живопись. Скульптура. Графика. Монументально-декоративное и театрально-декорационное искусство. Каталог. М., Советский художник, 1965.
- Всесоюзная художественная выставка «На страже мира». К 20-летию Победы советского народа в Великой Отечественной войне. М., Советский художник, 1965.
- Весенняя выставка произведений ленинградских художников. 1965 год. Каталог. Л., Художник РСФСР, 1970.
- Artists of Peoples of the USSR. Biography Dictionary. Vol. 1. Moscow, Iskusstvo, 1970.
- Artists of Peoples of the USSR. Biography Dictionary. Vol. 2. Moscow, Iskusstvo, 1972.
- Directory of Members of Union of Artists of USSR. Volume 1,2. Moscow, Soviet Artist Edition, 1979.
- Directory of Members of the Leningrad branch of the Union of Artists of Russian Federation. Leningrad, Khudozhnik RSFSR, 1980.
- Artists of Peoples of the USSR. Biography Dictionary. Vol. 4 Book 1. Moscow, Iskusstvo, 1983.
- Directory of Members of the Leningrad branch of the Union of Artists of Russian Federation. - Leningrad: Khudozhnik RSFSR, 1987.
- Artists of peoples of the USSR. Biography Dictionary. Vol. 4 Book 2. - Saint Petersburg: Academic project humanitarian agency, 1995.
- Link of Times: 1932 - 1997. Artists - Members of Saint Petersburg Union of Artists of Russia. Exhibition catalogue. - Saint Petersburg: Manezh Central Exhibition Hall, 1997.
- Matthew C. Bown. Dictionary of 20th Century Russian and Soviet Painters 1900-1980s. London, Izomar, 1998.
- Vern G. Swanson. Soviet Impressionism. Woodbridge, England, Antique Collectors' Club, 2001.
- Время перемен. Искусство 1960—1985 в Советском Союзе. СПб., Государственный Русский музей, 2006.
- Sergei V. Ivanov. Unknown Socialist Realism. The Leningrad School. Saint-Petersburg, NP-Print Edition, 2007. ISBN 5-901724-21-6, ISBN 978-5-901724-21-7.
- Anniversary Directory graduates of Saint Petersburg State Academic Institute of Painting, Sculpture, and Architecture named after Ilya Repin, Russian Academy of Arts. 1915 - 2005. Saint Petersburg: Pervotsvet Publishing House, 2007.
