= Autumn exhibition (Leningrad, 1968) =

1968 Soviet art exhibition

Autumn Exhibition of Leningrad artists of 1968. Catalog
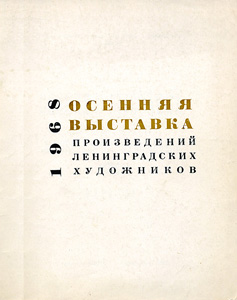
- Year: 1968
- Location: Leningrad Union of Soviet Artists Exhibition Halls; Leningrad

Autumn Exhibition of Leningrad artists of 1968 (Russian: Осенняя выставка произведений ленинградских художников 1968 года) opened in Exhibition Halls of the Leningrad Union of Soviet Artists became one of the largest Art Exhibitions of 1968 in the USSR.

== History and Organization ==
For the organization and preparation of Exhibition, an Exhibition Committee was formed specially. The Committee consisted of the most authoritative art-experts. Also, an Exhibition Catalog was published. In total, the Exhibition displayed almost 500 works of art of painters, sculptors, graphics, artists of theater and cinema, masters of arts and crafts. At whole Exhibition attended over 300 artists of the Leningrad.

== Contributing Artists ==
In the largest Department of Painting were exhibited art works of 126 authors. There were Piotr Alberti, Vsevolod Bazhenov, Dmitry Buchkin, Sergei Frolov, Nikolai Galakhov, Tatiana Gorb, Vladimir Gorb, Mikhail Kaneev, Maria Kleschar-Samokhvalova, Victor Korovin, Elena Kostenko, Nikolai Kostrov, Anna Kostrova, Gevork Kotiantz, Mikhail Kozell, Engels Kozlov, Vladimir Krantz, Ivan Lavsky, Dmitry Maevsky, Gavriil Malish, Eugene Maltsev, Nikolai Mukho, Mikhail Natarevich, Sergei Osipov, Vladimir Ovchinnikov, Lev Orekhov, Victor Otiev, Genrikh Pavlovsky, Varlen Pen, Maria Rudnitskaya, Ivan Savenko, Vladimir Sakson, Alexander Semionov, Arseny Semionov, Boris Shamanov, Alexander Shmidt, Elena Skuin, Kim Slavin, Alexander Stolbov, German Tatarinov, Nikolai Timkov, Mikhail Trufanov, Yuri Tulin, Ivan Varichev, Anatoli Vasiliev, Rostislav Vovkushevsky, Lazar Yazgur, Vecheslav Zagonek, Sergei Zakharov, Ruben Zakharian, Elena Zhukova, and others most prominent painters of the Leningrad School.

In the Department of Sculptures were exhibited art works of 55 sculptors. Department of graphics presented a creation of 62 artists.

== Contributed Artworks ==
The Exhibition curated selected art works created between 1967-1968. It also included some earlier works. These works were all exhibited for the first time. Some of them were subsequently found in the collections of Soviet Art museums, as well as domestic and foreign galleries and collectors.

Portrait was presented of "Valia Komrakova, Komsomol member" by Maria Kleschar-Samokhvalova, "Portrait of Mother" by Elena Kostenko, "Portrait of artist Victor Valcefer" by Engels Kozlov, "Postwoman Nina" by Dmitry Maevsky, "Girlfriends" by Victor Otiev, "Portrait of art critic Brodsky" by Varlen Pen, "Female portrait", "Portrait of artist Oganesov" by Mikhail Trufanov, and others.

Genre painting was presented of "In Klaipėda" by Victor Korovin, "In Bathroom in the Morning" by Elena Kostenko, "On the shore" by Eugene Maltsev, "At the Bus Stop" by Mikhail Natarevich, "New Suburb" by German Tatarinov, "A Youth" by Anatoli Vasiliev, and others.

Landscape and Cityscape were presented of "Aspens" by Piotr Alberti, "Spring sketch", "Winter sketch" by Vsevolod Bazhenov, "Pskov", "Izborsk" by Dmitry Buchkin, "Twilight", "Bad weather" by Sergei Frolov, "Karelia. A Warm winter", "A Morning" by Nikolai Galakhov, "Canary Islands" by Vladimir Gavrilov, "Novgorod. Yaroslavovo Dvorishche", "Pskov. Church of Michael Archangel" by Mikhail Kaneev, "Autumn", "Nida. In the dunes" by Victor Korovin, "Backwater", "Cowhouse" by Mikhail Kozell, "Early May" by Vladimir Krantz, "Mountain pass" by Ivan Lavsky, "Kola Bay" by Nikolai Mukho, "Spring", "Evening" by Mikhail Natarevich, "A Midday", "Ferriage in Old Ladoga" by Lev Orekhov, "April", "Gypsum plant" by Sergei Osipov, "Volkhov River in evening", "On the river" by Victor Otiev, "Street in Pristannoye", "Twilight", "Torzhok" by Vladimir Ovchinnikov, "Cēsis" by Varlen Pen, "A March", "Early Spring", "Spring. A Blue day" by Ivan Savenko, "A Night", "Morning" by Vladimir Sakson, "Yaroslavl Kremlin", "Small Bridge", "Pushkin town. Lyceum" by Alexander Semionov, "Suzdal. View on the Kremkin", "Suzdal. Relict of the ancient Architecture" by Arseny Semionov, "Courtyard on the South" by Alexander Shmidt, "The Russia", "The Silent river", "Russia" by Kim Slavin, "Landscape with haying" by Alexander Stolbov, "Sunny Day", "Haystack", "A Winter has come", "Autumn" by Nikolai Timkov, "Pskov land expanse" by Yuri Tulin, "Warm Autumn", "A Window", "A Wind", "Syas River" by Ivan Varichev, "Spring on the Volkhov River" by Lazar Yazgur, "Autumn forest", "Winter window" by Vecheslav Zagonek, "Spring in Tadzhikistan", "Factory settlement" by Sergei Zakharov, "Old Tbilisi" by Ruben Zakharian, "Exultant spring", "Gorge in the mountains" Elena Zhukova, by and others.

Still life paintings were presented of "Still life" by Dmitry Buchkin, "White Roses in the Pink Jug" by Vladimir Gorb, "Interior" by Maria Kleschar-Samokhvalova, "Pink Still life", "Still life" by Gevork Kotiantz, "Still life with Jug" by Sergei Osipov, "Food of fisherman", "In the country. Still life", "Breakfast of lineman" by Genrikh Pavlovsky, "Still life with Red Tray" by Maria Rudnitskaya, "Dog-rose" by Boris Shamanov, "Still life with Jug and Persimmon", "Light-Blue Still life" by Elena Skuin, "Still life" by Mikhail Trufanov, "Fruits on the Table", "Cactus" by Gleb Verner, "Miner's still life" by Rostislav Vovkushevsky, and others.

== Acknowledgment ==
Autumn Exhibition of Leningrad artists of 1968 was widely covered in press and in literature on Soviet fine art.

== See also ==
- Fine Art of Leningrad
- Leningrad School of Painting
- 1968 in fine arts of the Soviet Union
- Saint Petersburg Union of Artists
- Socialist realism

== Sources ==
- Осенняя выставка произведений ленинградских художников 1968 года. Каталог. Л., Художник РСФСР, 1971.
- Справочник членов Ленинградской организации Союза художников РСФСР. Л., Художник РСФСР, 1980.
- Художники народов СССР. Биобиблиографический словарь. Т.1-4. М., Искусство, 1970-1995.
- Справочник членов Союза художников СССР. Т.1-2. М., Советский художник, 1979.
- Хроника узловых событий художественной жизни России 1960-1980-х годов // Time for Change. The Art of 1960-1985 in the Soviet Union. Saint Petersburg, State Russian Museum, 2006.
- Sergei V. Ivanov. Unknown Socialist Realism. The Leningrad School. Saint Petersburg, NP-Print Edition, 2007. P.396, 417, 442. ISBN 5-901724-21-6, ISBN 978-5-901724-21-7
- Юбилейный Справочник выпускников Санкт-Петербургского академического института живописи, скульптуры и архитектуры имени И. Е. Репина Российской Академии художеств. 1915—2005. Санкт Петербург, «Первоцвет», 2007.
