= 1973 in fine arts of the Soviet Union =

The year 1973 was marked by many events that left an imprint on the history of Soviet and Russian Fine Arts.

== Events ==
- The Spring Exhibition of works by Leningrad artists was opened in the Leningrad Union of Artists.
- The Third Exhibition by Leningrad artists named «Our Contemporary» was opened in Russian museum in Leningrad. The participants were Nikolai Baskakov, Yuri Belov, Nikolai Galakhov, Vladimir Gorb, Tatiana Gorb, Elena Gorokhova, Alexei Eriomin, Yuri Khukhrov, Boris Korneev, Engels Kozlov, Boris Lavrenko, Oleg Lomakin, Dmitry Maevsky, Valentina Monakhova, Vera Nazina, Dmitry Oboznenko, Nikolai Pozdneev, Galina Rumiantseva, Alexander Stolbov, Anatoli Vasiliev, and other important Leningrad artists.
- Exhibition of works of modern soviet artists was opened in Tokyo in the Gekkoso Gallery. The participants were Mikhail Kozell, Vladimir Krantz, Dmitry Maevsky, Ivan Lavsky, Andrei Mylnikov, Mikhail Tkachev, and other important soviet artists.
- The Exhibition of works of Leningrad artists named «Still Life» was opened in the Leningrad Union of Artists. The participants were Alberti Piotr, Zaven Arshakuny, Genrykh Bagrov, Yuri Belov, Nikolai Brandt, Valery Vatenin, Tatiana Gorb, Sergei Zakharov, Ruben Zakharian, Tatiana Kopnina, Gevork Kotiantz, Lydia Milova, Sergei Osipov, Nikolai Pozdneev, Alexander Semionov, Arseny Semionov, Elena Skuin, and other important Leningrad artists.
- The Fall Exhibition of works of Leningrad artists was opened in the Leningrad Union of Artists. The participants were Igor Veselkin, Nikolai Galakhov, Vasily Golubev, Vladimir Gorb, Irina Dobrekova, Mikhail Kozell, Engels Kozlov, Maya Kopitseva, Gevork Kotiantz, Vladimir Krantz, Ivan Lavsky, Vera Nazina, Mikhail Natarevich, Samuil Nevelshtein, Vladimir Ovchinnikov, Sergei Osipov, Nikolai Pozdneev, Vladimir Sakson, Alexander Semionov, Arseny Semionov, Elena Skuin, German Tatarinov, Nikolai Timkov, Yuri Tulin, Vitaly Tulenev, Yuri Shablikin, Boris Shamanov, Lazar Yazgur, and other important Leningrad artists.

== Deaths ==
- February 25 — Boris Ioganson (Russian: Иогансон Борис Владимирович), Russian soviet painter, People's Artist of the USSR, Stalin Prize winner (born 1893).
- April 14 — Alexei Pakhomov (Russian: Пахомов Алексей Фёдорович), Russian soviet painter and graphic artist, People's Artist of the USSR, Stalin Prize winner (born 1900).
- May 3 — Yuri Vasnetsov (Russian: Васнецов Юрий Алексеевич), Russian soviet painter and graphic artist, People's Artist of the RSFSR (born 1900).
- May 9 — Alexander Sokolov (Russian: Соколов Александр Иванович), Russian soviet painter, Honored Artist of the RSFSR (born 1918).
- June 7 — Ivan Kosmin (Russian: Космин Иван Владимирович), Russian soviet painter, Honored Art worker of the Russian Federation (born 1882).
- August 19 — Artur Fonvizyn (Russian: Фонвизин Артур Владимирович), Russian soviet watercolor artist (born 1883).
- November 7 — Dmitry Mytrokhin (Russian: Митрохин Дмитрий Исидорович), Russian soviet graphic artist, Honored Art worker of the Russian Federation (born 1883).
- November 22 — Vladimir Stozharov (Russian: Стожаров Владимир Фёдорович), Russian soviet painter, Honored Art worker of the Russian Federation (born 1926).
- December 22 — Antonina Anushina (Russian: Анушина Антонина Ивановна), Russian soviet painter, theatre artist and graphic artist (born 1904).
- December 24 — Boris Korneev (Russian: Корнеев Борис Васильевич), Russian soviet painter and graphic artist, Honored Artist of the RSFSR (born 1922).
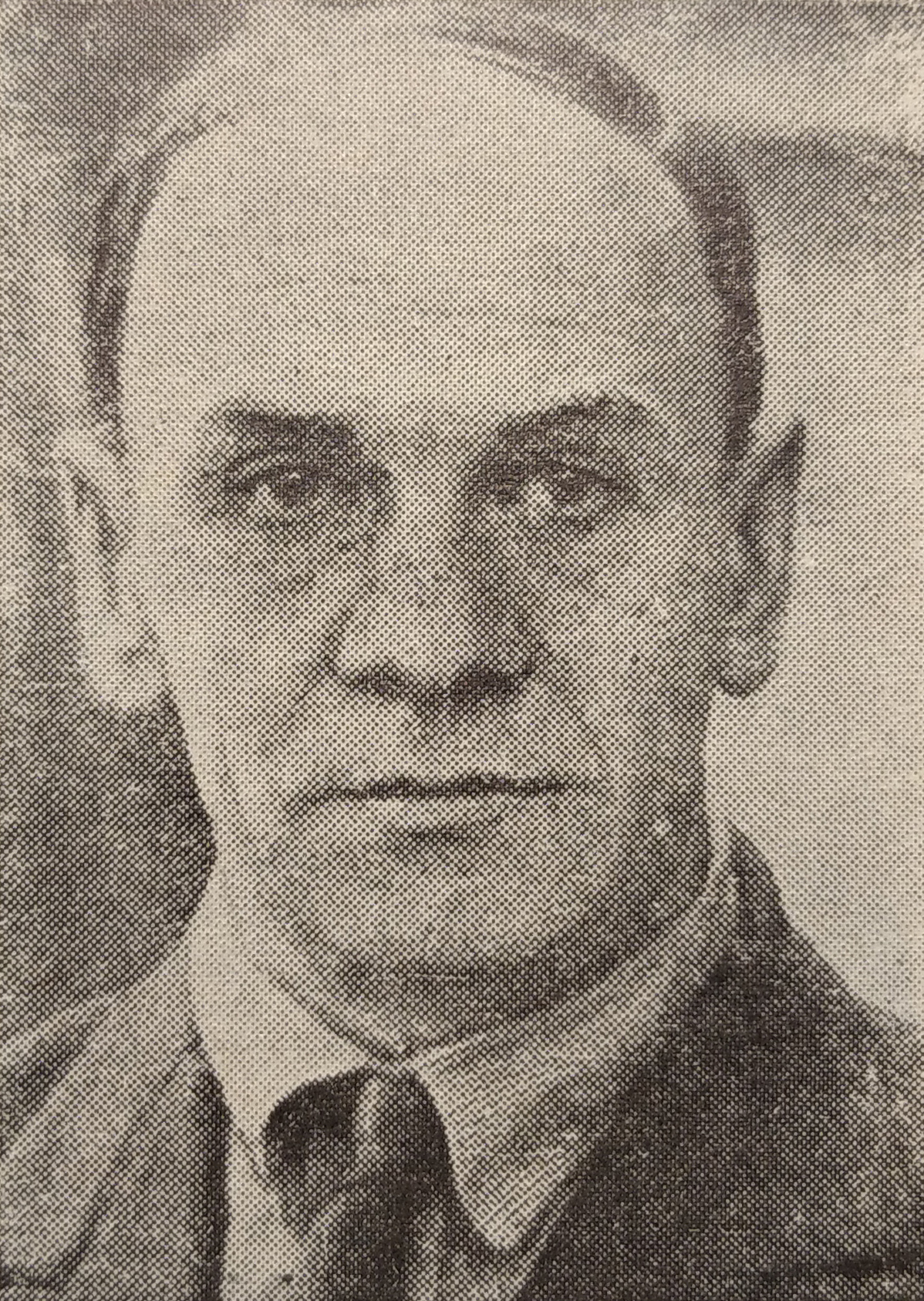
Boris Ioganson

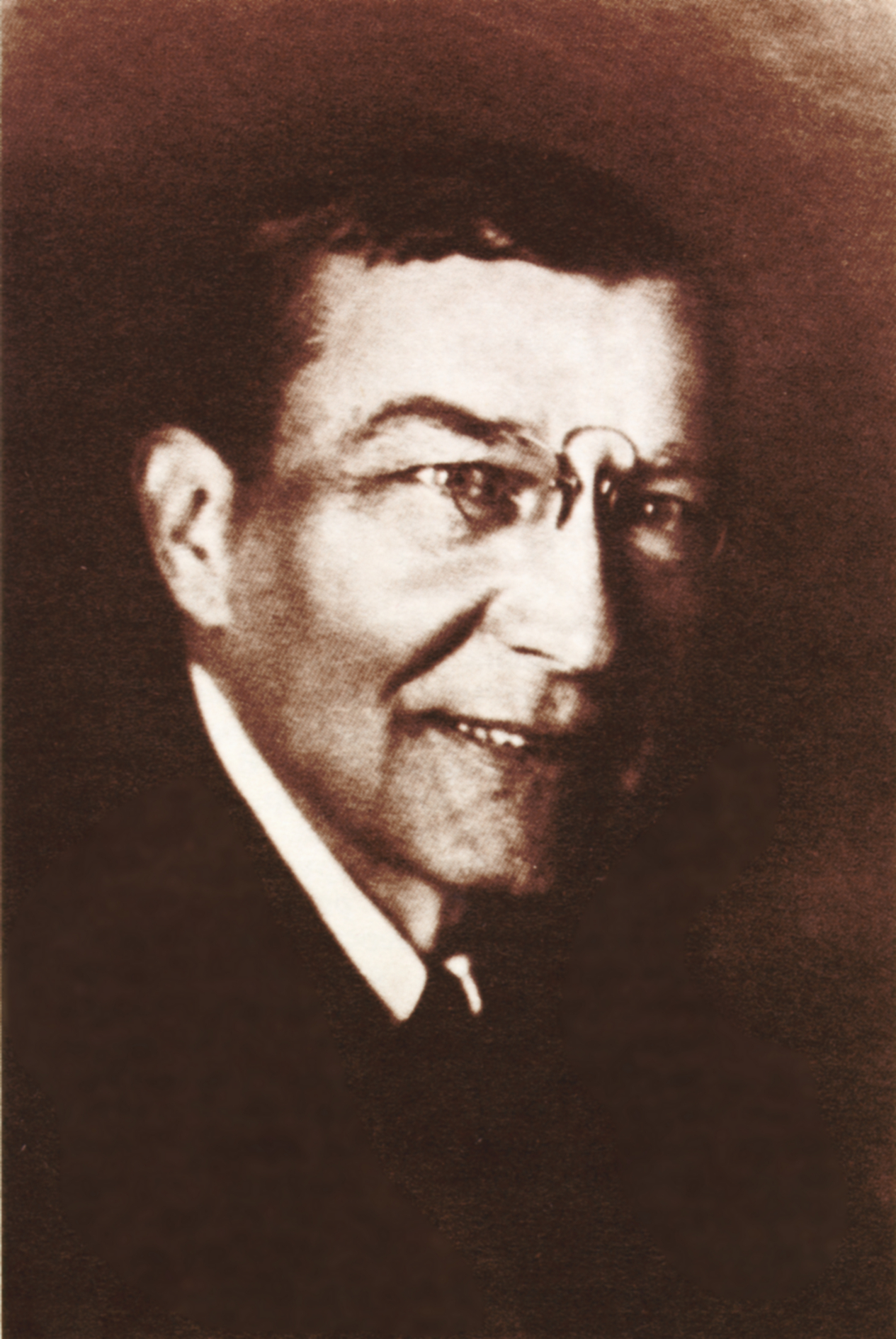
D. Mytrokhin

== See also ==
- List of Russian artists
- List of painters of Leningrad Union of Artists
- Saint Petersburg Union of Artists
- Russian culture

== Sources ==
- Рощин А. Традиционная осенняя // Ленинградская правда, 1973, 18 декабря.
- Богданов А. Ярче, но и глубже // Вечерний Ленинград, 1973, 25 декабря.
- Весенняя выставка произведений ленинградских художников. 1973 год. Каталог. — Л: Художник РСФСР, 1974.
- Осенняя выставка произведений ленинградских художников. 1973 год. Каталог. — Л: Художник РСФСР, 1976.
- Натюрморт. Выставка произведений ленинградских художников. 1973 год. Каталог. — Л: Художник РСФСР, 1973.
- «Наш современник». Третья выставка произведений ленинградских художников. 1973 год. Каталог. — Л: Художник РСФСР, 1974.
- Выставка произведений членов Академии художеств СССР. Каталог. — Москва: «Искусство», 1973.
- Exhibition of modern Soviet Painting. 1973. Gekkoso Gallery. Catalogue. — Tokyo, 1973.
- Artists of Peoples of the USSR. Biography Dictionary. Vol. 1. Moscow, Iskusstvo, 1970.
- Artists of Peoples of the USSR. Biography Dictionary. Vol. 2. Moscow, Iskusstvo, 1972.
- Directory of Members of Union of Artists of USSR. Volume 1,2. Moscow, Soviet Artist Edition, 1979.
- Directory of Members of the Leningrad branch of the Union of Artists of Russian Federation. Leningrad, Khudozhnik RSFSR, 1980.
- Artists of Peoples of the USSR. Biography Dictionary. Vol. 4 Book 1. Moscow, Iskusstvo, 1983.
- Directory of Members of the Leningrad branch of the Union of Artists of Russian Federation. - Leningrad: Khudozhnik RSFSR, 1987.
- Artists of peoples of the USSR. Biography Dictionary. Vol. 4 Book 2. - Saint Petersburg: Academic project humanitarian agency, 1995.
- Link of Times: 1932 - 1997. Artists - Members of Saint Petersburg Union of Artists of Russia. Exhibition catalogue. - Saint Petersburg: Manezh Central Exhibition Hall, 1997.
- Matthew C. Bown. Dictionary of 20th Century Russian and Soviet Painters 1900-1980s. - London: Izomar, 1998.
- Vern G. Swanson. Soviet Impressionism. - Woodbridge, England: Antique Collectors' Club, 2001.
- Время перемен. Искусство 1960—1985 в Советском Союзе. СПб., Государственный Русский музей, 2006.
- Sergei V. Ivanov. Unknown Socialist Realism. The Leningrad School. - Saint-Petersburg: NP-Print Edition, 2007. - ISBN 5-901724-21-6, ISBN 978-5-901724-21-7.
- Anniversary Directory graduates of Saint Petersburg State Academic Institute of Painting, Sculpture, and Architecture named after Ilya Repin, Russian Academy of Arts. 1915 - 2005. - Saint Petersburg: Pervotsvet Publishing House, 2007.
