= 1974 in fine arts of the Soviet Union =

The year 1974 was marked by many events that left an imprint on the history of Soviet and Russian Fine Arts.

== Events ==
- Exhibition of works of Leningrad artists devoted to 30th Anniversary of Victory under Leningrad was opened in the Leningrad Union of Artists.
- Art Exhibition named «Arkhip Kuindzhi and his pupils» was opened in the Museum of the Academy of Arts in Leningrad.
- Exhibition of works by Isaak Brodsky devoted to 90-years Anniversary was opened in the Museum of the Academy of Arts in Leningrad.
- Exhibition of works by Alexander Samokhvalov, devoted to 80-years Anniversary was opened in Leningrad in the Russian museum.
- The Spring Exhibition of works by Leningrad artists of 1974 was opened in the Leningrad Union of Artists. The participants were Veniamin Borisov, Nikolai Galakhov, Ivan Godlevsky, Irina Dobrekova, Mikhail Kozell, Engels Kozlov, Maya Kopitseva, Elena Kostenko, Gevork Kotiantz, Yaroslav Krestovsky, Vladimir Krantz, Boris Lavrenko, Ivan Lavsky, Oleg Lomakin, Vera Nazina, Mikhail Natarevich, Sergei Osipov, Nikolai Pozdneev, Vladimir Sakson, Alexander Semionov, Elena Skuin, German Tatarinov, Nikolai Timkov, Vitaly Tulenev, Alexander Shmidt, Lazar Yazgur, and other important Leningrad artists.

== Deaths ==
- April 12 — Yevgeny Vuchetich (Russian: Вучетич Евгений Викторович), Russian soviet sculptor, People's Artist of the USSR, Stalin Prize winner, Lenin Prize winner (born 1908).
- April 25 — Adrian Kaplun (Russian: Каплун Адриан Владимирович), Russian soviet painter and graphic artist, Honored Artist of the RSFSR (born 1887).
- July 12 — Yury Annenkov (Russian: Анненков Юрий Павлович), Russian painter and graphic artist, since 1924 lived in France (born 1889).
- October 28 — Eduard Krimer (Russian: Криммер Эдуард Михайлович), Russian painter, graphic artist, and theatre artist (born 1900).
- November 12 — Victor Popkov (Russian: Попков Виктор Ефимович), Russian soviet painter (born 1932).
- November 25 — Lev Muravin (Russian: Муравин Лев Давидович), Russian soviet sculptor (born 1906).
- December 27 — Nina Ivanova (Russian: Иванова Нина Александровна), Russian soviet painter (born 1919).
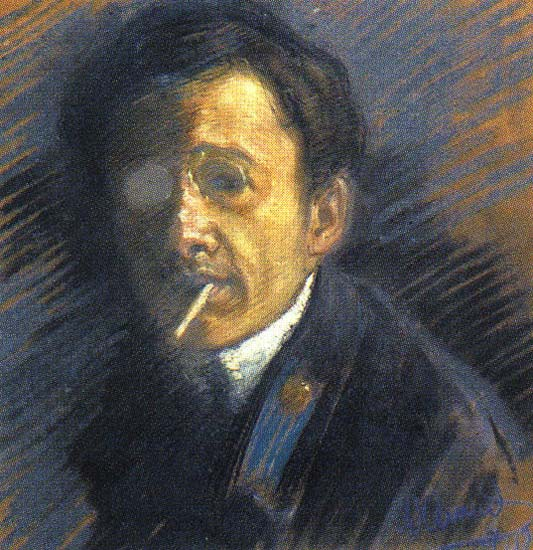
Yury Annenkov — selfportrait

== See also ==
- List of Russian artists
- List of painters of Leningrad Union of Artists
- Saint Petersburg Union of Artists
- Russian culture

== Sources ==
- Весенняя выставка произведений ленинградских художников 1974 года. Каталог. Л., Художник РСФСР, 1976.
- Андрей Яковлев. Выставка произведений. Каталог. Л., Художник РСФСР, 1974.
- Александр Николаевич Самохвалов. Каталог выставки. Л., ГРМ, 1974.
- Юрий Станиславович Подляский. Выставка произведений. Каталог. Л., Художник РСФСР, 1974.
- Орешников Виктор Михайлович. Каталог выставки произведений.. Л., Искусство, 1974.
- Бродский Исаак Израилевич. Каталог выставки произведений. К 90-летию со дня рождения. Л., Искусство, 1974.
- Виктор Иосифович Рейхет. Каталог выставки.. Л., Искусство, 1974.
- Directory of Members of Union of Artists of USSR. Volume 1,2. Moscow, Soviet Artist Edition, 1979.
- Directory of Members of the Leningrad branch of the Union of Artists of Russian Federation. Leningrad, Khudozhnik RSFSR, 1980.
- Artists of Peoples of the USSR. Biography Dictionary. Vol. 4 Book 1. Moscow, Iskusstvo, 1983.
- Directory of Members of the Leningrad branch of the Union of Artists of Russian Federation. - Leningrad: Khudozhnik RSFSR, 1987.
- Artists of peoples of the USSR. Biography Dictionary. Vol. 4 Book 2. - Saint Petersburg: Academic project humanitarian agency, 1995.
- Link of Times: 1932 - 1997. Artists - Members of Saint Petersburg Union of Artists of Russia. Exhibition catalogue. - Saint Petersburg: Manezh Central Exhibition Hall, 1997.
- Matthew C. Bown. Dictionary of 20th Century Russian and Soviet Painters 1900-1980s. - London: Izomar, 1998.
- Vern G. Swanson. Soviet Impressionism. - Woodbridge, England: Antique Collectors' Club, 2001.
- Время перемен. Искусство 1960—1985 в Советском Союзе. СПб., Государственный Русский музей, 2006.
- Sergei V. Ivanov. Unknown Socialist Realism. The Leningrad School. - Saint-Petersburg: NP-Print Edition, 2007. - ISBN 5-901724-21-6, ISBN 978-5-901724-21-7.
- Anniversary Directory graduates of Saint Petersburg State Academic Institute of Painting, Sculpture, and Architecture named after Ilya Repin, Russian Academy of Arts. 1915 - 2005. - Saint Petersburg: Pervotsvet Publishing House, 2007.
