= Nikolai Kostrov =

Russian painter

Nikolai Ivanovich Kostrov
- Born: May 19, 1901; Vasilievskoye, Vyatka Governorate, Russian Empire
- Died: April 11, 1995 (aged 93); Saint Petersburg, Russian Federation
- Education: Repin Institute of Arts
- Known for: Painting, Graphic artist
- Movement: Realism

Nikolai Ivanovich Kostrov (Russian: Никола́й Ива́нович Костро́в; May 19, 1901 – April 11, 1995) was a Russian Soviet painter, graphic artist, and illustrator, who lived and worked in Leningrad. He was a member of the Leningrad Union of Artists, and regarded as one of representatives of the Leningrad school of painting and graphics.

== Biography ==
Nikolai Ivanovich Kostrov was born May 19, 1901, in the village Vasilievskoye, Vyatka Governorate of the Russian Empire.

In 1922, Nikolai Kostrov entered at the Leningrad VKHUTEIN (The Leningrad Higher Institute of Industrial Art, before 1918 known as the High Art School under Imperial Academy of Arts), where he studied under Alexander Savinov, Alexander Karev, and Michail Matjuschin.

In 1926 Nikolai Kostrov graduated from the VKHUTEIN together with Yuri Vasnetsov, Sofia Zaklikovskaya, Pavel Kondratiev, Vasily Kuptsov, Valentin Kurdov, Kirill Kustodiev, Evgenia Magaril, Gerta Nemenova, Alexei Pochteny, George Traugot, Evgeny Charushin, and other young artists.

Since 1926 Nikolai Kostrov has participated in Art Exhibitions. He painted portraits, landscapes, still lifes, worked as easel painter, graphic artist, and art illustrator. His personal exhibitions were in Leningrad (1937, 1962, 1973, 1979), in Saint-Petersburg (1996), and in Moscow (1974, 1983), partly together with his wife and artist Anna Kostrova.

Nikolai Kostrov was a member of the Leningrad Union of Artists since 1932.

Nikolai Ivanovich Kostrov died in Saint Petersburg on April 11, 1995. His paintings and graphics reside in State Russian Museum, in the Art Museums and private collections in the Russia, Germany, France, and others.

== Bibliography ==
- Sergei V. Ivanov. Unknown Socialist Realism. The Leningrad School. Saint Petersburg, NP-Print Edition, 2007. P.244, 245, 363, 382-385, 387-391, 394, 396-398, 400, 401, 411, 413-415, 418-420, 442-444. ISBN 5-901724-21-6, ISBN 978-5-901724-21-7.
