= Yuri Belov (painter) =

Russian painter

- Born: Yuri Vladimirovich Belov; May 27, 1929; Leningrad, USSR
- Died: July 23, 2017 (aged 88)
- Education: Repin Institute of Arts
- Known for: Painting
- Movement: Realism

Yuri Vladimirovich Belov (Russian: Ю́рий Влади́мирович Бело́в; May 27, 1929 – July 23, 2017) was a Russian Soviet realist painter, who lived and worked in Saint Petersburg (former Leningrad). He was a member of the Saint Petersburg Union of Artists (named the Leningrad branch of Union of Artists of Russian Federation before 1992), and regarded by art historian Sergei V. Ivanov as one of the representatives of the Leningrad school of painting, most famous for his historical and genre paintings.

== Biography ==
Yuri Vladimirovich Belov was born May 27, 1929, in Leningrad in a family of doctors.

In 1941–1949 years Yuri Belov studied at the Leningrad Secondary Art School under the All-Russian Academy of Arts.

After graduation in 1949, Yuri Belov was adopted at the first course of Department of Painting at the Leningrad Institute of Painting, Sculpture and Architecture named after Ilya Repin, where he studied of noted educators Vladimir Serov, Piotr Belousov, Ivan Sorokin, and Ivan Stepashkin.

In 1955, Yuri Belov graduated from the Leningrad Institute of Painting, Sculpture and Architecture named after Ilya Repin in Rudolf Frentz studio, together with Piotr Litvinsky, Evgeny Maltsev, Victor Reykhet, Galina Smirnova, and other young artists. His graduation work was genre painting "A Worker-Innovator".

Since 1954 Yuri Belov has participated in Art Exhibitions. He painted portraits, still lifes, landscapes, genre scenes and historical paintings. Yuri Belov most famous for his historical paintings devoted to image of Lenin, the history of Bolshevism and Revolution movement in Russia. His personal exhibitions were in Leningrad, Moscow, Pskov, Lvov, Novgorod, Saint Petersburg, and others.

Yuri Belov is a member of the Saint Petersburg Union of Artists (before 1992 named as the Leningrad branch of Union of Artists of Russian Federation) since 1960.

Paintings by Yuri Vladimirovich Belov reside in Art Museums and private collections in Russia, France, Japan, in the U.S., and others.

== See also ==
- Leningrad School of Painting
- List of Russian artists
- List of 20th-century Russian painters
- List of painters of Saint Petersburg Union of Artists
- Saint Petersburg Union of Artists

== Bibliography ==
- Directory of Members of the Union of Artists of USSR. Volume 1.- Moscow: Soviet artist, 1979. - p. 111.
- Sergei V. Ivanov. Unknown Socialist Realism. The Leningrad School. - Saint Petersburg: NP-Print Edition, 2007. – p. 14, 174, 340, 357, 390, 392-398, 404-406, 414-419, 422, 423. ISBN 5-901724-21-6, ISBN 978-5-901724-21-7.
- Anniversary Directory graduates of Saint Petersburg State Academic Institute of Painting, Sculpture, and Architecture named after Ilya Repin, Russian Academy of Arts. 1915 - 2005. - Saint Petersburg: Pervotsvet Publishing House, 2007. - p. 73.
