= Piotr Litvinsky =

Russian painter

Piotr Petrovich Litvinsky
- Born: 7 November 1927; Leningrad, USSR
- Died: 8 July 2009 (aged 81); Moscow, Russian Federation
- Education: Tavricheskaya Art School, Repin Institute of Arts
- Known for: Painting, Art teaching
- Movement: Realism
- Awards: Honored Artist of the Russian Federation

Piotr Petrovich Litvinsky (Russian: Пё́тр Петро́вич Литви́нский; 7 November 1927 – 8 July 2009) was a Russian Soviet realist painter and art teacher, Honored Artist of the Russian Federation, who lived and worked in Saint Petersburg (former Leningrad) and Moscow. He was a member of the Saint Petersburg Union of Artists (before 1992 named as the Leningrad branch of Union of Artists of Russian Federation), and regarded as one of representatives of the Leningrad school of painting, most famous for his cityscapes and historical paintings.

== Biography ==
Piotr Petrovich Litvinsky was born on 7 November 1927 in Leningrad, USSR. His mother was a doctor, his father - a major engineer.

In the years 1943-1948 Piotr Litvinsky studied in Tavricheskaya Art School. After graduation in 1949 he entered the Department of Painting of the Leningrad Institute of Painting, Sculpture and Architecture named after Ilya Repin. There he studied under Piotr Belousov, Ivan Stepashkin, and Ivan Sorokin.

In 1955, Piotr Litvinsky graduated from the Leningrad Institute of Painting, Sculpture and Architecture as artist of painting in Rudolf Frentz workshop, together with Yuri Belov, Evgeny Maltsev, Victor Reikhet, Galina Smirnova, and other young artists. His graduated work was an historical painting named "Evpatiy Kolovrat", dedicated to Russian a warrior of the times of Mongol invasion in the 13th century, a hero of Russian epos and many literary works.

Since 1952 Piotr Litvinsky had participated in Art Exhibitions. He painted portraits, historical and genre paintings, landscapes, still lifes, and cityscapes.

Piotr Litvinsky was a member of the Leningrad Union of Artists since 1955.

Over 40 years, Piotr Litvinsky combined his creative activities with pedagogical work. He taught at the Vera Mukhina Higher School of Art and Industry (1962–1979), in the Alexander Hertzen Pedagogical Institute (1979–1984). In 1984–1986, Piotr Litvinsky taught in Vasily Surikov Institute in Moscow, then in Ilya Glazunov Academy of Arts (since 1987) .

In 1996 Piotr Litvinsky was awarded the honorary title of the Honored Artist of the Russian Federation.

Piotr Petrovich Litvinsky died in Moscow on 8 July 2009 at the eighty-second year of life. His paintings reside in Art Museums and private collections in Russia, Spain, France, in the U.S., Japan, Italy, and others.

== See also ==
- List of Russian artists
- List of 20th-century Russian painters
- List of painters of Saint Petersburg Union of Artists
- List of the Russian Landscape painters
- Saint Petersburg Union of Artists

== Bibliography ==
- Peinture Russe. Catalogue. - Paris: Drouot Richelieu, 18 Fevrier, 1991. - p. 7,59-60.
- The Still-life in painting of 1940-1990s. The Leningrad School. Exhibition catalogue. - Saint Petersburg: Nikolai Nekrasov Memorial museum, 1997. - p. 4.
- Maestros de la pintura Rusa. - Madrid: Galeria de Arte Castello 120, 1997. - p. 3,6.
- Sergei V. Ivanov. Unknown Socialist Realism. The Leningrad School. - Saint Petersburg: NP-Print Edition, 2007. – pp. 263, 337, 364, 389, 391–394, 401, 404, 405, 414–416, 420, 422, 443. ISBN 5-901724-21-6, ISBN 978-5-901724-21-7.
