= Tatiana Gorb =

Russian painter

Tatiana Vladimirovna Gorb
- Born: 27 April 1935; Leningrad, USSR
- Died: 2013 (aged 77–78); Saint Petersburg
- Education: Repin Institute of Arts
- Known for: Painting, Graphics, Art education
- Movement: Realism

Tatiana Vladimirovna Gorb (Russian: Татья́на Влади́мировна Го́рб; 27 April 1935 – 2013) was a Soviet Russian painter, graphic artist, art teacher and illustrator, who lived and worked in Saint Petersburg (formerly Leningrad). Gorb was a member of the Saint Petersburg Union of Artists (before 1992, Leningrad branch of Union of Artists of Russian Federation) and is regarded as one of the representatives of the Leningrad school of painting. She is most famous for her portraits.

== Biography ==
Tatiana Vladimirovna Gorb was born on 27 April 1935 in Leningrad, USSR, into an artistic family. Her father, Vladimir Gorb, was a painter and taught at the Ilya Repin Leningrad Institute for Painting, Sculpture and Architecture.

In 1954, Tatiana Gorb joined the drawings department of the Repin Institute of Arts, where she studied under her father, Alexander Troshichev, Alexander Zaytsev, and Leonid Ovsannikov. In 1961, Gorb graduated from Ilya Repin Institute in Mikhail Taranov's personal art studio. Her graduation work was a design for a novel by Erich Maria Remarque, Three Comrades.

Tatiana Gorb participated in Art Exhibitions starting in 1965. She painted portraits, genre compositions, landscapes, and still lifes. Tatiana Gorb worked in the techniques of oil painting, watercolors, and graphics for print.

Gorb's painting style formed under the influence of the personality and creativity of her father, Vladimir Gorb, a famous Leningrad portrait artist and art teacher, and a professor at the Repin Institute. Her painting style is distinguished by its use of restrained color, the richness of tonal relations, and light and shadow modulations.

In 1970, Gorb became a member of Saint Petersburg Union of Artists (before 1992, the Leningrad branch of Union of Artists of Russian Federation) since 1970. Gorb spent more than 25 years teaching art at the Secondary Art School of Russian Academy of Arts, where she began work in 1985.

Tatiana Vladimirovna Gorb died in 2013 in Saint Petersburg. Her paintings reside in art museums and private collections in Russia, France, Germany, the United States, and England, among other countries.

== Bibliography ==
- Directory of Members of the Union of Artists of USSR. Volume 1.- Moscow: Soviet artist, 1979. - p. 266.
- Directory of members of the Leningrad branch of Union of Artists of Russian Federation. - Leningrad: Khudozhnik RSFSR, 1987. - p. 31.
- Matthew C. Bown. Dictionary of 20th Century Russian and Soviet Painters 1900-1980s. - London: Izomar, 1998. ISBN 0-9532061-0-6, ISBN 978-0-9532061-0-0.
- Sergei V. Ivanov. Unknown Socialist Realism. The Leningrad School. - Saint Petersburg: NP-Print Edition, 2007. – pp. 4, 207, 360, 397, 398, 405–407. ISBN 5-901724-21-6, ISBN 978-5-901724-21-7.
- Anniversary Directory graduates of Saint Petersburg State Academic Institute of Painting, Sculpture, and Architecture named after Ilya Repin, Russian Academy of Arts. 1915 - 2005. - Saint Petersburg: Pervotsvet Publishing House, 2007. p. 390.
