= Ivan Varichev =

Russian painter

Ivan Mikhailovich Varichev
- Born: 15 January 1924; Nizhnaya Loshikha, Russian SFSR, Soviet Union
- Died: 7 June 2016 (aged 92)
- Education: Repin Institute of Arts
- Known for: Painting
- Movement: Realism
- Awards: Order of the Patriotic War; Order of Glory; Honored Artist of the RSFSR; People's Artist of the Russian Federation

Ivan Mikhailovich Varichev (Russian: Ива́н Миха́йлович Ва́ричев; 15 January 1924 – 7 June 2016) Russian Soviet realist painter, People's Artist of the Russian Federation, who lived and worked in Saint Petersburg (formerly Leningrad). He was a member of the Saint Petersburg Union of Artists (before 1992 named as the Leningrad branch of Union of Artists of Russian Federation), regarded as one of the brightest representatives of the Leningrad school of painting, most famous for his lyrical landscape of rural Russia.

== Biography ==
Ivan Mikhailovich Varichev was born on 15 January 1924 in the village of Nizhnaya Loshikha, Smolensk Province of the USSR.

In 1942, Ivan Varichev was drafted into the Red Army and took part in the German-Soviet War, which led the Soviet people against Nazi Germany and its allies. As a soldier and gunner he fought on the Leningrad Front, then on the Soviet Far East against Japan. He was wounded and marked by military awards.

After demobilization Ivan Varichev entered at the Tavricheskaya Art School in Leningrad, which he graduated in 1951. After graduation Ivan Varichev was adopted at the first course of Department of Painting at the Leningrad Institute of Painting, Sculpture and Architecture named after Ilya Repin, where he studied of Ivan Stepashkin, Vitaly Valtsev, Piotr Belousov.

In 1957, Ivan Varichev graduated from the Leningrad Institute of Painting, Sculpture and Architecture named after Ilya Repin in Yuri Neprintsev studio, together with Galina Rumiantseva, Zlata Bizova, Ilya Glazunov, Elena Gorokhova, Vladimir Malevsky, Dmitry Oboznenko, Vladimir Proshkin, and other young artists. His graduation work was genre painting "The Return from mowing"

Since 1957 Ivan Varichev has participated in Art Exhibitions. He painted landscapes, genre paintings, and sketches from the life. He is most famous for etudes done from nature and lyrical landscapes of rural Russia.

Ivan Varichev became a member of the Leningrad Union of Artists in 1960.

Ivan Varichev was awarded the honorary titles of the Honored Artist of the Russian Federation (1983), and the People's Artist of the Russian Federation (2005).

Paintings by Ivan Varichev reside in State Russian Museum, State Tretyakov Gallery, in art museums and private collections in Russia, Japan, China, England, in the US, France, and others.

== Honours and awards ==
- Order of the Patriotic War, 1st class
- Order of Glory
- Medal "For Courage", twice
- Medal "For the Victory over Germany in the Great Patriotic War 1941–1945"
- Medal "For the Defence of Leningrad"

== Sources ==
- Artists of the peoples of the USSR. Biography and Bibliography Dictionary. Volume 2. - Moscow: Iskusstvo Edition, 1972. - p. 168.
- Saint-Pétersbourg - Pont-Audemer. Dessins, Gravures, Sculptures et Tableaux du XX siècle du fonds de L' Union des Artistes de Saint-Pétersbourg. - Pont-Audemer: 1994. - pp. 87, 101.
- Matthew C. Bown. Dictionary of 20th Century Russian and Soviet Painters 1900-1980s. - London: Izomar, 1998. ISBN 0-9532061-0-6, ISBN 978-0-9532061-0-0.
- Time for change. The Art of 1960-1985 in the Soviet Union. - Saint Petersburg: State Russian Museum, 2006. - p. 164.
- Irina Romanycheva. Academic Dacha. History and traditions. - Saint Petersburg: Petropol Publishing House, 2009. - pp. 136–137.
- Sergei V. Ivanov. Unknown Socialist Realism. The Leningrad School. - Saint Petersburg: NP-Print Edition, 2007. – pp. 9, 18, 29, 284, 358, 391-396, 399, 401-404, 406, 407, 415-419, 421-424. ISBN 5-901724-21-6, ISBN 978-5-901724-21-7.
- Artists of Peter's Academy of Arts and Sciences. - Saint Petersburg: Ladoga Edition, 2008. - pp. 36–37.
