= Ivan Savenko =

Soviet painter, Honored Artist of the RSFSR

Ivan Grigorievich Savenko
- Born: 17 January 1924; Varvarovka, Chernigov Province, Ukraine, USSR
- Died: 17 December 1987 (aged 63); Leningrad, USSR
- Education: Repin Institute of Arts
- Known for: Painting
- Movement: Realism
- Awards: Honored Artist of the RSFSR

Ivan Grigorievich Savenko (Russian: Ива́н Григо́рьевич Саве́нко; 17 January 1924 – 17 December 1987) was a Soviet painter, Honored Artist of the RSFSR, lived and worked in Leningrad, regarded as one of representatives of the Leningrad school of painting, most famous for his landscape paintings.

== Biography ==
Ivan Savenko was born on 17 January 1924 in Varvarovka village, Chernigov Province, Ukraine, USSR. He was a veteran of World War II, was wounded and lost his right hand, he had many military orders.

In 1950, Savenko graduated from Kiev Art Institute in Grigory Svetlitsky personal art studio.

In 1950–1954, Savenko studied as post-graduate student in Ilya Repin Institute in Aleksandr Gerasimov art studio. Master of Art-criticism (1954). Honored Artist of the Russian Federation (1975).

Since 1950, Savenko has participated in art exhibitions. He painted landscapes, portraits, genre scenes, sketches from the life. Personal exhibition in Moscow (1990).

Savenko was a member of Leningrad Union of Artists since 1952.

Savenko died on 17 December 1987 in Leningrad. His paintings reside in State Russian Museum, State Tretyakov Gallery, in art museums and private collections in Russia, France, Ukraine, Germany, Japan, Italy, England, and throughout the world.

== Bibliography ==
- Directory of members of the Leningrad branch of Union of Artists of Russian Federation. - Leningrad: Khudozhnik RSFSR, 1987. - p. 114.
- Saint-Pétersbourg - Pont-Audemer. Dessins, Gravures, Sculptures et Tableaux du XX siècle du fonds de L' Union des Artistes de Saint-Pétersbourg. - Pont-Audemer: 1994. - p. 92.
- Matthew C. Bown. Dictionary of 20th Century Russian and Soviet Painters 1900-1980s. - London: Izomar, 1998. ISBN 0-9532061-0-6, ISBN 978-0-9532061-0-0.
