= Anna Kostrova =

Russian artist (1909–1994)

Anna Alexandrovna Kostrova
- Born: 22 November 1909 village Belostok, Omsk Province, Russian Empire
- Died: 7 July 1994 (aged 84); Saint Petersburg, USSR
- Known for: Painting, Graphics
- Movement: Realism

Anna Alexandrovna Kostrova (Russian: А́нна Алекса́ндровна Костро́ва; 22 November 1909 – 7 July 1994) was a Russian Soviet realist painter, graphic artist and book illustrator, who lived and worked in Leningrad. She was a member of the Leningrad Union of Artists, regarded as a representative of the Leningrad school of painting.

== Biography ==
Anna Alexandrovna Kostrova was born on 22 November 1909 in the village Belostok, Omsk Province, West Siberia.

In 1925 Anna Kostrova enrolled at the Omsk School of Industrial Art, where she studied with V. Trofimov and S. Feldman. In 1928 Anna Kostrova graduated from the School of Industrial Art in Omsk.

In 1930 Anna Kostrova moved to Leningrad. From 1934 she participated in Art Exhibitions. Anna Kostrova painted portraits, landscapes, still lifes, worked as easel painter, graphic artist and art illustrator. Her personal exhibitions were in Leningrad (1973, 1977, 1979) and in Moscow (1974, 1983).

In 1930s Anna Kostrova was travelling with her husband, artist Nikolai Kostrov on the White Sea and Barents Sea, the Crimea, Ukraine and Novgorod, during which painted a lot from life.

In 1940, Anna Kostrova was admitted to the Leningrad Union of Artists.

In 1950–1970 years, Anna Kostrova illustrated children's books for the largest publishing houses in Moscow and Leningrad. Together with Nikolai Kostrov she travelled to Armenia, Norway, according to the ancient cities of Vologda and Vladimir-Suzdal land, cruise on the Danube. Impressions from these trips have become material for numerous works of graphics and painting.

Kostrova Anna Alexandrovna died in Saint Petersburg in 1994. Paintings and graphics by Anna Kostrova reside in the State Russian Museum, in Art Museums and private collections in Russia, Germany, Finland and others.

== Sources ==
- Exhibition of works by Leningrad artists of 1951. Exhibition Catalogue. - Leningrad: Lenizdat Edition, 1951. - p. 43.
- Spring Exhibition of works by Leningrad artists of 1954. Exhibition Catalogue. - Leningrad: Izogiz Edition, 1954. - p. 41.
- Spring Exhibition of works by Leningrad artists of 1955. Catalogue. - Leningrad: Leningrad Union of Artists, 1956. - p. 29.
- Spring Exhibition of works by Leningrad artists of 1956. Catalogue. - Leningrad: Leningrad Union of Artists, 1956.
- Autumn Exhibition of works by Leningrad artists of 1956. Exhibition Catalogue. - Leningrad: Leningrad Union of Artists Edition, 1958. - p. 50.
- 1917 - 1957. Exhibition of works by Leningrad artists of 1957. Exhibition Catalogue. - Leningrad: Khudozhnik RSFSR, 1958. - p. 63.
- Autumn Exhibition of works by Leningrad artists of 1958. Exhibition Catalogue. - Leningrad: Khudozhnik RSFSR, 1959. - p. 44.
- Exhibition of works by Leningrad artists of 1960. Exhibition catalogue. - Leningrad: Khudozhnik RSFSR, 1963. - p. 31.
- Exhibition of works by Leningrad artists of 1960. Exhibition catalogue. - Leningrad: Khudozhnik RSFSR, 1961. - p. 81.
- Exhibition of works by Leningrad artists of 1961. Exhibition catalogue. - Leningrad: Khudozhnik RSFSR, 1964. - p. 79.
- The Leningrad Fine Arts Exhibition. - Leningrad: Khudozhnik RSFSR, 1965. - p. 103.
- Autumn Exhibition of works by Leningrad artists of 1968. Catalogue. - Leningrad: Khudozhnik RSFSR, 1971. - p. 32.
- Art works by Russian Federation Artists grants to Museums and Culture Institutions (1963 - 1971). Official Catalogue. - Moscow: Russian Federation Union of Artists, 1972. - p. 216.
- Our Contemporary Exhibition catalogue of works by Leningrad artists of 1971. - Leningrad: Khudozhnik RSFSR, 1972. - p. 43.
- The Still-Life. Exhibition of works by Leningrad artists. Exhibition catalogue. - Leningrad: Khudozhnik RSFSR, 1973. - p. 10.
- Exhibitions of Soviet art. Directory. Volume 3. 1941 - 1947. - Moscow: Soviet Artist, 1973. - pp. 25, 85, 86, 132, 214, 340, 342.
- Across the Motherland Exhibition of Leningrad artists. Catalogue. - Leningrad: Khudozhnik RSFSR, 1974. - p. 50.
- Our Contemporary The Second Exhibition of works by Leningrad artists of 1972. Catalogue. - Leningrad: Khudozhnik RSFSR, 1973. - p. 14.
- Our Contemporary regional exhibition of Leningrad artists of 1975. Catalogue. - Leningrad: Khudozhnik RSFSR, 1980. - p. 45.
- Soviet Russia the Fifth Republic Exhibition of 1975. Exhibition catalogue. - Moscow: Soviet Artist, 1975. - p. 77.
- The Fine Arts of Leningrad. Exhibition catalogue. - Leningrad: Khudozhnik RSFSR, 1976. - p. 177.
- The Portrait of Contemporary the fifth exhibition of works by Leningrad artists of 1976. Catalogue. - Leningrad: Khudozhnik RSFSR, 1983. - p. 42.
- Exhibition of works by Leningrad artists dedicated to the 60th Anniversary of October Revolution. Catalogue. - Leningrad: Khudozhnik RSFSR, 1982. - p. 41.
- Autumn Exhibition of works by Leningrad artists of 1978. Exhibition Catalogue. - Leningrad: Khudozhnik RSFSR, 1983. - p. 44.
- Anna Kostrova. Catalogue of exhibition of works. - Leningrad: Khudozhnik RSFSR, 1979. - 28 p.
- Directory of members of the Union of Artists of USSR. Volume 1. - Moscow: Soviet artist, 1979. - p. 549.
- Exhibitions of Soviet art. Directory. Volume 5. 1954 - 1958. - Moscow: Soviet Artist, 1981. - pp. 25, 27, 141, 142, 259, 261, 386, 545, 548, 552, 636.
- Anna Kostrova, Nikolai Kostrov. Drawings. Exhibition catalogue. - Moscow: Soviet Artist, 1983. - 40 p.
- Exhibition of works by Leningrad artists dedicated to the 40th Anniversary of the complete liberation of Leningrad from the enemy blockade. - Leningrad: Khudozhnik RSFSR, 1989. - p. 27.
- Directory of members of the Leningrad branch of Union of Artists of Russian Federation. - Leningrad: Khudozhnik RSFSR, 1987. - p. 63.
- Link of Times: 1932 - 1997. Artists - Members of Saint - Petersburg Union of Artists of Russia. Exhibition catalogue. - Saint - Petersburg: Manezh Central Exhibition Hall, 1997. - p. 251.
- Sergei V. Ivanov. Unknown Socialist Realism. The Leningrad School. Saint Petersburg, NP-Print Edition, 2007. P.385, 387–389, 400, 443, 444. ISBN 5-901724-21-6, ISBN 978-5-901724-21-7.
