= Igor Veselkin =

Russian painter

Igor Petrovich Veselkin
- Born: 8 March 1915; Ranenburg, Ryazan Governorate, Russian Empire
- Died: 1997 (aged 81–82); Saint Petersburg, Russian Federation
- Education: Repin Institute of Arts
- Known for: Painting, Scenography
- Movement: Realism

Igor Petrovich Veselkin (Russian: И́горь Петро́вич Весё́лкин; 8 March 1915 – 1997) was a Russian Soviet realist painter, graphic artist, scenographer, stage designer, and art teacher, professor of the Repin Institute of Arts, who lived and worked in Saint Petersburg (former Leningrad). He was a member of the Saint Petersburg Union of Artists (before 1992 named as the Leningrad branch of Union of Artists of Russian Federation), and regarded as one of the representatives of the Leningrad school of painting.

== Biography ==
Veselkin Igor Petrovich was born on 8 March 1915 in the town of Ranenburg, Ryazan Governorate.

In 1930 Igor Veselkin entered the Ryazan Art College, from which he graduated in 1934. In 1936 he moved to Leningrad and entered the Leningrad Institute of Painting, Sculpture and Architecture, where he studied under noted educators Alexander Debler, Boris Fogel, Alexander Segal, and Mikhail Platunov.

In 1947 Veselkin graduated from the Repin Institute of Arts in Mikhail Bobishov workshop. His graduated work was design of the play "The Kremlin chimes" (by the same name play of Nikolai Pogodin), award-winning Art Fund of the USSR.

After graduating in the 1947–1951 years, Igor Veselkin had continued his postgraduate studies in the Repin Institute of Arts. In 1951 he was awarded the academic degree of Doctor of art-criticism.

Beginning in 1947, Igor Veselkin worked as a theatre decorator in Leningrad and Moscow theaters for the following plays: "We are on the ground", (Olga Bergholz and George Makogonenko, Leningrad BDT Theatre named after Maxim Gorky, 1948), "Ilya Golovin" (Sergey Mikhalkov, Moscow Art Theatre named after Maxim Gorky, 1949), "Philistines" (Maxim Gorky, Moscow Art Theatre, 1950), "Summerfolk" (Maxim Gorky, Moscow Art Theatre, 1951), "Native Fields" (Leningrad Opera and Ballet Theatre named after Sergei Kirov, 1953).

From 1946, Igor Veselkin participated in art exhibitions. He painted portraits, landscapes, still lifes, genre paintings, sketches of theatre costumes and set-scenes for Moscow and Leningrad theatres. In 1947 Igor Veselkin was admitted to the Leningrad Union of Soviet Artists (since 1992 known as the Saint Petersburg Union of Artists).

In 1951, Igor Veselkin began teaching painting and drawing, first in the Institute of Applied and Decorative Arts in Moscow, then in Higher School of Industrial Art named after Vera Mukhina in Leningrad, and in the Repin Institute of Arts., where he was professor of painting after 1989.

Veselkin Igor Petrovich died in Saint Petersburg in 1997. Paintings by Igor Veselkin reside in State Russian Museum, in art museums and private collections in Russia, Germany, France, and throughout the world.

== See also ==
- Leningrad School of Painting
- List of Russian artists
- List of 20th-century Russian painters
- List of painters of Saint Petersburg Union of Artists
- Saint Petersburg Union of Artists

== Sources ==
- Artists of the peoples of the USSR. Biography and Bibliography Dictionary. Vol. 2. - Moscow: Iskusstvo Edition, 1972. - p. 248.
- Directory of members of the Leningrad branch of Union of Artists of Russian Federation. - Leningrad: Khudozhnik RSFSR, 1987. - p. 24.
- Charmes Russes. Auction Catalogue. — Paris: Drouot Richelieu, 15 Mai 1991. — p. 19-20.
- Sergei V. Ivanov. Unknown Socialist Realism. The Leningrad School. - Saint Petersburg: NP-Print Edition, 2007. – pp. 9, 18, 26, 29, 52, 230, 257, 261, 358, 388, 390-400, 402-405, 413, 415, 416, 418-422. ISBN 5-901724-21-6, ISBN 978-5-901724-21-7.
- Anniversary Directory graduates of Saint Petersburg State Academic Institute of Painting, Sculpture, and Architecture named after Ilya Repin, Russian Academy of Arts. 1915 - 2005. - Saint Petersburg: Pervotsvet Publishing House, 2007.- p. 57. ISBN 978-5-903677-01-6.
