= Nikolai Mukho =

Russian painter

Nikolai Antonovich Mukho
- Born: December 6, 1913; Kronstadt, Saint Petersburg Governorate, Russian Empire
- Died: August 6, 1986 (aged 72); Leningrad, USSR
- Education: Repin Institute of Arts
- Known for: Painting
- Movement: Realism

Nikolai Antonovich Mukho (Russian: Никола́й Анто́нович Мухо́; December 6, 1913 – August 6, 1986) was a Soviet, Russian painter who lived and worked in Leningrad, and was regarded as a representative of the Leningrad school of painting. He was best known for his portraits.

== Biography ==
Mukho was born December 6, 1913, in Kronstadt, a seaport on Kotlin Island, 30 kilometers west of Saint Petersburg near the head of the Gulf of Finland.

From 1934–1940, he studied at Tavricheskaya Art School in Leningrad. After graduating in 1940, he entered the painting department of the Leningrad Institute of Painting, Sculpture and Architecture.

In August 1941, he was drafted into the Red Army and served in World War II, participating in the defense of Leningrad. After being wounded and demobilized in late 1943, he returned to the institute, where he studied with Mikhail Bernshtein, Semion Abugov, Alexander Zaytsev, Genrikh Pavlovsky, and Gleb Savinov.

In 1950 graduated from the institute. His graduation work was a genre painting, "The Leningrad Metro", dedicated to the builders of Leningrad's subway (whose first stations were opened in 1950).

From 1951 on, Mukho participated in art exhibitions, creating portraits, genre and historical compositions, seascapes, landscapes, and sketches from his life. In 1957 he was admitted to the Leningrad Union of Artists. He has a solo exhibition in Leningrad in 1989.

Mukho's work often portrayed the sea and the life of coastal cities. He worked in Yuzhno-Sakhalinsk, Murmansk, Sevastopol, Kronstadt, on the Northern Dvina. His work is distinguished by decorative, bright saturated colors, solid vigorously.

Mukho died on August 6, 1986, in Leningrad. His paintings are in art museums and private collections in Russia, France, England, the United States, Japan, and other countries.

== See also ==
- Leningrad School of Painting
- List of painters of Saint Petersburg Union of Artists
- List of the Russian Landscape painters
- Saint Petersburg Union of Artists

== Bibliography ==
- Directory of members of the Leningrad branch of Union of Artists of Russian Federation. - Leningrad: Khudozhnik RSFSR, 1980. - p. 82.
- Sergei V. Ivanov. Unknown Socialist Realism. The Leningrad School. - Saint Petersburg: NP-Print Edition, 2007. – pp. 18, 27, 29, 156, 308, 365, 387, 388, 390, 391, 393-396, 398, 400, 403, 413-417, 419-422, 445. ISBN 5-901724-21-6, ISBN 978-5-901724-21-7.
- Anniversary Directory graduates of Saint Petersburg State Academic Institute of Painting, Sculpture, and Architecture named after Ilya Repin, Russian Academy of Arts. 1915–2005. - Saint Petersburg: Pervotsvet Publishing House, 2007. p. 63.
