= Vladimir Krantz =

Russian painter

Vladimir Pavlovich Krantz
- Born: February 17, 1913; Mozdok, North Caucasus, Russian Empire
- Died: July 20, 2003 (aged 90); Saint Petersburg
- Education: Leningrad Civil Engineering Institute
- Known for: Painting
- Movement: Realism

Vladimir Pavlovich Krantz (Russian: Влади́мир Па́влович Кра́нц; February 17, 1913 – July 20, 2003) was a Soviet Russian painter who lived and worked in Leningrad - Saint Petersburg and is regarded as one of the representatives of the Leningrad school of painting. He is most famous for his lyrical landscape paintings.

== Biography ==
Vladimir Pavlovich Krantz was born February 17, 1913, in Mozdok, North Caucasus. His mother's origin was Cossack, and his father came from nobility. His ancestor, German-born Von Rosen Krantz, was sent in exile to the Caucasus after the December uprising in Petersburg in 1825.

In 1935 Vladimir Krantz entered the Architectural department of Leningrad Civil Engineering Institute, which he graduated in 1940. After graduating he worked as an artist-decorator, and painted in oils independently.

In 1941 Krantz was drafted into the Red Army and took part in the second world war of the Soviet people against Nazi Germany and its allies.

After the war, Krantz returned to his work in the Painting and Design Group of Enterprises in Leningrad and perfected his art at the studio of the known Leningrad artist and art educator Samuil Nevelshtein.

Since 1957 Vladimir Krantz had participated in art exhibitions. He painted a lot in suburbs of Leningrad and in the ancient Russian town of Staraja Ladoga in the Leningrad Region. Vladimir Krantz painted landscapes, cityscapes, genre and still-life paintings. In the 1970s his art was recognized by the public. The Japanese collector Yoko Nakamura acquired a series of his landscapes, and the artist became well known abroad.

Krantz painted the modest beauty of Northern Russia and seascapes in the Crimea, working at the Academic Dacha in Tver province. There he became better acquainted with many famous artists. This broadened his artistic horizons and enrich the technical arsenal. Among them were well-known masters of landscape painting Nikolai Timkov, Dmitry Maevsky, Ivan Varichev, Vladimir Ovchinnikov, and Vecheslav Zagonek.

As a master of lyrical landscapes, Krantz considered nature as his main teacher. He preferred painting ala prima, finishing his landscape in one session. He never went down to the rough naturalism or unwarranted detailing both in drawing and coloring.

Krantz was a member of the Saint Petersburg Union of Artists (before 1992 named as the Leningrad branch of Union of Artists of Russian Federation) since 1972. His personal exhibitions were in Leningrad in 1964, 1977, and 1991, and in Saint Petersburg in 1992, 1995, and in 2002.

Vladimir Pavlovich Krantz died in Saint Petersburg on July 20, 2003. His paintings reside in art museums and private collections in Russia, Japan, the United States, Germany, and throughout the world.

== See also ==
- Leningrad School of Painting
- List of 20th-century Russian painters
- List of painters of Saint Petersburg Union of Artists
- List of the Russian Landscape painters
- Saint Petersburg Union of Artists

== Sources ==
- Matthew C. Bown. Dictionary of 20th Century Russian and Soviet Painters 1900-1980s. - London: Izomar, 1998. ISBN 0-9532061-0-6, ISBN 978-0-9532061-0-0.
- Vladimir Pavlovich Krantz. - Saint Petersburg: Aurora-Designe, 2001. - 72 p.
- Vladimir Pavlovich Krantz. - Saint Petersburg: Iskusstvo Rossii, 2002. - 55 p.
- Sergei V. Ivanov. Unknown Socialist Realism. The Leningrad School.- Saint Petersburg: NP-Print Edition, 2007. – pp. 363, 393, 395-400, 404-407, 439, 446. ISBN 5-901724-21-6, ISBN 978-5-901724-21-7.
