= Ruben Zakharian =

Russian painter

Ruben Agasievich Zakharian
- Born: 14 July 1901; Tiflis, Russian Empire
- Died: 25 May 1992 (aged 90); Saint Petersburg, Russian Federation
- Education: Repin Institute of Arts
- Known for: Painting
- Movement: Realism

Ruben Agasievich Zakharian (Russian: Рубе́н Ага́сиевич Захарья́н, 14 July 1901 – 25 May 1992) was a Russian painter, who lived and worked in Leningrad. He was a member of the Leningrad Union of Artists, and regarded as one of the representatives of the Leningrad School of Painting.

== Early life and education ==
Ruben Agasievich Zakharian was born on 14 July 1901 in Tiflis, Russia Empire.

In 1921 Ruben Zakharian entered in Tiflis drawing school (since 1922 – Tbilisi Academy of Arts), where he studied of Evgeny Lansere and Boris Fogel.

In 1923 he moved to Petrograd to continue art education in VKHUTEIN (The Leningrad Higher Institute of Industrial Art, formerly known as the High Art School under Imperial Academy of Arts; since 1944 known as the Repin Institute of Arts), where he studied under Kuzma Petrov-Vodkin and Alexander Karev.

In 1927 Ruben Zakharian graduated from the Leningrad Vkhutein. His graduation work was painting "Athletes".

== Career ==
Since 1926 Ruben Zakharian has participated in art exhibitions. He painted portraits, landscapes, still lifes, sketches from the life. His personal exhibitions were in Leningrad in 1974, and in 1983.

In 1939 Ruben Zakharian was drafted into the Red Army and took part in the Winter War, and in the Great Patriotic War of the Soviet people against Nazi Germany and its allies. As a soldier he fought on the Leningrad Front. He was wounded and marked by military awards.

After demobilization in 1945, Ruben Zakharian gradually restoring skills. This is facilitated by extensive travels and hard work from nature.

In 1951 Ruben Zakharian has become a member of Leningrad Union of Artists.

In 1950–1970 years Ruben Zakharian has repeatedly visited the Caucasus and Black Sea, works in Gurzuf, at the Staraya Ladoga and Academic Dacha. In last years the artist has worked lot in the genre of decorative still life.

Ruben Agasievich Zakharian died in Saint-Petersburg on May 25, 1992. His paintings reside in Art museums and private collections in the Russia, Japan, France, in the U.S., Armenia, and other countries.

== See also ==
- List of Russian artists
- List of 20th-century Russian painters
- List of painters of Saint Petersburg Union of Artists

== Sources ==
- Artists of the USSR. Biography and Bibliography Dictionary. Volume 4, part 1. - Moscow: Iskusstvo, 1983. - p. 258.
- Directory of members of the Leningrad branch of Union of Artists of Russian Federation. - Leningrad: Khudozhnik RSFSR, 1987. - p. 47.
- Sots'Art a St Petersbourg. Catalogue. - St Germain en Laye: 23 Fevrier 1992. - p. 7.
- Matthew C. Bown. Dictionary of 20th Century Russian and Soviet Painters 1900-1980s. - London: Izomar, 1998. ISBN 0-9532061-0-6, ISBN 978-0-9532061-0-0.
- Sergei V. Ivanov. Unknown Socialist Realism. The Leningrad School. - Saint Petersburg: NP-Print Edition, 2007. – pp. 27, 81, 202, 361, 384, 385, 388–392, 394–397, 402–405, 413–422, 444. ISBN 5-901724-21-6, ISBN 978-5-901724-21-7.
