= Boris Shamanov =

Russian painter

Boris Ivanovich Shamanov
- Born: September 15, 1931; Leningrad, USSR
- Died: March 1, 2008 (aged 76); Saint Petersburg, Russian Federation
- Education: Vera Mukhina Institute
- Known for: Painting, Graphics
- Movement: Realism
- Awards: Honored Artist of the RSFSR, People's Artist of the Russian Federation

Boris Ivanovich Shamanov (Russian: Бори́с Ива́нович Шама́нов; September 15, 1931 – March 1, 2008) was a Soviet Russian realist painter, graphic artist, and art teacher, People's Artist of the Russian Federation, who lived and worked in Saint Petersburg. He was a member of the Saint Petersburg Union of Artists (before 1992 named as the Leningrad branch of Union of Artists of Russian Federation), and regarded as one of the representatives of the Leningrad school of painting.

== Biography ==
Boris Ivanovich Shamanov was born September 15, 1931, in Leningrad, USSR.

In 1948, Boris Shamanov entered at the first course of the department of monumental painting of the Leningrad Higher School of Art and Industry. Boris Shamanov studied of Piotr Buchkin, Alexei Sokolov, Sergei Petrov, Kirill Iogansen.

In 1956 Boris Shamanov graduated in the Alexander Kazantsev workshop.

Since 1957 Boris Shamanov has participated in art exhibitions. He painted portraits, still lifes with flowers in exterior, genre scenes, and landscapes. Boris Shamanov worked in oils, tempera, and watercolors.

Boris Shamanov was a member of the Saint Petersburg Union of Artists from 1960.

Since 1960, Boris Shamanov combined his creative activities with pedagogical work at the painting department of the Leningrad Higher School of Art and Industry named after Vera Mukhina. In years of 1988-2008, he was a professor and head of painting department.

In 1984 Boris Shamanov was awarded the honorary title of Honored Artist of the RSFSR. In 1995 he was awarded the honorary title of People's Artist of the Russian Federation.

Boris Ivanovich Shamanov died on March 1, 2008, in Saint Petersburg. His paintings reside in State Russian Museum, State Treryakov Gallery, in art museums and private collections in Russia, France, England, US, China, Italy, Japan, and other countries.

== See also ==
- Leningrad School of Painting
- List of 20th-century Russian painters
- List of painters of Saint Petersburg Union of Artists
- Saint Petersburg Union of Artists

== Bibliography ==
- Matthew C. Bown. Dictionary of 20th Century Russian and Soviet Painters 1900-1980s. - London: Izomar, 1998. ISBN 0-9532061-0-6, ISBN 978-0-9532061-0-0.
- Time for change. The Art of 1960-1985 in the Soviet Union. - Saint Petersburg: State Russian Museum, 2006. - pp. 172–173.
- Sergei V. Ivanov. Unknown Socialist Realism. The Leningrad School. - Saint Petersburg: NP-Print Edition, 2007. – pp. 9, 19-21, 24, 27, 30, 31, 61, 302, 372, 390-402, 404-407, 415-424, 445. ISBN 5-901724-21-6, ISBN 978-5-901724-21-7.
- Логвинова Е. Круглый стол по ленинградскому искусству в галерее АРКА // Петербургские искусствоведческие тетради. Вып. 31. СПб, 2014. С.17-26.
