= Dmitry Oboznenko =

Russian painter

- Дмитрий Обозненко
- Born: 10 July 1930; Leningrad, Russian SFSR, Soviet Union
- Died: 19 June 2002 (aged 71); Saint Petersburg, Russia
- Education: Repin Institute of Arts
- Known for: Painting; graphics
- Movement: Realism
- Awards: Honored Artist of the RSFSR

Dmitry Georgievich Oboznenko (Russian: Дмитрий Георгиевич Обозненко; 10 July 1930 – 19 June 2002) was a Soviet Russian painter, graphic artist, Honored Artist of the RSFSR who lived and worked in Saint Petersburg. He was a member of the Saint Petersburg Union of Artists (before 1992 – the Leningrad branch of Union of Artists of Russian Federation), regarded as a representative of the Leningrad school of painting, most famous for his genre compositions and combat paintings of the siege of Stalingrad. He was a noted poster and caricature artist, a member of The Fighting Pencil Group.

== Biography ==
Dmitry Georgievich Oboznenko was born on 10 July 1930 in Leningrad, USSR. In 1951 he entered at the first course of painting department of the Leningrad Institute of Painting, Sculpture and Architecture named after Ilya Repin. He studied of Vladimir Gorb, Valery Pimenov, Vitaly Valtsev, Rudolf Frentz.

In 1957, Dmitry Oboznenko graduated from Leningrad Institute of Painting, Sculpture and Architecture in Josef Serebriany workshop. His graduation work was painting named "Nightingales", devoted to the memory of soldiers of the Great Patriotic War (1941–1945).

Since 1957 Dmitry Oboznenko has participated in Art Exhibitions. He painted portraits, genre and battle paintings, landscapes, sketches from the life. He worked in oil painting, pencil drawings, watercolors, and satiric posters. The most important paintings that brought recognition of Dmitry Oboznenko, were devoted to the theme of the Great Patriotic War, the image of the Russian soldier, a moral victory in the confrontation of cruelty and evil. In 1978 Dmitry Oboznenko was awarded the honorary title of Honored Artist of the RSFSR.

Dmitry Oboznenko was a member of the Saint Petersburg Union of Artists (before 1992 – the Leningrad branch of Union of Artists of Russian Federation since 1957.

Dmitry Georgievich Oboznenko died in Saint Petersburg in 2002. Paintings by Dmitry Oboznenko reside in State Russian Museum, State Treryakov Gallery, in Art museums and private collections in Russia, England, in the U.S., China, Ukraine, Italy, Japan, France and other countries.

== See also ==
- Leningrad School of Painting
- List of Russian artists
- List of 20th-century Russian painters
- List of painters of Saint Petersburg Union of Artists
- Saint Petersburg Union of Artists

== Bibliography ==
- Directory of members of the Leningrad branch of Union of Artists of Russian Federation. – Leningrad: Khudozhnik RSFSR, 1987. - p. 94.
- L' École de Leningrad. Catalogue. Paris: Drouot Richelieu, 12 March 1990, p. 66-67.
- L' École de Leningrad. Catalogue. Paris: Drouot Richelieu, 11 June 1990, p. 92-93.
- L' École de Leningrad. Catalogue. Paris: Drouot Richelieu, 21 December 1990, p. 64-65.
- Matthew C. Bown. Dictionary of 20th Century Russian and Soviet Painters 1900-1980s. - London: Izomar, 1998. ISBN 0-9532061-0-6, ISBN 978-0-9532061-0-0.
- Sergei V. Ivanov. Unknown Socialist Realism. The Leningrad School. Saint Petersburg: NP-Print Edition, 2007, pp. 9, 20, 27, 307, 338, 366, 391-393, 395-399, 401, 402, 404-406, 415-419, 421-424, 439. ISBN 5-901724-21-6, ISBN 978-5-901724-21-7.
- Anniversary Directory graduates of Saint Petersburg State Academic Institute of Painting, Sculpture, and Architecture named after Ilya Repin, Russian Academy of Arts. 1915–2005. Saint Petersburg: Pervotsvet Publishing House, 2007. p. 79. ISBN 978-5-903677-01-6.
