= German Tatarinov =

Russian painter

German Alexeevich Tatarinov
- Born: 26 September 1925; Starye Kresty, Yaroslavl Oblast, USSR
- Died: 3 August 2006 (aged 80); Saint Petersburg, Russian Federation
- Education: Moscow Polygraphic Institute
- Known for: Painting
- Movement: Realism
- Awards: Order of Red Star, Order of the Patriotic War, Honored Artist of Russian Federation

German Alexeevich Tatarinov (Russian: Ге́рман Алексе́евич Тата́ринов; 26 September 1925 – 3 August 2006) – Soviet, Russian painter, Honored Artist of Russian Federation, lived and worked in Leningrad, regarded as one of representatives of the Leningrad school of painting, most famous for his landscape paintings.

== Biography ==
German Alexeevich Tatarinov was born on 26 September 1925 in Old Crosses village, Yaroslavl Province, into a peasant family. In 1930 the family moved to a permanent place of residence in the town of Myshkin, now the Yaroslavl Province.

In 1942, German Tatarinov was drafted into the Red Army, took part in the battles of Stalingrad and the Soviet Far East against Japan.

Since 1949 German Tatarinov lived and worked in Leningrad.

In 1952, German Tatarinov graduated from the Leningrad Naval Political School named after Andrey Zhdanov. In 1953 he enrolled in the correspondence department of the Moscow Polygraphic Institute, which he graduated in 1961, the studio of Gennady Epifanov.

In 1961, German Tatarinov of Discharged from military service and went to work as an artist in a Leningrad department of Art Fund of Russian Federation.

Since 1967 German Tatarinov has participated in Art Exhibitions. Painted landscapes, still lifes, genre compositions. Solo Exhibitions by German Tatarinov were in Leningrad (1975) and Myshkin(1999).

German Tatarinov mostly worked as landscape painter. The color works restrained, based on the relationship of green and ocher tones. Composition and style gravitated toward plain air painting and full-scale panoramic subjects with a wide coverage area, with a consistently readable plans, while maintaining the constructive role of the figure.

German Tatarinov was a Member of the Saint Petersburg Union of Artists (before 1992 – Leningrad branch of Union of Artists of Russian Federation) since 1972, a Member of Peter's Academy of Sciences and Arts (1995).

In 2000, German Tatarinov was awarded the honorary title of Honored Artist of Russian Federation.

German Alexeevich Tatarinov died in Saint Petersburg in 2006. Paintings by German Tatarinov are in Art museums and private collections in Russia, France, USA, Finland, Germany, England, Japan, and throughout the world.

== Honours and awards ==
- Honoured Artist of the RSFSR
- Order of the Red Star
- Medal "For the Victory over Japan"
- Medal "For the Victory over Germany in the Great Patriotic War 1941–1945"

== See also ==
- List of painters of Saint Petersburg Union of Artists
- List of the Russian Landscape painters

== Bibliography ==
- Matthew C. Bown. Dictionary of 20th Century Russian and Soviet Painters 1900-1980s. - London: Izomar, 1998. ISBN 0-9532061-0-6, ISBN 978-0-9532061-0-0.
- Sergei V. Ivanov. Unknown Socialist Realism. The Leningrad School. – Saint Petersburg: NP-Print Edition, 2007. – pp. 254, 277, 370, 394, 396, 397, 400, 402, 403, 405, 406, 444. ISBN 5-901724-21-6, ISBN 978-5-901724-21-7.
- Artists of Peter's Academy of Arts and Sciences. - Saint Petersburg: Ladoga Edition, 2008. - pp. 176–177.
