= Vitaly Tulenev =

Russian painter

Vitaly Ivanovich Tulenev
- Born: 28 February 1937; Leningrad, USSR
- Died: 25 August 1997 (aged 60); Saint Petersburg, Russian Federation
- Education: Repin Institute of Arts
- Known for: Painting
- Movement: Realism, Surrealism
- Awards: Honored Artist of the Russian Federation

Vitaly Ivanovich Tulenev (Russian: Вита́лий Ива́нович Тюле́нев; 28 February 1937 in Leningrad, USSR – 25 August 1997 in Saint Petersburg, Russia) was a Soviet Russian painter, watercolorist, graphic artist, art teacher, Honored Artist of the Russian Federation, lived and worked in Saint Petersburg, regarded as one of the leading representatives of the "left" wing of the Leningrad school of painting.

== Biography ==
Vitaly Ivanovich Tulenev was born on 28 February 1937 in Leningrad, USSR.

In 1956 Vitaly Tulenev was adopted by the Department of painting of the Leningrad Institute of Painting, Sculpture and Architecture named after Ilya Repin. He studied of Piotr Fomin, Viktor Oreshnikov.

In 1962 Vitaly Tulenev graduated from Ilya Repin Institute in Evsey Moiseenko personal Art Studio. His graduation work was genre painting named "A First furrow".

Since 1963 Vitaly Tulenev has participated in Art Exhibitions. Painted portraits, genre and historical pictures, landscapes. Worked in oil painting and watercolors. Solo Exhibitions by Vitaly Tulenev were in Leningrad (1991) and Saint Petersburg (1997).

Since the end of 1960s traditional realism in paintings of Vitali Tulenev replaced by mystical stories, with images from today up to the artist childhood and adolescence. They live in picture against the laws of time and space. Their selection and formation caused by ideas and poetic taste of artist only.

In paintings of Vitaly Tulenev color loses self-sustaining value, forming a kind of shaky aloof "environment", some picturesque equivalent of time, from which we can see images and symbols, folding in the texts and messages.

Vitaly Tulenev was a member of Saint Petersburg Union of Artists (before 1992 - the Leningrad branch of Union of Artists of Russian Federation) since 1964.

In the years of 1966–1972 Vitaly Tulenev worked as Art Teacher in Leningrad Institute of Painting, Sculpture and Architecture named after Ilya Repin.

In 1984, Vitaly Tulenev was awarded the honorary title of Honored Artist of Russian Federation.

Vitaly Ivanovich Tulenev died in Leningrad in 1997. Paintings by Vitaly Tulenev reside in State Russian Museum, State Tretyakov Gallery, in the lot of Art museums and private collections in Russia, China, England, Japan, USA, and throughout the world.

== See also ==
- Leningrad School of Painting
- List of Russian artists
- List of 20th-century Russian painters
- List of painters of Saint Petersburg Union of Artists
- List of the Russian Landscape painters
- Saint Petersburg Union of Artists

== Sources ==
- Saint-Pétersbourg - Pont-Audemer. Dessins, Gravures, Sculptures et Tableaux du XX siècle du fonds de L' Union des Artistes de Saint-Pétersbourg. - Pont-Audemer: 1994. - pp. 70, 72, 84.
- Matthew C. Bown. Dictionary of 20th Century Russian and Soviet Painters 1900-1980s. - London: Izomar, 1998. ISBN 0-9532061-0-6, ISBN 978-0-9532061-0-0.
- Time for change. The Art of 1960-1985 in the Soviet Union. - Saint Petersburg: State Russian Museum, 2006. - p. 179.
- Sergei V. Ivanov. Unknown Socialist Realism. The Leningrad School. - Saint Petersburg: NP-Print Edition, 2007. – pp. 9, 19, 20, 24, 359, 372, 389-407, 445. ISBN 5-901724-21-6, ISBN 978-5-901724-21-7.
- Логвинова Е. Круглый стол по ленинградскому искусству в галерее АРКА // Петербургские искусствоведческие тетради. Вып. 31. СПб, 2014. С.17-26.
