= Alexander Shmidt =

Russian painter

Alexander Vladimirovich Shmidt
- Born: 15 August 1911; Rechytsa, Minsk Governorate, Russian Empire
- Died: 5 May 1987 (aged 75); Leningrad, USSR
- Education: Repin Institute of Arts
- Known for: Painting, graphics, art teaching
- Movement: Realism

Alexander Vladimirovich Shmidt (Russian: Алекса́ндр Влади́мирович Шми́дт; 15 August 1911 – 5 May 1987) was a Russian-Soviet realist painter, graphic artist, and Art teacher who lived and worked in Leningrad. He was a member of the Leningrad Union of Artists, regarded as one of representatives of the Leningrad School of Painting.

== Biography ==
Alexander Vladimirovich Shmidt was born on 15 August 1911 in the town of Rechytsa, in the Minsk Governorate of the Russian Empire (present-day Gomel region, Belarus).

In the 1928, Alexander Shmidt entered at the first course of the painting department of the Leningrad's Vkhutemas (since 1932 known as Leningrad Institute of Painting, Sculpture and Architecture). There he studied under Alexander Savinov, Vasily Savinsky, Arcady Rylov, and Kuzma Petrov-Vodkin. In 1933, Alexander Shmidt graduated from the Leningrad Institute of Painting, Sculpture and Architecture as artist of easel painting.

Since 1941 Alexander Shmidt has participated in Art Exhibitions. He painted cityscapes, portraits, landscapes, still lifes, and genre paintings. His solo art works exhibitions were in Leningrad in years of 1962, 1973, 1983, and 1989.

Since 1955, Alexander Shmidt was a member of the Leningrad Union of Artists. In years of 1947–1949, Alexander Shmidt taught drawings and painting in the Leningrad's Higher School of Art and Industry (since 1953 named after Vera Mukhina).

In years of 1949–1971, Alexander Shmidt was a founder and a head of well-known Art Studio of the Wiborgsky Palace of Culture in Leningrad.

Alexander Shmidt was a most famous for his lyrical cityscapes of Leningrad. His painting style distinguished by soft lyrical interpretation of the image, semi-transparent watercolor painting in transfer of the lighting and air. The color of his works is restrained, based on the exquisite tones.

Alexander Vladimirovich Shmidt died on 5 May 1987 in Leningrad. His paintings reside in museums and private collections in Russia, Germany, France, England, the U.S., Italy, and others.

== See also ==
- Leningrad School of Painting
- List of 20th-century Russian painters
- List of painters of Saint Petersburg Union of Artists
- Saint Petersburg Union of Artists

== Sources ==
- Saint-Pétersbourg – Pont-Audemer. Dessins, Gravures, Sculptures et Tableaux du XX siècle du fonds de L' Union des Artistes de Saint-Pétersbourg. – Pont-Audemer: 1994. – p. 59.
- Sergei V. Ivanov. Unknown Socialist Realism. The Leningrad School. – Saint Petersburg: NP-Print Edition, 2007. – pp. 9, 18, 27, 29, 77, 170, 373, 389–391, 393–399, 402–404, 414–419, 421, 422, 445. ISBN 5-901724-21-6, ISBN 978-5-901724-21-7.
