= Vera Nazina =

Russian painter (born 1931)

Vera Ivanovna Nazina
- Born: 26 April 1931 (age 95); Leningrad, USSR
- Education: Vera Mukhina Institute
- Known for: Painting
- Movement: Realism

Vera Ivanovna Nazina (Russian: Ве́ра Ива́новна На́зина; born 26 April 1931) is a Soviet Russian painter, graphic artist. Living and working in Saint Petersburg, she is a member of the Saint Petersburg Union of Artists (before 1992, the Leningrad branch of Union of Artists of Russian Federation), and is regarded as one of representatives of the Leningrad school of painting.

== Biography ==
Vera Ivanovna Nazina was born on 26 April 1931 in Leningrad, USSR. In 1945-1946 she engaged in the art studio of the House of Young Pioneers and Schoolchildren of Dzerzhinsky district of Leningrad.

In 1947, Vera Nazina entered the сeramics department of the School of Art and Industry in Leningrad. In 1950, Vera Nazina transferred at the faculty of monumental and decorative painting, she studied of Alexander Kazantsev, Ivan Stepashkin, Piotr Buchkin, Gleb Savinov.

In 1955, Vera Nazina graduated from Higher School of Art and Industry named after Vera Mukhina in Alexander Kazantsev workshop. Her graduation work was genre painting named "Children at harvest".

Vera Nazina has participated in Art Exhibitions Since 1958. She paints portraits, genre paintings, home interiors, landscapes, still life, sketches from the life. Vera Nazina mostly works in the technique of tempera painting and watercolors. Her personal exhibitions were in Leningrad (1984), and in 1985 in towns of Slantsy and Ivangorod, both in Leningrad Province.

The leading themes of Vera Nazina's works include images of babies, people and works inspired by the way of life in the northern Russian countryside. Her paintings often favour red and pink tones, with a prominent use of colour.

In search of plots and original materials for their work, Vera Nazina often traveled to Karelia and the Arkhangelsk region, she visited Kargopol, Shozhma, Nyandoma, Kholmogory, worked in Staraya Ladoga, and on the Academicheskaya Dacha.

Vera Nazina is a member of Saint Petersburg Union of Artists (before 1992 - the Leningrad branch of Union of Artists of Russian Federation) since 1960.

Paintings by Vera Ivanovna Nazina reside in State Russian Museum, in Art museums and private collections of Russia, France, Germany, Finland, USA, England, and in other countries.

== See also ==
- Leningrad School of Painting
- List of Russian artists
- List of 20th-century Russian painters
- List of painters of Saint Petersburg Union of Artists
- Saint Petersburg Union of Artists

== Bibliography ==
- Vern G. Swanson. Soviet Impressionism. - Woodbridge, England: Antique Collectors' Club, 2001. - pp. 139, 149.
- Sergei V. Ivanov. Unknown Socialist Realism. The Leningrad School. - Saint Petersburg: NP-Print Edition, 2007. – pp. 19, 21, 328, 365, 392-400, 402, 403, 405-407, 416-421, 423, 424, 444. ISBN 5-901724-21-6, ISBN 978-5-901724-21-7.
