= Engels Kozlov =

Russian painter

Engels Vasilievich Kozlov
- Born: March 24, 1926; Troitsko-Pechorsk, Komi Republic, USSR
- Died: November 20, 2007 (aged 81); Saint Petersburg, Russia
- Education: Repin Institute of Arts
- Known for: Painting
- Movement: Realism
- Awards: People's Artist of Russia

Engels Vasilievich Kozlov (Russian: Э́нгельс Васи́льевич Козло́в; March 24, 1926, – November 20, 2007) was a Soviet Russian painter, People's Artist of Russia, lived and worked in Leningrad – Saint Petersburg, regarded as one of representatives of the Leningrad school of painting, most famous for his genre and portrait painting.

== Biography ==
Engels Vasilievich Kozlov was born March 24, 1926, in Troitsko-Pechorsk, Komi Republic, USSR.

In 1947–1949 Engels Kozlov studied in the Yaroslavl Art College, then in Tavricheskaya Art School in Leningrad (1949–1950).

In 1950, Engels Kozlov comes to the first year painting department of the Leningrad Institute of Painting, Sculpture and Architecture named after Ilya Repin. Studied at Vitaly Valtsev, Ivan Stepashkin.

In 1956 Engels Kozlov graduated from Ilya Repin Institute in Yuri Neprintsev workshop, graduation picture – "He will live!".

Engels Kozlov has participated in Art Exhibitions since 1956. He painted portraits, genre pictures, landscapes, and still lifes.

The leading theme of creativity Engels Kozlov primarily expressed was contemporary images. This embodied in the genre of thematic pictures, portrait and portrait-painting, reflecting the artist's attraction to subjects of great social and civic playing.

His painting based on the sonorous light and shadow contrasts. The color is saturated, with a predominance of the favorite combinations of blue-green and yellow-brown tones.

Significant place in the works of Engels Kozlov took issue industrial development of the Russian North. A lot of sketch from the life imported from numerous trips to the oil workers of Ukhta (1961–1963), Inta miners (1961–1963, 1964, 1966, 1987–1989), from the Pechora River region (1965, 1968, 1969) became the basis of paintings that have brought the artist fame. First of all, the paintings "Black Gold" (1969), "Drillers at Colva" (1971), "Pechora oil workers"(1975).

Engels Kozlov was a delegate II, III, IV, and V All-Russian Congresses of Soviet Artists (1968, 1971, 1975, 1981), and V, VI All-Union Congresses of Soviet Artists in Moscow (1977, 1982). He was repeatedly elected a member of the Board of the Leningrad branch of the Union of Artists of Russian Federation.

Engels Kozlov was a Member of Saint Petersburg Union of Artists (before 1992 Leningrad branch of Union of Artists of Russian Federation) since 1956.

In 1978, Engels Kozlov was awarded the honorary title of Honored Artist of the RSFSR, in 1987 – People's Artist of the Russian Federation. Also he was awarded the honorary title of People's Artist of Komi Republic (1982).

Engels Kozlov personal Exhibitions were in Leningrad (1976), Moscow (1987), Siktivkar (2006).

Engels Vasilievich Kozlov died on November 20, 2007, in Saint Petersburg at the eighty-first year of life. His paintings reside in State Russian Museum, in Art museums and private collections in the Russia, Japan, in the U.S., Germany, England, France, and throughout the world.

== See also ==
- Leningrad School of Painting
- List of Russian artists
- List of 20th-century Russian painters
- List of painters of Saint Petersburg Union of Artists
- Saint Petersburg Union of Artists

== Bibliography ==
- Across the Motherland Exhibition of Leningrad artists. Catalogue. – Leningrad: Khudozhnik RSFSR, 1974. -p. 14.
- Engels Vasilievich Kozlov. Exhibition of works. Catalogue. – Leningrad: Khudozhnik RSFSR, 1976. – 34 p.
- Peinture Russe. Catalogue. – Paris: Drouot Richelieu, 18 Fevrier, 1991. – p. 7,45–47.
- Matthew C. Bown. Dictionary of 20th Century Russian and Soviet Painters 1900-1980s. – London: Izomar 1998. ISBN 0-9532061-0-6, ISBN 978-0-9532061-0-0.
- Vern G. Swanson. Soviet Impressionism. – Woodbridge, England: Antique Collectors' Club, 2001. – pp. 148, 152, 273, 274.
- Artist Engels Kozlov. – Syktivkar: Komi Republic National Art Gallery, 2006. – 40 p.
- Sergei V. Ivanov. Unknown Socialist Realism. The Leningrad School.- Saint Petersburg: NP-Print Edition, 2007. – pp. 9, 20, 24, 357, 388–401, 403–406, 439. ISBN 5-901724-21-6, ISBN 978-5-901724-21-7.
