= Ivan Lavsky =

Russian painter

Ivan Ivanovich Lavsky
- Born: 23 August 1919; Dnipropetrovsk, Ukraine
- Died: 10 October 1977 (aged 58); Leningrad, USSR
- Education: Dnipropetrovsk Art School
- Known for: Painting, graphics
- Movement: Realism

Ivan Ivanovich Lavsky (Russian: Ива́н Ива́нович Ла́вский; Ukrainian: Іва́н Іва́нович Ла́вський 23 August 1919, city of Dnipropetrovsk, Ukraine Soviet Republic – 10 October 1977, Leningrad, USSR) was a Soviet realist painter and graphic artist, born in Ukraine who after World War II lived and worked in Leningrad. He was a member of the Leningrad Union of Artists and regarded as one of representatives of the Leningrad School of Painting.

== Biography ==
Lavsky was born on 15 August 1919 in the industrial city of Dnipropetrovsk, Soviet Ukraine Republic.

In 1939 Lavsky graduated from Dnipropetrovsk Art School, where he studied under Mikhail Panin.

In 1941–1945, Lavsky took part in the Great Patriotic War, which led the Soviet people against Nazi Germany and its allies. As a machine gunner, he participated in the battles, was wounded and marked by military awards.

In 1946–1949 Lavsky attended the Art Studio of the Leningrad House of Officers of Red Army, where his teachers were known artists Michail Avilov and Alfred Eberling.

Starting in 1947 Lavsky participated in art exhibitions. He painted landscapes, genre scenes, cityscapes, sketches from the life.

Since 1956, Lavsky was a member of the Leningrad Union of Artists. In 1950–1970 years he made a creative journey in Old Ladoga, Goryachy Klyuch, Gurzuf, Monchegorsk, in Central Asia.

Lavsky died on 10 October 1977 in Leningrad. His paintings reside in museums and private collections in Russia, Ukraine, France, England, the U.S., Italy, and others.

== See also ==
- Leningrad School of Painting
- List of Russian artists
- List of 20th-century Russian painters
- List of painters of Saint Petersburg Union of Artists
- List of the Russian Landscape painters
- Saint Petersburg Union of Artists

== Sources ==
- The Spring Exhibition of works by Leningrad artists of 1954. Exhibition Catalogue. – Leningrad: Izogiz Edition, 1954. – p. 13.
- The Spring Exhibition of works by Leningrad artists of 1955. Catalogue. – Leningrad: Leningrad Union of Artists, 1956. – p. 12.
- The Spring Exhibition of works by Leningrad artists of 1956. Catalogue. – Leningrad: Leningrad Union of Artists, 1956.
- Autumn Exhibition of works by Leningrad artists of 1956. Exhibition Catalogue. – Leningrad: Leningrad Union of Artists Edition, 1958. – p. 53.
- 1917 – 1957. Exhibition of works by Leningrad artists of 1957. Exhibition Catalogue. – Leningrad: Khudozhnik RSFSR, 1958. – p. 20.
- Autumn Exhibition of works by Leningrad artists of 1958. Exhibition Catalogue. – Leningrad: Khudozhnik RSFSR, 1959. – p. 16.
- Exhibition of works by Leningrad artists of 1960. Exhibition catalogue. – Leningrad: Khudozhnik RSFSR, 1963. – p. 12.
- Exhibition of works by Leningrad artists of 1960. Exhibition catalogue. – Leningrad: Khudozhnik RSFSR, 1961. – p. 24.
- Soviet Russia republic exhibition of 1960. Exhibition catalogue. – Moscow: Ministry of culture of Russian Federation, 1960. – p. 47.
- Exhibition of works by Leningrad artists of 1961. Exhibition catalogue. – Leningrad: Khudozhnik RSFSR, 1964. – p. 24.
- Autumn Exhibition of works by Leningrad artists of 1962. Exhibition Catalogue. – Leningrad: : Khudozhnik RSFSR, 1962. – p. 16.
- The Leningrad Fine Arts Exhibition. – Leningrad: Khudozhnik RSFSR, 1965. – p. 29.
- The Fall Exhibition of works by Leningrad artists of 1968. Catalogue. – Leningrad: Khudozhnik RSFSR, 1971. – p. 10.
- The Spring Exhibition of works by Leningrad artists of 1969. Catalogue. – Leningrad: Khudozhnik RSFSR, 1970. – p. 12.
- The Spring Exhibition of works by Leningrad artists of 1971. Catalogue. – Leningrad: Khudozhnik RSFSR, 1972. – p. 10.
- Exhibition of works by Leningrad artists dedicated to the 25th Anniversary of the Victory in Great Patriotic war. Catalogue. – Leningrad: Khudozhnik RSFSR, 1972. – pp. 7, 21.
- Art works by Russian Federation Artists grants to Museums and Culture Institutions (1963–1971). Official Catalogue. – Moscow: Russian Federation Union of Artists, 1972. – p. 57.
- Across the Motherland Exhibition of Leningrad artists. Catalogue. – Leningrad: Khudozhnik RSFSR, 1974. – p. 16.
- Exhibition of works by Leningrad artists dedicated to the 60th Anniversary of October Revolution. Catalogue. – Leningrad: Khudozhnik RSFSR, 1982. – p. 16.
- Exhibitions of Soviet art. Directory. Volume 5. 1954 – 1958. – Moscow: Soviet Artist, 1981. – pp. 25, 142, 259, 261, 386, 548.
- Directory of members of the Union of Artists of USSR. Volume 1. – Moscow: Soviet artist, 1979. – p. 606.
- Painting from the life, by Leningrad artists. Exhibition catalogue. – Saint Petersburg: Nikolai Nekrasov Memorial museum, 1994. – p. 4.
- The Lyrics in the works of artists of the war generation. Painting, drawings. Exhibition catalogue. – Saint Petersburg: Nikolai Nekrasov Memorial museum, 1995. – p. 4.
- Sergei V. Ivanov. Unknown Socialist Realism. The Leningrad School. – Saint Petersburg: NP-Print Edition, 2007. – pp. 18, 24, 29, 31, 318, 363, 390, 392–399, 404, 405, 414, 416–419, 422. ISBN 5-901724-21-6, ISBN 978-5-901724-21-7.
