= Lazar Yazgur =

Russian painter (1928–2000)

Lazar Semionovich Yazgur
- Born: 7 June 1928; Leningrad, USSR
- Died: 2000 (aged 71–72); Israel
- Education: Vera Mukhina Institute
- Known for: Painting, Graphics
- Movement: Realism

Lazar Semionovich Yazgur (Russian: Ла́зарь Семё́нович Язгу́р; 7 June 1928, Leningrad, USSR – 2000, Israel) was a Soviet, Russian Jewish realist painter, who lived and worked in Leningrad, a member of the Saint Petersburg Union of Artists (before 1992 - the Leningrad branch of Union of Artists of Russian Federation), regarded as one of the representatives of the Leningrad school of painting.

== Biography ==
Lazar Semionovich Yazgur was born on 7 June 1928 in Leningrad.

In 1946, Yazgur entered in Tavricheskaya Art School, which graduated in 1949. In 1950, he entered at the Department of Monumental Painting of the Leningrad Higher School of Industrial Art named after Vera Mukhina, where he studied of Ivan Stepashkin, Sergei Petrov, Kirill Iogansen. In 1953, Yazgur graduated from the Higher School of Industrial Art in Anatoli Kazantsev workshop.

Since 1957, Lazar Yazgur has participated in Art Exhibitions. He painted landscapes, genre scenes, sketches from the life. Most famous for his lyrical landscapes, and etudes done from nature in Old Ladoga in 1950-1970s. In 1961, Lazar Yazgur was admitted to the Leningrad Union of Artists (since 1992 known as the Saint Petersburg Union of Artists).

Lazar Semionovich Yazgur died in 2000 in Israel, where he lived since 1993. His paintings reside in Art museums and private collections in Russia, Japan, Germany, Israel, the U.S., and throughout the world.

== See also ==
- Leningrad School of Painting
- List of Russian artists
- List of 20th-century Russian painters
- List of painters of Saint Petersburg Union of Artists
- Saint Petersburg Union of Artists

== Sources ==
- Directory of members of the Union of Artists of USSR. Volume 2. - Moscow: Soviet artist, 1979. - p. 631.
- Directory of members of the Leningrad branch of Union of Artists of Russian Federation. - Leningrad: Khudozhnik RSFSR, 1987. - p. 151.
- Etudes done from nature by the Leningrad School's artists. Exhibition catalogue - Saint Petersburg: Nikolai Nekrasov Memorial museum, 1994. - p. 6.
- Lyrical motives in the works of artists of the war generation. Painting, drawings. Exhibition catalogue. - Saint Petersburg: Nikolai Nekrasov Memorial museum, 1995. - p. 6.
- Matthew C. Bown. Dictionary of 20th Century Russian and Soviet Painters 1900-1980s. - London: Izomar, 1998. ISBN 0-9532061-0-6, ISBN 978-0-9532061-0-0.
- Sergei V. Ivanov. Unknown Socialist Realism. The Leningrad School. - Saint Petersburg: NP-Print Edition, 2007. – pp. 9, 27, 110, 305, 373, 394-396, 398, 399, 404, 405, 416-419, 422. ISBN 5-901724-21-6, ISBN 978-5-901724-21-7.
