= Mikhail Kozell =

Russian painter

Mikhail Georgievich Kozell
- Born: October 20, 1911; Astrakhan, Russian Empire
- Died: July 26, 1993 (aged 81); Saint Petersburg, Russia
- Education: Repin Institute of Arts
- Known for: Painting, Art teaching
- Movement: Realism

Mikhail Georgievich Kozell (Russian: Михаи́л Гео́ргиевич Ко́зелл; October 20, 1911 – July 26, 1993) was a Soviet Russian painter and Art teacher, who lived and worked in Leningrad (now Saint-Petersburg), and who belonged to the Leningrad School of Painting, most famous for his landscape painting.

== Biography ==
Kozell was born October 20, 1911, in Astrakhan. In 1939 Kozell graduated from Ilya Repin Institute in Isaak Brodsky workshop. Pupil of Mikhail Bernshtein, Arcady Rylov, Alexander Lubimov, Vladimir Serov. Since 1949 Kozell participated in Art Exhibitions. Painted landscapes, genre pictures, sketches from the life.

Kozell was a member of the Saint Petersburg Union of Artists since 1962. In 1948-1991 Kozell worked as an art teacher of Secondary Art School of Ilya Repin Institute in Leningrad.

Kozell died on July 26, 1993, in Saint Petersburg at 82 years of age. Paintings by Kozell reside in Art museums and private collections in Russia, U.S., England, Japan, and throughout the world.

== See also ==
- Leningrad School of Painting
- List of Russian artists
- List of 20th-century Russian painters
- List of the Russian Landscape painters
- Saint Petersburg Union of Artists

== Bibliography ==
- Across the Motherland Exhibition of Leningrad artists. Catalogue. - Leningrad: Khudozhnik RSFSR, 1974. -p. 14.
- Exhibition of modern Soviet Painting. 1976. Gekkoso Gallery. Catalogue. — Tokyo, 1976. - р.97,154.
- Exhibition of modern Soviet Painting. 1978. Gekkoso Gallery. Catalogue. — Tokyo, 1978. - р.58.
- Mikhail Kozell. Painting. Drawings. Exhibition of works. Catalogue. - Leningrad: Khudozhnik RSFSR, 1989.
- Matthew C. Bown. Dictionary of 20th Century Russian and Soviet Painters 1900-1980s. - London: Izomar, 1998. ISBN 0-9532061-0-6, ISBN 978-0-9532061-0-0.
- Sergei V. Ivanov. Unknown Socialist Realism. The Leningrad School.- Saint Petersburg: NP-Print Edition, 2007. – pp. 15, 20, 361, 390, 392, 394–398, 400–405, 445. ISBN 5-901724-21-6, ISBN 978-5-901724-21-7.
