= 1964 in fine arts of the Soviet Union =

The year 1964 was marked by many events that left an imprint on the history of Soviet and Russian Fine Arts.

== Events ==
- Exhibition the "Heroic defensive of Leningrad in the years of Great Patriotic War of 1941-1945" was opened in the State Russian Museum in Leningrad.
- Solo Exhibition of works by Mikhail Bobyshov was opened in the Leningrad Union of Artists.

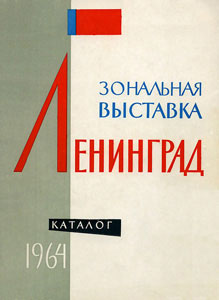
Exhibition Catalog

- November 3 — "The Leningrad" Zonal Fine Art Exhibition was opened in the State Russian Museum in Leningrad and in the exhibition halls of the Leningrad Union of Artists. The participants were Piotr Alberti, Evgenia Antipova, Taisia Afonina, Irina Baldina, Nikolai Baskakov, Evgenia Baykova, Vsevolod Bazhenov, Yuri Belov, Piotr Belousov, Olga Bogaevskaya, Piotr Buchkin, Zlata Bizova, Vladimir Chekalov, Sergei Frolov, Nikolai Galakhov, Vasily Golubev, Tatiana Gorb, Abram Grushko, Alexei Eriomin, Mikhail Kaneev, Yuri Khukhrov, Mikhail Kozell, Marina Kozlovskaya, Tatiana Kopnina, Maya Kopitseva, Boris Korneev, Alexander Koroviakov, Elena Kostenko, Nikolai Kostrov, Anna Kostrova, Gevork Kotiantz, Yaroslav Krestovsky, Valeria Larina, Boris Lavrenko, Ivan Lavsky, Piotr Litvinsky, Oleg Lomakin, Dmitry Maevsky, Gavriil Malish, Evsey Moiseenko, Nikolai Mukho, Piotr Nazarov, Vera Nazina, Mikhail Natarevich, Anatoli Nenartovich, Yuri Neprintsev, Dmitry Oboznenko, Sergei Osipov, Vladimir Ovchinnikov, Nikolai Pozdneev, Alexander Pushnin, Galina Rumiantseva, Ivan Savenko, Gleb Savinov, Vladimir Sakson, Alexander Samokhvalov, Vladimir Seleznev, Arseny Semionov, Alexander Semionov, Yuri Shablikin, Boris Shamanov, Alexander Shmidt, Nadezhda Shteinmiller, Elena Skuin, Galina Smirnova, Alexander Sokolov, Ivan Sorokin, Victor Teterin, Nikolai Timkov, Mikhail Tkachev, Mikhail Trufanov, Yuri Tulin, Vitaly Tulenev, Ivan Varichev, Anatoli Vasiliev, Piotr Vasiliev, Valery Vatenin, Lazar Yazgur, Vecheslav Zagonek, Sergei Zakharov, Ruben Zakharian, and other important Leningrad artists.
- In eve celebration of 47th Anniversary of October revolution of 1917, the Regional Fine Art Exhibitions were opened in Moscow, Sverdlovsk, Rostov-on-Don, Novosibirsk, Voronezh.
- The Grand Exhibition of Soviet Fine Art was opened in Genoa, Italy.
- Joint Exhibition of works of artists Nikolai Timkov and Samuil Nevelshtein was opened in the Leningrad Union of Artists. Then an exhibition was rotined in Moscow, Yaroslavl, Rostov-na-Don, Kislovodsk, Ordzhonikidze, Nalchik.
- The Grand Exhibition of Soviet Fine Art was opened in Prague, Czechoslovakia.
- The second All-union Convention of Artists of the USSR passed in Moscow.

== Deaths ==
- July 7 — Mikhail Bobyshov (Russian: Бобышов Михаил Павлович), Russian soviet painter, theatre and graphic artists, People's Artist of the Russian Federation (born 1885).
- July 30 — Alexander Bubnov (Russian: Бубнов Александр Павлович), Russian soviet painter, Honored Arts Worker of the RSFSR (born 1908).
- December 3 — Alexander Efimov (Russian: Ефимов Александр Алексеевич), Russian soviet painter (born 1905).
- December 29 — Vladimir Favorsky (Russian: Фаворский Владимир Андреевич), Russian soviet graphic artists, People's Artist of the Russian Federation (born 1886).
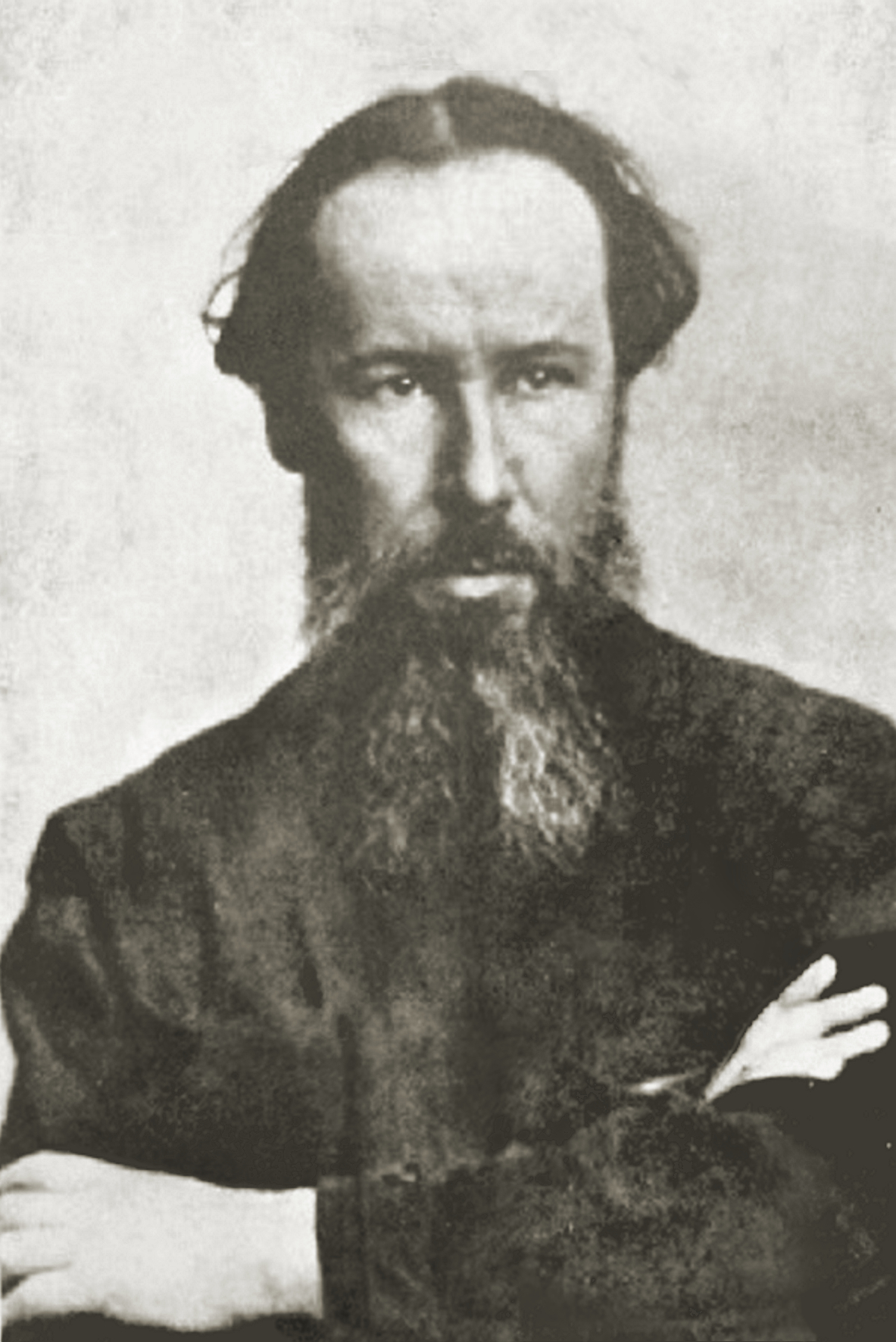
Vladimir Favorsky in the 1920s

== See also ==
- List of Russian artists
- List of painters of Leningrad Union of Artists
- Saint Petersburg Union of Artists
- Russian culture

== Sources ==
- Бетхер-Остренко И. Художественная летопись истории. // Вечерний Ленинград, 1964, 28 января.
- Работы двух художников // Вечерний Ленинград, 1964, 16 марта.
- Зональная выставка "Ленинград". 1964 год. Каталог. Л., Художник РСФСР, 1965.
- Аникушин М. Солнце на полотнах. // Ленинградская правда, 1964, 3 ноября.
- Колесова О. Две тысячи встреч. На выставке "Ленинград". // Ленинградская правда, 1964, 4 ноября.
- Литературная Россия, 1964, 6 ноября.
- Молдавский Д. "Ленинград", На зональных художественных выставках // Литературная Россия, 1964, 27 ноября.
- Копелян Г. Удачи и просчёты молодых // Смена, 1964, 28 ноября.
- Воронова О. Краски России. // Комсомольская правда, 1964, 18 декабря.
- Дмитренко А. Взором современника // Смена, 1964, 27 декабря.
- Самуил Невельштейн, Николай Тимков. Выставка произведений. Живопись. Графика. Каталог. М., 1964.
- А. Яр—Кравченко. С открытой душой // Советская культура, 1964, 21 мая.
- В. Симоновская. Родина, её красота. // Ленинградская правда, 1964, 18 марта.
- Бобышов Михаил Павлович. Выставка произведений. Каталог. Л., Художник РСФСР, 1964.
- В. Кручина. Неувядающая молодость творчества // Вечерний Ленинград, 1964, 16 апреля.
- Artists of Peoples of the USSR. Biography Dictionary. Vol. 1. Moscow, Iskusstvo, 1970.
- Artists of Peoples of the USSR. Biography Dictionary. Vol. 2. Moscow, Iskusstvo, 1972.
- Directory of Members of Union of Artists of USSR. Volume 1,2. Moscow, Soviet Artist Edition, 1979.
- Directory of Members of the Leningrad branch of the Union of Artists of Russian Federation. Leningrad, Khudozhnik RSFSR, 1980.
- Artists of Peoples of the USSR. Biography Dictionary. Vol. 4 Book 1. Moscow, Iskusstvo, 1983.
- Directory of Members of the Leningrad branch of the Union of Artists of Russian Federation. - Leningrad: Khudozhnik RSFSR, 1987.
- Artists of peoples of the USSR. Biography Dictionary. Vol. 4 Book 2. - Saint Petersburg: Academic project humanitarian agency, 1995.
- Link of Times: 1932 - 1997. Artists - Members of Saint Petersburg Union of Artists of Russia. Exhibition catalogue. - Saint Petersburg: Manezh Central Exhibition Hall, 1997.
- Matthew C. Bown. Dictionary of 20th Century Russian and Soviet Painters 1900-1980s. - London: Izomar, 1998.
- Vern G. Swanson. Soviet Impressionism. - Woodbridge, England: Antique Collectors' Club, 2001.
- Время перемен. Искусство 1960—1985 в Советском Союзе. СПб., Государственный Русский музей, 2006.
- Sergei V. Ivanov. Unknown Socialist Realism. The Leningrad School. - Saint-Petersburg: NP-Print Edition, 2007. - ISBN 5-901724-21-6, ISBN 978-5-901724-21-7.
- Anniversary Directory graduates of Saint Petersburg State Academic Institute of Painting, Sculpture, and Architecture named after Ilya Repin, Russian Academy of Arts. 1915 - 2005. - Saint Petersburg: Pervotsvet Publishing House, 2007.

== VIDEO ==
- Artist Nikolai Timkov (1912-1993). Masterpieces of landscape paintings
