= 1961 in fine arts of the Soviet Union =

The year 1961 was marked by many events that left an imprint on the history of Soviet and Russian Fine Arts.

== Events ==
- Exhibition of work by Leningrad artists based on international travels was opened in Leningrad in the Leningrad Union of Artists. The participants were Piotr Belousov, Mikhail Kaneev, Boris Lavrenko, Yuri Neprintsev, Gleb Savinov, Vecheslav Zagonek, and other important Leningrad artists.
- Solo Exhibition of works by Piotr Buchkin was opened in the Leningrad Union of Artists.
- The Exhibition of Leningrad artists of 1961 was opened in Leningrad in the State Russian Museum. The participants were Piotr Alberti, Evgenia Antipova, Taisia Afonina, Vsevolod Bazhenov, Irina Baldina, Nikolai Baskakov, Yuri Belov, Piotr Belousov, Piotr Buchkin, Zlata Bizova, Nikolai Galakhov, Elena Gorokhova, Abram Grushko, Alexei Eriomin, Mikhail Kaneev, Mikhail Kozell, Engels Kozlov, Marina Kozlovskaya, Maya Kopitseva, Boris Korneev, Elena Kostenko, Anna Kostrova, Gevork Kotiantz, Yaroslav Krestovsky, Valeria Larina, Boris Lavrenko, Ivan Lavsky, Oleg Lomakin, Dmitry Maevsky, Gavriil Malish, Evsey Moiseenko, Alexei Mozhaev, Nikolai Mukho, Vera Nazina, Mikhail Natarevich, Anatoli Nenartovich, Samuil Nevelshtein, Yuri Neprintsev, Dmitry Oboznenko, Sergei Osipov, Vladimir Ovchinnikov, Nikolai Pozdneev, Alexander Pushnin, Galina Rumiantseva, Lev Russov, Maria Rudnitskaya, Ivan Savenko, Gleb Savinov, Vladimir Sakson, Alexander Samokhvalov, Vladimir Seleznev, Arseny Semionov, Alexander Semionov, Yuri Shablikin, Boris Shamanov, Alexander Shmidt, Nadezhda Shteinmiller, Elena Skuin, Galina Smirnova, Alexander Sokolov, Alexander Stolbov, Victor Teterin, Nikolai Timkov, Leonid Tkachenko, Mikhail Trufanov, Yuri Tulin, Ivan Varichev, Anatoli Vasiliev, Piotr Vasiliev, Valery Vatenin, Lazar Yazgur, Vecheslav Zagonek, Sergei Zakharov, Maria Zubreeva, and other important Leningrad artists.

== Deaths ==
- January 25 - Nadezhda Udaltsova (Russian: Наде́жда Андре́евна Удальцо́ва, Russian avant-garde artist (Cubist, Suprematist), painter and teacher (born 1885).
- August 3 - Pavel Sokolov-Scalia, Russian painter and graphic artists (born 1899).

== Gallery of works of 1961 ==
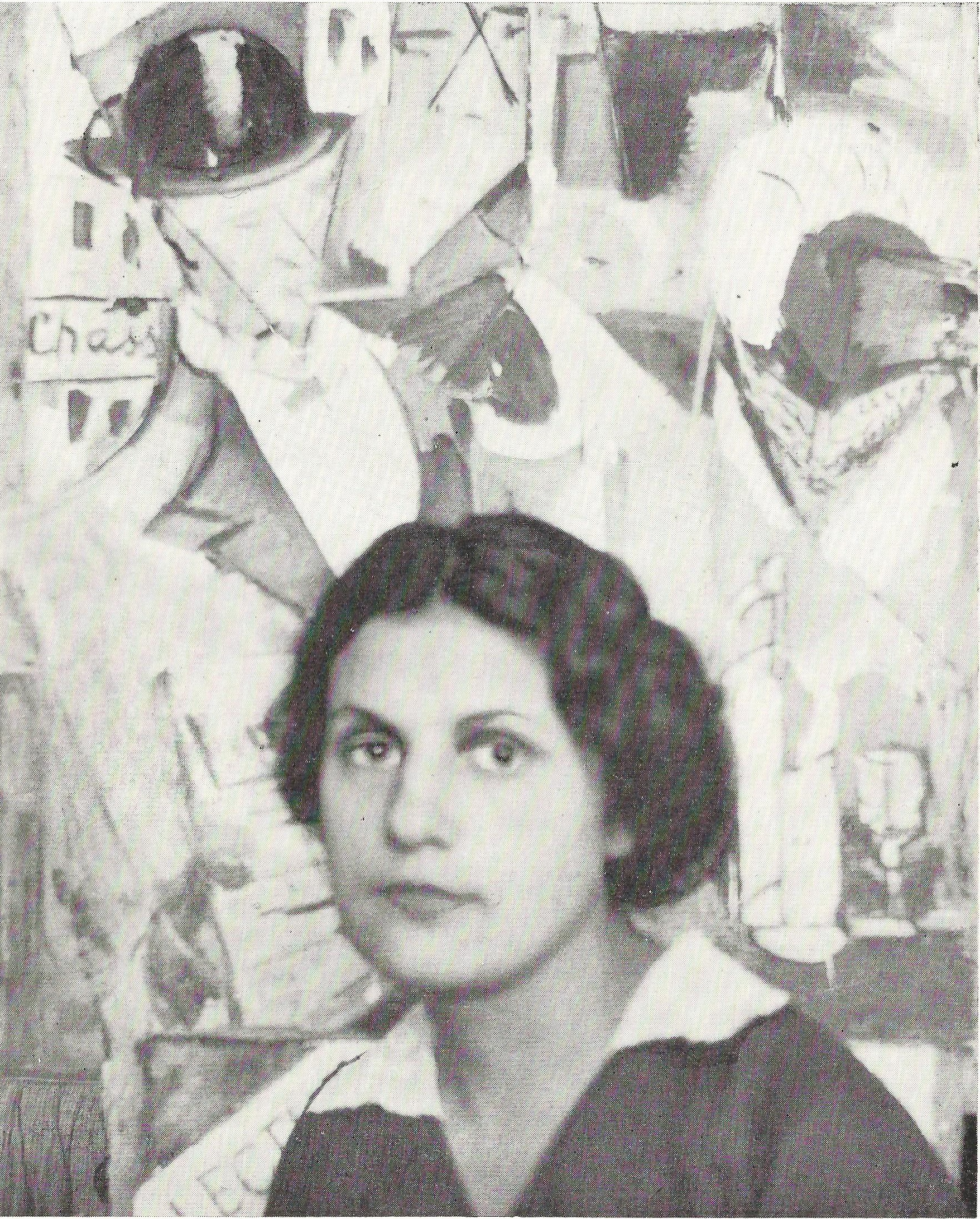
Nadezhda Udaltsova. 1915

== See also ==
- List of Russian artists
- List of painters of Leningrad Union of Artists
- Saint Petersburg Union of Artists
- Russian culture
- 1961 in the Soviet Union

== Sources ==
- Exhibition of works by Leningrad artists of 1961. Exhibition catalogue. - Leningrad: Khudozhnik RSFSR, 1964.
- Piotr Buchkin. Exhibition Catalogue. — Leningrad: Khudozhnik RSFSR, 1961.
- Artists of peoples of the USSR. Biography Dictionary. Volume 1. - Moscow: Iskusstvo, 1970.
- Artists of peoples of the USSR. Biography Dictionary. Volume 2. - Moscow: Iskusstvo, 1972.
- Fine Arts of the Leningrad. Exhibition Catalogue. - Leningrad: Khudozhnik RSFSR, 1976.
- Directory of Members of Union of Artists of USSR. Volume 1,2. - Moscow: Soviet Artist Edition, 1979.
- Directory of Members of the Leningrad branch of the Union of Artists of Russian Federation. - Leningrad: Khudozhnik RSFSR, 1980.
- Artists of peoples of the USSR. Biography Dictionary. Volume 4 Book 1. - Moscow: Iskusstvo, 1983.
- Directory of Members of the Leningrad branch of the Union of Artists of Russian Federation. - Leningrad: Khudozhnik RSFSR, 1987.
- Artists of peoples of the USSR. Biography Dictionary. Volume 4 Book 2. - Saint Petersburg: Academic project humanitarian agency, 1995.
- Link of Times: 1932 - 1997. Artists - Members of Saint Petersburg Union of Artists of Russia. Exhibition catalogue. - Saint Petersburg: Manezh Central Exhibition Hall, 1997.
- Matthew C. Bown. Dictionary of 20th Century Russian and Soviet Painters 1900-1980s. - London: Izomar, 1998.
- Vern G. Swanson. Soviet Impressionism. - Woodbridge, England: Antique Collectors' Club, 2001.
- Sergei V. Ivanov. Unknown Socialist Realism. The Leningrad School. - Saint-Petersburg: NP-Print Edition, 2007. - ISBN 5-901724-21-6, ISBN 978-5-901724-21-7.
- Anniversary Directory graduates of Saint Petersburg State Academic Institute of Painting, Sculpture, and Architecture named after Ilya Repin, Russian Academy of Arts. 1915 - 2005. - Saint Petersburg: Pervotsvet Publishing House, 2007.
- Igor N. Pishny. The Leningrad School of painting. Socialist realism of 1930-1980s: Selected names. – Saint Petersburg: Kolomenskaya versta, 2008. - ISBN 978-5-91555-005-5.
