= 1970 in fine arts of the Soviet Union =

Monument to Lenin
- Artist: Mikhail Anikushin
- Year: 1970
- Location: Moscow Square; Leningrad

The year 1970 was marked by many events that left an imprint on the history of Soviet and Russian fine arts.

== Events ==
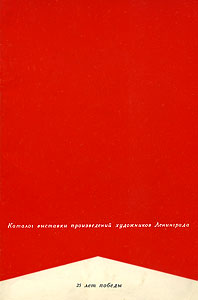
Exhibition catalog

- Exhibition of work by Leningrad artists dedicated to the 25th Anniversary of Victory in Great Patriotic war was opened in the Leningrad Union of Artists. The participants were Vladimir Andreev, Sergei Babkov, Yuri Belov, Dmitry Beliayev, Alexander Blinkov, Veniamin Borisov, Dmitry Buchkin, Rostislav Vovkushevsky, Nikolai Galakhov, Evgeny Galunov, Vasily Golubev, Alexander Gulayev, Nina Ivanova, Mikhail Kozell, Elena Kostenko, Anna Kostina, Yaroslav Krestovsky, Boris Lavrenko, Ivan Lavsky, Efim Liatsky, Vladimir Malagis, Mikhail Natarevich, Yuri Neprintsev, Dmitry Oboznenko, Ivan Savenko, Vladimir Seleznev, Alexander Semionov, Arseny Semionov, Joseph Serebriany, Nikolai Timkov, Yuri Tuliv, and other important Leningrad artists.
- Fourth Republican Art Exhibition «The Soviet Russia» dedicated to 100-years Anniversary of Vladimir Lenin was opened in Moscow. The participants were Aleksandr Gerasimov, Aleksei Gritsai, Yuri Kugach, Evsey Moiseenko, Arcady Plastov, Alexander Samokhvalov, Yuri Tuliv, Boris Ugarov, Ivan Varichev, and other important artists of Russian Federation.
- The All-Union Fine Art Exhibition dedicated to Lenin's 100-years Anniversary was opened in Moscow.
- The New Exhibition Hall of the Union of Artists of the Russian Federation was opened in Leningrad on the Sverdlov embankment.
- Exhibition named «1870-1970. Devoted to Lenin» was opened in Russian museum in Leningrad. The participants were Evgenia Antipova, Vsevolod Bazhenov, Irina Baldina, Nikolai Baskakov, Yuri Belov, Piotr Belousov, Veniamin Borisov, Sergei Frolov, Nikolai Galakhov, Vasily Golubev, Abram Grushko, Irina Dobrekova, Alexei Eriomin, Mikhail Kaneev, Yuri Khukhrov, Mikhail Kozell, Engels Kozlov, Marina Kozlovskaya, Tatiana Kopnina, Maya Kopitseva, Boris Korneev, Alexander Koroviakov, Elena Kostenko, Nikolai Kostrov, Anna Kostrova, Gevork Kotiantz, Vladimir Krantz, Yaroslav Krestovsky, Boris Lavrenko, Ivan Lavsky, Oleg Lomakin, Dmitry Maevsky, Gavriil Malish, Evsey Moiseenko, Mikhail Natarevich, Samuil Nevelshtein, Yuri Neprintsev, Dmitry Oboznenko, Sergei Osipov, Vladimir Ovchinnikov, Lev Orekhov, Nikolai Pozdneev, Alexander Pushnin, Ivan Savenko, Gleb Savinov, Vladimir Sakson, Alexander Samokhvalov, Arseny Semionov, Alexander Semionov, Elena Skuin, Yuri Shablikin, Boris Shamanov, Elena Skuin, Galina Smirnova, Alexander Stolbov, Victor Teterin, Nikolai Timkov, Leonid Tkachenko, Mikhail Trufanov, Yuri Tulin, Vitaly Tulenev, Igor Veselkin, Anatoli Vasiliev, Piotr Vasiliev, Valery Vatenin, Vecheslav Zagonek, and other important Leningrad artists.
- A monument to Vladimir Lenin was unveiled in Leningrad on the Moscow Square. Authors of the monument sculptor Mikhail Anikushin.
- A Marble bust on the grave of Stalin was unveiled on the Red Square in Moscow. Authors of the monument sculptor Nikolai Tomsky.

== Deaths ==
- January 10 — Meer Akselrod (Russian: Аксельрод Меер Моисеевич), soviet graphic artist and painter (born 1902).
- July 1 — Genrikh Vasiliev (Russian: Васильев Генрих Николаевич), soviet graphic and applied art artist (born 1931).
- December 12 — Nathan Altman (Russian: Альтман Натан Исаевич), soviet painter, graphic and theatre artist, Honored Artist of the Russian Federation (born 1889).
- December 23 — Boris Volkov (Russian: Волков Борис Иванович), Soviet theatre artist, People's Artist of the USSR, Stalin Prize winner (born 1900).
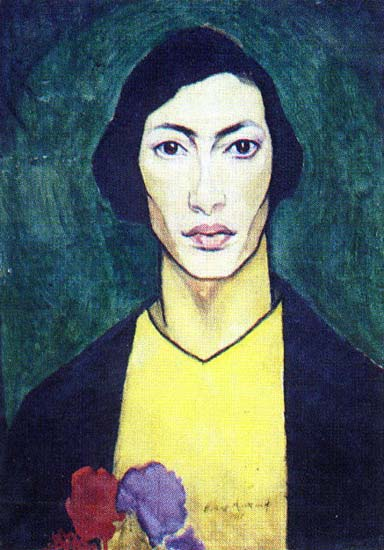
Nathan Altman

== See also ==
- List of Russian artists
- List of painters of Leningrad Union of Artists
- Saint Petersburg Union of Artists
- Russian culture

== Sources ==
- Выставка произведений ленинградских художников, посвященная 25-летию Победы над фашистской Германией. Каталог. Л., Художник РСФСР, 1972.
- Четвертая Республиканская художественная выставка «Советская Россия». Каталог. — М: Советский художник, 1970.
- Е. Щеглов. Эпоха Ленина в творчестве художников России // Советская культура, 1970, 28 февраля.
- Ю. Нехорошев. Юбилейная ленинская // Известия, 1970, 29 апреля.
- Губарев А., Дмитренко А. В простом, казалось бы, мотиве ... // Вечерний Ленинград, 1971, 5 января.
- Шишло Б. Что вдохновляло художников. Размышления в связи с осенней выставкой. // Смена, 1971, 7 января.
- «1870-1970. В. И. Ленину посвящается». Выставка произведений ленинградских художников. — Л: Художник РСФСР, 1970.
- Осенняя выставка произведений ленинградских художников 1970 года. Каталог. — Л: Художник РСФСР, 1972.
- Artists of Peoples of the USSR. Biography Dictionary. Vol. 1. Moscow, Iskusstvo, 1970.
- Artists of Peoples of the USSR. Biography Dictionary. Vol. 2. Moscow, Iskusstvo, 1972.
- Directory of Members of Union of Artists of USSR. Volume 1,2. Moscow, Soviet Artist Edition, 1979.
- Directory of Members of the Leningrad branch of the Union of Artists of Russian Federation. Leningrad, Khudozhnik RSFSR, 1980.
- Artists of Peoples of the USSR. Biography Dictionary. Vol. 4 Book 1. Moscow, Iskusstvo, 1983.
- Directory of Members of the Leningrad branch of the Union of Artists of Russian Federation. - Leningrad: Khudozhnik RSFSR, 1987.
- Artists of peoples of the USSR. Biography Dictionary. Vol. 4 Book 2. - Saint Petersburg: Academic project humanitarian agency, 1995.
- Link of Times: 1932 - 1997. Artists - Members of Saint Petersburg Union of Artists of Russia. Exhibition catalogue. - Saint Petersburg: Manezh Central Exhibition Hall, 1997.
- Matthew C. Bown. Dictionary of 20th Century Russian and Soviet Painters 1900-1980s. - London: Izomar, 1998.
- Vern G. Swanson. Soviet Impressionism. - Woodbridge, England: Antique Collectors' Club, 2001.
- Время перемен. Искусство 1960—1985 в Советском Союзе. СПб., Государственный Русский музей, 2006.
- Sergei V. Ivanov. Unknown Socialist Realism. The Leningrad School. - Saint-Petersburg: NP-Print Edition, 2007. - ISBN 5-901724-21-6, ISBN 978-5-901724-21-7.
- Anniversary Directory graduates of Saint Petersburg State Academic Institute of Painting, Sculpture, and Architecture named after Ilya Repin, Russian Academy of Arts. 1915 - 2005. - Saint Petersburg: Pervotsvet Publishing House, 2007.
