= 1958 in fine arts of the Soviet Union =

The year 1958 was marked by many events that left an imprint on the history of Soviet and Russian Fine Arts.

== Events ==
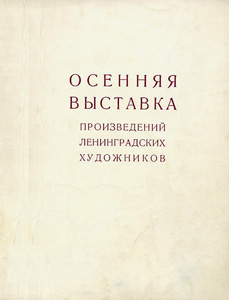
Exhibition Catalogue

- February 21 - The exhibition "40 years of the Soviet Armed Forces" opened in Moscow in the halls of the USSR Academy of Arts. The exhibition was attended by 294 artists, exhibited 518 works of painting, sculpture and graphics. The participants were Mikhail Avilov, Isaak Brodsky, Rudolf Frentz, Aleksandr Gerasimov, Igor Grabar, Aleksandr Deyneka, Boris Ioganson, Yuri Neprintsev, Nikolai Timkov, Maria Zubreeva, and other important Soviet artists.
- The "Autumn Exhibition of works by Leningrad artists of 1958" was opened in Exhibition Halls of the Leningrad Union of Artists. The participants were Taisia Afonina, Irina Baldina, Evgenia Baykova, Vsevolod Bazhenov, Piotr Belousov, Yuri Belov, Zlata Bizova, Sergei Frolov, Nikolai Galakhov, Elena Gorokhova, Abram Grushko, Alexei Eriomin, Mikhail Kaneev, Marina Kozlovskaya, Tatiana Kopnina, Boris Korneev, Alexander Koroviakov, Elena Kostenko, Nikolai Kostrov, Anna Kostrova, Gevork Kotiantz, Yaroslav Krestovsky, Valeria Larina, Boris Lavrenko, Ivan Lavsky, Piotr Litvinsky, Oleg Lomakin, Dmitry Maevsky, Gavriil Malish, Alexei Mozhaev, Evsey Moiseenko, Nikolai Mukho, Anatoli Nenartovich, Yuri Neprintsev, Dmitry Oboznenko, Sergei Osipov, Vladimir Ovchinnikov, Nikolai Pozdneev, Alexander Pushnin, Maria Rudnitskaya, Galina Rumiantseva, Lev Russov, Ivan Savenko, Gleb Savinov, Alexander Samokhvalov, Arseny Semionov, Alexander Semionov, Yuri Shablikin, Boris Shamanov, Alexander Shmidt, Nadezhda Shteinmiller, Elena Skuin, Alexander Sokolov, Nikolai Timkov, Yuri Tulin, Ivan Varichev, Anatoli Vasiliev, Piotr Vasiliev, Igor Veselkin, Vecheslav Zagonek, and other important Leningrad artists.

== Deaths ==
- April 11 - Konstantin Yuon (born 1875), Russian Soviet painter and theatre designer associated with the Mir Iskusstva. Later, he co-founded the Union of Russian Artists and the Association of Artists of Revolutionary Russia.
- May 6 - Nikolay Krymov (born 1884), Russian Soviet painter and art theoretician, People's Artist of Russian Federation.
- September 28 - Vasily Baksheev (born 1862), Russian Soviet painter, People's Artist of Russian Federation.
- October 1 - Robert Falk (born 1886), Russian painter.
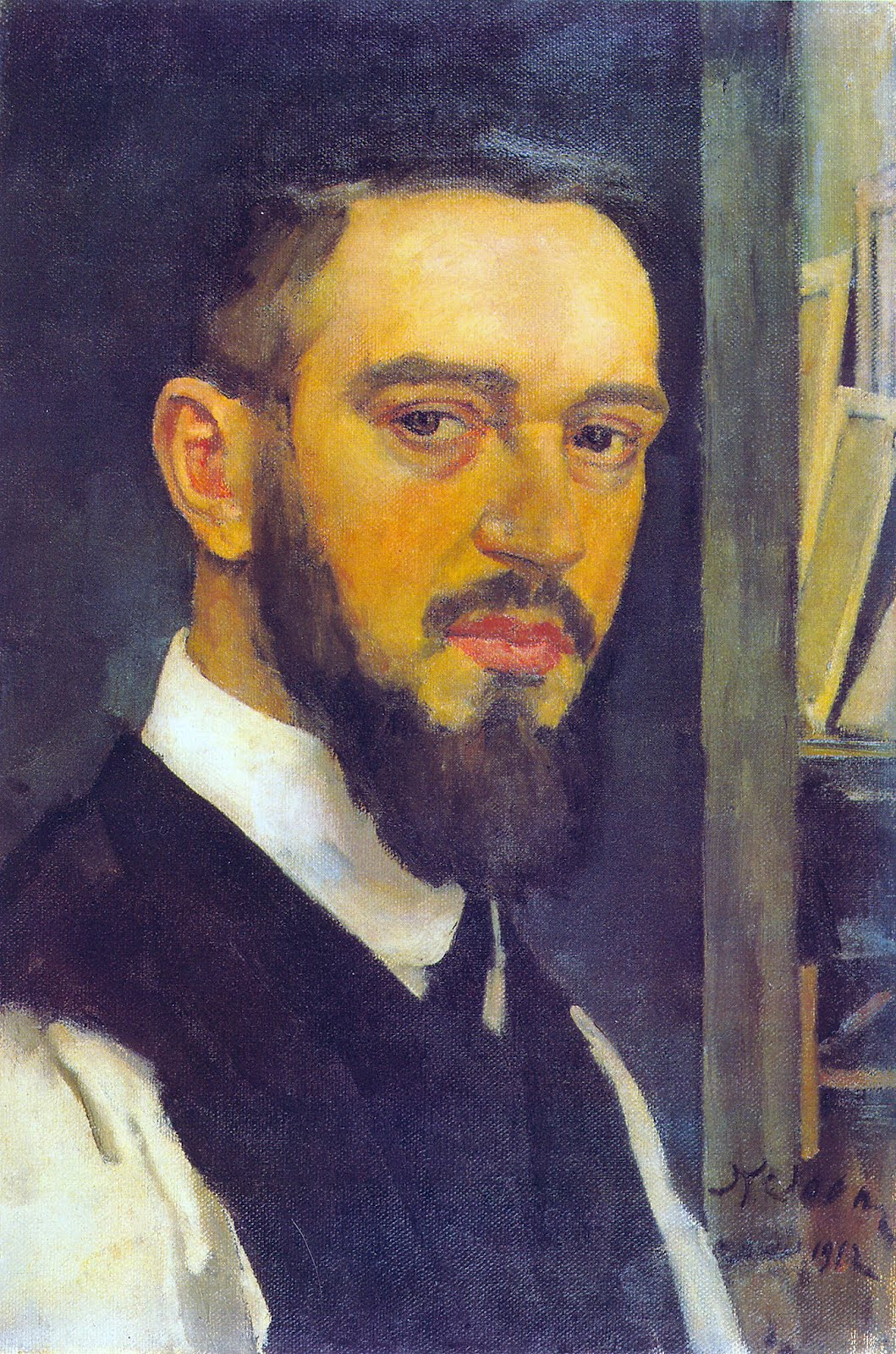
Konstantin Yuon – Self-portrait

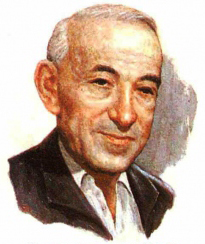
Nikolay Krymov

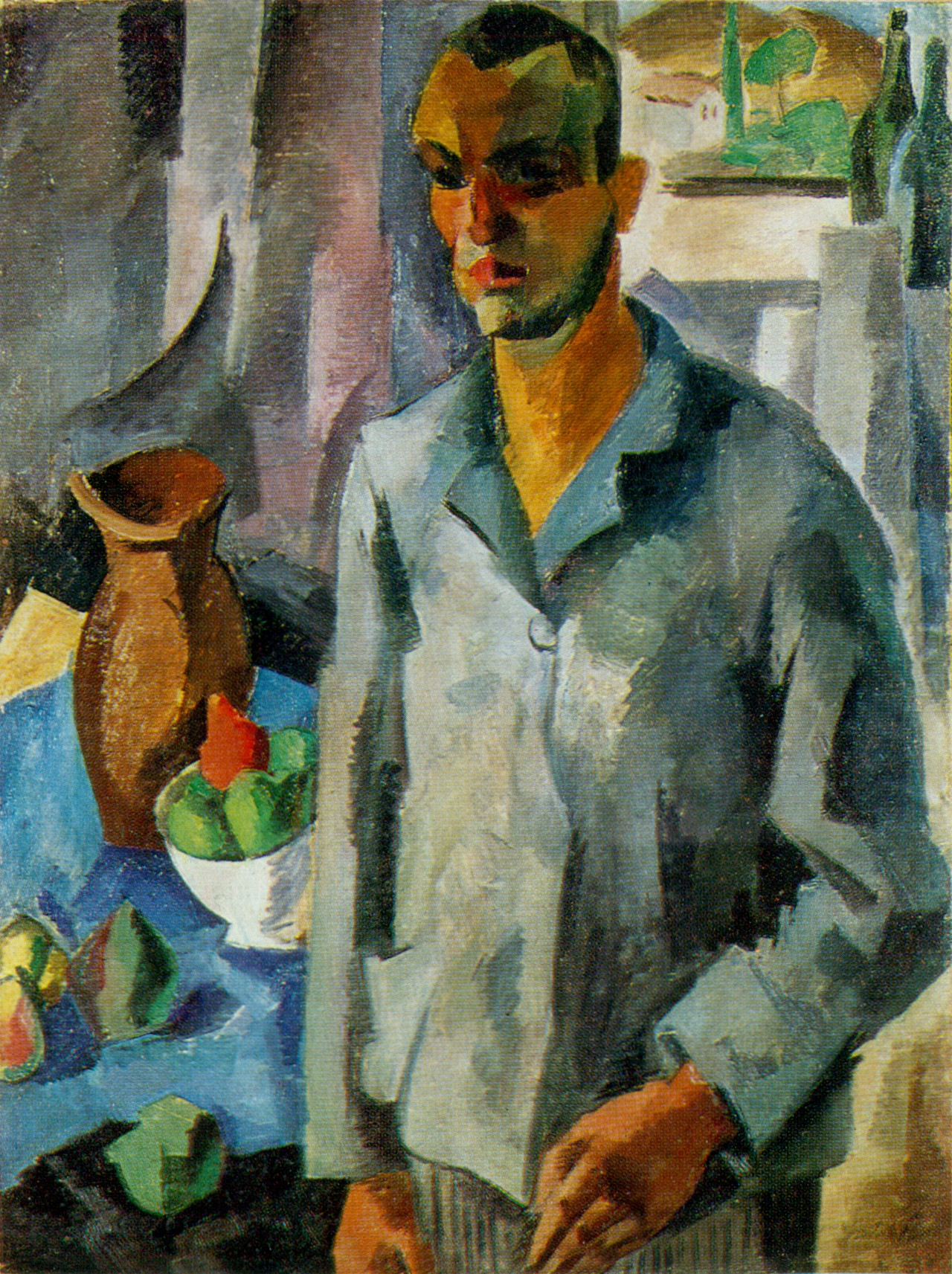
Robert Falk - Self Portrait Against a Window (1916)

== See also ==
- List of Russian artists
- List of painters of Leningrad Union of Artists
- Saint Petersburg Union of Artists
- Russian culture
- 1958 in the Soviet Union

== Sources ==
- Autumn Exhibition of works by Leningrad artists of 1958. Exhibition Catalogue. - Leningrad: Khudozhnik RSFSR, 1959.
- Artists of peoples of the USSR. Biography Dictionary. Volume 1. - Moscow: Iskusstvo, 1970.
- Artists of peoples of the USSR. Biography Dictionary. Volume 2. - Moscow: Iskusstvo, 1972.
- Directory of Members of Union of Artists of USSR. Volume 1,2. - Moscow: Soviet Artist Edition, 1979.
- Directory of Members of the Leningrad branch of the Union of Artists of Russian Federation. - Leningrad: Khudozhnik RSFSR, 1980.
- Artists of peoples of the USSR. Biography Dictionary. Volume 4 Book 1. - Moscow: Iskusstvo, 1983.
- Directory of Members of the Leningrad branch of the Union of Artists of Russian Federation. - Leningrad: Khudozhnik RSFSR, 1987.
- Artists of peoples of the USSR. Biography Dictionary. Volume 4 Book 2. - Saint Petersburg: Academic project humanitarian agency, 1995.
- Matthew C. Bown. Dictionary of 20th Century Russian and Soviet Painters 1900-1980s. - London: Izomar, 1998.
- Vern G. Swanson. Soviet Impressionism. - Woodbridge, England: Antique Collectors' Club, 2001.
- Sergei V. Ivanov. Unknown Socialist Realism. The Leningrad School. - Saint-Petersburg: NP-Print Edition, 2007. - ISBN 5-901724-21-6, ISBN 978-5-901724-21-7.
- Anniversary Directory graduates of Saint Petersburg State Academic Institute of Painting, Sculpture, and Architecture named after Ilya Repin, Russian Academy of Arts. 1915 - 2005. - Saint Petersburg: Pervotsvet Publishing House, 2007.
- Igor N. Pishny. The Leningrad School of painting. Socialist realism of 1930-1980s: Selected names. – Saint Petersburg: Kolomenskaya versta, 2008. - ISBN 978-5-91555-005-5.
