= 1975 in fine arts of the Soviet Union =

The year 1975 was marked by many events that left an imprint on the history of Soviet and Russian Fine Arts.

== Events ==
- Exhibition of works by Alexander Samokhvalov (1894–1971) dedicated to 80th Anniversary was opened in the Russian museum.

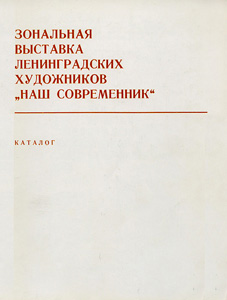
Exhibition Catalog

- "Our Contemporary" Regional Art Exhibition of Leningrad artists was opened in the Russian museum. The participants were Evgenia Antipova, Taisia Afonina, Vsevolod Bazhenov, Irina Baldina, Nikolai Baskakov, Piotr Belousov, Olga Bogaevskaya, Veniamin Borisov, Zlata Bizova, Nikolai Galakhov, Vasily Golubev, Elena Gorokhova, Abram Grushko, Irina Dobrekova, Alexei Eriomin, Mikhail Kaneev, Yuri Khukhrov, Mikhail Kozell, Marina Kozlovskaya, Engels Kozlov, Maya Kopitseva, Boris Korneev, Elena Kostenko, Nikolai Kostrov, Anna Kostrova, Gevork Kotiantz, Vladimir Krantz, Yaroslav Krestovsky, Boris Lavrenko, Oleg Lomakin, Dmitry Maevsky, Gavriil Malish, Evsey Moiseenko, Piotr Nazarov, Vera Nazina, Mikhail Natarevich, Yuri Neprintsev, Samuil Nevelshtein, Dmitry Oboznenko, Sergei Osipov, Vladimir Ovchinnikov, Nikolai Pozdneev, Alexander Pushnin, Galina Rumiantseva, Kapitolina Rumiantseva, Ivan Savenko, Gleb Savinov, Vladimir Sakson, Alexander Samokhvalov, Arseny Semionov, Alexander Semionov, Yuri Shablikin, Boris Shamanov, Alexander Shmidt, Nadezhda Shteinmiller, Elena Skuin, Galina Smirnova, Alexander Stolbov, Victor Teterin, Nikolai Timkov, Leonid Tkachenko, Mikhail Trufanov, Yuri Tulin, Vitaly Tulenev, Ivan Varichev, Anatoli Vasiliev, Igor Veselkin, Valery Vatenin, Lazar Yazgur, Vecheslav Zagonek, and other important Leningrad artists.
- Exhibition of works by Boris Korneev (1922–1974) was opened in the Museum of the Academy of Arts in Leningrad.

== Deaths ==
- 27 февраля — Oscar Klever (Russian: Клевер Оскар Юльевич), Russian soviet painter, graphic artist, and theatre artist (b. 1887).
- 1 марта — Sofia Zaklikovskaya (Russian: Закликовская Софья Людвиговна), Russian soviet painter and graphic artist (b. 1889).
- 15 марта — Vladimir Avlas (Russian: Авлас Владимир Дмитриевич), Russian soviet painter (b. 1904).

== See also ==
- List of Russian artists
- List of painters of Leningrad Union of Artists
- Saint Petersburg Union of Artists
- Russian culture

== Sources ==
- Выставка произведений ленинградских художников, посвященная 30-летию Победы советского народа в Великой Отечественной войне. Каталог. Л., Художник РСФСР, 1978.
- Яковлева Л. Величие подвига // Вечерний Ленинград, 1975, 27 мая.
- Мямлин И. Сердце с правдой вдвоём... // Ленинградская правда, 1975, 1 июня.
- Зональная выставка произведений ленинградских художников «Наш современник». 1975 год. Каталог. Л., Художник РСФСР, 1980.
- Дмитренко А. Мир современника // Ленинградская правда, 1975, 12 октября.
- Губарев А. На полотнах – человек труда. Выставка «Наш современник» // Ленинградский рабочий, 1975, 11 октября.
- Богданов А. О людях труда // Вечерний Ленинград, 1975, 3 ноября.
- Вишняков Б. Девиз: Наш современник. Заметки с V Республиканской выставки «Советская Россия» // Правда, 1975, 7 декабря.
- Аникушин М. Создавать произведения, созвучные эпохе // Ленинградская правда, 1976, 9 января.
- Леняшин В. Думая о будущем. Время. Художник. Творчество // Вечерний Ленинград, 1976, 26 января.
- Пятая Республиканская выставка «Советская Россия». Каталог. М., Советский художник, 1975.
- Выставка произведений художников — женщин Ленинграда. 1975 год. Каталог. Л., Художник РСФСР, 1979.
- Малыш Гавриил Кондратьевич. Выставка произведений. Каталог. Л., Художник РСФСР, 1975.
- Кабачек Леонид Васильевич. Каталог выставки произведений.. Л., Художник РСФСР, 1975.
- Борис Васильевич Корнеев. Каталог выставки произведений.. Л., Художник РСФСР, 1975.
- Artists of Peoples of the USSR. Biobibliography Dictionary. Vol. 1. Moscow, Iskusstvo, 1970.
- Artists of Peoples of the USSR. Biobibliography Dictionary. Vol. 2. Moscow, Iskusstvo, 1972.
- Directory of Members of Union of Artists of USSR. Volume 1,2. Moscow, Soviet Artist Edition, 1979.
- Directory of Members of the Leningrad branch of the Union of Artists of Russian Federation. Leningrad, Khudozhnik RSFSR, 1980.
- Artists of Peoples of the USSR. Biobibliography Dictionary. Vol. 4 Book 1. Moscow, Iskusstvo, 1983.
- Directory of Members of the Leningrad branch of the Union of Artists of Russian Federation. – Leningrad: Khudozhnik RSFSR, 1987.
- Artists of peoples of the USSR. Biobibliography Dictionary. Vol. 4 Book 2. – Saint Petersburg: Academic project humanitarian agency, 1995.
- Link of Times: 1932 – 1997. Artists – Members of Saint Petersburg Union of Artists of Russia. Exhibition catalogue. – Saint Petersburg: Manezh Central Exhibition Hall, 1997.
- Matthew C. Bown. Dictionary of 20th Century Russian and Soviet Painters 1900-1980s. – London: Izomar, 1998.
- Vern G. Swanson. Soviet Impressionism. – Woodbridge, England: Antique Collectors' Club, 2001.
- Петр Фомин. Живопись. Воспоминания современников. СПб., 2002. С.107.
- Время перемен. Искусство 1960—1985 в Советском Союзе. СПб., Государственный Русский музей, 2006.
- Sergei V. Ivanov. Unknown Socialist Realism. The Leningrad School. – Saint-Petersburg: NP-Print Edition, 2007. – ISBN 5-901724-21-6, ISBN 978-5-901724-21-7.
- Anniversary Directory graduates of Saint Petersburg State Academic Institute of Painting, Sculpture, and Architecture named after Ilya Repin, Russian Academy of Arts. 1915 – 2005. – Saint Petersburg: Pervotsvet Publishing House, 2007.
