= 1962 in fine arts of the Soviet Union =

The year 1962 was marked by many events that left an imprint on the history of Soviet and Russian Fine Arts.

== Events ==
- An exhibition to the 30 years of Moscow Union of Artists was opened in Moscow in the «Manezh» Central Exhibition Hall.
- Solo Exhibition of works by Nikolai Kostrov was opened in the Leningrad Union of Artists.
- The Exhibition of Soviet Fine Art was opened in Budapest, Hungary.
- The Exhibition of Soviet Fine Art was opened in Belgrade, Yugoslavia.
- The Autumn Exhibition of Leningrad artists of 1962 was opened in Leningrad in the State Russian Museum. The participants were Piotr Alberti, Evgenia Antipova, Taisia Afonina, Sergei Babkov, Irina Baldina, Nikolai Baskakov, Vsevolod Bazhenov, Yuri Belov, Dmitry Belyaev, Olga Bogaevskaya, Nikolai Galakhov, Ivan Godlevsky, Vladimir Gorb, Abram Grushko, Alexei Eremin, Mikhail Kaneev, Maria Kleschar-Samokhvalova, Maya Kopitseva, Boris Korneev, Alexander Koroviakov, Victor Korovin, Elena Kostenko, Gevork Kotiantz, Mikhail Kozell, Engels Kozlov, Marina Kozlovskaya, Yaroslav Krestovsky, Valeria Larina, Boris Lavrenko, Ivan Lavsky, Anatoli Levitin, Oleg Lomakin, Gavriil Malish, Boris Maluev, Evsey Moiseenko, Nikolai Mukho, Piotr Nazarov, Vera Nazina, Mikhail Natarevich, Yaroslav Nikolaev, Dmitry Oboznenko, Lev Orekhov, Lia Ostrova, Vladimir Ovchinnikov, Sergei Osipov, Genrikh Pavlovsky, Varlen Pen, Nikolai Pozdneev, Stepan Privedentsev, Semion Rotnitsky, Galina Rumiantseva, Ivan Savenko, Gleb Savinov, Alexander Semionov, Arseny Semionov, Nadezhda Shteinmiller, Elena Skuin, Kim Slavin, Alexander Sokolov, Alexander Stolbov, Alexander Tatarenko, Victor Teterin, Nikolai Timkov, Mikhail Trufanov, Yuri Tulin, Boris Ugarov, Ivan Varichev, Anatoli Vasiliev, Valery Vatenin, Rostislav Vovkushevsky, Vecheslav Zagonek, Elena Zhukova, and other important Leningrad artists.
- A sculptor Mikhail Anikushin is select Chairman of the Leningrad Union of Artists.
- A painter Vladimir Serov is select President of Academy of arts of the USSR.

== Deaths ==
- August 17 — Mikhail Cheremnykh (Russian: Черемных Михаил Михайлович), Russian soviet graphic artists, People's Artist of the Russian Federation, Stalin Prize winner (born 1890).
- October 17 — Natalia Goncharova (Russian: Гончарова Наталья Сергеевна), Russian advance-guard artist, from 1915 living in France (born 1881).
- October 24 — Nikolai Dormidontov (Russian: Дормидонтов Николай Иванович), Russian soviet painter and graphic artists (born 1898).
- December 19 — Georgy Vereisky (Russian: Верейский Георгий Семёнович), Russian soviet painter and graphic artists, People's Artist of the Russian Federation, Stalin Prize winner (born 1886).

== Gallery of 1962 ==
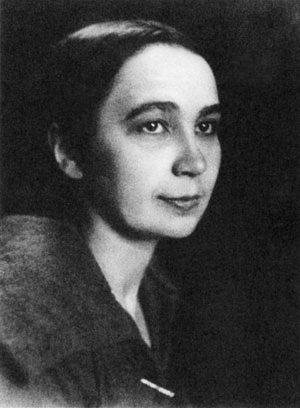
Natalia Goncharova

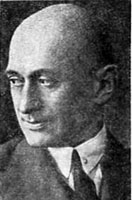
Georgy Vereisky

== See also ==
- List of Russian artists
- List of painters of Leningrad Union of Artists
- Saint Petersburg Union of Artists
- Russian culture
- 1962 in the Soviet Union

== Sources ==
- Осенняя выставка произведений ленинградских художников 1962 года. Каталог. — Л: Художник РСФСР, 1962.
- Николай Костров. Выставка акварелей и рисунков. Л., Художник РСФСР, 1962.
- Artists of Peoples of the USSR. Biography Dictionary. Vol. 1. Moscow, Iskusstvo, 1970.
- Artists of Peoples of the USSR. Biography Dictionary. Vol. 2. Moscow, Iskusstvo, 1972.
- Directory of Members of Union of Artists of USSR. Volume 1,2. Moscow, Soviet Artist Edition, 1979.
- Directory of Members of the Leningrad branch of the Union of Artists of Russian Federation. Leningrad, Khudozhnik RSFSR, 1980.
- Artists of Peoples of the USSR. Biography Dictionary. Vol. 4 Book 1. Moscow, Iskusstvo, 1983.
- Directory of Members of the Leningrad branch of the Union of Artists of Russian Federation. - Leningrad: Khudozhnik RSFSR, 1987.
- Artists of peoples of the USSR. Biography Dictionary. Vol. 4 Book 2. - Saint Petersburg: Academic project humanitarian agency, 1995.
- Link of Times: 1932 - 1997. Artists - Members of Saint Petersburg Union of Artists of Russia. Exhibition catalogue. - Saint Petersburg: Manezh Central Exhibition Hall, 1997.
- Matthew C. Bown. Dictionary of 20th Century Russian and Soviet Painters 1900-1980s. - London: Izomar, 1998.
- Vern G. Swanson. Soviet Impressionism. - Woodbridge, England: Antique Collectors' Club, 2001.
- Sergei V. Ivanov. Unknown Socialist Realism. The Leningrad School. - Saint-Petersburg: NP-Print Edition, 2007. - ISBN 5-901724-21-6, ISBN 978-5-901724-21-7.
- Anniversary Directory graduates of Saint Petersburg State Academic Institute of Painting, Sculpture, and Architecture named after Ilya Repin, Russian Academy of Arts. 1915 - 2005. - Saint Petersburg: Pervotsvet Publishing House, 2007.
