= Vladimir Chekalov =

Russian artist

Vladimir Fedorovich Chekalov
- Born: July 6, 1922; Novaya-Vyaltsevo, Soligalichsky District, Kostroma Oblast, RSFSR
- Died: June 4, 1992 (aged 69); Saint Petersburg, Russia
- Education: Repin Institute of Arts
- Known for: Painting, Art Education
- Movement: Realism
- Awards: Order of Red Star; Order of the Patriotic War

Vladimir Fedorovich Chekalov (Russian: Влади́мир Фё́дорович Чека́лов; July 6, 1922 – June 4, 1992) was a Russian Soviet realist painter and art teacher, who lived and worked in Leningrad. He was a member of the Leningrad Union of Artists, and regarded as a representative of the Leningrad school of painting, most famous for his battle and genre paintings.

== Biography ==
Vladimir Fedorovich Chekalov was born July 6, 1922, in the village of Novaya-Vyaltsevo, Sologalich county of Kostroma Province in the Soviet Russia.

In 1926 his family moved to Leningrad. In 1936, Vladimir Chekalov went to the Secondary Art School at the All-Russian Academy of Arts. His teachers included noted art educators Pavel Naumov, Alexander Zaitsev, Samuil Nevelshtein, and Mikhail Natarevich.

In July 1941, Vladimir Chekalov was drafted into the Red Army and took part in the Great Patriotic War. As a sapper, he participated in the Battle of Stalingrad; he was wounded and marked by military awards.

In 1944–1945, he took part in the liberation of the Nazi occupation of Romania, Bulgaria, Hungary, Yugoslavia, and Austria as a part of the 3rd Ukrainian Front. During the war, he lost all of his family: his parents died in the siege of Leningrad, two elder brothers were killed at the front.

After demobilization in October 1946, Vladimir Chekalov entered the first course offered by the Department of Painting at the Repin Institute of Arts. There he studied under Alexander Zaytsev, Boris Fogel, Genrikh Pavlovsky, Lija Ostrova, Semion Abugov, Mikhail Platunov, and Joseph Serebriany.

In 1952, Vladimir Chekalov graduated from the Leningrad Institute of Painting, Sculpture and Architecture as a painter in Rudolf Frentz's workshop, together with Sergei Babkov, Leonid Baykov, Irina Baldina, Dmitry Beliaev, Abram Grushko, Marina Kozlovskaya, Boris Korneev, Elena Kostenko, Oleg Lomakin, Piotr Fomin, Boris Lavrenko, and other young artists. His graduation work was a genre painting named Soldier Kitchen, devoted to the life in a town newly liberated from Nazi Germany.

At the end of 1952, Vladimir Chekalov's graduation work was exhibited in Moscow at the All-Union Exhibition of graduation works of students from art institutes. In February 1953, the magazine Soviet Union placed a full-page spread color reproductions of paintings and an article about the author that brought the young artist to fame.

Vladimir Chekalov participated in art exhibitions since 1952, mainly working on battle paintings and genre compositions. Much of his works depicted a Russian soldier.

His works in the 1950s and 1960s included Countrymen, News from the Motherland, On a halt. In Bulgaria, Fight the Black Sea Fleet sailors at the Eltigen. Much of his works in this time period depicted a Russian soldier and employed the soldier's heroism as the main theme.

Vladimir Chekalov aksi painted a large number of life sketches, many of which are examples of realistic painting.

From the late 1950s through the 1960s, Vladimir Chekalov partook in creative journey to the Crimea, working in the town of Old Ladoga at the Academic dacha. He spent a lot of time with landscape paintings, with a focus of the color, and the state of lighting and surrounding air.

Since 1953, Vladimir Chekalov was a member of the Leningrad Union of Artists. In the 1970s and 1980s, he taught at art school for deaf children in Pavlovsk, near Leningrad.

Vladimir Fedorovich Chekalov died in Saint Petersburg in 1992. His paintings now reside in art museums and private collections in Russia, France, England, Germany, Italy, the United States, and others.

== Honours and awards ==
- Order of the Red Star
- Order of the Patriotic War, 2nd Class, twice
- Medal "For the Victory over Germany in the Great Patriotic War 1941–1945"
- Medal "For the Defence of Stalingrad"
- Medal "For the Capture of Vienna"
- Medal "For the Capture of Budapest"
- Medal "For the Liberation of Belgrade"

== See also ==
- Fine Art of Leningrad
- Leningrad School of Painting
- List of painters of Saint Petersburg Union of Artists
- Saint Petersburg Union of Artists

== Bibliography ==
- 1917 — 1957. Выставка произведений ленинградских художников. Каталог. — Л: Ленинградский художник, 1958. — с.34.
- Выставка произведений ленинградских художников 1960 года. Каталог. — Л: Художник РСФСР, 1961. — с.45.
- Двести лет Академии художеств СССР. Каталог выставки. — Л.-М.: Искусство, 1958. — с.176.
- Ленинград. Зональная выставка. — Л: Художник РСФСР, 1965. — с.61.
- Справочник членов Союза художников СССР. Том 2. — М: Советский художник, 1979. — с. 541. — 644 с.
- Выставки советского изобразительного искусства. Справочник. Том 5. 1954—1958 годы. — М: Советский художник, 1981. — с. 48, 195, 387. — 964 с.
- Справочник членов Ленинградской организации Союза художников РСФСР. -Л: Художник РСФСР, 1987. — с. 143. — 160 с.
- Ленинградские художники. Живопись 1950—1980 годов. Каталог. — Санкт-Петербург: Выставочный центр Санкт-Петербургского Союза художников, 1994. — с.4.
- Этюд в творчестве ленинградских художников. Выставка произведений. Каталог. — Санкт — Петербург: Мемориальный музей Н. А. Некрасова, 1994. — с.6.
- Лирика в произведениях художников военного поколения. Выставка произведений. Каталог. — Санкт-Петербург: Мемориальный музей Н. А. Некрасова, 1995. — с.6.
- Живопись 1940—1990 годов. Ленинградская школа. Выставка произведений. — Санкт-Петербург: Мемориальный музей Н. А. Некрасова, 1996. — с.4.
- Soviet Union Journal. - 1953: issue 2 (36).
- Sergei V. Ivanov. Unknown Socialist Realism. The Leningrad School. - Saint Petersburg: NP-Print Edition, 2007. – pp. 9, 15, 18, 20, 24, 27, 29, 31, 42, 90, 364, 389–401, 403–406, 414–424, 439. ISBN 5-901724-21-6, ISBN 978-5-901724-21-7.
