= Vsevolod Bazhenov =

Russian painter

Vsevolod Andreevich Bazhenov
- Born: February 18, 1909; Serdobsk, Serdobsky Uyezd, Saratov Governorate, Russian Empire
- Died: August 2, 1986 (aged 77); Leningrad, USSR
- Education: Tavricheskaya Art School
- Known for: Painting
- Movement: Realism
- Awards: Medal For the Victory Over Germany; Order of the Patriotic War; Jubilee Medal "In Commemoration of the 100th Anniversary of the Birth of Vladimir Ilyich Lenin"; Jubilee Medal "Twenty Years of Victory in the Great Patriotic War 1941–1945"; Jubilee Medal "Thirty Years of Victory in the Great Patriotic War 1941–1945"; Jubilee Medal "Forty Years of Victory in the Great Patriotic War 1941–1945"; Jubilee Medal "50 Years of the Armed Forces of the USSR"; Jubilee Medal "60 Years of the Armed Forces of the USSR"

Vsevolod Andreevich Bazhenov (Russian: Все́волод Андре́евич Баже́нов; February 18, 1909 – August 2, 1986) was a Soviet, Russian painter who lived and worked in Leningrad. He was a member of the Leningrad branch of Union of Artists of Russian Federation, and regarded as a known representative of the Leningrad school of painting, most known for his landscape paintings. He was born into an artistic family and his father was his first teacher.

== Biography ==
Vsevolod Andreevich Bazhenov was born on February 18, 1909, in the town Serdobsk, in the Saratov Governorate of the Russian Empire into an artistic family. His father was an artist and taught in a real school. He became the first teacher of Vsevolod. Later he studied in Serdobsk art studio of artists A. Gofert and N. Kuzmin. Besides drawing and painting, Bazhenov was a music lover. His mother Evgenia Nikovaevna was a pianist.

Bazhenov graduated high school in 1928 and moved to Leningrad. Between the years of 1928-1930 he studied at the Tavricheskaya Art School, where he was a student of Mikhail Avilov, David Kiplyck, and Vladimir Fedorovich. In 1930 Bazhenov left the third-year college courses and arrived at the surveyors. According to some sources, the reason for his leaving was a difficult financial situation or the reorganization of the department of painting. After leaving the course, Bazhenov worked in exploration, first as a surveyor, then as a superintendent and chief of field parties. During expeditions, he painted many sketches of life in the Ural Region, Armenia, Khibiny, Karelia, the Caucasus and Kurdistan. From 1934 to 1941, Bazhenov worked at the Leningrad mapping factory.

In 1940 he married Catherine Andreyevna Kuznetsova. His eldest son Alexander was born June 24, 1941, and later became a filmmaker.

After the beginning of the Great Patriotic War, Bazhenov and his family were sent to Sverdlovsk city for specialty. In December 1942 he was drafted into the Red Army with the rank of lieutenant-technique as a senior cartographer. Bazhenov was discharged at the end of 1945, and awarded the Medal "For the Victory over Germany in the Great Patriotic War 1941–1945".

In late 1945 Bazhenov returned to Leningrad. From the autumn of 1946 he worked as painter for hire in LenIzo. In 1946, his middle son Vladimir was born, followed in 1952 by his youngest Andrew.

Bazhenov is first referred to in art exhibitions dating from 1937. After 1951, he was constantly involved in Leningrad, Republican, and All-Union exhibitions of soviet artists, including the All-Union Art Exhibition of 1957 in Moscow, devoted to the 40th Anniversary of the October Revolution. His plaintings included landscapes, genre scenes, seascapes, still lifes, works in oil and tempera paintings.

In the 1950s, Bazhenov made some long trips around the country to gather materials for paintings, including East and West Siberia, Altai Province and the Ural Region. As a result of these trips, Bazhenov was considered a leading master of nature studies in Leningrad. In 1951, Bazhenov was admitted to the Leningrad Union of Artists.

Among his works of the 1950s and early 1960s "Fishermen" (1949), "Arable land" (1950), "Mstinskoe reservoir", "Early Spring" (both 1951), "Spring Evening" (1953), "Altai-Chemal", "Winter Morning", "Before the Storm", "The Sun hid behind the mountain" (all 1956), "Blue Altai", "Industrial Lights", "Ploughing virgin land in the mountains" (both 1957), "On the bank of Selenga", "On the Barguzin River", "Baykal Lake. The Gull's Island" (all 1958), "Neva Industrial" (1959), "Near Leningrad", "Twilight", "The launching of the tanker Beijing" (1960), "Sunrise", "Lights of Angara River", "Siberian route" (all 1961), "Leningrad port", "Volkhov River", "Old Ladoga" (all 1964), "Winter Sketch", "Spring in the Forest" (both 1965), and others.

In 1962 Bazhenov embarked on a working voyage aboard the ship "Eugene Nikishin", sailing from Leningrad to Vladivostok and around Europe and Asia with stops in ports of Gibraltar, Suez, Singapore and Vietnam. During the course of the voyage, which took him through eleven seas and oceans, and lasted more than three months, Bazhenov created nearly two hundred sketches, paintings and drawings. His nature sketches and direct impressions of the voyage led to larger works, finished later in his Leningrad art studio.

After his return in 1963, about 120 works from this series of sketches and paintings were first exhibited in Leningrad, and following that, in other cities. Among them are the works [[:|"Arabian Coast"]], "Boats at the Sea", [[:|"In the Singapore Strait"]], [[:|"Denmark on the horizon"]], [[:|"In the Ha Long Bay"]], "Dolphins play", "Suez Canal", and others.

During the 1960s and 1970s, Bazhenov worked with a group of Leningrad artists, and painted pictures for the mess rooms of ocean-going ships and submarines. He create about 100 paintings for ships of various purposes, mostly landscapes of his country. Most of these works were installed on the warships of the Pacific and Northern fleets. He also took part in the creation of special technologies for protecting pictures from the high humidity of a long-time voyage. In 1976, the artist was awarded the commendation of the Navy of the USSR for this job.

Since the mid-1960s for twenty years Bazhenov was the head of a creative group of artists in the House of creativity «Staraya Ladoga» in Staraya Ladoga. Here he painted many sketches and paintings, among them "Winter Sketch", "March in the House of Creativity", "Spring Sketch" (all 1967), "By the spring" (1969), "Spring is on the way" (1974), [[:|"The House of Artistic Creativity Staraya Ladoga"]], "Last Snow" (both 1977), "A March" (1980), [[:|"In spring at the Volkhov River"]] (1981), and others.

Bazhenov visited Karelia for the first time in 1931. Of the artist's creative journeys, it has been said that Karelia was one of his most special locations. In 1981 he first visited Valaam island, at the invitation of the local museum. From then until death Valaam was one of the main themes of his work. In 1984 the Valaam museum held a solo exhibition of paintings by Vsevolod Bazhenov. In its archives are kept many paintings based on impressions from visiting the island.

Vsevolod Andreevich Bazhenov died on August 2, 1986, in Leningrad aged seventy-eight. He is remembered mostly for his landscapes, seascapes, and small-format nature studies. His personal exhibitions were in Leningrad (1963, 1982), and Saint Petersburg (1994, 2009). His paintings reside in the Russian State Museum, in art museums and private collections in Russia, Japan, France, England, in the U.S., China, and throughout the world

== See also ==
- Fine Art of Leningrad
- Leningrad School of Painting
- House of creativity «Staraya Ladoga»
- List of Russian artists
- List of 20th-century Russian painters
- List of painters of Saint Petersburg Union of Artists
- List of the Russian Landscape painters
- Saint Petersburg Union of Artists

== Principal exhibitions ==
- 1950 (Leningrad): Exhibition of works by Leningrad artists of 1950
- 1951 (Leningrad): Exhibition of works by Leningrad artists of 1951
- 1956 (Leningrad): The Fall Exhibition of works by Leningrad artists of 1956
- 1957 (Leningrad): 1917 - 1957. Leningrad Artist's works of Art Exhibition
- 1957 (Moscow): All-Union Art Exhibition of 1957 dedicated to the 40th Anniversary of October Revolution
- 1958 (Leningrad): The Fall Exhibition of works by Leningrad artists of 1958
- 1960 (Leningrad): Exhibition of works by Leningrad artists of 1960
- 1960 (Leningrad): Exhibition of works by Leningrad artists of 1960
- 1961 (Leningrad): Exhibition of works by Leningrad artists of 1961
- 1962 (Leningrad): The Fall Exhibition of works by Leningrad artists of 1962
- 1964 (Leningrad): The Leningrad Fine Arts Exhibition
- 1965 (Leningrad): Spring Exhibition of works by Leningrad artists of 1965
- 1968 (Leningrad): A Fall Exhibition of works by Leningrad artists of 1968
- 1975 (Leningrad): Our Contemporary regional exhibition of Leningrad artists of 1975
- 1977 (Leningrad): Art belongs to the people. Anniversary Exhibition of Leningrad artists dedicated to 60th Anniversary of Great October Revolution of 1917
- 1978 (Leningrad): The Fall Exhibition of works by Leningrad artists of 1978
- 1980 (Leningrad): Regional Art exhibition of Leningrad artists of 1980
- 1994 (Saint Petersburg): Paintings of 1950-1980s by the Leningrad School artists
- 1994 (Saint Petersburg): Etude in creativity of the Leningrad School's artists
- 1995 (Saint Petersburg): Lyrical motifs in postwar Leningrad painting
- 2013 (Saint Petersburg): Paintings of 1940-1980 by the Artists of the Leningrad School, in ARKA Gallery

== Sources ==
- Центральный Государственный Архив литературы и искусства. СПб. Ф.78. Оп.8. Д.8.
- Выставка произведений ленинградских художников 1950 года. Каталог. М.-Л., Искусство, 1951. С.14.
- Выставка произведений ленинградских художников 1951 года. Каталог. Л., Лениздат, 1951. С.8.
- Весенняя выставка произведений ленинградских художников 1953 года. Каталог. Л., ЛССХ, 1953. С.5.
- Весенняя выставка произведений ленинградских художников 1955 года. Каталог. Л., ЛССХ, 1956. С.5.
- Осенняя выставка произведений ленинградских художников 1956 года. Каталог. Л., Ленинградский художник, 1958. С.6.
- 1917 — 1957. Выставка произведений ленинградских художников. Каталог. Л., Ленинградский художник, 1958. С.8.
- Всесоюзная художественная выставка, посвящённая 40-летию Великой Октябрьской социалистической революции. Каталог. М., Советский художник, 1957. С.10.
- Осенняя выставка произведений ленинградских художников 1958 года. Каталог. Л., Художник РСФСР, 1959. С.6.
- Выставка произведений ленинградских художников 1960 года. Каталог. Л., Художник РСФСР, 1963. С.7.
- Выставка произведений ленинградских художников 1960 года. Каталог. Л., Художник РСФСР, 1961. С.9.
- Республиканская художественная выставка «Советская Россия». Каталог. М., Советский художник, 1960. С.15.
- Выставка произведений ленинградских художников 1961 года. Каталог. Л., Художник РСФСР, 1964. С.9.
- Ленинград. Зональная выставка 1964 года. Каталог. Л, Художник РСФСР, 1965. C.9.
- Каталог весенней выставки произведений ленинградских художников 1965 года. Л., Художник РСФСР, 1970. С.8.
- Осенняя выставка произведений ленинградских художников 1968 года. Каталог. Л., Художник РСФСР, 1971. С.8.
- Каталог весенней выставки произведений ленинградских художников 1969 года. Л., Художник РСФСР, 1970. C.7.
- Наш современник. Зональная выставка произведений ленинградских художников 1975 года. Каталог. Л., Художник РСФСР, 1980. C.11.
- Exhibition of modern Soviet Painting. 1977. Gekkoso Gallery. Catalogue. Tokyo, 1977. P.20,43,87.
- Осенняя выставка произведений ленинградских художников. 1978 года. Каталог. Л., Художник РСФСР, 1983. С.5.
- Зональная выставка произведений ленинградских художников 1980 года. Каталог. Л., Художник РСФСР, 1983. C.9.
- L' École de Leningrad. Catalogue. Paris, Drouot Richelieu, 16 Juin, 1989. P.10–11.
- L' École de Leningrad. Catalogue. Paris, Drouot Richelieu, 27 Novembre, 1989. P.6.
- L' École de Leningrad. Auction Catalogue. Paris, Drouot Richelieu, 12 Mars 1990. P.34–35.
- L' École de Leningrad. Catalogue. Paris, Drouot Richelieu, June 11, 1990. P.28–29.
- L' École de Leningrad. Auction Catalogue. Paris, Drouot Richelieu, 21 Decembre 1990. P.20–21.
- Всеволод Баженов. Живопись. К 85-летию со дня рождения. Выставка произведений. Каталог. СПб., 1994.
- Ленинградские художники. Живопись 1950—1980 годов. Каталог. СПб., 1994. С.3.
- Этюд в творчестве ленинградских художников. Выставка произведений. Каталог. СПб., 1994. С.3.
- Soviet realist and impressionist paintings. London, Phillips, 1994.
- Лирика в произведениях художников военного поколения. Выставка произведений. Каталог. СПб., 1995. С.3.
- Связь времен. 1932—1997. Художники — члены Санкт-Петербургского Союза художников России. Каталог выставки. СПб., 1997. С.32.
- Matthew C. Bown. Dictionary of 20th Century Russian and Soviet Painters 1900–1980s. London, Izomar 1998. ISBN 0-9532061-0-6, ISBN 978-0-9532061-0-0.
- Sergei V. Ivanov. Unknown Socialist Realism. The Leningrad School. Saint Petersburg, NP-Print Edition, 2007. P.19, 24, 356, 388–393, 395, 396, 399, 400, 404–406, 446. ISBN 5-901724-21-6, ISBN 978-5-901724-21-7.
- Баженов В. А. В заливе Ха-Лонг // 80 лет Санкт-Петербургскому Союзу художников. Юбилейная выставка. СПб., «Цветпринт», 2012. С.203.
