= Maria Zubreeva =

Russian artist (1900–1991)

Maria Abramovna Zubreeva
- Born: 21 August 1900; Korukovka, Chernigov Governorate, Ukraine, Russian Empire
- Died: 8 October 1991 (aged 91); Saint Petersburg, USSR
- Education: Repin Institute of Arts
- Known for: Painting, Graphics
- Movement: Realism

Maria Abramovna (Avraamovna) Zubreeva (Russian: Мари́я Абра́мовна Зубре́ева; 21 August 1900 – 8 October 1991) was a Soviet realist painter, watercolorist, graphic artist, and designer, who lived and worked in Leningrad. She was regarded as one of the representatives of the Leningrad school of painting.

Zubreeva was born on 21 August 1900 in the village Korukovka of the Chernigov Governorate, located in the historical Left-bank Ukraine region of the Russian Empire.

In 1923, Zubreeva entered at the first course of the Leningrad Vkhutein (The Leningrad Higher Institute of Industrial Art, today the Saint Petersburg Art and Industry Academy, before 1918 known as the High Art School under Imperial Academy of Arts; since 1944 known as the Repin Institute of Arts), where she studied under Vladimir Konashevich and Dmitry Mitrokhin. In 1927 she graduated from the Leningrad Vkhutein. Her graduation work was to design the book A Week, by Yuri Libedinsky.

Starting in 1928 Zubreeva participated in art exhibitions. She painted landscapes, portraits, still lifes, genre scenes, worked in watercolors, tempera, and monumental painting. She was best known for her watercolor portraits of contemporaries. In 1932 Zubreeva was admitted to the Leningrad Union of Soviet Artists (since 1992 known as the Saint Petersburg Union of Artists).

In 1930-1950s Zubreeva together with husband artist Sergei Zakharov worked frequently in Tajikistan, where she designed the interiors of public buildings.

Personal exhibitions of works of Zubreeva were in Leningrad (1951, 1980, 1984), in Saint Petersburg (1996), and in Moscow (1961, 1965).

Maria Zubreeva died on 8 October 1991 in Saint Petersburg. Her paintings reside in the State Russian Museum, State Tretyakov Gallery, and in museums and private collections in Russia, Italy, France, England and other countries.

== Sources ==
- Artists of the USSR. Biography and Bibliography Dictionary. Volume 4, part 1. - Moscow: Iskusstvo, 1983. - p. 359.
- Directory of members of the Leningrad branch of Union of Artists of Russian Federation. - Leningrad: Khudozhnik RSFSR, 1987. - p. 49.
- Sergei V. Ivanov. Unknown Socialist Realism. The Leningrad School. - Saint Petersburg: NP-Print Edition, 2007. – pp. 9, 27, 144, 188, 361, 383, 385, 387–393, 402, 405, 413, 415, 416, 420, 422, 444. ISBN 5-901724-21-6, ISBN 978-5-901724-21-7.
- Anniversary Directory graduates of Saint Petersburg State Academic Institute of Painting, Sculpture, and Architecture named after Ilya Repin, Russian Academy of Arts. 1915 - 2005. - Saint Petersburg: Pervotsvet Publishing House, 2007.- p. 375. ISBN 978-5-903677-01-6.
