= Boris Lavrenko =

Russian realist painter

Boris Mikhailovich Lavrenko
- Born: 6 May 1920; Rostov-on-Don, Soviet Russia
- Died: 7 June 2001 (aged 81); Saint Petersburg, Russian Federation
- Education: Repin Institute of Arts
- Known for: Painting, Graphics, Art teaching
- Movement: Realism
- Awards: Honored Artist of the RSFSR, People's Artist of the Russian Federation

Boris Mikhailovich Lavrenko (Russian: Бори́с Миха́йлович Лавре́нко; 6 May 1920 – 7 June 2001) was a Russian Soviet realist painter, People's Artist of the Russian Federation, professor of the Leningrad Institute of Painting, Sculpture and Architecture named after Ilya Repin, who lived and worked in Saint Petersburg (former Leningrad), regarded as one of the major representatives of the Leningrad school of painting.

== Biography ==
Boris Mikhailovich Lavrenko was born on 6 May 1920 in the city of Rostov on Don, Soviet Russia.

In 1936–1940 years Boris Lavrenko studied at the Rostov on Don Art School. In Autumn of 1940, he was drafted into the Red Army. Boris Lavrenko was a veteran of World War II. As an artilleryman, he went all the way from Moscow to Berlin. His front-line drawings, sketches, portraits are interesting as a documentary and truth.

After demobilization in 1946, Boris Lavrenko entered at the first course of the Leningrad Institute of Painting, Sculpture and Architecture named after Ilya Repin. There he studied under Mikhail Avilov, Ivan Stepashkin, Genrikh Pavlovsky, Joseph Serebriany.

In 1952, Boris Lavrenko graduated from the Leningrad Institute of Painting, Sculpture and Architecture as artist of painting in Rudolf Frentz workshop, together with Sergei Babkov, Leonid Baykov, Irina Baldina, Dmitry Beliaev, Abram Grushko, Marina Kozlovskaya, Boris Korneev, Elena Kostenko, Oleg Lomakin, Piotr Fomin, Vladimir Chekalov, and other young artists. His graduated work was genre painting named "At the collective farm Stadium".

Since 1936, Boris Lavrenko has participated in Art Exhibitions. He painted portraits, genre and historical paintings, landscapes, still lifes, sketches from the life. It became the leading genre portrait of a contemporary. Boris Lavrenko’s works were exhibited in 1972 in Moscow, Leningrad, and Rostov on Don, to great acclaim. Later his art were exhibited in Leningrad in 1986 and in 1996.

Since 1953, Boris Lavrenko was a member of the Leningrad Union of Artists (since 1992, named as Saint Petersburg Union of Artists).

Over the 40 years, Boris Lavrenko combined her creative activities with pedagogical work. Since 1954 he taught in the Repin Institute of Arts. He was Doctor of art-criticism (1983), professor of painting, a head of personal workshop and graphical department of the Repin Institute of Arts.

In 1976 Boris Lavrenko was awarded the honorary title of Honored Artist of the RSFSR. In 1994 he was awarded the honorary title of People's Artist of the Russian Federation.

Boris Mikhailovich Lavrenko died on 7 June 2001 in Saint Petersburg at the eighty-first year of life. His paintings reside in State Russian Museum, State Tretyakov Gallery, in art museums and private collections in Russia, England, Germany, France, Italy, the U.S., and others.

== See also ==
- Leningrad School of Painting
- List of Russian artists
- List of 20th-century Russian painters
- List of painters of Saint Petersburg Union of Artists
- Saint Petersburg Union of Artists

== Bibliography ==
- The Spring Exhibition of works by Leningrad artists of 1954. Exhibition Catalogue. - Leningrad: Izogiz Edition, 1954. - p. 12.
- 1917 - 1957. Exhibition of works by Leningrad artists of 1957. Exhibition Catalogue. - Leningrad: Khudozhnik RSFSR, 1958. - p. 20.
- All-Union Art Exhibition of 1957 dedicated to the 40th Anniversary of October Revolution. Catalogue. - Moscow: Soviet artist, 1957. - p. 42.
- Autumn Exhibition of works by Leningrad artists of 1958. Exhibition Catalogue. - Leningrad: Khudozhnik RSFSR, 1959. - p. 16.
- All-Union Art Exhibition dedicated to 40th Anniversary of Komsomol. Catalogue. - Moscow: Ministry of Culture of USSR, 1958.
- Exhibition of works by Leningrad artists of 1960. Exhibition catalogue. - Leningrad: Khudozhnik RSFSR, 1961. - p. 24.
- Soviet Russia republic exhibition of 1960. Exhibition catalogue. - Moscow: Ministry of culture of Russian Federation, 1960. - p. 47.
- Exhibition of works by Leningrad artists of 1961. Exhibition catalogue. - Leningrad: Khudozhnik RSFSR, 1964. - p. 24.
- Autumn Exhibition of works by Leningrad artists of 1962. Exhibition Catalogue. - Leningrad: : Khudozhnik RSFSR, 1962. - p. 16.
- The Leningrad Fine Arts Exhibition. - Leningrad: Khudozhnik RSFSR, 1965. - p. 29.
- Soviet Russia the Third Republic Exhibition of 1967. Catalogue. - Moscow: Ministry of culture of Russian Federation, 1967. - p. 34.
- The Spring Exhibition of works by Leningrad artists of 1969. Catalogue. - Leningrad: Khudozhnik RSFSR, 1970. - p. 12.
- Exhibition of works by Leningrad artists dedicated to the 25th Anniversary of the Victory in Great Patriotic war. Catalogue. - Leningrad: Khudozhnik RSFSR, 1972. - p. 7.
- Our Contemporary Exhibition catalogue of works by Leningrad artists of 1971. - Leningrad: Khudozhnik RSFSR, 1972. - p. 14.
- Our Contemporary The Second Exhibition of works by Leningrad artists of 1972. Catalogue. - Leningrad: Khudozhnik RSFSR, 1973. - p. 8.
- Art works by Russian Federation Artists grants to Museums and Culture Institutions (1963–1971). Official Catalogue. - Moscow: Russian Federation Union of Artists, 1972. - p. 57.
- Our Contemporary The Third Exhibition of works by Leningrad artists of 1973. Catalogue. - Leningrad: Khudozhnik RSFSR, 1974. - p. 9.
- The Still-Life Exhibition of works by Leningrad artists. Exhibition catalogue. - Leningrad: Khudozhnik RSFSR, 1973. - p. 9.
- Exhibitions of Soviet art. Directory. Volume 3. 1941 - 1947. - Moscow: Soviet Artist, 1973. - pp. 291, 366.
- Our Contemporary regional exhibition of Leningrad artists of 1975. Catalogue. - Leningrad: Khudozhnik RSFSR, 1980. - p. 18.
- The Portrait of Contemporary the Fifth Exhibition of works by Leningrad artists of 1976. Catalogue. - Leningrad: Khudozhnik RSFSR, 1983. - p. 13.
- The Fine Arts of Leningrad. Exhibition catalogue. - Leningrad: Khudozhnik RSFSR, 1976. - p. 21.
- Exhibition of works by Leningrad artists dedicated to the 60th Anniversary of October Revolution. Catalogue. - Leningrad: Khudozhnik RSFSR, 1982. - p. 16.
- Directory of members of the Union of Artists of USSR. Volume 1. - Moscow: Soviet artist, 1979. - p. 605.
- Regional Exhibition of works by Leningrad artists of 1980. Exhibition catalogue. - Leningrad: Khudozhnik RSFSR, 1983. - p. 16.
- Exhibitions of Soviet art. Directory. Volume 5. 1954 - 1958. - Moscow: Soviet Artist, 1981. - pp. 25, 27, 120, 162, 230, 271, 375, 386, 490, 533, 548, 638.
- Exhibition of works by Leningrad artists dedicated to the 40th Anniversary of the complete liberation of Leningrad from the enemy blockade. - Leningrad: Khudozhnik RSFSR, 1989. - p. 11.
- Lavrenko Boris. Exhibition of works of Art. Catalogue. - Leningrad: Khudozhnik RSFSR, 1986.
- Directory of members of the Leningrad branch of Union of Artists of Russian Federation. - Leningrad: Khudozhnik RSFSR, 1987. - p. 71.
- Exhibition of works by Leningrad artists-veterans of Great Patriotic war. - Leningrad: Khudozhnik RSFSR, 1990. - p. 11.
- L' École de Leningrad. Auction Catalogue. - Paris: Drouot Richelieu, 12 Mars 1990. - pp. 14–15.
- L' École de Leningrad. Auction Catalogue. - Paris: Drouot Richelieu, 12 Novembre 1991. - pp. 14–15.
- Charmes Russes. Auction Catalogue. - Paris: Drouot Richelieu, 15 Mai 1991. - pp. 46–47.
- Charmes Russes. Auction Catalogue. - Paris: Drouot Richelieu, 9 Decembre 1991. - pp. 14–15.
- Swanson, Vern G. Hidden Treasures: Russian and Soviet Impressionism 1930-1970s. Scotsdale: Fleischer Museum, 1994.
- Painting from the life, by Leningrad artists. Exhibition catalogue. - Saint Petersburg: Nikolai Nekrasov Memorial museum, 1994. - p. 4.
- Saint-Pétersbourg - Pont-Audemer. Dessins, Gravures, Sculptures et Tableaux du XX siècle du fonds de L' Union des Artistes de Saint-Pétersbourg. - Pont-Audemer: 1994. - pp. 90, 108.
- The Lyrics in the works of artists of the war generation. Painting, drawings. Exhibition catalogue. - Saint Petersburg: Nikolai Nekrasov Memorial museum, 1995. - p. 4.
- Matthew C. Bown. Dictionary of 20th Century Russian and Soviet Painters 1900-1980s. - London: Izomar, 1998. ISBN 0-9532061-0-6, ISBN 978-0-9532061-0-0.
- Link of Times: 1932 - 1997. Artists - Members of Saint - Petersburg Union of Artists of Russia. Exhibition catalogue. - Saint Petersburg: Manezh Central Exhibition Hall, 1997. - p. 291.
- Sergei V. Ivanov. Unknown Socialist Realism. The Leningrad School. - Saint Petersburg: NP-Print Edition, 2007. – pp. 9, 18, 20, 27, 29, 126, 193, 339, 363, 370, 389, 390, 392-402, 404-407, 414-424, 445. ISBN 5-901724-21-6, ISBN 978-5-901724-21-7.
- Anniversary Directory graduates of Saint Petersburg State Academic Institute of Painting, Sculpture, and Architecture named after Ilya Repin, Russian Academy of Arts. 1915 - 2005. - Saint Petersburg: Pervotsvet Publishing House, 2007. p. 70. ISBN 978-5-903677-01-6.
