= Oleg Lomakin =

Russian painter

Oleg Leonidovich Lomakin
- Born: 29 August 1924; Krasny Kholm, Tver Province, USSR.
- Died: 25 March 2010 (aged 85); Saint Petersburg, Russia
- Education: Repin Institute of Arts
- Known for: Painting, Graphics
- Movement: Realism
- Awards: Honored Artist of the RSFSR

Oleg Leonidovich Lomakin (Russian: Оле́г Леони́дович Лома́кин; 29 August 1924 – 25 March 2010) was a Russian Soviet realist painter, Honored Artist of the RSFSR, who lived and worked in Saint Petersburg (former Leningrad). He was regarded as one of the major representatives of the Leningrad school of painting.

== Biography ==
Oleg Leonidovich Lomakin was born on 29 August 1924 in the town of Krasny Kholm, Tver Province, USSR. In the 1930s after the death of his father the family moved first to Bezhetsk, then to Leningrad.

In 1937-1939 Oleg Lomakin studied in Art studio at the Leningrad Palace of Young Pioneers. In 1940 he entered the Leningrad Secondary Art School at the All-Russian Academy of Fine Arts. In February 1942, together with the Secondary Art School, he was evacuated from besieged Leningrad to Samarkand, Central Asia.

In June 1942, Oleg Lomakin was drafted into the Red Army and took part in the German-Soviet War. As anti-aircraft gunner he participated in the Battle of Kursk, was wounded and marked by military awards. After demobilization Lomakin returned to studies and graduated from the Secondary Art School in 1946.

In the same year Oleg Lomakin was adopted at the first course of the Department of Painting of the Repin Institute of Arts, there he studied of Boris Ioganson, Alexander Zaytsev, Mikhail Bernshtein, Piotr Ivanovsky, Vladislav Anisovich, Sergei Mikhailov.

In 1952, Oleg Lomakin graduated from the Repin Institute of Arts in Boris Ioganson workshop, together with Sergei Babkov, Leonid Baykov, Irina Baldina, Dmitry Beliaev, Abram Grushko, Marina Kozlovskaya, Boris Korneev, Elena Kostenko, Boris Lavrenko, Piotr Fomin, Vladimir Chekalov, and other young artists. His graduated work was historical painting named "Mikhail Kalinin among their fellow villagers".

Since 1952, Lomakin has participated in Art Exhibitions. He painted portraits, genre and historical paintings, landscapes, still lifes, sketches from the life. A Portrait of a contemporary had become a leading genre in his creativity.

Oleg Lomakin's style distinguish a broad painting, energetic brushstroke, artistic transfer of tonal relations and states of lighting and air. He was acknowledged master of drawing and plein air painting.

In 1952 Oleg Lomakin was admitted as a member of the Leningrad Union of Artists (since 1992, named as Saint Petersburg Union of Artists). In 1981 Lomakin was awarded the honorary title of Honored Artist of the Russian Federation.

Oleg Leonidovich Lomakin died on 25 March 2010 in Saint Petersburg in his eighty-sixth year of life. His paintings reside in State Russian Museum, State Tretyakov Gallery, in art museums and private collections in Russia, France, England, Germany, Italy, in the U.S., and others.

== See also ==
- Leningrad School of Painting
- List of Russian artists
- List of 20th century Russian painters
- List of painters of Saint Petersburg Union of Artists
- Saint Petersburg Union of Artists

== Bibliography ==
- Charmes Russes. Auction Catalogue. — Paris: Drouot Richelieu, 15 Mai 1991. — р.8-12.
- L' École de Leningrad. Catalogue. - Paris: Drouot Richelieu, 11 Juin 1990. - p. 142-143.
- L' École de Leningrad. Catalogue. - Paris: Drouot Richelieu, 21 Decembre 1990. - p. 48-51.
- Peinture Russe. Catalogue. - Paris: Drouot Richelieu, 18 Fevrier, 1991. - p. 7,66-67.
- Moiseeva N. Oleg Leonidovich Lomakin. - Leningrad: Khudozhnik RSFSR, 1991. - 96 p.
- L' École de Leningrad. Catalogue. — Paris: Drouot Richelieu, 25 Novembre 1991. — р.80-81.
- Les Saisons Russes. Catalogue. — Paris: Drouot Richelieu, 29 Novembre 1993. — р.22-23.
- Matthew C. Bown. Dictionary of 20th Century Russian and Soviet Painters 1900-1980s. - London: Izomar, 1998. ISBN 0-9532061-0-6, ISBN 978-0-9532061-0-0.
- Vern G. Swanson. Soviet Impressionism. - Woodbridge, England: Antique Collectors' Club, 2001. - pp. 152, 158, 202, 203. ISBN 1-85149-280-1, ISBN 978-1-85149-280-0.
- Sergei V. Ivanov. Unknown Socialist Realism. The Leningrad School. - Saint Petersburg: NP-Print Edition, 2007. – pp. 9, 15, 18, 20, 24, 27, 29, 31, 42, 90, 364, 389-401, 403-406, 414-424, 439. ISBN 5-901724-21-6, ISBN 978-5-901724-21-7.
- Artists of Peter's Academy of Arts and Sciences. - Saint Petersburg: Ladoga Edition, 2008. - p. 108–109.
- Иванов С. Инвестиции в советскую живопись: ленинградская школа // Петербургские искусствоведческие тетради. Вып. 31. СПб, 2014. С.54-60.
