= Piotr Vasiliev =

Russian painter

Piotr Konstantinovich Vasiliev
- Born: 26 January 1909; Saint Petersburg, Russian Empire
- Died: 9 June 1989 (aged 80); Leningrad, USSR
- Education: Repin Institute of Arts
- Known for: Painting
- Movement: Realism

Piotr Konstantinovich Vasiliev (Russian: Пё́тр Константи́нович Васи́льев; 26 January 1909 – 9 June 1989) was a Russian Soviet realist painter, who lived and worked in Leningrad. He was a member of the Leningrad Union of Artists and regarded as one of representatives of the Leningrad school of painting.

== Biography ==
Piotr Konstantinovich Vasiliev was born on 26 January 1909 in Saint Petersburg, Russian Empire in the working-class family.

In 1930, Piotr Vasiliev entered at the first course of Department of Painting at the Leningrad Institute of Painting, Sculpture and Architecture, where he studied of noted educators Mikhail Bernshtein, Alexander Lubimov, Vladimir Serov, Arcady Rylov.

In 1938 Piotr Vasiliev graduated from the Leningrad Institute of Painting, Sculpture and Architecture in Isaak Brodsky studio, together with Alexander Laktionov, Yuri Neprintsev, and other young artists. His graduated work was historical painting named "Farewell member of the Komsomol at the front. 1919.", dedicated to the events of the Civil War in Russia in 1918–1921.

After graduation, Piotr Vasiliev was sent to work for an art teacher in Chuvashia. After returning to Leningrad in the years 1939-1941 he taught painting in the Tavricheskaya Art School.

In June 1941, Piotr Vasiliev was drafted into the Red Army and took part in the Great Patriotic War of the Soviet people against Nazi Germany and its allies. He fought on the Leningrad Front, Karelian Front, and 3rd Ukrainian Front. He was wounded and marked by military awards.

In 1944–1945, Piotr Vasiliev took part in the liberation of the Nazi occupation of Poland, Romania, Hungary, Czechoslovakia, and Austria.

Piotr Vasiliev has participated in art exhibitions since 1938. He painted portraits, landscapes, still lifes, genre and historical paintings. In 1946 Piotr Vasiliev was admitted to the Leningrad Union of Soviet Artists (since 1992 known as the Saint Petersburg Union of Artists).

His picturesque style is typical for students of Isaac Brodsky, and based on the constructive role of drawing, on classically constructed composition and delicate tonal relations, on transfer of lighting and shadow contrasts. The artist used mainly broad painting and a rich palette of colors.

Piotr Konstantinovich Vasiliev died on 9 June 1989 in Leningrad in the eighty-first year of his life. His paintings reside in art museums and private collections in Russia, England, in the U.S., Japan, France, and others.

== Honours and awards ==
- Order of the Red Star
- Medal "For the Defence of Leningrad"
- Medal "For the Victory over Germany in the Great Patriotic War 1941–1945"
- Medal "For the Capture of Budapest"
- Medal "For the Capture of Vienna"

== See also ==
- Leningrad School of Painting
- List of Russian artists
- List of 20th-century Russian painters
- List of painters of Saint Petersburg Union of Artists
- Saint Petersburg Union of Artists

== Sources ==
- Artists of the peoples of the USSR. Biography Dictionary. Volume 2. - Moscow: Iskusstvo Edition, 1972. - p. 190.
- Peinture Russe. Catalogue. - Paris: Drouot Richelieu, 26 Avril, 1991. - p. 7,25.
- Sergei V. Ivanov. Unknown Socialist Realism. The Leningrad School. - Saint Petersburg: NP-Print Edition, 2007. – pp. 15, 18, 28, 29, 78, 79, 358, 384, 390, 394, 396, 402, 404, 405, 411, 414, 416, 421, 422. ISBN 5-901724-21-6, ISBN 978-5-901724-21-7.
- Anniversary Directory graduates of Saint Petersburg State Academic Institute of Painting, Sculpture, and Architecture named after Ilya Repin, Russian Academy of Arts. 1915 - 2005. - Saint Petersburg: Pervotsvet Publishing House, 2007. p. 62.
