= Yuri Shablikin =

Russian painter

Yuri Mikhailovich Shablikin
- Born: October 31, 1932 (age 93); Leningrad, USSR
- Education: Vera Mukhina Institute
- Known for: Painting, Graphics, Restoration
- Movement: Realism

Yuri Mikhailovich Shablikin (Russian: Ю́рий Миха́йлович Шаблы́кин; October 31, 1932, Leningrad, USSR) was a Soviet, Russian realist painter, graphic artist, restorer, art teacher, who live and work in Saint Petersburg, a member of the Saint Petersburg Union of Artists (before 1992 - the Leningrad branch of Union of Artists of Russian Federation), regarded by art historian Sergei V. Ivanov as one of representatives of the Leningrad school of painting.

== Biography ==
Shablikin was born October 31, 1932, in the Leningrad, USSR.

In 1955 Shablikin graduated from the Leningrad Higher School of Industrial Art named after Vera Mukhina where he studied under Vasily Ushakov, Gleb Savinov, Ivan Stepashkin, Lija Ostrova, Alexander Kazantsev.

Since 1956 Shablikin has participated in art exhibitions. He painted landscapes, still lifes, portraits, genre scenes, worked in monumental painting and as restorer of painting. He exhibited his works in Leningrad in 1976, and in Nyandoma (Arkhangelsk Province) in 1986.

Shablikin most famous for his lyrical landscapes devoted to nature and the life of the northern Russian countryside. For example, he made a lot of paintings about Shozhma River and Shozhma village. He paint his works mostly from the memory, creating the artistic equivalent of his deeply personal perception of nature. At the Russian North he has found not only his own motives, but also a special silver range of colours, which are characteristic of these places and become the feature of his paintings.

Shablikin is a member of the Saint Petersburg Union of Artists since 1960. In the years 1950-1960, he taught at the Department of General Painting at the Leningrad Higher School of Industrial Art named after Vera Mukhina.

His paintings reside in museums and private collections in Russia, Germany, France, England, the U.S., Italy, and others.

== See also ==
- Leningrad School of Painting
- List of painters of Saint Petersburg Union of Artists
- Saint Petersburg Union of Artists

== Bibliography ==
- Sergei V. Ivanov. Unknown Socialist Realism. The Leningrad School. - Saint Petersburg: NP-Print Edition, 2007. – pp. 19, 100, 373, 390, 393, 394, 396, 398, 399, 401, 404, 406, 415-420, 422-424, 443. ISBN 5-901724-21-6, ISBN 978-5-901724-21-7.
