= Galina Rumiantseva =

Russian artist (1927–2004)

- Галина Румянцева
- Born: 23 June 1927; Sestroretsk, Leningrad Oblast, Russian SFSR, Soviet Union
- Died: 17 September 2004 (aged 77); Saint Petersburg, Russia
- Education: Repin Institute of Arts
- Known for: Painting, Graphics
- Movement: Realism

Galina Alexeevna Rumiantseva (Russian: Галина Алексеевна Румянцева; 23 June 1927 – 17 September 2004) was a Russian Soviet realist painter and graphic artist, who lived and worked in Saint Petersburg (formerly Leningrad). She was regarded as one of representatives of the Leningrad school of painting.

== Biography ==
Galina Alexeevna Rumiantseva was born on 23 June 1927 in Sestroretsk, Leningrad Oblast, Russian SFSR, Soviet Union. In 1945, she entered the Tavricheskaya Art School, from which she graduated in 1950. Her graduation work were historical paintings "Mikhail Lomonosov at the meeting of the Academic Council", and "Mikhail Lomonosov in the chemical laboratory."

In 1951, Rumiantseva entered the Leningrad Institute of Painting, Sculpture and Architecture named after Ilya Repin. There she studied under noted art educators Alexander Zaytsev, Vasily Sokolov, and Leonid Khudiakov.

In 1957, Rumiantseva graduated from the Leningrad Institute of Painting, Sculpture and Architecture as an artist of painting in Boris Ioganson workshop, together with Ilya Glazunov, Elena Gorokhova, Vladimir Malevsky, Zlata Bizova, Ivan Varichev, Dmitry Oboznenko, and other young artists. Her graduated work was genre painting named "From the Club".

Since 1957, Galina Rumiantseva had participated in Art Exhibitions. She painted portraits, genre scenes, landscapes, still lifes, sketches from the life. The leading theme of her work were children's images. Her style evolved from a strict objectivism and academicism in direction of more impressions and plein air painting.

Galina Rumiantseva was a member of the Leningrad Union of Artists (after 1992 named as Saint Petersburg Union of Artists) since 1958.

Galina Alexeevna Rumiantseva died in Saint Petersburg in 2004. Her paintings reside in museums and private collections in Russia, England, Germany, France, Italy, in the U.S., and other countries.

== See also ==
- Leningrad School of Painting
- List of Russian artists
- List of 20th-century Russian painters
- List of painters of Saint Petersburg Union of Artists
- List of the Russian Landscape painters
- Saint Petersburg Union of Artists

== Bibliography ==
- 1917–1957. Выставка произведений ленинградских художников. Каталог. Л., Ленинградский художник, 1958. С.7.
- Осенняя выставка произведений ленинградских художников 1958 года. Каталог. Л., Художник РСФСР, 1959. С.6.
- Выставка произведений ленинградских художников 1960 года. Каталог. Л., Художник РСФСР, 1961. С.7.
- Республиканская художественная выставка «Советская Россия». Каталог. М., Советский художник, 1960. С.12.
- Выставка произведений ленинградских художников 1961 года. Каталог. Л., Художник РСФСР, 1964. С.8.
- Осенняя выставка произведений ленинградских художников 1962 года. Каталог. Л., Художник РСФСР, 1962. С.7.
- Ленинград. Зональная выставка. Л., Художник РСФСР, 1965. С.46.
- Каталог произведений художников Российской Федерации, переданных в дар организациям и учреждениям культуры (1963–1971 гг.). М., СХ РСФСР, 1972. С.10, 92.
- Наш современник. Третья выставка произведений ленинградских художников 1973 года. Каталог. Л., Художник РСФСР, 1974. С.11.
- Весенняя выставка произведений ленинградских художников. Каталог. — Л.: Художник РСФСР, 1974. — С. 10.
- Наш современник. Зональная выставка произведений ленинградских художников 1975 года. Каталог. Л., Художник РСФСР, 1980. С.23.
- Справочник членов Союза художников СССР. Том 2. — М.: Советский художник, 1979. — С. 289.
- Справочник членов Ленинградской организации Союза художников РСФСР / Сост.: М. О. Клюшкина. — Л.: Художник РСФСР, 1987. — 154 с. — С. 112.
- Зональная выставка произведений ленинградских художников 1980 года. Каталог. Л., Художник РСФСР, 1983. С.22.
- Выставки советского изобразительного искусства. Справочник. Том 5. 1954–1958 годы. — М.: Советский художник, 1981. — С. 385, 466, 548.
- Charmes Russes. Catalogue. — Paris: Drouot Richelieu, 15 Mai 1991. — p. 78.
- ECOLE DE SAINT-PETERSBOURG : catalogue / ARCOLE / Etude Gros-Delettrez. — Paris: Drouot Richelieu, 27 Janvier, 1992.
- ECOLE DE SAINT-PETERSBOURG : catalogue / ARCOLE / Etude Gros-Delettrez. — Paris: Drouot Richelieu, 13 Mars, 1992.
- Ленинградские художники. Живопись 1950–1980 годов. Каталог. СПб., 1994. С.6.
- Этюд в творчестве ленинградских художников. Выставка произведений. Каталог. СПб., Мемориальный музей Н. А. Некрасова, 1994. С.6.
- Лирика в произведениях художников военного поколения. Выставка произведений. Каталог. СПб., Мемориальный музей Н. А. Некрасова, 1995. С.6.
- Живопись 1940–1990 годов. Ленинградская школа. Выставка произведений. СПб., Мемориальный музей Н. А. Некрасова, 1996. С.4.
- Связь времён. 1932–1997. Художники — члены Санкт-Петербургского Союза художников России. Каталог выставки. — Санкт-Петербург: ЦВЗ «Манеж», 1997. — С. 297.
- Sergei V. Ivanov. Unknown Socialist Realism. The Leningrad School. – Saint Petersburg: NP-Print Edition, 2007. P.237, 368, 391, 393, 394, 398, 401, 404, 405, 415–418, 420, 422, 423. ISBN 5-901724-21-6, ISBN 978-5-901724-21-7.
- Anniversary Directory graduates of Saint Petersburg State Academic Institute of Painting, Sculpture, and Architecture named after Ilya Repin, Russian Academy of Arts. 1915–2005. - Saint Petersburg: Pervotsvet Publishing House, 2007. P.77.
