= Maya Kopitseva =

Russian artist

- Born: Maya Kuzminichna Kopitseva; 18 May 1924; Gagry, Abkhazia, USSR
- Died: 6 June 2005 (aged 81); Saint Petersburg, Russia
- Education: Repin Institute of Arts
- Known for: Painting
- Movement: Realism
- Awards: Honored Artist of the RSFSR

Maya Kuzminichna Kopitseva (Russian: Ма́йя Кузьми́нична Копы́тцева; 18 May 1924 – 6 June 2005) was a Soviet Russian still-life painter and an Honored Artist of the RSFSR who lived and worked in Leningrad - Saint Petersburg. She was a member of the Saint Petersburg Union of Artists, which before 1992 was the Leningrad branch of Union of Artists of the Russian Federation, and was regarded as one of the major representatives of the Leningrad school of painting.

== Biography ==
Maya Kuzminichna Kopitseva was born on 18 May 1924 in Gagry, Abkhazia, USSR. In 1951 she graduated from the Ilya Repin Institute in Boris Ioganson's workshop and among her teachers were Boris Fogel, Leonid Ovsiannikov and Alexander Zaytsev. Since 1951 Maya Kopitseva has participated in several art exhibitions, displaying still lifes, portraits, genre scenes and sketches done from life.

In 1951 Kopitseva became a member of the Saint Petersburg Union of Artists and in 2001 was awarded the honorary title of Honored Artist of the Russian Federation. She was a wife of well-known Russian painter and art educator Anatoli Levitin, a People's Artist of the USSR.

Kopitseva died of thyroid cancer in Saint Petersburg in 2005. Paintings by her reside in the Russian Museum, in public art museums and private collections in Russia, Italy, the U.S.A, Japan, China, France and elsewhere.

== See also ==
- List of 20th-century Russian painters
- List of painters of Saint Petersburg Union of Artists
- List of Russian artists

== Bibliography ==
- L' École de Leningrad. Auction Catalogue. Paris, Drouot Richelieu, 11 Juin 1990. P.132-133.
- Charmes Russes. Catalogue. Paris, Drouot Richelieu, 15 Mai 1991. P.73.
- Saint-Pétersbourg — Pont-Audemer. Dessins, Gravures, Sculptures et Tableaux du XX siècle du fonds de L' Union des Artistes de Saint-Pétersbourg. Pont-Audemer, 1994. P.89,93,108.
- Matthew C. Bown. Dictionary of 20th Century Russian and Soviet Painters 1900-1980s. - London: Izomar, 1998. ISBN 0-9532061-0-6, ISBN 978-0-9532061-0-0.
- Sergei V. Ivanov. Unknown Socialist Realism. The Leningrad School.- Saint Petersburg: NP-Print Edition, 2007. – pp. 9, 15, 20, 21, 24, 362, 388-397, 399-401, 404-407. ISBN 5-901724-21-6, ISBN 978-5-901724-21-7.
- Академическая дача. Каталог выставки. СПб., Санкт-Петербургский Союз художников, 2009. — с.2,4,13.
- Левитин А. П. Майя Копытцева. Художник. Личность. Друг. СПб., Левша, 2010. ISBN 978-5-93356-094-4.
- Иванов С. Тихая жизнь за ленинградским столом // Петербургские искусствоведческие тетради. Выпуск 23. СПб., 2012. С.90-97.
- Логвинова Е. Круглый стол по ленинградскому искусству в галерее АРКА // Петербургские искусствоведческие тетради. Вып. 31. СПб, 2014. С.17-26.
