= Yuri Tulin =

Russian painter

Yuri Nilovich Tulin
- Born: 14 August 1921; Maksatikha, Tver Province, Soviet Russia
- Died: 27 April 1988 (aged 66); Leningrad, USSR
- Education: Repin Institute of Arts
- Known for: Painting
- Movement: Realism
- Awards: Honored Artist of the Russian Federation

Yuri Nilovich Tulin (Russian: Ю́рий Ни́лович Ту́лин; 14 August 1921 – 27 April 1988) was a Soviet Russian painter and Honored Artist of the Russian Federation. He lived and worked in Leningrad and is regarded as one of the brightest representatives of the Leningrad school of painting, most famous for his portraits and historical paintings.

== Biography ==
Yuri Nilovich Tulin was born on 14 August 1921 in the village of Maksatikha, Tver Oblast, Soviet Russia.

In 1922, Tulin family moved to Petrograd. In the years 1930–1936 Yuri Tulin visited private Art studio of Alfred Eberling and Pavel Mikhailov, then Art studio at the Leningrad Palace of Young Pioneers. In 1937–1941 he studied at the Secondary Art School at the All-Russian Academy of Fine Arts, pupil of Piotr Kazakov and Alexander Zaitsev.

In 1941, Yuri Tulin entered the painting department of the Leningrad Institute of Painting, Sculpture and Architecture. After beginning of Great Patriotic War Yuri Tulin remained in Leningrad, he worked at the plant.

In 1944, after the liberation of Leningrad from the enemy's blockade and the return from evacuation institute Yuri Tulin resume classes at the faculty of painting. He studied of Mikhail Bernshtein, Genrikh Pavlovsky, Alexander Zaytsev.

In 1950, Yuri Tulin graduated from Leningrad Institute of Painting, Sculpture and Architecture named after Ilya Repin in Boris Ioganson personal Art Studio. His graduation work was a historical painting named "Sergei Kirov in Khibin Mountains", dedicated to industrial development of the Kola Peninsula.

Since 1948, Yuri Tulin has participated in Art Exhibitions. Painted portraits, genre and historical compositions, landscapes, worked in oil painting and drawing. His solo exhibitions were in Leningrad ( 1972, 1986, 1987), Moscow (1972), and Saint Petersburg (2001).

Widely known Yuri Tulin received for the painting "The Lena River. The Year of 1912." (1957, State Russian Museum), award-winning Grand Prix at the International Art Exhibition in Brussels in 1958.

In 1951, Yuri Tulin was admitted to the Leningrad Union of Soviet Artists (since 1992 known as the Saint Petersburg Union of Artists). In 1961 he was awarded the honorary title of Honored Artist of Russian Federation. In 1965 Tulin was awarded the honorary title of Honored Art worker of the Russian Federation.

Yuri Nilovich Tulin died on 27 April 1983 in Leningrad. His paintings reside in State Russian Museum, State Tretyakov Gallery, in the lot of Art museums and private collections in Russia, China, England, in the U.S., Japan, France, and throughout the world.

== See also ==
- Leningrad School of Painting
- List of Russian artists
- List of 20th-century Russian painters
- List of painters of Saint Petersburg Union of Artists
- Saint Petersburg Union of Artists

== Sources ==
- Saint-Pétersbourg — Pont-Audemer. Dessins, Gravures, Sculptures et Tableaux du XX siècle du fonds de L' Union des Artistes de Saint-Pétersbourg. — Pont-Audemer: 1994. — p. 51.
- Matthew C. Bown. Dictionary of 20th Century Russian and Soviet Painters 1900-1980s. - London: Izomar, 1998. ISBN 0-9532061-0-6, ISBN 978-0-9532061-0-0.
- Sergei V. Ivanov. Unknown Socialist Realism. The Leningrad School. - Saint Petersburg: NP-Print Edition, 2007. – pp. 9, 15, 20, 371, 388-400, 404, 406, 439, 442. ISBN 5-901724-21-6, ISBN 978-5-901724-21-7.
