= Abram Grushko =

Soviet painter

- Абрам Грушко
- Born: 6 June 1918; Moscow, Soviet Union
- Died: 15 March 1980 (aged 61); Leningrad, Soviet Union
- Education: Repin Institute of Arts
- Known for: Painting; art teaching
- Movement: Realism

Abram Borisovich Grushko (Russian: Абрам Борисович Грушко; 6 June 1918 – 15 March 1980) was a Soviet painter and art teacher that lived and worked in Leningrad. He was a member of the Leningrad branch of Union of Artists of Russian Federation and was one of the representatives of the Leningrad school of painting. He was most famous for his many landscape paintings.

== Biography ==
Abram Borisovich Grushko was born June 6, 1918, in Moscow, Soviet Russia. In 1952, Grushko graduated from the Ilya Repin Institute in the Boris Ioganson workshop. He studied the works of Boris Fogel, Semion Abugov, Lia Ostrova, Genrikh Pavlovsky, and Joseph Serebriany. After 1956, Grushko participated in Art Exhibitions and painted portraits, landscapes, and genre compositions. His works were featured in his solo exhibitions at Leningrad in 1990.

The main subjects of Abram Grushko's artwork were nature and the people of Zaonezhye (Lake Onega region in Karelia). His traditional plain air paintings in 1960 were replaced by decorative graphics solutions, similar to "severe style" with clarity of the silhouette, saturated colors, or a generalized drawing. Coloring was restrained, with a predominance of dark-brown, ocher, and blue tones.

Since 1961, Abram Grushko was a member of the Leningrad branch of Union of Artists of Russian Federation. In the years of 1965 – 1980, Abram Grushko worked as an Art Teacher at Vera Mukhina Institute of Art and Design. Abram Borisovich Grushko died on 15 March 1980, in Leningrad at the age of 61. His paintings reside in Art museums and private collections in Russia, Israel, Germany, the USA, England, Japan, France, and other countries around the world.

== See also ==
- Leningrad School of Painting
- List of Russian artists
- List of 20th-century Russian painters
- List of painters of Saint Petersburg Union of Artists
- List of the Russian Landscape painters
- Saint Petersburg Union of Artists

== Bibliography ==
- The Leningrad Fine Arts Exhibition. – Leningrad: Khudozhnik RSFSR, 1965. – p. 17.
- Directory of members of the Leningrad branch of Union of Artists of Russian Federation. – Leningrad: Khudozhnik RSFSR, 1972. - p. 15.
- L' École de Leningrad. Catalogue. – Paris: Drouot Richelieu, 12 Mars 1990. – p. 22-23.
- L' École de Leningrad. Catalogue. – Paris: Drouot Richelieu, 11 Juin 1990. – p. 44-45.
- Peinture Russe. Catalogue. – Paris: Drouot Richelieu, 18 Fevrier, 1991. – p. 7,47–48.
- Saint-Pétersbourg – Pont-Audemer. Dessins, Gravures, Sculptures et Tableaux du XX siècle du fonds de L' Union des Artistes de Saint-Pétersbourg. – Pont-Audemer: 1994. – p. 101.
- Matthew C. Bown. Dictionary of 20th Century Russian and Soviet Painters 1900-1980s. – London: Izomar 1998. ISBN 0-9532061-0-6, ISBN 978-0-9532061-0-0.
- Sergei V. Ivanov. Unknown Socialist Realism. The Leningrad School. – Saint Petersburg: NP-Print Edition, 2007. – p. 15, 360, 389, 390, 392–394, 396, 399, 400, 403–406, 445. ISBN 5-901724-21-6, ISBN 978-5-901724-21-7.
- Anniversary Directory graduates of Saint Petersburg State Academic Institute of Painting, Sculpture, and Architecture named after Ilya Repin, Russian Academy of Arts. 1915–2005. - Saint Petersburg: Pervotsvet Publishing House, 2007.- p. 67. ISBN 978-5-903677-01-6.
