= Marina Kozlovskaya =

Soviet and Russian painter (1925–2019)

Marina Andreevna Kozlovskaya
- Born: 7 April 1925; Leningrad, USSR
- Died: 2019 (aged 93–94); Saint Petersburg, Russia
- Education: Repin Institute of Arts
- Known for: Painting
- Movement: Realism

Marina Andreevna Kozlovskaya (Russian: Мари́на Андре́евна Козло́вская; 7 April 1925 – 2019) was a Soviet and Russian painter who lived and worked in Leningrad – Saint Petersburg, regarded as one of the leading representatives of the Leningrad school of painting, most famous for her landscape paintings.

== Biography ==
Kozlovskaya was born on 7 April 1925 in Leningrad, USSR. In 1952, Kozlovskaya graduated from Leningrad Institute of Painting, Sculpture and Architecture named after Ilya Repin in Boris Ioganson personal Art Studio. Studied of Boris Fogel, Semion Abugov, Genrikh Pavlovsky, Mikhail Platunov, Alexander Zaytsev.

From 1953, Kozlovskaya participated in art exhibitions featuring landscapes, portraits, still life, and genre pictures. Her personal exhibitions were in Belgorod (1981) and Leningrad (1984).

Kozlovskaya was a member of Saint Petersburg Union of Artists (before 1992 – Leningrad branch of Union of Artists of Russian Federation) since 1954. She was a wife of well-known Russian painter Boris Korneev (1922–1973), Honored Artist of the RSFSR. Kozlovskaya died in Saint Petersburg in 2019.

Paintings by Kozlovskaya reside in art museums and private collections in Russia, France, Germany, and throughout the world.

== See also ==
- Leningrad School of Painting
- List of Russian artists
- List of 20th-century Russian painters
- List of painters of Saint Petersburg Union of Artists
- List of the Russian Landscape painters
- Saint Petersburg Union of Artists

== Bibliography ==
- Artist Marina Kozlovskaya. Exhibition of works. Catalogue. – Leningrad: Khudozhnik RSFSR, 1984. – 36 p.
- L' École de Leningrad. Auction Catalogue. – Paris: Drouot Richelieu, 16 Juin 1989. – p. 52-53.
- L' École de Leningrad. Auction Catalogue. – Paris: Drouot Richelieu, 12 Mars 1990. – p. 26-27.
- L' École de Leningrad. Auction Catalogue. – Paris: Drouot Richelieu, 11 Juin 1990. – p. 24-25.
- Peinture Russe. Catalogue. – Paris: Drouot Richelieu, 18 Fevrier, 1991. – p. 7,35.
- Peinture Russe. Catalogue. – Paris: Drouot Richelieu, 26 Avril, 1991. – p. 7,60.
- Saint-Pétersbourg – Pont-Audemer. Dessins, Gravures, Sculptures et Tableaux du XX siècle du fonds de L' Union des Artistes de Saint-Pétersbourg. – Pont-Audemer: 1994. – p. 98.
- Matthew C. Bown. Dictionary of 20th Century Russian and Soviet Painters 1900-1980s. – London: Izomar 1998. ISBN 0-9532061-0-6, ISBN 978-0-9532061-0-0.
