= Vladimir Gorb =

Russian painter (1903–1988)

Vladimir Alexandrovich Gorb
- Born: 31 December 1903; Odessa, Russian Empire
- Died: 20 October 1988 (aged 84); Leningrad, USSR
- Education: Repin Institute of Arts
- Known for: Painting, Art teaching
- Movement: Realism

Vladimir Alexandrovich Gorb (Russian: Влади́мир Алекса́ндрович Го́рб; 31 December 1903 – 20 October 1988) was a Soviet Russian painter, graphic artist, and art teacher. He lived and worked in Leningrad as professor of the Repin Institute of Arts, was awarded the title of Honoured Worker of the Arts Industry of the RSFSR, and was member of the Leningrad branch of Union of Artists of Russian Federation. He is regarded as a representative of the Leningrad School of Painting, most famous for his portrait paintings and art teaching.

== Biography ==
Vladimir Gorb was born on 31 December 1903 in Odessa, Russian Empire.

In 1920, Gorb entered the Odessa Art Institute, where he studied under Kyriak Kostandi, P. Volokidin, Teofil Frayerman, and M. Zamechek.

In 1926, after graduation, Gorb came to Leningrad and entered the Leningrad Vhutein (Higher Art and Technical Institute, the name carried from 1922 to 1930). Studied under Alexander Savinov, Arkady Rylov, Alexander Karev, Kuzma Petrov-Vodkin, Pavel Naumov, Dmitry Kiplik.

In 1930, Gorb graduated from Leningrad Vhutein. His graduate work was a painting named "Protection of Leningrad Building" (fragment of the monumental painting for the club hall).

In the years 1933-1935, Gorb engaged in postgraduate study at the Leningrad Institute of Painting, Sculpture and Architecture under the leadership of Alexander Savinov.

Gorb has participated in Art Exhibitions since 1925. He painted portraits, genre pictures, landscapes, still lifes. He worked in oils, watercolours, and pencil drawing. His personal exhibition was in Leningrad in 1967.

Gorb was most famous for portraits of his contemporaries, painted in the years 1920-1940, including prominent figures in science and art. The best of them distinguished laconic means of expression, depth and a special delicacy in the transfer of the character and spiritual world models, the desire to find and keep on canvas features of external appearance. In the years 1950-1980, Gorb also worked in landscape and still life painting.

Gorb became a member of Leningrad Union of Artists in 1937.

For more than half a century, Gorb spent his time teaching art, first in the Tavricheskaya Art School (1930–1931), then in the Secondary Art School at the All-Russian Academy of Arts (1937–1947, Director in 1942-1947), and in the Leningrad Institute of Painting, Sculpture and Architecture named after Ilya Repin (1931–1979), professor of whom he had been since 1972.

In February 1942, Gorb supervised the evacuation of Secondary Art School from blockade Leningrad first to Tbilisi, and then in Samarkand. In 1944, after the liberation of the city from the enemy blockade, Gorb led the return of the students first in Zagorsk, and in July in Leningrad.

In 1970, for his work of many years of fruitful artistic and educational activities, Gorb was awarded the honorary title of Honored Art Worker of Russian Federation.

Gorb died in Leningrad on 20 October 1988, aged 84. His paintings reside in State Russian Museum, in art museums and private collections in Russia, France, in the U.S., Ukraine, Germany, England, and throughout the world.

== See also ==
- Fine art of Leningrad
- Leningrad School of Painting
- List of Russian artists
- List of 20th-century Russian painters
- List of painters of Saint Petersburg Union of Artists
- Saint Petersburg Union of Artists

== Principal exhibitions ==
Principal Exhibitions by Vladimir Gorb
- 1951 (Leningrad): Exhibition of works by Leningrad artists of 1951, with Piotr Alberti, Vsevolod Bazhenov, Piotr Belousov, Piotr Buchkin, Rudolf Frentz, Nikolai Galakhov, Vladimir Gorb, Tatiana Kopnina, Nikolai Kostrov, Anna Kostrova, Alexander Lubimov, Evsey Moiseenko, Mikhail Natarevich, Yuri Neprintsev, Vladimir Ovchinnikov, Sergei Osipov, Alexander Pushnin, Ivan Savenko, Gleb Savinov, Alexander Samokhvalov, Vladimir Seleznev, Alexander Shmidt, Nadezhda Shteinmiller, Nikolai Timkov, Leonid Tkachenko, Mikhail Tkachev, Yuri Tulin, Igor Veselkin, Nina Veselova, Rostislav Vovkushevsky, Vecheslav Zagonek, and other important Leningrad artists.
- 1954 (Leningrad): The Spring Exhibition of works by Leningrad artists of 1954, with Evgenia Antipova, Nikolai Baskakov, Sergei Frolov, Nikolai Galakhov, Vladimir Gorb, Maya Kopitseva, Boris Korneev, Elena Kostenko, Anna Kostrova, Gevork Kotiantz, Valeria Larina, Boris Lavrenko, Ivan Lavsky, Gavriil Malish, Alexei Mozhaev, Nikolai Mukho, Samuil Nevelshtein, Yuri Neprintsev, Sergei Osipov, Lev Russov, Ivan Savenko, Vladimir Seleznev, Arseny Semionov, Alexander Shmidt, Elena Skuin, Victor Teterin, Nikolai Timkov, Mikhail Tkachev, Leonid Tkachenko, Vecheslav Zagonek, and other important Leningrad artists.
- 1955 (Leningrad): The Spring Exhibition of works by Leningrad artists of 1955, with Evgenia Antipova, Irina Baldina, Vladimir Gorb, Alexei Eriomin, Maya Kopitseva, Gevork Kotiantz, Boris Lavrenko, Ivan Lavsky, Dmitry Maevsky, Gavriil Malish, Nikolai Mukho, Lev Orekhov, Sergei Osipov, Lev Russov, Ivan Savenko, Arseny Semionov, Alexander Semionov, Yuri Shablikin, Alexander Shmidt, Elena Skuin, Nikolai Timkov, Leonid Tkachenko, Yuri Tulin, Piotr Vasiliev, Vecheslav Zagonek, Ruben Zakharian, and other important Leningrad artists.
- 1956 (Leningrad): The Fall Exhibition of works by Leningrad artists of 1956, with Piotr Alberti, Taisia Afonina, Vsevolod Bazhenov, Irina Baldina, Nikolai Baskakov, Yuri Belov, Piotr Belousov, Piotr Buchkin, Sergei Frolov, Nikolai Galakhov, Vladimir Gorb, Abram Grushko, Alexei Eriomin, Mikhail Kaneev, Marina Kozlovskaya, Tatiana Kopnina, Maya Kopitseva, Boris Korneev, Alexander Koroviakov, Elena Kostenko, Nikolai Kostrov, Anna Kostrova, Gevork Kotiantz, Yaroslav Krestovsky, Ivan Lavsky, Oleg Lomakin, Dmitry Maevsky, Gavriil Malish, Alexei Mozhaev, Nikolai Mukho, Samuil Nevelshtein, Sergei Osipov, Vladimir Ovchinnikov, Lev Russov, Ivan Savenko, Gleb Savinov, Vladimir Seleznev, Alexander Semionov, Arseny Semionov, Yuri Shablikin, Boris Shamanov, Alexander Shmidt, Nadezhda Shteinmiller, Victor Teterin, Nikolai Timkov, Mikhail Tkachev, Mikhail Trufanov, Yuri Tulin, Piotr Vasiliev, Igor Veselkin, Rostislav Vovkushevsky, Vecheslav Zagonek, Ruben Zakharian, Sergei Zakharov, and other important Leningrad artists.
- 1960 (Leningrad): Exhibition of works by Leningrad artists of 1960, with Piotr Alberti, Evgenia Antipova, Taisia Afonina, Genrikh Bagrov, Vsevolod Bazhenov, Nikolai Baskakov, Zlata Bizova, Nikolai Galakhov, Vladimir Gorb, Abram Grushko, Alexei Eriomin, Mikhail Kaneev, Mikhail Kozell, Marina Kozlovskaya, Boris Korneev, Alexander Koroviakov, Elena Kostenko, Nikolai Kostrov, Anna Kostrova, Gevork Kotiantz, Yaroslav Krestovsky, Boris Lavrenko, Ivan Lavsky, Oleg Lomakin, Dmitry Maevsky, Alexei Mozhaev, Evsey Moiseenko, Nikolai Mukho, Andrey Milnikov, Piotr Nazarov, Vera Nazina, Mikhail Natarevich, Samuil Nevelshtein, Dmitry Oboznenko, Sergei Osipov, Nikolai Pozdneev, Maria Rudnitskaya, Vladimir Sakson, Alexander Samokhvalov, Alexander Semionov, Arseny Semionov, Yuri Shablikin, Boris Shamanov, Alexander Shmidt, Elena Skuin, Alexander Stolbov, Victor Teterin, Nikolai Timkov, Yuri Tulin, Ivan Varichev, Rostislav Vovkushevsky, Vecheslav Zagonek, Ruben Zakharian, and other important Leningrad artists.
- 1960 (Leningrad): Exhibition of works by Leningrad artists of 1960, with Piotr Alberti, Evgenia Antipova, Taisia Afonina, Genrikh Bagrov, Vsevolod Bazhenov, Irina Baldina, Nikolai Baskakov, Yuri Belov, Piotr Belousov, Piotr Buchkin, Zlata Bizova, Vladimir Chekalov, Sergei Frolov, Nikolai Galakhov, Vladimir Gorb, Elena Gorokhova, Abram Grushko, Alexei Eriomin, Mikhail Kaneev, Engels Kozlov, Marina Kozlovskaya, Tatiana Kopnina, Maya Kopitseva, Boris Korneev, Alexander Koroviakov, Elena Kostenko, Nikolai Kostrov, Anna Kostrova, Gevork Kotiantz, Vladimir Krantz, Yaroslav Krestovsky, Valeria Larina, Boris Lavrenko, Ivan Lavsky, Piotr Litvinsky, Oleg Lomakin, Dmitry Maevsky, Gavriil Malish, Nikita Medovikov, Evsey Moiseenko, Nikolai Mukho, Andrey Milnikov, Vera Nazina, Mikhail Natarevich, Anatoli Nenartovich, Samuil Nevelshtein, Dmitry Oboznenko, Vladimir Ovchinnikov, Vecheslav Ovchinnikov, Sergei Osipov, Nikolai Pozdneev, Alexander Pushnin, Lev Russov, Galina Rumiantseva, Maria Rudnitskaya, Ivan Savenko, Vladimir Sakson, Gleb Savinov, Alexander Samokhvalov, Alexander Semionov, Arseny Semionov, Yuri Shablikin, Boris Shamanov, Alexander Shmidt, Nadezhda Shteinmiller, Elena Skuin, Galina Smirnova, Alexander Sokolov, Alexander Stolbov, Victor Teterin, Nikolai Timkov, Mikhail Tkachev, Leonid Tkachenko, Mikhail Trufanov, Yuri Tulin, Ivan Varichev, Anatoli Vasiliev, Valery Vatenin, Nina Veselova, Rostislav Vovkushevsky, Vecheslav Zagonek, Sergei Zakharov, Ruben Zakharian, and other important Leningrad artists.
- 1962 (Leningrad): The Fall Exhibition of works by Leningrad artists of 1962, with Piotr Alberti, Evgenia Antipova, Taisia Afonina, Vsevolod Bazhenov, Nikolai Galakhov, Yuri Belov, Vladimir Gorb, Abram Grushko, Alexei Eremin, Boris Lavrenko, Ivan Lavsky, Valeria Larina, Oleg Lomakin, Gavriil Malish, Evsey Moiseenko, Nikolai Mukho, Piotr Nazarov, Vera Nazina, Mikhail Natarevich, Dmitry Oboznenko, Lev Orekhov, Vladimir Ovchinnikov, Sergei Osipov, Nikolai Pozdneev, Galina Rumiantseva, Gleb Savinov, Alexander Semionov, Arseny Semionov, Nadezhda Shteinmiller, Alexander Tatarenko, Victor Teterin, Nikolai Timkov, Mikhail Trufanov, Yuri Tulin, Ivan Varichev, Anatoli Vasiliev, Valery Vatenin, Rostislav Vovkushevsky, Vecheslav Zagonek, and other important Leningrad artists.
- 1967 (Leningrad): Exhibition of works by Vladimir Alexandrovich Gorb in the Leningrad Union of Artists.
- 1968 (Leningrad): The Fall Exhibition of works by Leningrad artists of 1968, with Piotr Alberti, Vsevolod Bazhenov, Sergei Frolov, Nikolai Galakhov, Tatiana Gorb, Vladimir Gorb, Mikhail Kaneev, Mikhail Kozell, Engels Kozlov, Elena Kostenko, Nikolai Kostrov, Anna Kostrova, Gevork Kotiantz, Vladimir Krantz, Ivan Lavsky, Dmitry Maevsky, Gavriil Malish, Nikolai Mukho, Mikhail Natarevich, Sergei Osipov, Vladimir Ovchinnikov, Lev Orekhov, Victor Otiev, Maria Rudnitskaya, Ivan Savenko, Vladimir Sakson, Alexander Semionov, Arseny Semionov, Boris Shamanov, Alexander Shmidt, Elena Skuin, Alexander Stolbov, German Tatarinov, Mikhail Trufanov, Yuri Tulin, Ivan Varichev, Anatoli Vasiliev, Rostislav Vovkushevsky, Lazar Yazgur, Vecheslav Zagonek, Sergei Zakharov, Ruben Zakharian, and other important Leningrad artists.
- 1972 (Leningrad): Across the Motherland Exhibition of Leningrad artists dedicated to 50th Anniversary of USSR, with Evgenia Antipova, Nikolai Baskakov, Olga Bogaevskaya, Sergei Frolov, Nikolai Galakhov, Vasily Golubev, Tatiana Gorb, Vladimir Gorb, Irina Dobrekova, Mikhail Kaneev, Mikhail Kozell, Marina Kozlovskaya, Engels Kozlov, Maya Kopitseva, Boris Korneev, Elena Kostenko, Nikolai Kostrov, Anna Kostrova, Gevork Kotiantz, Yaroslav Krestovsky, Ivan Lavsky, Oleg Lomakin, Dmitry Maevsky, Gavriil Malish, Evsey Moiseenko, Piotr Nazarov, Samuil Nevelshtein, Dmitry Oboznenko, Sergei Osipov, Nikolai Pozdneev, Ivan Savenko, Gleb Savinov, Vladimir Sakson, Arseny Semionov, Alexander Sokolov, German Tatarinov, Victor Teterin, Nikolai Timkov, Mikhail Trufanov, Yuri Tulin, Vitaly Tulenev, Ivan Varichev, Igor Veselkin, Valery Vatenin, Vecheslav Zagonek, and other important Leningrad artists.
- 1973 (Leningrad): Our Contemporary The Third Exhibition of works by Leningrad artists of 1973, with Nikolai Baskakov, Yuri Belov, Nikolai Galakhov, Vladimir Gorb, Tatiana Gorb, Elena Gorokhova, Alexei Eriomin, Yuri Khukhrov, Boris Korneev, Engels Kozlov, Boris Lavrenko, Oleg Lomakin, Dmitry Maevsky, Valentina Monakhova, Vera Nazina, Dmitry Oboznenko, Nikolai Pozdneev, Galina Rumiantseva, Alexander Stolbov, Anatoli Vasiliev, and other important Leningrad artists.
- 1978 (Leningrad): The Fall Exhibition of works by Leningrad artists of 1978, with Piotr Alberti, Taisia Afonina, Genrikh Bagrov, Irina Baldina, Nikolai Baskakov, Evgenia Baykova, Vsevolod Bazhenov, Piotr Belousov, Veniamin Borisov, Zlata Bizova, Evgeny Chuprun, Sergei Frolov, Nikolai Galakhov, Vladimir Gorb, Irina Dobrekova, Alexei Eriomin, Mikhail Kaneev, Yuri Khukhrov, Maya Kopitseva, Elena Kostenko, Nikolai Kostrov, Anna Kostrova, Gevork Kotiantz, Mikhail Kozell, Marina Kozlovskaya, Vladimir Krantz, Dmitry Maevsky, Gavriil Malish, Nikolai Mukho, Vera Nazina, Alexander Naumov, Dmitry Oboznenko, Victor Otiev, Evgeny Pozdniakov, Alexander Semionov, Yuri Shablikin, Boris Shamanov, Alexander Stolbov, Alexander Tatarenko, German Tatarinov, Nikolai Timkov, Leonid Tkachenko, Yuri Tulin, Vitaly Tulenev, Ivan Varichev, Anatoli Vasiliev, Ruben Zakharian, and other important Leningrad artists.

== Bibliography ==
- Exhibition of works by Leningrad artists of 1947. Exhibition Catalogue. - Leningrad: Leningrad Union of Artists, 1948.
- Exhibition of works by Leningrad artists of 1951. Exhibition Catalogue. - Leningrad: Lenizdat Edition, 1951. - p. 10.
- Spring Exhibition of works by Leningrad artists of 1954. Exhibition Catalogue. - Leningrad: Izogiz Edition, 1954. - p. 9.
- The Spring Exhibition of works by Leningrad artists of 1955. Catalogue. - Leningrad: Leningrad Union of Artists, 1956. - p. 9.
- Autumn Exhibition of works by Leningrad artists of 1956. Exhibition Catalogue. - Leningrad: Leningrad Artist Edition, 1958. - p. 9.
- Exhibition of works by Leningrad artists of 1960. Exhibition catalogue. - Leningrad: Khudozhnik RSFSR, 1963. - p. 8.
- Exhibition of works by Leningrad artists of 1960. Exhibition catalogue. - Leningrad: Khudozhnik RSFSR, 1961. - p. 14.
- Autumn Exhibition of works by Leningrad artists of 1962. Exhibition Catalogue. - Leningrad: : Khudozhnik RSFSR, 1962. - p. 11.
- Exhibition of works by Vladimir Alexandrovich Gorb. Catalogue. - Leningrad: Khudozhnik RSFSR, 1967.
- The Fall Exhibition of works by Leningrad artists of 1968. Catalogue. - Leningrad: Khudozhnik RSFSR, 1971. - p. 7.
- Across the Motherland Exhibition of Leningrad artists. Catalogue. - Leningrad: Khudozhnik RSFSR, 1974. - p. 12.
- Art works by Russian Federation Artists grants to Museums and Culture Institutions (1963–1971). Official Catalogue. - Moscow: Russian Federation Union of Artists, 1972. - p. 27.
- The Still-Life Exhibition of works by Leningrad artists. Exhibition catalogue. - Leningrad: Khudozhnik RSFSR, 1973. - p. 8.
- Exhibitions of Soviet art. Directory. Volume 3. 1941 - 1947. - Moscow: Soviet Artist, 1973. - pp. 342, 375.
- Our Contemporary The Third Exhibition of works by Leningrad artists of 1973. Catalogue. - Leningrad: Khudozhnik RSFSR, 1974. - p. 7.
- Autumn Exhibition of works by Leningrad artists of 1978. Exhibition Catalogue. - Leningrad: Khudozhnik RSFSR, 1983. - p. 7.
- Directory of members of the Union of Artists of USSR. Volume 1. - Moscow: Soviet artist, 1979. - p. 266.
- Exhibitions of Soviet art. Directory. Volume 5. 1954 - 1958. - Moscow: Soviet Artist, 1981. - pp. 25, 27, 142, 258, 261.
- Directory of members of the Leningrad branch of Union of Artists of Russian Federation. - Leningrad: Khudozhnik RSFSR, 1987. - p. 31.
- Matthew C. Bown. Dictionary of 20th Century Russian and Soviet Painters 1900-1980s. - London: Izomar, 1998. ISBN 0-9532061-0-6, ISBN 978-0-9532061-0-0.
- Link of Times: 1932 - 1997. Artists - Members of Saint Petersburg Union of Artists of Russia. Exhibition catalogue. - Saint Petersburg: Manezh Central Exhibition Hall, 1997. - p. 286.
- Sergei V. Ivanov. Unknown Socialist Realism. The Leningrad School.- Saint Petersburg: NP-Print Edition, 2007. – pp. 15, 17, 357, 359, 360, 366, 384, 387-390, 392-398, 442. ISBN 5-901724-21-6, ISBN 978-5-901724-21-7.
- Anniversary Directory graduates of Saint Petersburg State Academic Institute of Painting, Sculpture, and Architecture named after Ilya Repin, Russian Academy of Arts. 1915 - 2005. - Saintetersburg: Pervotsvet Publishing House, 2007. p. 33. ISBN 978-5-903677-01-6.
- Portrait painting of 1920-1990s. The Leningrad School. Part 1
