= Zlata Bizova =

Russian artist

Zlata Nikolaevna Bizova
- Born: 29 March 1927; Leningrad, USSR
- Died: 8 August 2013 (aged 86)
- Education: Repin Institute of Arts
- Known for: Painting, Graphics
- Movement: Realism

Zlata Nikolaevna Bizova (Russian: Зла́та Никола́евна Бызо́ва; 29 March 1927 – 8 August 2013) was a Russian Soviet realist painter and graphic artist, who lived and worked in Saint Petersburg (former Leningrad). She was a member of the Saint Petersburg Union of Artists (before 1992 named as the Leningrad branch of Union of Artists of Russian Federation) and is regarded as one of representatives of the Leningrad school of painting. She graduated from the Repin Institute of Arts in 1957 and painted genre scenes, landscapes, portraits, and still-lifes.

== Biography ==
Zlata Nikolaevna Bizova was born on 29 March 1927 in Leningrad.

In 1951, Zlata Bizova entered at the Department of Painting of the Leningrad Institute of Painting, Sculpture and Architecture named after Ilya Repin, there she studied under noted art educators Alexander Zaytsev, Vasily Sokolov, Piotr Belousov, and Leonid Khudiakov.

In 1957 Zlata Bizova graduated from the Leningrad Institute of Painting, Sculpture and Architecture as artist of painting in Boris Ioganson workshop, together with Ilya Glazunov, Elena Gorokhova, Vladimir Malevsky, Galina Rumiantseva, Ivan Varichev, Dmitry Oboznenko, and other young artists. Her graduation work was genre painting "The first days of the organization of the collective farm".

Since 1957 Zlata Bizova has participated in Art Exhibitions. She painted genre scenes, landscapes, portraits, still-life, etudes done from nature.

Zlata Bizova is a member of the Saint Petersburg Union of Artists (before 1992 named as the Leningrad branch of Union of Artists of Russian Federation) since 1960.

Paintings by Zlata Bizova reside in Art Museums and private collections in Russia, France, Germany, Belgium, in the U.S., Italy, Japan, Norway, Korea, and others.

== Principal exhibitions ==
Principal Exhibitions by Zlata Bizova
- 1957 (Leningrad): 1917 - 1957. Leningrad Artist's works of Art Exhibition, with Evgenia Antipova, Vsevolod Bazhenov, Irina Baldina, Nikolai Baskakov, Piotr Belousov, Piotr Buchkin, Zlata Bizova, Vladimir Chekalov, Sergei Frolov, Nikolai Galakhov, Abram Grushko, Alexei Eriomin, Mikhail Kaneev, Engels Kozlov, Tatiana Kopnina, Maya Kopitseva, Boris Korneev, Alexander Koroviakov, Nikolai Kostrov, Anna Kostrova, Gevork Kotiantz, Yaroslav Krestovsky, Boris Lavrenko, Ivan Lavsky, Oleg Lomakin, Dmitry Maevsky, Gavriil Malish, Alexei Mozhaev, Evsey Moiseenko, Nikolai Mukho, Mikhail Natarevich, Samuil Nevelshtein, Dmitry Oboznenko, Lev Orekhov, Sergei Osipov, Vladimir Ovchinnikov, Nikolai Pozdneev, Alexander Pushnin, Lev Russov, Galina Rumiantseva, Ivan Savenko, Gleb Savinov, Alexander Samokhvalov, Arseny Semionov, Alexander Mikhailovich Semionov, Boris Shamanov, Alexander Shmidt, Nadezhda Shteinmiller, Galina Smirnova, Ivan Sorokin, Victor Teterin, Mikhail Tkachev, Leonid Tkachenko, Yuri Tulin, Ivan Varichev, Nina Veselova, Rostislav Vovkushevsky, Anatoli Vasiliev, Vecheslav Zagonek, Ruben Zakharian, Sergei Zakharov, Maria Zubreeva, and other important Leningrad artists.
- 1957 (Moscow): All-Union Art Exhibition of 1957 dedicated to the 40th Anniversary of October Revolution, with Vsevolod Bazhenov, Nikolai Baskakov, Irina Baldina, Piotr Belousov, Piotr Buchkin, Zlata Bizova, Nikolai Galakhov, Elena Gorokhova, Alexei Eriomin, Engels Kozlov, Maya Kopitseva, Boris Korneev, Boris Lavrenko, Oleg Lomakin, Nikita Medovikov, Evsey Moiseenko, Mikhail Natarevich, Samuil Nevelshtein, Yuri Neprintsev, Dmitry Oboznenko, Vladimir Ovchinnikov, Nikolai Pozdneev, Alexander Pushnin, Ivan Savenko, Gleb Savinov, Alexander Samokhvalov, Alexander Semionov, Nadezhda Shteinmiller, Victor Teterin, Nikolai Timkov, Mikhail Trufanov, Yuri Tulin, Ivan Varichev, Piotr Vasiliev, Nina Veselova, Sergei Zakharov, Maria Zubreeba, and other important Leningrad artists.
- 1958 (Leningrad): The Fall Exhibition of works by Leningrad artists of 1958, with Taisia Afonina, Irina Baldina, Evgenia Baykova, Vsevolod Bazhenov, Piotr Belousov, Yuri Belov, Zlata Bizova, Sergei Frolov, Nikolai Galakhov, Elena Gorokhova, Abram Grushko, Alexei Eriomin, Mikhail Kaneev, Marina Kozlovskaya, Tatiana Kopnina, Boris Korneev, Alexander Koroviakov, Elena Kostenko, Nikolai Kostrov, Anna Kostrova, Gevork Kotiantz, Yaroslav Krestovsky, Valeria Larina, Boris Lavrenko, Ivan Lavsky, Piotr Litvinsky, Oleg Lomakin, Dmitry Maevsky, Gavriil Malish, Alexei Mozhaev, Evsey Moiseenko, Nikolai Mukho, Anatoli Nenartovich, Yuri Neprintsev, Dmitry Oboznenko, Sergei Osipov, Vladimir Ovchinnikov, Nikolai Pozdneev, Alexander Pushnin, Maria Rudnitskaya, Galina Rumiantseva, Lev Russov, Ivan Savenko, Gleb Savinov, Alexander Samokhvalov, Arseny Semionov, Alexander Semionov, Yuri Shablikin, Boris Shamanov, Alexander Shmidt, Nadezhda Shteinmiller, Elena Skuin, Nikolai Timkov, Yuri Tulin, Ivan Varichev, Anatoli Vasiliev, Piotr Vasiliev, Igor Veselkin, Vecheslav Zagonek, and other important Leningrad artists.
- 1960 (Leningrad): Exhibition of works by Leningrad artists of 1960, with Piotr Alberti, Evgenia Antipova, Taisia Afonina, Genrikh Bagrov, Vsevolod Bazhenov, Nikolai Baskakov, Zlata Bizova, Nikolai Galakhov, Vladimir Gorb, Abram Grushko, Alexei Eriomin, Mikhail Kaneev, Mikhail Kozell, Marina Kozlovskaya, Boris Korneev, Alexander Koroviakov, Elena Kostenko, Nikolai Kostrov, Anna Kostrova, Gevork Kotiantz, Yaroslav Krestovsky, Boris Lavrenko, Ivan Lavsky, Oleg Lomakin, Dmitry Maevsky, Alexei Mozhaev, Evsey Moiseenko, Nikolai Mukho, Andrey Milnikov, Piotr Nazarov, Vera Nazina, Mikhail Natarevich, Samuil Nevelshtein, Dmitry Oboznenko, Sergei Osipov, Nikolai Pozdneev, Maria Rudnitskaya, Vladimir Sakson, Alexander Samokhvalov, Alexander Semionov, Arseny Semionov, Yuri Shablikin, Boris Shamanov, Alexander Shmidt, Elena Skuin, Alexander Stolbov, Victor Teterin, Nikolai Timkov, Yuri Tulin, Ivan Varichev, Rostislav Vovkushevsky, Vecheslav Zagonek, Ruben Zakharian, and other important Leningrad artists.
- 1960 (Leningrad): Exhibition of works by Leningrad artists of 1960, with Piotr Alberti, Evgenia Antipova, Taisia Afonina, Genrikh Bagrov, Vsevolod Bazhenov, Irina Baldina, Nikolai Baskakov, Yuri Belov, Piotr Belousov, Piotr Buchkin, Zlata Bizova, Vladimir Chekalov, Nikolai Galakhov, Vladimir Gorb, Elena Gorokhova, Abram Grushko, Alexei Eriomin, Mikhail Kaneev, Engels Kozlov, Marina Kozlovskaya, Tatiana Kopnina, Maya Kopitseva, Boris Korneev, Alexander Koroviakov, Elena Kostenko, Nikolai Kostrov, Anna Kostrova, Gevork Kotiantz, Vladimir Krantz, Yaroslav Krestovsky, Valeria Larina, Boris Lavrenko, Ivan Lavsky, Piotr Litvinsky, Oleg Lomakin, Dmitry Maevsky, Gavriil Malish, Nikita Medovikov, Evsey Moiseenko, Nikolai Mukho, Andrey Milnikov, Vera Nazina, Mikhail Natarevich, Anatoli Nenartovich, Samuil Nevelshtein, Dmitry Oboznenko, Vladimir Ovchinnikov, Vecheslav Ovchinnikov, Sergei Osipov, Nikolai Pozdneev, Alexander Pushnin, Lev Russov, Galina Rumiantseva, Maria Rudnitskaya, Ivan Savenko, Vladimir Sakson, Gleb Savinov, Alexander Samokhvalov, Alexander Semionov, Arseny Semionov, Yuri Shablikin, Boris Shamanov, Alexander Shmidt, Nadezhda Shteinmiller, Elena Skuin, Galina Smirnova, Alexander Sokolov, Alexander Stolbov, Victor Teterin, Nikolai Timkov, Mikhail Tkachev, Leonid Tkachenko, Mikhail Trufanov, Yuri Tulin, Ivan Varichev, Anatoli Vasiliev, Valery Vatenin, Nina Veselova, Rostislav Vovkushevsky, Vecheslav Zagonek, Sergei Zakharov, Ruben Zakharian, and other important Leningrad artists.
- 1961 (Leningrad): Exhibition of works by Leningrad artists of 1961, with Piotr Alberti, Evgenia Antipova, Taisia Afonina, Vsevolod Bazhenov, Irina Baldina, Nikolai Baskakov, Yuri Belov, Piotr Belousov, Piotr Buchkin, Zlata Bizova, Nikolai Galakhov, Elena Gorokhova, Abram Grushko, Alexei Eriomin, Mikhail Kaneev, Mikhail Kozell, Engels Kozlov, Marina Kozlovskaya, Maya Kopitseva, Boris Korneev, Elena Kostenko, Gevork Kotiantz, Yaroslav Krestovsky, Valeria Larina, Boris Lavrenko, Ivan Lavsky, Oleg Lomakin, Dmitry Maevsky, Gavriil Malish, Nikita Medovikov, Evsey Moiseenko, Alexei Mozhaev, Nikolai Mukho, Vera Nazina, Mikhail Natarevich, Anatoli Nenartovich, Samuil Nevelshtein, Yuri Neprintsev, Dmitry Oboznenko, Sergei Osipov, Vladimir Ovchinnikov, Nikolai Pozdneev, Alexander Pushnin, Galina Rumiantseva, Lev Russov, Maria Rudnitskaya, Ivan Savenko, Gleb Savinov, Vladimir Sakson, Alexander Samokhvalov, Vladimir Seleznev, Arseny Semionov, Alexander Semionov, Yuri Shablikin, Boris Shamanov, Alexander Shmidt, Nadezhda Shteinmiller, Elena Skuin, Smirnova Galina, Alexander Sokolov, Alexander Stolbov, Victor Teterin, Nikolai Timkov, Leonid Tkachenko, Mikhail Trufanov, Yuri Tulin, Ivan Varichev, Anatoli Vasiliev, Piotr Vasiliev, Valery Vatenin, Leonid Yazgur, Vecheslav Zagonek, Sergei Zakharov, Maria Zubreeva, and other important Leningrad artists.
- 1964 (Leningrad): The Leningrad Fine Arts Exhibition, with Piotr Alberti, Evgenia Antipova, Taisia Afonina, Irina Baldina, Nikolai Baskakov, Evgenia Baykova, Vsevolod Bazhenov, Yuri Belov, Piotr Belousov, Piotr Buchkin, Zlata Bizova, Vladimir Chekalov, Nikolai Galakhov, Vasily Golubev, Tatiana Gorb, Abram Grushko, Alexei Eriomin, Mikhail Kaneev, Mikhail Kozell, Marina Kozlovskaya, Tatiana Kopnina, Maya Kopitseva, Boris Korneev, Alexander Koroviakov, Elena Kostenko, Gevork Kotiantz, Yaroslav Krestovsky, Valeria Larina, Boris Lavrenko, Ivan Lavsky, Piotr Litvinsky, Oleg Lomakin, Dmitry Maevsky, Gavriil Malish, Evsey Moiseenko, Nikolai Mukho, Piotr Nazarov, Vera Nazina, Mikhail Natarevich, Anatoli Nenartovich, Yuri Neprintsev, Dmitry Oboznenko, Sergei Osipov, Vladimir Ovchinnikov, Nikolai Pozdneev, Alexander Pushnin, Galina Rumiantseva, Ivan Savenko, Gleb Savinov, Vladimir Sakson, Alexander Samokhvalov, Vladimir Seleznev, Arseny Semionov, Alexander Semionov, Yuri Shablikin, Boris Shamanov, Alexander Shmidt, Nadezhda Shteinmiller, Elena Skuin, Smirnova Galina, Alexander Sokolov, Ivan Sorokin, Victor Teterin, Nikolai Timkov, Mikhail Tkachev, Mikhail Trufanov, Yuri Tulin, Vitaly Tulenev, Ivan Varichev, Anatoli Vasiliev, Piotr Vasiliev, Valery Vatenin, Leonid Yazgur, Vecheslav Zagonek, Sergei Zakharov, Ruben Zakharian, and other important Leningrad artists.
- 1978 (Leningrad): The Fall Exhibition of works by Leningrad artists of 1978, with Piotr Alberti, Taisia Afonina, Genrikh Bagrov, Irina Baldina, Nikolai Baskakov, Evgenia Baykova, Vsevolod Bazhenov, Piotr Belousov, Veniamin Borisov, Zlata Bizova, Evgeny Chuprun, Nikolai Galakhov, Vladimir Gorb, Irina Dobrekova, Mikhail Kaneev, Yuri Khukhrov, Mikhail Kozell, Marina Kozlovskaya, Maya Kopitseva, Elena Kostenko, Nikolai Kostrov, Anna Kostrova, Gevork Kotiantz, Vladimir Krantz, Dmitry Maevsky, Gavriil Malish, Nikolai Mukho, Vera Nazina, Alexander Naumov, Dmitry Oboznenko, Victor Otiev, Evgeny Pozdniakov, Alexander Semionov, Yuri Shablikin, Boris Shamanov, Alexander Stolbov, Alexander Tatarenko, German Tatarinov, Nikolai Timkov, Leonid Tkachenko, Yuri Tulin, Vitaly Tulenev, Ivan Varichev, Anatoli Vasiliev, Ruben Zakharian, and other important Leningrad artists.
- 1994 (Saint Petersburg): Etudes done from nature in creativity of the Leningrad School's artists, with Piotr Alberti, Taisia Afonina, Evgenia Antipova, Vsevolod Bazhenov, Irina Baldina, Veniamin Borisov, Zlata Bizova, Vladimir Chekalov, Evgeny Chuprun, Nikolai Galakhov, Tatiana Gorb, Abram Grushko, Irina Dobrekova, Alexei Eriomin, Mikhail Kaneev, Yuri Khukhrov, Mikhail Kozell, Maya Kopitseva, Marina Kozlovskaya, Boris Korneev, Alexander Koroviakov, Elena Kostenko, Piotr Litvinsky, Boris Lavrenko, Ivan Lavsky, Dmitry Maevsky, Alexei Mozhaev, Valentina Monakhova, Nikolai Mukho, Mikhail Natarevich, Alexander Naumov, Anatoli Nenartovich, Dmitry Oboznenko, Lev Orekhov, Sergei Osipov, Vladimir Ovchinnikov, Victor Otiev, Nikolai Pozdneev, Evgeny Pozdniakov, Galina Rumiantseva, Kapitolina Rumiantseva, Lev Russov, Alexander Samokhvalov, Alexander Semionov, Nadezhda Shteinmiller, German Tatarinov, Nikolai Timkov, Mikhail Tkachev, Leonid Tkachenko, Anatoli Vasiliev, Igor Veselkin, Lazar Yazgur, Vecheslav Zagonek, Ruben Zakharian, and other important Leningrad artists.

== See also ==
- Leningrad School of Painting
- House of creativity «Staraya Ladoga»
- List of painters of Saint Petersburg Union of Artists
- List of the Russian Landscape painters
- Saint Petersburg Union of Artists

== Bibliography ==
- 1917 - 1957. Exhibition of works by Leningrad artists of 1957. Exhibition Catalogue. - Leningrad: Khudozhnik RSFSR, 1958. - p. 10.
- All-Union Art Exhibition of 1957 dedicated to the 40th Anniversary of October Revolution. Catalogue. - Moscow: Soviet artist, 1957. - p. 15.
- Autumn Exhibition of works by Leningrad artists of 1958. Exhibition Catalogue. - Leningrad: Khudozhnik RSFSR, 1959. - p. 7.
- All-Union Art Exhibition dedicated to 40th Anniversary of Komsomol. Catalogue. - Moscow: Ministry of Culture of USSR, 1958.
- Exhibition of works by Leningrad artists of 1960. Exhibition catalogue. - Leningrad: Khudozhnik RSFSR, 1963. - p. 8.
- Exhibition of works by Leningrad artists of 1960. Exhibition catalogue. - Leningrad: Khudozhnik RSFSR, 1961. - p. 10.
- Soviet Russia republic exhibition of 1960. Exhibition catalogue. - Moscow: Ministry of culture of Russian Federation, 1960. - p. 20.
- Exhibition of works by Leningrad artists of 1961. Exhibition catalogue. - Leningrad: Khudozhnik RSFSR, 1964. - p. 9.
- The Leningrad Fine Arts Exhibition. - Leningrad: Khudozhnik RSFSR, 1965. - p. 13.
- Artists of the USSR. Biography Dictionary. Volume 2. - Moscow: Iskusstvo Edition, 1970. - pp. 133–134.
- Art works by Russian Federation Artists grants to Museums and Culture Institutions (1963–1971). Official Catalogue. - Moscow: Russian Federation Union of Artists, 1972. - p. 21.
- Autumn Exhibition of works by Leningrad artists of 1978. Exhibition Catalogue. - Leningrad: Khudozhnik RSFSR, 1983. - p. 6.
- Directory of members of the Union of Artists of USSR. Volume 1. - Moscow: Soviet artist, 1979. - p. 166.
- Regional Exhibition of works by Leningrad artists of 1980. Exhibition catalogue. - Leningrad: Khudozhnik RSFSR, 1983. - p. 11.
- Exhibitions of Soviet art. Directory. Volume 5. 1954 - 1958. - Moscow: Soviet Artist, 1981. - pp. 372, 385, 528, 531, 548.
- Directory of members of the Leningrad branch of Union of Artists of Russian Federation. - Leningrad: Khudozhnik RSFSR, 1987. - p. 20.
- L' École de Leningrad. Catalogue. - Paris: Drouot Richelieu, 11 June 1990. - pp. 160–161.
- Etudes done from nature by the Leningrad School's artists. Exhibition catalogue. - Saint Petersburg: Nikolai Nekrasov Memorial museum, 1994. - p. 3.
- Irina Romanycheva. Academic Dacha. History and traditions. - Saint Petersburg: Petropol Publishing House, 2009. - p. 113.
- Sergei V. Ivanov. Unknown Socialist Realism. The Leningrad School. - Saint Petersburg: NP-Print Edition, 2007. – pp. 203, 218, 358, 391-393, 405, 415, 416, 422. ISBN 5-901724-21-6, ISBN 978-5-901724-21-7.
- Anniversary Directory graduates of Saint Petersburg State Academic Institute of Painting, Sculpture, and Architecture named after Ilya Repin, Russian Academy of Arts. 1915 - 2005. - Saint Petersburg: Pervotsvet Publishing House, 2007. p. 77. ISBN 978-5-903677-01-6.
