= Elena Kostenko =

Russian artist (1926–2019)

Elena Mikhailovna Kostenko
- Born: 9 August 1926; Leningrad, Soviet Union
- Died: 26 September 2019 (aged 93)
- Education: Repin Institute of Arts
- Movement: Realism

Elena Mikhailovna Kostenko (Russian: Еле́на Миха́йловна Косте́нко; 9 August 1926 – 26 September 2019) was a Soviet painter. She lived and worked in Saint Petersburg and was a member of the Saint Petersburg Union of Artists (known as the Leningrad branch of the Union of Artists of the Russian Federation until 1992). Regarded as one of the major representatives of the Leningrad school of painting, Kostenko was most famous for her portraits.

== Biography ==
Elena Mikhailovna Kostenko was born on 9 August 1926 in Leningrad. Her father, Mikhail Kostenko, was an Academician of the Academy of Sciences of the USSR, one of the major organizers of Soviet science.

In 1938, Elena Kostenko entered the Leningrad Secondary Art School under the All-Russian Academy of Arts completing in 1946. Her teachers were Leonid Ovsyannikov, Alexander Zaytsev, Leonid Sholokhov, Alexander Debler, Vladimir Gorb. At the Leningrad Secondary Art School, Kostenko studied alongside many artists and sculptors who later became well-known, including Mikhail Anikushin, Evgenia Antipova, Vladimir Chekalov, Abram Grushko, Iya Venkova, Maya Kopitseva, Anatoli Levitin, Oleg Lomakin, Nina Veselova, Vecheslav Zagonek, Alexei Eriomin, Marina Kozlovskaya, Yuri Tulin, Victor Teterin, and others.

In 1946, after graduating from Secondary Art School Kostenko entered the painting faculty of the Leningrad Institute of Painting, Sculpture and Architecture named after Ilya Repin. She studied of Semion Abugov, Yuri Neprintsev, Mikhail Platunov, Andrei Mylnikov.

In 1952, Kostenko graduated from Leningrad Institute of Painting, Sculpture and Architecture named after Ilya Repin in Viktor Oreshnikov personal Art Studio, together with Irina Baldina, Boris Lavrenko, Vladimir Chekalov, Boris Korneev, Abram Grushko, Oleg Lomakin, Alexei Eriomin, Marina Kozlovskaya, and well-known other artists. Her graduation work was genre painting "Future Builders. Kindergarten". Close creative bonds and friendships with them remained with her for many years.

In1952, Kostenko began to participate in art exhibitions of Leningrad artists. Her first exhibition was the demonstration of graduates of the Repin Institute of 1952. In the spring of the next year, she participated in the citywide "Spring exhibition of works by Leningrad artists of 1953" with her first independent creative work, "A Portrait of sculptor A. Kryzhanovskaya" (1953). The work was featured and placed in the reproduction of the exhibition catalogue.

Since then, the portrait has become a leading genre for Kostenko. In different years, she focused on working on still lifes, landscapes, and genre scenes. But the greatest fame and recognition would come from her portraits of contemporaries – men of science and art, as well as children's images. Among the portraits created by Kostenko in 1950–1970 are "Portrait of actress Galina Korotkevich" (1956), "Portrait of A. Shennikov, Academician of the Academy of Sciences of the USSR" (1960), "Portrait of P. Baranov, Academician of the Academy of Sciences of the USSR" (1961), "Portrait of M. Kostenko, Academician of the Academy of Sciences of the USSR" (1963), "Portrait of artist Mikhail Platunov" (1972), "Portrait of Academician V. Sochava" (1976), and others.

During these years, Kostenko many painted children and youth, with interest continuing the theme begun in graduation picture. Among the works created by her "Portrait of schoolgirl Ira Zykova" (1953), "After the Bathing" (1964), "Portrait of Lena Molteninova" (1975), "Katya" (1960) and "Mikhail" (1960), "Friends" (1974), "Morning" (1967), and others.

As models for her portraits, Elena Kostenko often chose her relatives, especially her sons, Vladimir and Mikhail. This allows to convey in the work of a special "thrill of life", to achieve full contact between artist and model, as well as of a certain view of man, which in the opinion of Elena Kostenko is the most important in the art of portrait. Among them are works "Offended" (1963), "Winter Morning" (1964), "Portrait of son" (1969), "Students" (1977), fairly attributable to the undoubted success of the author.

Elena Kostenko was a member of Saint Petersburg Union of Artists (before 1992 named as the Leningrad branch of Union of Artists of Russian Federation) since 1953. Her personal exhibitions were in Belgorod (1981, together with Marina Kozlovskaya) and in Leningrad (1986). In 1989–1992 her paintings were exhibited at the exhibitions and auctions of Russian paintings L'Ecole de Leningrad and others in France, Belgium, United Kingdom.

Paintings by Elena Mikhailovna Kostenko reside in Art museums and private collections in Russia, France, Japan, Italy, in the U.S., England, and throughout the world.

== See also ==
- List of 20th-century Russian painters
- List of painters of Saint Petersburg Union of Artists

== Principal exhibitions ==
See Principal exhibitions by Elena Kostenko
- 1954 (Leningrad): The Spring Exhibition of works by Leningrad artists of 1954, with Evgenia Antipova, Nikolai Baskakov, Sergei Frolov, Nikolai Galakhov, Vladimir Gorb, Maya Kopitseva, Boris Korneev, Elena Kostenko, Anna Kostrova, Gevork Kotiantz, Valeria Larina, Boris Lavrenko, Ivan Lavsky, Gavriil Malish, Alexei Mozhaev, Nikolai Mukho, Samuil Nevelshtein, Yuri Neprintsev, Sergei Osipov, Lev Russov, Ivan Savenko, Vladimir Seleznev, Arseny Semionov, Alexander Shmidt, Elena Skuin, Victor Teterin, Nikolai Timkov, Mikhail Tkachev, Leonid Tkachenko, Vecheslav Zagonek, and other important Leningrad artists.
- 1956 (Leningrad): The Fall Exhibition of works by Leningrad artists of 1956, with Piotr Alberti, Taisia Afonina, Vsevolod Bazhenov, Irina Baldina, Nikolai Baskakov, Yuri Belov, Piotr Belousov, Piotr Buchkin, Sergei Frolov, Nikolai Galakhov, Vladimir Gorb, Abram Grushko, Alexei Eriomin, Mikhail Kaneev, Marina Kozlovskaya, Tatiana Kopnina, Maya Kopitseva, Boris Korneev, Alexander Koroviakov, Elena Kostenko, Nikolai Kostrov, Anna Kostrova, Gevork Kotiantz, Yaroslav Krestovsky, Ivan Lavsky, Oleg Lomakin, Dmitry Maevsky, Gavriil Malish, Alexei Mozhaev, Nikolai Mukho, Samuil Nevelshtein, Sergei Osipov, Vladimir Ovchinnikov, Lev Russov, Ivan Savenko, Gleb Savinov, Vladimir Seleznev, Alexander Semionov, Arseny Semionov, Yuri Shablikin, Boris Shamanov, Alexander Shmidt, Nadezhda Shteinmiller, Victor Teterin, Nikolai Timkov, Mikhail Tkachev, Mikhail Trufanov, Yuri Tulin, Piotr Vasiliev, Igor Veselkin, Rostislav Vovkushevsky, Vecheslav Zagonek, Ruben Zakharian, Sergei Zakharov, and other important Leningrad artists.
- 1958 (Leningrad): The Fall Exhibition of works by Leningrad artists of 1958, with Taisia Afonina, Irina Baldina, Evgenia Baykova, Vsevolod Bazhenov, Piotr Belousov, Yuri Belov, Zlata Bizova, Sergei Frolov, Nikolai Galakhov, Elena Gorokhova, Abram Grushko, Alexei Eriomin, Mikhail Kaneev, Marina Kozlovskaya, Tatiana Kopnina, Boris Korneev, Alexander Koroviakov, Elena Kostenko, Nikolai Kostrov, Anna Kostrova, Gevork Kotiantz, Yaroslav Krestovsky, Valeria Larina, Boris Lavrenko, Ivan Lavsky, Piotr Litvinsky, Oleg Lomakin, Dmitry Maevsky, Gavriil Malish, Alexei Mozhaev, Evsey Moiseenko, Nikolai Mukho, Anatoli Nenartovich, Yuri Neprintsev, Dmitry Oboznenko, Sergei Osipov, Vladimir Ovchinnikov, Nikolai Pozdneev, Alexander Pushnin, Maria Rudnitskaya, Galina Rumiantseva, Lev Russov, Ivan Savenko, Gleb Savinov, Alexander Samokhvalov, Arseny Semionov, Alexander Semionov, Yuri Shablikin, Boris Shamanov, Alexander Shmidt, Nadezhda Shteinmiller, Elena Skuin, Alexander Sokolov, Nikolai Timkov, Yuri Tulin, Ivan Varichev, Anatoli Vasiliev, Piotr Vasiliev, Igor Veselkin, Vecheslav Zagonek, and other important Leningrad artists.
- 1960 (Leningrad): Exhibition of works by Leningrad artists of 1960, with Piotr Alberti, Evgenia Antipova, Taisia Afonina, Genrikh Bagrov, Vsevolod Bazhenov, Nikolai Baskakov, Zlata Bizova, Nikolai Galakhov, Vladimir Gorb, Abram Grushko, Alexei Eriomin, Mikhail Kaneev, Mikhail Kozell, Marina Kozlovskaya, Boris Korneev, Alexander Koroviakov, Elena Kostenko, Nikolai Kostrov, Anna Kostrova, Gevork Kotiantz, Yaroslav Krestovsky, Boris Lavrenko, Ivan Lavsky, Oleg Lomakin, Dmitry Maevsky, Alexei Mozhaev, Evsey Moiseenko, Nikolai Mukho, Andrey Milnikov, Piotr Nazarov, Vera Nazina, Mikhail Natarevich, Samuil Nevelshtein, Dmitry Oboznenko, Sergei Osipov, Nikolai Pozdneev, Maria Rudnitskaya, Vladimir Sakson, Alexander Samokhvalov, Alexander Semionov, Arseny Semionov, Yuri Shablikin, Boris Shamanov, Alexander Shmidt, Elena Skuin, Alexander Sokolov, Alexander Stolbov, Victor Teterin, Nikolai Timkov, Yuri Tulin, Ivan Varichev, Rostislav Vovkushevsky, Vecheslav Zagonek, Ruben Zakharian, and other important Leningrad artists.
- 1960 (Leningrad): Exhibition of works by Leningrad artists of 1960, with Piotr Alberti, Evgenia Antipova, Taisia Afonina, Genrikh Bagrov, Vsevolod Bazhenov, Irina Baldina, Nikolai Baskakov, Yuri Belov, Piotr Belousov, Piotr Buchkin, Zlata Bizova, Vladimir Chekalov, Sergei Frolov, Nikolai Galakhov, Vladimir Gorb, Elena Gorokhova, Abram Grushko, Alexei Eriomin, Mikhail Kaneev, Engels Kozlov, Marina Kozlovskaya, Tatiana Kopnina, Maya Kopitseva, Boris Korneev, Alexander Koroviakov, Elena Kostenko, Nikolai Kostrov, Anna Kostrova, Gevork Kotiantz, Vladimir Krantz, Yaroslav Krestovsky, Valeria Larina, Boris Lavrenko, Ivan Lavsky, Piotr Litvinsky, Oleg Lomakin, Dmitry Maevsky, Gavriil Malish, Nikita Medovikov, Evsey Moiseenko, Nikolai Mukho, Andrey Milnikov, Vera Nazina, Mikhail Natarevich, Anatoli Nenartovich, Samuil Nevelshtein, Dmitry Oboznenko, Vladimir Ovchinnikov, Vecheslav Ovchinnikov, Sergei Osipov, Nikolai Pozdneev, Alexander Pushnin, Lev Russov, Galina Rumiantseva, Maria Rudnitskaya, Ivan Savenko, Vladimir Sakson, Gleb Savinov, Alexander Samokhvalov, Alexander Semionov, Arseny Semionov, Yuri Shablikin, Boris Shamanov, Alexander Shmidt, Nadezhda Shteinmiller, Elena Skuin, Galina Smirnova, Alexander Sokolov, Alexander Stolbov, Victor Teterin, Nikolai Timkov, Mikhail Tkachev, Leonid Tkachenko, Mikhail Trufanov, Yuri Tulin, Ivan Varichev, Anatoli Vasiliev, Valery Vatenin, Nina Veselova, Rostislav Vovkushevsky, Vecheslav Zagonek, Sergei Zakharov, Ruben Zakharian, and other important Leningrad artists.
- 1961 (Leningrad): Exhibition of works by Leningrad artists of 1961, with Piotr Alberti, Evgenia Antipova, Taisia Afonina, Vsevolod Bazhenov, Irina Baldina, Nikolai Baskakov, Yuri Belov, Piotr Belousov, Piotr Buchkin, Zlata Bizova, Nikolai Galakhov, Elena Gorokhova, Abram Grushko, Alexei Eriomin, Mikhail Kaneev, Mikhail Kozell, Engels Kozlov, Marina Kozlovskaya, Maya Kopitseva, Boris Korneev, Elena Kostenko, Anna Kostrova, Gevork Kotiantz, Yaroslav Krestovsky, Valeria Larina, Boris Lavrenko, Ivan Lavsky, Oleg Lomakin, Dmitry Maevsky, Gavriil Malish, Nikita Medovikov, Evsey Moiseenko, Alexei Mozhaev, Nikolai Mukho, Vera Nazina, Mikhail Natarevich, Anatoli Nenartovich, Samuil Nevelshtein, Yuri Neprintsev, Dmitry Oboznenko, Sergei Osipov, Vladimir Ovchinnikov, Nikolai Pozdneev, Alexander Pushnin, Galina Rumiantseva, Lev Russov, Maria Rudnitskaya, Ivan Savenko, Gleb Savinov, Vladimir Sakson, Alexander Samokhvalov, Vladimir Seleznev, Arseny Semionov, Alexander Semionov, Yuri Shablikin, Boris Shamanov, Alexander Shmidt, Nadezhda Shteinmiller, Elena Skuin, Galina Smirnova, Alexander Sokolov, Alexander Stolbov, Victor Teterin, Nikolai Timkov, Leonid Tkachenko, Mikhail Trufanov, Yuri Tulin, Ivan Varichev, Anatoli Vasiliev, Piotr Vasiliev, Valery Vatenin, Lazar Yazgur, Vecheslav Zagonek, Sergei Zakharov, Maria Zubreeva, and other important Leningrad artists.
- 1964 (Leningrad): The Leningrad Fine Arts Exhibition, with Piotr Alberti, Evgenia Antipova, Taisia Afonina, Irina Baldina, Nikolai Baskakov, Evgenia Baykova, Vsevolod Bazhenov, Yuri Belov, Piotr Belousov, Piotr Buchkin, Zlata Bizova, Vladimir Chekalov, Sergei Frolov, Nikolai Galakhov, Vasily Golubev, Tatiana Gorb, Abram Grushko, Alexei Eriomin, Mikhail Kaneev, Yuri Khukhrov, Mikhail Kozell, Marina Kozlovskaya, Tatiana Kopnina, Maya Kopitseva, Boris Korneev, Alexander Koroviakov, Elena Kostenko, Nikolai Kostrov, Anna Kostrova, Gevork Kotiantz, Yaroslav Krestovsky, Valeria Larina, Boris Lavrenko, Ivan Lavsky, Piotr Litvinsky, Oleg Lomakin, Dmitry Maevsky, Gavriil Malish, Evsey Moiseenko, Nikolai Mukho, Piotr Nazarov, Vera Nazina, Mikhail Natarevich, Anatoli Nenartovich, Yuri Neprintsev, Dmitry Oboznenko, Sergei Osipov, Vladimir Ovchinnikov, Nikolai Pozdneev, Alexander Pushnin, Galina Rumiantseva, Ivan Savenko, Gleb Savinov, Vladimir Sakson, Alexander Samokhvalov, Vladimir Seleznev, Arseny Semionov, Alexander Semionov, Yuri Shablikin, Boris Shamanov, Alexander Shmidt, Nadezhda Shteinmiller, Elena Skuin, Galina Smirnova, Alexander Sokolov, Ivan Sorokin, Victor Teterin, Nikolai Timkov, Mikhail Tkachev, Mikhail Trufanov, Yuri Tulin, Vitaly Tulenev, Ivan Varichev, Anatoli Vasiliev, Piotr Vasiliev, Valery Vatenin, Lazar Yazgur, Vecheslav Zagonek, Sergei Zakharov, Ruben Zakharian, and other important Leningrad artists.
- 1965 (Leningrad): The Spring Exhibition of works by Leningrad artists of 1965, with Piotr Alberti, Evgenia Antipova, Taisia Afonina, Vsevolod Bazhenov, Yuri Belov, Vladimir Gavrilov, Irina Getmanskaya, Vasily Golubev, Irina Dobrekova, Maya Kopitseva, Alexander Koroviakov, Mikhail Kozell, Engels Kozlov, Elena Kostenko, Gevork Kotiantz, Vladimir Krantz, Valeria Larina, Boris Lavrenko, Ivan Lavsky, Oleg Lomakin, Dmitry Maevsky, Gavriil Malish, Valentina Monakhova, Nikolai Mukho, Vera Nazina, Mikhail Natarevich, Anatoli Nenartovich, Dmitry Oboznenko, Sergei Osipov, Lev Orekhov, Victor Otiev, Nikolai Pozdneev, Maria Rudnitskaya, Ivan Savenko, Vladimir Sakson, Alexander Semionov, Arseny Semionov, Boris Shamanov, Alexander Shmidt, Nadezhda Shteinmiller, Elena Skuin, Alexander Stolbov, Victor Teterin, Nikolai Timkov, Yuri Tulin, Vitaly Tulenev, Ivan Varichev, Anatoli Vasiliev, Igor Veselkin, Rostislav Vovkushevsky, Lazar Yazgur, Vecheslav Zagonek, Ruben Zakharian, and other important Leningrad artists.
- 1968 (Leningrad): The Fall Exhibition of works by Leningrad artists of 1968, with Piotr Alberti, Vsevolod Bazhenov, Sergei Frolov, Nikolai Galakhov, Tatiana Gorb, Vladimir Gorb, Mikhail Kaneev, Mikhail Kozell, Engels Kozlov, Elena Kostenko, Nikolai Kostrov, Anna Kostrova, Gevork Kotiantz, Vladimir Krantz, Ivan Lavsky, Dmitry Maevsky, Gavriil Malish, Nikolai Mukho, Mikhail Natarevich, Sergei Osipov, Vladimir Ovchinnikov, Lev Orekhov, Victor Otiev, Maria Rudnitskaya, Ivan Savenko, Vladimir Sakson, Alexander Semionov, Arseny Semionov, Boris Shamanov, Alexander Shmidt, Elena Skuin, Alexander Stolbov, German Tatarinov, Mikhail Trufanov, Yuri Tulin, Ivan Varichev, Anatoli Vasiliev, Rostislav Vovkushevsky, Lazar Yazgur, Vecheslav Zagonek, Sergei Zakharov, Ruben Zakharian, and other important Leningrad artists.
- 1972 (Leningrad): Our Contemporary The Second Exhibition of works by Leningrad artists of 1972, with Irina Baldina, Nikolai Baskakov, Piotr Belousov, Nikolai Galakhov, Irina Getmanskaya, Tatiana Gorb, Irina Dobrekova, Alexei Eriomin, Engels Kozlov, Maya Kopitseva, Boris Korneev, Elena Kostenko, Nikolai Kostrov, Anna Kostrova, Gevork Kotiantz, Boris Lavrenko, Oleg Lomakin, Dmitry Maevsky, Vera Nazina, Samuil Nevelshtein, Dmitry Oboznenko, Sergei Osipov, Kapitolina Rumiantseva, Ivan Savenko, Vladimir Sakson, Arseny Semionov, Alexander Shmidt, Nikolai Timkov, Anatoli Vasiliev, Vecheslav Zagonek, and other important Leningrad artists.
- 1972 (Leningrad): Across the Motherland Exhibition of Leningrad artists dedicated to 50th Anniversary of USSR, with Evgenia Antipova, Nikolai Baskakov, Olga Bogaevskaya, Sergei Frolov, Nikolai Galakhov, Vasily Golubev, Tatiana Gorb, Vladimir Gorb, Irina Dobrekova, Mikhail Kaneev, Mikhail Kozell, Marina Kozlovskaya, Engels Kozlov, Maya Kopitseva, Boris Korneev, Elena Kostenko, Nikolai Kostrov, Anna Kostrova, Gevork Kotiantz, Yaroslav Krestovsky, Ivan Lavsky, Oleg Lomakin, Dmitry Maevsky, Gavriil Malish, Evsey Moiseenko, Piotr Nazarov, Samuil Nevelshtein, Dmitry Oboznenko, Sergei Osipov, Nikolai Pozdneev, Ivan Savenko, Gleb Savinov, Vladimir Sakson, Arseny Semionov, Alexander Sokolov, German Tatarinov, Victor Teterin, Nikolai Timkov, Mikhail Trufanov, Yuri Tulin, Vitaly Tulenev, Ivan Varichev, Igor Veselkin, Valery Vatenin, Vecheslav Zagonek, and other important Leningrad artists.
- 1975 (Leningrad): Our Contemporary regional exhibition of Leningrad artists of 1975, with Evgenia Antipova, Taisia Afonina, Vsevolod Bazhenov, Irina Baldina, Nikolai Baskakov, Piotr Belousov, Veniamin Borisov, Zlata Bizova, Nikolai Galakhov, Vasily Golubev, Elena Gorokhova, Abram Grushko, Irina Dobrekova, Alexei Eriomin, Mikhail Kaneev, Yuri Khukhrov, Mikhail Kozell, Marina Kozlovskaya, Engels Kozlov, Maya Kopitseva, Boris Korneev, Elena Kostenko, Nikolai Kostrov, Anna Kostrova, Gevork Kotiantz, Vladimir Krantz, Yaroslav Krestovsky, Boris Lavrenko, Oleg Lomakin, Dmitry Maevsky, Gavriil Malish, Evsey Moiseenko, Piotr Nazarov, Vera Nazina, Mikhail Natarevich, Yuri Neprintsev, Samuil Nevelshtein, Dmitry Oboznenko, Sergei Osipov, Vladimir Ovchinnikov, Nikolai Pozdneev, Alexander Pushnin, Galina Rumiantseva, Kapitolina Rumiantseva, Ivan Savenko, Gleb Savinov, Vladimir Sakson, Alexander Samokhvalov, Arseny Semionov, Alexander Semionov, Yuri Shablikin, Boris Shamanov, Alexander Shmidt, Nadezhda Shteinmiller, Elena Skuin, Galina Smirnova, Alexander Stolbov, Victor Teterin, Nikolai Timkov, Leonid Tkachenko, Mikhail Trufanov, Yuri Tulin, Vitaly Tulenev, Ivan Varichev, Anatoli Vasiliev, Igor Veselkin, Valery Vatenin, Lazar Yazgur, Vecheslav Zagonek, and other important Leningrad artists.
- 1976 (Moscow): The Fine Arts of Leningrad, with Mikhail Avilov, Evgenia Antipova, Nathan Altman, Irina Baldina, Nikolai Baskakov, Yuri Belov, Piotr Belousov, Isaak Brodsky, Piotr Buchkin, Rudolf Frentz, Nikolai Galakhov, Vasily Golubev, Abram Grushko, Alexei Eriomin, Mikhail Kaneev, Engels Kozlov, Marina Kozlovskaya, Maya Kopitseva, Boris Korneev, Elena Kostenko, Nikolai Kostrov, Anna Kostrova, Gevork Kotiantz, Boris Lavrenko, Oleg Lomakin, Alexander Lubimov, Dmitry Maevsky, Gavriil Malish, Evsey Moiseenko, Mikhail Natarevich, Vera Nazina, Yuri Neprintsev, Samuil Nevelshtein, Dmitry Oboznenko, Sergei Osipov, Vladimir Ovchinnikov, Nikolai Pozdneev, Alexander Pushnin, Victor Oreshnikov, Ivan Savenko, Vladimir Sakson, Gleb Savinov, Alexander Samokhvalov, Vladimir Seleznev, Alexander Semionov, Arseny Semionov, Boris Shamanov, Nadezhda Shteinmiller, Elena Skuin, Galina Smirnova, Alexander Sokolov, Victor Teterin, Nikolai Timkov, Mikhail Trufanov, Yuri Tulin, Ivan Varichev, Anatoli Vasiliev, Valery Vatenin, Nina Veselova, Vecheslav Zagonek, Sergei Zakharov, and other important Leningrad artists.
- 1978 (Leningrad): The Fall Exhibition of works by Leningrad artists of 1978, with Piotr Alberti, Taisia Afonina, Genrikh Bagrov, Irina Baldina, Nikolai Baskakov, Evgenia Baykova, Vsevolod Bazhenov, Piotr Belousov, Veniamin Borisov, Zlata Bizova, Evgeny Chuprun, Sergei Frolov, Nikolai Galakhov, Vladimir Gorb, Irina Dobrekova, Alexei Eriomin, Mikhail Kaneev, Yuri Khukhrov, Maya Kopitseva, Elena Kostenko, Nikolai Kostrov, Anna Kostrova, Gevork Kotiantz, Mikhail Kozell, Marina Kozlovskaya, Vladimir Krantz, Dmitry Maevsky, Gavriil Malish, Nikolai Mukho, Vera Nazina, Alexander Naumov, Dmitry Oboznenko, Victor Otiev, Evgeny Pozdniakov, Alexander Semionov, Yuri Shablikin, Boris Shamanov, Alexander Stolbov, Alexander Tatarenko, German Tatarinov, Nikolai Timkov, Leonid Tkachenko, Yuri Tulin, Vitaly Tulenev, Ivan Varichev, Anatoli Vasiliev, Ruben Zakharian, and other important Leningrad artists.
- 1994 (Saint Petersburg): Paintings of 1950-1980s by the Leningrad School's artists, with Piotr Alberti, Taisia Afonina, Vsevolod Bazhenov, Piotr Buchkin, Irina Baldina, Veniamin Borisov, Yuri Belov, Piotr Belousov, Vladimir Chekalov, Evgeny Chuprun, Nikolai Galakhov, Irina Dobrekova, Alexei Eriomin, Mikhail Kaneev, Yuri Khukhrov, Mikhail Kozell, Maya Kopitseva, Marina Kozlovskaya, Boris Korneev, Alexander Koroviakov, Elena Kostenko, Piotr Litvinsky, Boris Lavrenko, Dmitry Maevsky, Alexei Mozhaev, Valentina Monakhova, Mikhail Natarevich, Alexander Naumov, Anatoli Nenartovich, Yuri Neprintsev, Samuil Nevelshtein, Dmitry Oboznenko, Lev Orekhov, Sergei Osipov, Vladimir Ovchinnikov, Victor Otiev, Nikolai Pozdneev, Evgeny Pozdniakov, Lev Russov, Galina Rumiantseva, Kapitolina Rumiantseva, Alexander Samokhvalov, Alexander Semionov, Nadezhda Shteinmiller, German Tatarinov, Nikolai Timkov, Mikhail Tkachev, Leonid Tkachenko, Anatoli Vasiliev, Piotr Vasiliev, Rostislav Vovkushevsky, Lazar Yazgur, Vecheslav Zagonek, and other important Leningrad artists.
- 1994 (Saint Petersburg): Etudes done from nature in creativity of the Leningrad School's artists, with Piotr Alberti, Taisia Afonina, Evgenia Antipova, Vsevolod Bazhenov, Irina Baldina, Veniamin Borisov, Zlata Bizova, Vladimir Chekalov, Evgeny Chuprun, Nikolai Galakhov, Tatiana Gorb, Abram Grushko, Irina Dobrekova, Alexei Eriomin, Mikhail Kaneev, Yuri Khukhrov, Mikhail Kozell, Maya Kopitseva, Marina Kozlovskaya, Boris Korneev, Alexander Koroviakov, Elena Kostenko, Piotr Litvinsky, Boris Lavrenko, Ivan Lavsky, Dmitry Maevsky, Alexei Mozhaev, Valentina Monakhova, Nikolai Mukho, Mikhail Natarevich, Alexander Naumov, Anatoli Nenartovich, Dmitry Oboznenko, Lev Orekhov, Sergei Osipov, Vladimir Ovchinnikov, Victor Otiev, Nikolai Pozdneev, Evgeny Pozdniakov, Galina Rumiantseva, Kapitolina Rumiantseva, Lev Russov, Alexander Samokhvalov, Alexander Semionov, Nadezhda Shteinmiller, German Tatarinov, Nikolai Timkov, Mikhail Tkachev, Leonid Tkachenko, Anatoli Vasiliev, Igor Veselkin, Lazar Yazgur, Vecheslav Zagonek, Ruben Zakharian, and other important Leningrad artists.
- 1994 (Pont-Audemer): Dessins, Gravures, Sculptures et Tableaux du XX siecle du fonds de L' Union des Artistes de Saint-Petersbourg, with Abram Grushko, Vasily Golubev, Elena Kostenko, Maya Kopitseva, Gevork Kotiantz, Marina Kozlovskaya, Valeria Larina, Boris Lavrenko, Valentina Monakhova, Mikhail Natarevich, Ivan Savenko, Vladimir Sakson, Arseny Semionov, Alexander Shmidt, Elena Skuin, Nikolai Timkov, Yuri Tulin, Vitaly Tulenev, Ivan Varichev, Igor Veselkin, and other important Leningrad artists.
- 1995 (Saint Petersburg): Lyrical motives in the works of artists of the war generation, with Piotr Alberti, Taisia Afonina, Evgenia Antipova, Vsevolod Bazhenov, Irina Baldina, Veniamin Borisov, Yuri Belov, Piotr Belousov, Piotr Buchkin, Vladimir Chekalov, Evgeny Chuprun, Sergei Frolov, Nikolai Galakhov, Abram Grushko, Mikhail Kaneev, Yuri Khukhrov, Mikhail Kozell, Maya Kopitseva, Marina Kozlovskaya, Boris Korneev, Alexander Koroviakov, Elena Kostenko, Ivan Lavsky, Dmitry Maevsky, Gavriil Malish, Nikolai Mukho, Mikhail Natarevich, Anatoli Nenartovich, Yuri Neprintsev, Samuil Nevelshtein, Lev Orekhov, Sergei Osipov, Vladimir Ovchinnikov, Victor Otiev, Nikolai Pozdneev, Evgeny Pozdniakov, Lev Russov, Galina Rumiantseva, Kapitolina Rumiantseva, Alexander Samokhvalov, Alexander Semionov, Alexander Shmidt, Nadezhda Shteinmiller, Alexander Sokolov, Alexander Tatarenko, German Tatarinov, Victor Teterin, Nikolai Timkov, Mikhail Tkachev, Leonid Tkachenko, Anatoli Vasiliev, Piotr Vasiliev, Igor Veselkin, Rostislav Vovkushevsky, Maria Zubreeva, and other important Leningrad artists.

== Bibliography ==
- The Spring Exhibition of works by Leningrad artists of 1953. Catalogue. – Leningrad: Leningrad Union of Soviet Artists, 1953. - p. 6,26.
- The Spring Exhibition of works by Leningrad artists of 1954. Catalogue. – Leningrad: Izogiz, 1954. - p. 12.
- The Fall Exhibition of works by Leningrad artists of 1956. Catalogue. – Leningrad: Leningrad artist, 1958. - p. 14.
- The Fall Exhibition of works by Leningrad artists of 1958. Catalogue. -Leningrad: Khudozhnik RSFSR, 1959. - p. 6.
- Exhibition of works by Leningrad artists of 1960. Exhibition catalogue. – Leningrad: Khudozhnik RSFSR, 1963. - p. 12.
- Exhibition of works by Leningrad artists of 1960. Exhibition catalogue. – Leningrad: Khudozhnik RSFSR, 1961. - p. 22.
- Exhibition of works by Leningrad artists of 1961. Exhibition catalogue. – Leningrad: Khudozhnik RSFSR, 1964. - p. 22.
- The Leningrad Fine Arts Exhibition. - Leningrad: Khudozhnik RSFSR, 1965. - p. 27.
- The Fall Exhibition of works by Leningrad artists of 1968. Catalogue. – Leningrad: Khudozhnik RSFSR, 1971. - p. 9.
- The Spring Exhibition of works by Leningrad artists of 1971. Catalogue. - Leningrad: Khudozhnik RSFSR, 1972. - p. 10.
- Exhibition of works by Leningrad artists dedicated to the 25th Anniversary of the Victory in Great Patriotic war. Catalogue. – Leningrad: Khudozhnik RSFSR, 1972. - p. 7.
- Our Contemporary Exhibition catalogue of works by Leningrad artists of 1971. - Leningrad: Khudozhnik RSFSR, 1972. - p. 13.
- Our Contemporary The Second Exhibition of works by Leningrad artists of 1972. Catalogue. -Leningrad: Khudozhnik RSFSR, 1973. - p. 9.
- Our Contemporary The Third Exhibition of works by Leningrad artists of 1973. Catalogue. -Leningrad: Khudozhnik RSFSR, 1974. - p. 7.
- Exhibitions of Soviet art. Directory. Volume 4. 1948–1953. – Moscow: Soviet Artist, 1973.
- Across the Motherland Exhibition of Leningrad artists. Catalogue. - Leningrad: Khudozhnik RSFSR, 1974. - p. 15.
- Our Contemporary regional exhibition of Leningrad artists of 1975. Catalogue. - Leningrad: Khudozhnik RSFSR, 1980. - p. 17.
- The Fine Arts of Leningrad. Exhibition catalogue. – Leningrad: Khudozhnik RSFSR, 1976. - p. 20.
- The Portrait of Contemporary the Fifth Exhibition of works by Leningrad artists of 1976. Catalogue. – Leningrad: Khudozhnik RSFSR, 1983. - p. 12.
- Exhibition of works by Leningrad artists dedicated to the 60th Anniversary of October Revolution. Catalogue. – Leningrad: Khudozhnik RSFSR, 1982. - p. 15.
- The Fall Exhibition of works by Leningrad artists of 1978. Catalogue. - Leningrad: Khudozhnik RSFSR, 1983. - p. 10.
- Directory of Members of the Union of Artists of USSR. Volume 1. – Moscow: Soviet artist, 1979. - p. 547.
- Regional Exhibition of works by Leningrad artists of 1980. Exhibition catalogue. - Leningrad: Khudozhnik RSFSR, 1983. - p. 15.
- Elena Mikhailovna Kostenko. Exhibition catalogue. – Leningrad: Khudozhnik RSFSR, 1986.
- L' École de Leningrad. Catalogue. – Paris: Drouot Richelieu, 16 June 1989. - p. 48-49.
- L' École de Leningrad. Catalogue. – Paris: Drouot Richelieu, 27 November 1989. - p. 28.
- L' École de Leningrad. Catalogue. – Paris: Drouot Richelieu, 12 Mars 1990. - p. 46-47.
- L' École de Leningrad. Catalogue. – Paris: Drouot Richelieu, 11 June 1990. - p. 26-27.
- L' École de Leningrad. Catalogue. - Paris: Drouot Richelieu, 21 December 1990. - p. 16-17.
- Painture Russe. Catalogue. – Paris: Drouot Richelieu, 18 February 1991. - p. 33-34.
- Painture Russe. Catalogue. - Paris: Drouot Richelieu, 26 April 1991. - p. 8-9.
- Leningrad figuration. Catalogue. - Paris: Drouot Richelieu, 10 June 1991. - p. 10-11.
- Saint-Pétersbourg – Pont-Audemer. Dessins, Gravures, Sculptures et Tableaux du XX siècle du fonds de L' Union des Artistes de Saint-Pétersbourg. – Pont-Audemer: 1994. - p. 71.
- The Leningrad Artists. Paintings of 1950-1980s. Exhibition catalogue. – Saint Petersburg: Saint Petersburg Union of artists, 1994. - p. 4.
- Lyrical motives in the works of artists of the war generation. Painting, drawings. Exhibition catalogue. – Saint Petersburg: Nikolai Nekrasov Memorial museum, 1995. - p. 4.
- Matthew C. Bown. Dictionary of 20th Century Russian and Soviet Painters 1900-1980s. - London: Izomar, 1998. ISBN 0-9532061-0-6, ISBN 978-0-9532061-0-0.
- Link of Times: 1932–1997. Artists – Members of Saint – Petersburg Union of Artists of Russia. Exhibition catalogue. – Saint – Petersburg: Manezh Central Exhibition Hall, 1997. - p. 289.
- Vern G. Swanson. Soviet Impressionism. – Woodbridge, England: Antique Collectors' Club, 2001. - p. 40,44.
- Sergei V. Ivanov. Unknown Socialist Realism. The Leningrad School.- Saint Petersburg: NP-Print Edition, 2007. – p. 9, 15, 362, 389–402, 404–407. ISBN 5-901724-21-6, ISBN 978-5-901724-21-7.
- Anniversary Directory graduates of Saint Petersburg State Academic Institute of Painting, Sculpture, and Architecture named after Ilya Repin, Russian Academy of Arts. 1915–2005. - Saint Petersburg: Pervotsvet Publishing House, 2007.- p. 68. ISBN 978-5-903677-01-6.
