= Viktor Oreshnikov =

Soviet Russian painter

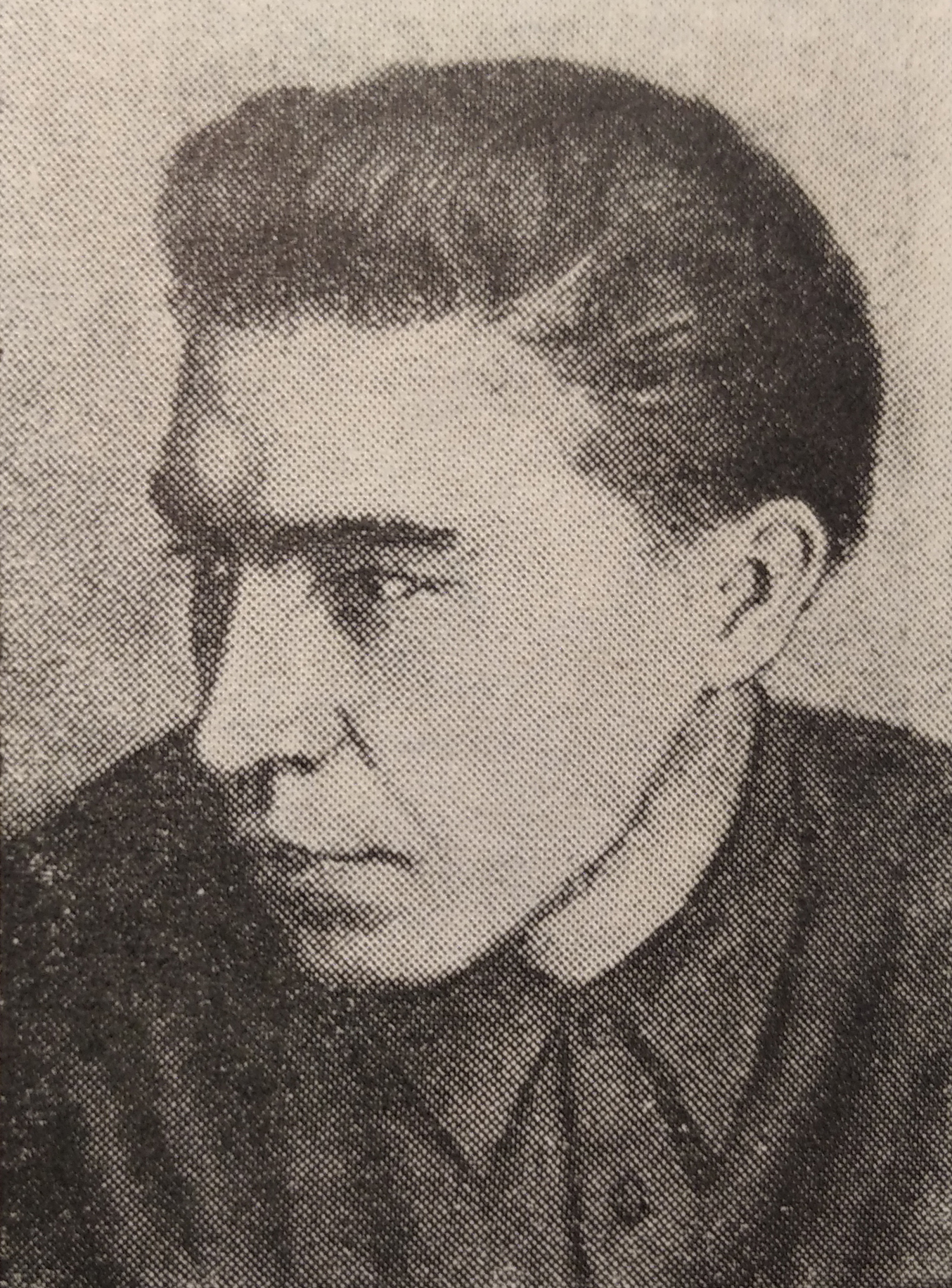
- Born: Viktor Mikhailovich Oreshnikov; 20 January 1904; Perm, Russian Empire
- Died: 15 March 1987 (aged 83); Leningrad, RSFSR, Soviet Union
- Education: Repin Institute of Arts
- Known for: Painting
- Movement: Socialist realism
- Awards: Stalin Prize; Order of Lenin

Viktor Mikhailovich Oreshnikov (Russian: Виктор Михайлович Орешников; 20 January 1904, Perm – 15 March 1987, Leningrad) was a Soviet and Russian painter, People's Painter of the USSR, active member of the Soviet Academy of Arts (1954–1987), Stalin Prize winner, rector of Repin Institute of Arts (1953–1978).

== Biography ==
In 1927 he graduated from the Leningrad VHUTEIN in workshop of Kuzma Petrov-Vodkin. In 1930-1987 he taught in the Repin Institute of Arts. PhD in Art History (1937). Doctor of Fine Arts (1948).

== Awards and honors ==
- Two Stalin Prizes, 3rd class (1948, 1950)
- People's Painter of the RSFSR (1956)
- Order of the Red Banner of Labour (1957)
- Order of the Badge of Honour (1961)
- People's Painter of the USSR (1969)
- Order of Lenin (1974)
- Order of Friendship of Peoples (1984)
- Jubilee Medal "In Commemoration of the 100th Anniversary of the Birth of Vladimir Ilyich Lenin"
- Medal "For Valiant Labour in the Great Patriotic War 1941–1945"
- Medal "In Commemoration of the 250th Anniversary of Leningrad"
- Medal "Veteran of Labour"

== Pupils ==
- Irina Getmanskaya
- Boris Korneev
- Alexander Koroviakov
- Elena Kostenko
- Victor Otiev
- Nikolai Pozdneev
- Maria Rudnitskaya
- Aleksandr Sokolov
- Rostislav Vovkushevsky

== Sources ==
- Выставка произведений ленинградских художников. 1947 год. Живопись. Скульптура. Графика. Театрально-декорационная живопись. Каталог. Л., ЛССХ, 1948.
- Бойков В. Изобразительное искусство Ленинграда. Заметки о выставке ленинградских художников. // Ленинградская правда, 1947, 29 ноября.
- Аникушин М. О времени и о себе. // Вечерний Ленинград, 1967, 17 октября.
- Изобразительное искусство Ленинграда. Каталог выставки. — Л: Художник РСФСР, 1976. — с.25,40.
- Выставка произведений ленинградских художников, посвященная 60-летию Великого Октября. — Л: Художник РСФСР, 1982. — с.18.
- Виктор Михайлович Орешников. Каталог выставки. Живопись. М: Изобразительное искусство, 1985.
- L' École de Leningrad. Auction Catalogue. - Paris: Drouot Richelieu, 12 Mars 1990. - p. 100-101.
- L' École de Leningrad. Auction Catalogue. - Paris: Drouot Richelieu, 11 Juin 1990. - p. 60-61.
- Sergei V. Ivanov. Unknown Socialist Realism. The Leningrad School. Saint Petersburg: NP-Print Edition, 2007. P.9, 15, 19, 356, 358, 359, 362, 367–371, 383–385, 387–392, 396, 398, 399, 402, 406, 441, 443, 444. ISBN 5-901724-21-6, ISBN 978-5-901724-21-7.
