= List of painters of Saint Petersburg Union of Artists =

This is a list of painters of Saint Petersburg Union of Artists (founded 2 August 1932 as the Leningrad Union of Soviet Artists, since 1959 named as the Leningrad branch of Union of Artists of Russian Federation. Acquired its current name after the renaming of Leningrad in Saint Petersburg in 1991). This list represents the Soviet era and contemporary Russian painters from Leningrad/Saint Petersburg. The basis for inclusion in this List can serve as the membership of the painter at the Saint Petersburg Union of Artists, confirmed by authoritative sources.

== Alphabetical list ==
=== A ===
Portrait	Person
	Taisia Afonina (1913–1994); Soviet Union; Russian Federation portrait, genre, and still life painter
	Piotr Alberti (1913–1994); Russian Empire; Soviet Union; Russian Federation portrait, genre, and still life painter
	Evgenia Antipova (1917–2009); Soviet Union; Russian Federation portrait, genre, and still life painter

=== B ===
Portrait	Person			
	Isaak Brodsky (1884–1939); Russian Empire; Soviet Union portrait, genre, and landscape painter (portrait by Ilya Repin, 1913)	Lenin in Smolniy in 1917, 1930	Stalin, 1928	Lenin in front of Smolny, 1925
	Irina Baldina (1922–2009); Soviet Union; Russian Federation portrait, genre, and landscape painter			
	Nikolai Baskakov (1918–1993); Soviet Union; Russian Federation portrait, genre, and landscape painter			
	Evgenia Baykova (1907–1997); Russian Empire; Soviet Union; Russian Federation genre, landscape, and still life painter			
	Vsevolod Bazhenov (1908–1986); Russian Empire; Soviet Union landscape and seascape painter			
	Piotr Belousov (1912–1988); Russian Empire; Soviet Union painter and graphic artist			
	Zlata Bizova (1927–2013); Soviet Union landscape and genre painter			
	Veniamin Borisov (1935–2014); Soviet Union; Russian Federation genre, landscape, and still life painter			
	Boris F. Borzin (1923–1991); Soviet Union; Russian Federation genre, landscape, and still life painter	oil on canvas		
	Piotr Buchkin (1886–1965); Russian Empire; Soviet Union portrait painter, graphic artist, book illustrator			

=== C ===
Portrait	Person
	Vladimir Chekalov (1922–1992); Soviet Union; Russian Federation portrait, landscape, genre and battle paintings
	Evgeny Chuprun (1927–2005); Soviet Union; Russian Federation seascape, landscape, and genre painter

=== E ===
Portrait	Person
	Alexei Eriomin (1918–1998); Soviet Union; Russian Federation landscape and genre painter

=== F ===
Portrait	Person			
	Pavel Filonov (1883–1941); Russian Empire; Soviet Union avant-garde painter (self-portrait)	Masters of Analytical Art, 1935	Animals, 1930	Portrait of E.Glebova, 1915

=== G ===
Portrait	Person
	Nikolai Galakhov (1928–2022); Soviet Union; Russian Federation landscape painter
	Irina Getmanskaya (born 1939); Soviet Union; Russian Federation portrait painter
	Ivan Godlevsky (1908–1998); Soviet Union; Russian Federation landscape painter
	Vasily Golubev (1925–1985); Soviet Union landscape painter
	Tatiana Gorb (1935–2013); Soviet Union; Russian Federation portrait painter, graphic artist
	Vladimir Gorb (1903–1988); Russian Empire; Soviet Union portrait painter
	Elena Gorokhova (1933–2014); Soviet Union; Russian Federation symbolist painter

=== K ===
Portrait	Person
	Mikhail Kaneev (1923–1983); Soviet Union cityscape and landscape painter
	Georgy Kovenchuk (1933–2015); Soviet Union; Russian Federation cityscape, still life, and landscape painter
	Yuri Khukhrov (1932–2003); Soviet Union; Russian Federation portrait, cityscape and landscape painter
	Maya Kopitseva (1924–2005); Soviet Union; Russian Federation genre and everyday painter
	Boris Korneev (1922–1974); Soviet Union portrat, genre, and landscape painter
	Alexander Koroviakov (1912–1993); Russian Empire; Soviet Union; Russian Federation cityscape, still life, and landscape painter
	Elena Kostenko (1926–2019); Soviet Union; Russian Federation portraits, genre and still life painting
	Nikolai Kostrov (1901–1995); Russian Empire; Soviet Union; Russian Federation painter and graphic artist
	Gevork Kotiantz (1906–1996); Russian Empire; Soviet Union; Russian Federation still life and portrait painter
	Mikhail Kozell (1911–1993); Russian Empire; Soviet Union; Russian Federation landscape painter
	Engels Kozlov (1926–2007); Soviet Union; Russian Federation genre, portrait, and still life painter
	Marina Kozlovskaya (1925–2019); Soviet Union; Russian Federation portrait and landscape painter

=== L ===
Portrait	Person
	Piotr Litvinsky (1927–2009); Soviet Union; Russian Federation realist painter

=== M ===
Portrait	Person			
	Dmitry Maevsky (1917–1992); Russian Empire; Soviet Union; Russian Federation landscape and portrait painter			
	Casimir Malevich (1878–1935); Russian Empire; Soviet Union suprematist avante-garde painter	Self-portrait, 1908	Flowergirl, 1903	Portrait of woman, 1930
	Valentina Monakhova (born 1932); Soviet Union; Russian Federation genre, landscape, and portrait painter			
	Nikolai Mukho (1913–1986); Russian Empire; Soviet Union landscape and genre painter			

=== N ===
Portrait	Person
	Mikhail Natarevich (1907–1979); Russian Empire; Soviet Union genre and history painter
	Alexander Naumov (1935–2010); Soviet Union; Russian Federation genre and landscape painter
	Anatoli Nenartovich (1915–1988); Russian Empire; Soviet Union genre, cityscape, and still life painter
	Samuil Nevelshtein (1903–1983); Russian Empire; Soviet Union portrait and landscape painter and graphic artist

=== O ===
Portrait	Person	
	Dmitry Oboznenko (1930–2002); Soviet Union; Russian Federation genre and battle painting, landscape	
	Lev Orekhov (1913–1992); Russian Empire; Soviet Union; Russian Federation landscape and still life painter	
	Sergei Osipov (1915–1985); Russian Empire; Soviet Union landscape and still life painter	Cornflowers, 1976
	Vladimir Ovchinnikov (1911–1978); Russian Empire; Soviet Union landscape and genre painter	

=== P ===
Portrait	Person			
	Kuzma Petrov-Vodkin (1878–1939); Russian Empire; Soviet Union symbolist painter	Bathing of a Red Horse, 1912	On the Line of Fire, 1916	Petrograd Madonna, 1918
	Nikolai Pozdneev (1930–1978); Soviet Union portrait, genre, and still life painter			
	Evgeny Pozdniakov (1923–1991); Soviet Union landscape painter			
	Alexander Pushnin (1921–1991); Soviet Union portrait and history painter			

=== R ===
Portrait	Person
	Maria Rudnitskaya (1916–1983); Russian Empire; Soviet Union portrait, genre, and still life painter
	Galina Rumiantseva (1927–2004); Soviet Union; Russian Federation portrait, genre, and still life painter
	Kapitolina Rumiantseva (1925–2002); Soviet Union; Russian Federation still life painter
	Lev Russov (1926–1987); Soviet Union portrait, genre, and still life painter

=== S ===
Portrait	Person
	Alexander Samokhvalov (1894–1971); Russian Empire; Soviet Union easel and monumental painter, graphic artist, book illustrator
	Gleb Savinov (1915–2000); Russian Empire; Soviet Union; Russian Federation genre, portrait, and landscape painter
	Alexander Semionov (1922–1984); Soviet Union cityscape and landscape painter
	Arseny Semionov (1911–1992); Soviet Union; Russian Federation portrait, genre, landscape, cityscape, and still life painter (self-portrait, 1962)
	Yuri Shablikin (born 1932); Soviet Union; Russian Federation landscape and still life painter
	Boris Shamanov (1931–2009); Soviet Union; Russian Federation portrait, landscape, and still life painter
	Nadezhda Shteinmiller (1915–1991); Russian Empire; Soviet Union painter, graphic and theater artist
	Elena Skuin (1908–1986); Russian Empire; Soviet Union genre, landscape, and still life painter
	Galina Smirnova (1929–2015); Soviet Union; Russian Federation genre and portrait painter
	Alexander Sokolov (1918–1973); Soviet Union genre and portrait painter
	Alexander Stolbov (born 1929); Soviet Union; Russian Federation portrait and landscape painting

=== T ===
Portrait	Person
	Alexander Tatarenko (1925–2000); Soviet Union genre, cityscape, and landscape painter
	German Tatarinov (1925–2006); Soviet Union; Russian Federation landscape painter
	Victor Teterin (1922–1991); Soviet Union genre, still life, and landscape painter
	Nikolai Timkov (1912–1993); Russian Empire; Soviet Union; Russian Federation landscape painter
	Leonid Tkachenko (1927–2020); Soviet Union; Russian Federation realist and conceptual painter
	Mikhail Trufanov (1921–1988); Soviet Union genre and portrait painter
	Vitaly Tulenev (1937–1998); Soviet Union; Russian Federation genre, portrait, and landscape painter

=== V ===
Portrait	Person
	Anatoli Vasiliev (1917–1994); Russian Empire; Soviet Union; Russian Federation genre, history, and landscape painter
	Piotr Vasiliev (1909–1989); Russian Empire; Soviet Union genre painting, landscape, still life
	Nina Veselova (1922–1960); Soviet Union genre and history painting, portrait, still life
	Rostislav Vovkushevsky (1917–2000); Russian Empire; Soviet Union; Russian Federation genre, portrait, and still life painter

=== Z ===
Portrait	Person
	Sergei Zakharov (1900–1993); Russian Empire; Soviet Union; Russian Federation painter, graphic artist, designer

== See also ==
- List of Russian artists
- Saint Petersburg Union of Artists
- Russian culture
- List of 20th-century Russian painters
- 1957 in Fine Arts of the Soviet Union

== Sources ==
- Artists of peoples of the USSR. Biography Dictionary. Volume 1. – Moscow: Iskusstvo, 1970.
- Artists of peoples of the USSR. Biography Dictionary. Volume 2. – Moscow: Iskusstvo, 1972.
- Fine Arts of the Leningrad. Exhibition Catalogue. – Leningrad: Khudozhnik RSFSR, 1976.
- Directory of Members of Union of Artists of USSR. Volume 1,2. – Moscow: Soviet Artist Edition, 1979.
- Directory of Members of the Leningrad branch of the Union of Artists of Russian Federation. – Leningrad: Khudozhnik RSFSR, 1980.
- Artists of peoples of the USSR. Biography Dictionary. Volume 4 Book 1. – Moscow: Iskusstvo, 1983.
- Directory of Members of the Leningrad branch of the Union of Artists of Russian Federation. – Leningrad: Khudozhnik RSFSR, 1987.
- Artists of peoples of the USSR. Biography Dictionary. Volume 4 Book 2. – Saint Petersburg: Academic project humanitarian agency, 1995.
- Link of Times: 1932 – 1997. Artists – Members of Saint Petersburg Union of Artists of Russia. Exhibition catalogue. – Saint Petersburg: Manezh Central Exhibition Hall, 1997.
- Matthew C. Bown. Dictionary of 20th Century Russian and Soviet Painters 1900-1980s. – London: Izomar 1998.
- Vern G. Swanson. Soviet Impressionism. – Woodbridge, England: Antique Collectors' Club, 2001.
- Sergei V. Ivanov. Unknown Socialist Realism. The Leningrad School. – Saint-Petersburg: NP-Print Edition, 2007. – ISBN 5-901724-21-6, ISBN 978-5-901724-21-7.
- Anniversary Directory graduates of Saint Petersburg State Academic Institute of Painting, Sculpture, and Architecture named after Ilya Repin, Russian Academy of Arts. 1915 – 2005. – Saint Petersburg: Pervotsvet Publishing House, 2007.
- Igor N. Pishny. The Leningrad School of painting. Socialist realism of 1930-1980s: Selected names. – Saint Petersburg: Kolomenskaya versta, 2008. – ISBN 978-5-91555-005-5.
