= Alexander Stolbov =

Russian painter

- Александр Столбов
- Born: 5 June 1929 (age 97); Vyatka, Russian SFSR, Soviet Union
- Education: Repin Institute of Arts
- Known for: Painting; art teaching
- Movement: Realism

Alexander Sergeevich Stolbov (Russian: Александр Сергеевич Столбов; born 5 June 1929) is a Soviet Russian painter and art teacher, living and working in Saint Petersburg (former Leningrad). He is a member of the Saint Petersburg Union of Artists (before 1992 named as the Leningrad branch of the Union of Artists of Russian Federation), regarded as one of representatives of the Leningrad school of painting, most known for his portraits.

== Biography ==
Alexander Sergeevich Stolbov was born on 5 June 1929 in Vyatka city, USSR.

In 1933 Alexander Stolbov with his mother came to Leningrad. In 1939-1941 he studied in children's art studio. In 1945, after returning from evacuation he entered at the Leningrad Secondary Art School (now the Art Lyceum named after Boris Ioganson), where he studied of Natalya Podkovirina, Vasily Sokolov, Mikhail Kozell.

In 1952 Alexander Stolbov entered at the first course of Department of Painting at the Leningrad Institute of Painting, Sculpture and Architecture named after Ilya Repin, where he studied of Vasily Sokolov, Valery Pimenov, Vitaly Valtsev, Boris Lavrenko, and Boris Kharchenko.

In 1958, Alexander Stolbov graduated from the Leningrad Institute of Painting, Sculpture and Architecture named after Ilya Repin in Josef Serebrany studio. His graduation work was genre painting "Output from the enemy encirclement."

Since 1959 Alexander Stolbov has participated in Art Exhibitions. He painted portraits, genre scenes, landscapes, and still lifes. In the 1960-1970s he has created a series of portraits of Leningrad artists, including Oleg Pochteny, Elena Gorokhova, Arseny Semionov, Vladimir Andreev, and his wife sculptor Kira Suvorova.

Since 1961, Alexander Stolbov is a member of the Saint Petersburg Union of Artists (before 1992 named as the Leningrad branch of the Union of Artists of Russian Federation). Since 1966 he taught in the Higher School of Art and Industry named after Vera Mukhina.

In the years 1960-1980 Alexander Stolbov makes creative trips to Armenia, Central Asia, Zaonezhie, works at the House of Artistic Creation in Hot Key village and especially in the ancient Pskov town, which was reflected in his paintings. His personal exhibitions were in Leningrad (1982) and in Pskov in (1988).

Paintings by Alexander Stolbov reside in art museums and private collections in Russia, France, England, and throughout the world.

== See also ==
- Leningrad School of Painting
- List of painters of Saint Petersburg Union of Artists
- List of the Russian Landscape painters
- Saint Petersburg Union of Artists

== Sources ==
- Directory of Members of the Union of Artists of USSR. Volume 2.- Moscow: Soviet artist, 1979. - p. 391.
- Matthew C. Bown. Dictionary of 20th Century Russian and Soviet Painters 1900-1980s. - London: Izomar, 1998. ISBN 0-9532061-0-6, ISBN 978-0-9532061-0-0.
- Sergei V. Ivanov. Unknown Socialist Realism. The Leningrad School.- Saint Petersburg: NP-Print Edition, 2007. – pp. 370, 393–398, 399, 401, 403, 406, 443–445. ISBN 5-901724-21-6, ISBN 978-5-901724-21-7.
- Anniversary Directory graduates of Saint Petersburg State Academic Institute of Painting, Sculpture, and Architecture named after Ilya Repin, Russian Academy of Arts. 1915 - 2005. - Saint Petersburg: Pervotsvet Publishing House, 2007.- p. 82. ISBN 978-5-903677-01-6.
