= Irina Getmanskaya =

Russian painter (born 1939)

Irina Ivanovna Getmanskaya
- Born: 6 January 1939 (age 87); Leningrad, Russian SFSR, Soviet Union
- Education: Repin Institute of Arts
- Known for: Painting
- Movement: Realism

Irina Ivanovna Getmanskaya (Russian: Ири́на Ива́новна Ге́тманская; born 6 January 1939) is a Russian painter and art teacher, living and working in Saint Petersburg. She is a member of the Saint Petersburg Union of Artists (before 1992 named as the Leningrad branch of Union of Artists of Russian Federation), regarded as a representative of the Leningrad school of painting.

== Biography ==
Getmanskaya (born Sysoeva) was born on 6 January 1939, in Leningrad, USSR, to an artistic family. From 1950 to 1957 she studied in the Leningrad Secondary Art School under the All-Union Academy of Arts. She was a student of Alexei Kuznetsov and Alexander Bulygin.

In 1959 she entered the Department of Painting of the Leningrad Institute of Painting, Sculpture and Architecture named after Ilya Repin. She studied with Alexander Debler, Boris Ugarov, Viktor Reykhet, Vitaly Valtsev, and Vladislav Anisovich.

In 1964 she graduated from Ilya Repin Institute at the Victor Oreshnikov studio. Her graduation work was the painting "A Portrait of Sculpture", dedicated to the memory of her father, who died in the blockade of Leningrad.

Irina Getmanskaya has participated in Art Exhibitions Since 1965. She painted portraits, landscapes, genre compositions, worked as painter of the Leningrad department of Art Found of Russian Federation.

Between 1960 and 1970 Irina Getmanskaya traveled often to the Ural region, Murmansk and Kandalaksha, Krasnoyarsk and Middle Asia. She worked also at the Houses of artistic creation "Acedemicheskaya Dacha" (Tver region), and "Hot Key" (North Caucasus).

Irina Getmanskaya is most famous for her contemporary portraits. Her style developed from the naturalist painting of 1960 in the direction of more decorative color and generalized composition while maintaining a constructive style of drawing.

Irina Getmanskaya is a Member of Saint Petersburg Union of Artists (before 1992 Leningrad branch of Union of Artists of Russian Federation) since 1975.

In 1967-1975 Getmanskaya taught at the Leningrad Higher School of Industrial Art named after Vera Mukhina. Paintings by Irina Getmanskaya reside in Art museums and private collections in Russia, France, Germany, in the U.S., England and other countries.

== Bibliography ==
- Matthew C. Bown. Dictionary of 20th Century Russian and Soviet Painters 1900-1980s. - London: Izomar, 1998. ISBN 0-9532061-0-6, ISBN 978-0-9532061-0-0.
- Sergei V. Ivanov. Unknown Socialist Realism. The Leningrad School. - Saint Petersburg: NP-Print Edition, 2007. – pp. 183, 359, 395, 396. ISBN 5-901724-21-6, ISBN 978-5-901724-21-7.

== Video ==
- Children and Youth in Painting of 1930-1980s. The Leningrad School. Part 2
