= Maria Rudnitskaya =

Russian artist (1916–1983)

Maria Leonidovna Rudnitskaya
- Born: June 17, 1916; Ekaterinoslav, Ukraine, Russian Empire
- Died: January 1, 1983 (aged 66); Leningrad, USSR
- Education: Repin Institute of Arts
- Known for: Painting, Graphics, Art Education
- Movement: Realism Socialist realism

Maria Leonidovna Rudnitskaya (Russian: Мари́я Леони́довна Рудни́цкая; June 17, 1916 – January 1, 1983) was a Russian Soviet realist painter, graphic artist, and art teacher, who lived and worked in Leningrad. She was a member of the Leningrad Union of Artists, regarded as one of representatives of the Leningrad school of painting.

== Biography ==
Maria Leonidovna Rudnitskaya was born June 17, 1916, in the city of Ekaterinoslav, Ukraine, Russian Empire, in family of railway engineers. In the years 1916 to 1927, Maria, alongside her parents, lived in Siberia for the construction of the Trans-Siberian Railway.

In 1932, after graduating, Maria Rudnitskaya came to Leningrad. In 1935, Maria Rudnitskaya entered the Tavricheskaya Art School, where she studied with A. Gromov, S. Bootler, V. Levitsky, V. Oreshnikov, and M. Aslamazian.

In 1939, Maria Rudnitskaya graduated from Tavricheskaya Art School. In the same year, she entered the Department of Painting of the Leningrad Institute of Painting, Sculpture and Architecture, where she studied with Semion Abugov, Boris Fogel, Mikhail Bernshtein, and Igor Grabar.

In 1949, after a long break due to World War II, Maria Rudnitskaya graduated from the Leningrad Institute of Painting, Sculpture and Architecture after Ilya Repin in the studio of Victor Oreshnikov, together with Nikolai Babasuk, Rostislav Vovkushevsky, Ivan Godlevsky, Valery Pimenov, Victor Teterin, and other young artists. Her graduation work was a genre painting named "Motherhood".

Since 1949, Maria Rudnitskaya participated in Art Exhibitions. She painted portraits, landscapes, still lives, genre paintings, and sketches done from nature. Maria Rudnitskaya tended to plein-air painting. She has successfully worked in the genre of children's portraits. Her portraits consist of inherent characteristics of precision, delicacy of tonal colouring, which matches her plein-air style. Upon his return to Leningrad, she taught first in the Secondary Art School, and later at the Department of General Painting of the Higher School of Industrial Art named after Vera Mukhina. Maria Rudnitskaya was a member of the Leningrad Union of Artists since 1949.

Maria Leonidovna Rudnitskaya died on January 1, 1983, in Leningrad at the sixty-seventh year of life. Her paintings reside in museums and private collections in England, France, Italy, in the U.S., Russia, and others.

== Bibliography ==
- Directory of Members of the Union of Artists of USSR. Volume 2.- Moscow: Soviet artist, 1979. - p. 287.
- Sergei V. Ivanov. Unknown Socialist Realism. The Leningrad School. - Saint Petersburg: NP-Print Edition, 2007. – pp. 135, 368, 388, 392-396, 407, 413, 415-417, 424. ISBN 5-901724-21-6, ISBN 978-5-901724-21-7.
- Anniversary Directory graduates of Saint Petersburg State Academic Institute of Painting, Sculpture, and Architecture named after Ilya Repin, Russian Academy of Arts. 1915 - 2005. - Saint Petersburg: Pervotsvet Publishing House, 2007. p. 61.
