= Aleksandr Sokolov (painter, born 1918) =

Russian painter

Alexander Sokolov
- Александр Соколов
- Born: 1 December 1918; Aleshki, Voronezh Province, Soviet Russia
- Died: 9 May 1973 (aged 54); Leningrad, Russian SFSR, Soviet Union
- Education: Repin Institute of Arts
- Known for: Painting; art teaching
- Movement: Realism
- Awards: Honored Artist of the RSFSR

Alexander Ivanovich Sokolov (Russian: Александр Иванович Соколов; 1 December 1918 – 9 May 1973) was a Soviet Russian painter and Art teacher, Honored Artist of the RSFSR, lived and worked in Leningrad, a member of the Leningrad branch of Union of Artists of Russian Federation, regarded as one of the representatives of the Leningrad school of painting, most famous for his genre painting.

== Biography ==
Alexander Ivanovich Sokolov was born 1 December 1918, in Aleshki village, Voronezh Province of Soviet Russia. He was a veteran of World War II, participated in the defense of the Leningrad and he had many military orders.

In 1950, Alexander Sokolov graduated from Ilya Repin Institute in Victor Oreshnikov workshop. He studied of Veniamin Belkin, Mikhail Bernshtein, Pavel Naumov, Andrei Mylnikov.

After graduation, his work was presented in Art Exhibitions. He painted portraits, genre scenes, landscapes, and sketches from the life. He was a member of the Leningrad Union of Artists since 1950. Master of Art-criticism (1954), an Honored Artist of the Russian Federation (1970).

Alexander Ivanovich Sokolov died on 9 May 1973, in Leningrad. His paintings reside in the State Russian Museum, in Art museums, and in private collections in Russia, France, England, United States, and other countries.

== Bibliography ==
- The Leningrad Fine Arts Exhibition. - Leningrad: Khudozhnik RSFSR, 1965. - p. 51.
- Directory of members of the Leningrad branch of Union of Artists of Russian Federation. - Leningrad: Khudozhnik RSFSR, 1972. - p. 51.
- Matthew C. Bown. Dictionary of 20th Century Russian and Soviet Painters 1900-1980s. - London: Izomar, 1998. ISBN 0-9532061-0-6, ISBN 978-0-9532061-0-0.
- Sergei V. Ivanov. Unknown Socialist Realism. The Leningrad School. - Saint Petersburg: NP-Print Edition, 2007. – pp. 9, 19, 20, 24, 370, 372, 388, 393-395, 397, 399. ISBN 5-901724-21-6, ISBN 978-5-901724-21-7.
- Anniversary Directory graduates of Saint Petersburg State Academic Institute of Painting, Sculpture, and Architecture named after Ilya Repin, Russian Academy of Arts. 1915 - 2005. - Saint Petersburg: Pervotsvet Publishing House, 2007.- p. 63. ISBN 978-5-903677-01-6.
