= Rostislav Vovkushevsky =

Russian painter

Rostislav Ivanovich Vovkushevsky
- Born: 22 March 1917; Polotsk, Vitebsk Governorate, Russian Empire
- Died: 14 August 2000 (aged 83); Saint Petersburg, Russian Federation
- Education: Repin Institute of Arts
- Known for: Painting
- Movement: Realism
- Awards: Order of Red Star

Rostislav Ivanovich Vovkushevsky (Russian: Ростисла́в Ива́нович Вовкуше́вский; 22 March 1917 – 14 August 2000) was a Russian Soviet realist painter, who lived and worked in Leningrad. He was a member of the Saint Petersburg Union of Artists (before 1992 named as the Leningrad branch of Union of Artists of Russian Federation), and regarded as one of representatives of the Leningrad school of painting.

== Biography ==
Rostislav Ivanovich Vovkushevsky was born on 22 March 1917 in the city of Polotsk, Vitebsk Province, Belorussia, Russian Empire in family of railway engineer.

In 1925 his family comes to Leningrad. In 1936 after graduation high school Rostislav Vovkushevsky entered at the Department of Architecture of the Leningrad Institute of Painting, Sculpture and Architecture, where he studied of noted art educators Pavel Shillingovsky, Ivan Bilibin, Konstantin Rudakov, and Leonid Ovsannikov.

In February 1942, together with the institute, he was evacuated from besieged Leningrad to Central Asia in Samarkand. In June 1942, Rostislav Vovkushevsky was drafted into the Red Army and took part in the Second World War, which led the Soviet people against Nazi Germany and its allies. As gunner he fought on the Volkhov Front and 2nd Belorussian Front, took part in the liberation of the Nazi occupation of Poland and Baltik Republics. He was wounded and received military awards: Order of the Red Star, Medal for Combat Service, Medal "For the Defence of Leningrad", Medal "For the Victory over Germany in the Great Patriotic War 1941–1945", and others.

After demobilization Rostislav Vovkushevsky returned to his studies and in 1949 graduated from the Leningrad Institute of Painting, Sculpture and Architecture named after Ilya Repin in Victor Oreshnikov studio, together with Ivan Godlevsky, Maria Rudnitskaya, Valery Pimenov, Nikolai Babasuk, Victor Teterin and other young artists. His graduated work was monumental painting named "Climbers".

Rostislav Vovkushevsky has participated in art exhibitions since 1949. He painted portraits, landscapes, still lifes, genre scenes, worked as easel and monumental painter. His personal exhibition was in Saint Petersburg in 1995. Most famous for his decorative paintings of still lifes and portraits.

His individual style evolved under the strong impression of dating as far back as the 1930s, with the works of French artists Claude Monet, Pierre Bonnard, André Derain, love to which he retained for life. Painting of Rostislav Vovkushevsky bright and decorative. He uses pure color and half-tones, almost without having to mix paints.

In 1949–1959 years Rostislav Vovkushevsky taught painting and drawing at the Leningrad Higher School of Industrial Art named after Vera Mukhina.

Since 1949, Rostislav Vovkushevsky was a member of the Leningrad Union of Artists (since 1992, named as Saint Petersburg Union of Artists).

Rostislav Ivanovich Vovkushevsky died on 14 August 2000 in Saint Petersburg. His paintings reside in art museums and private collections in Russia, Japan, England, Germany, Italy, in the U.S., France and others.

== See also ==
- Fine Art of Leningrad
- Leningrad School of Painting
- List of Russian artists
- List of 20th-century Russian painters
- List of painters of Saint Petersburg Union of Artists
- Saint Petersburg Union of Artists

== Bibliography ==
- Artists of the peoples of the USSR. Biography and Bibliography Dictionary. Vol. 2. Moscow, Iskusstvo Edition, 1972. P.308–309.
- Directory of members of the Leningrad branch of Union of Artists of Russian Federation. Leningrad, Khudozhnik RSFSR, 1987. P.25.
- L' École de Leningrad. Auction Catalogue. Paris, Drouot Richelieu. 1989, 27 Novembre. P.66.
- L' École de Leningrad. Auction Catalogue. Paris, Drouot Richelieu. 1990, 12 Mars. P.98-99.
- L' École de Leningrad. Auction Catalogue. Paris, Drouot Richelieu. 1990, 11 Juin. P.156-157.
- A Parisian from Leningrad. Rostislav Vovkushevsky. Saint Petersburg, Costa Edition, 2007.
- Sergei V. Ivanov. Unknown Socialist Realism. The Leningrad School. Saint Petersburg, NP-Print Edition, 2007. P.9, 18, 26, 29, 231, 240, 298, 359, 388–396, 402–406, 413–417, 421-423, 446. ISBN 5-901724-21-6, ISBN 978-5-901724-21-7.
- Anniversary Directory graduates of Saint Petersburg State Academic Institute of Painting, Sculpture, and Architecture named after Ilya Repin, Russian Academy of Arts. 1915 – 2005. Saint Petersburg: Pervotsvet Publishing House, 2007. P.60. ISBN 978-5-903677-01-6.
