= Saint Petersburg Repin Academy of Fine Arts =

Art academy in Russia

- Санкт-Петербургская академия художеств имени Ильи Репина
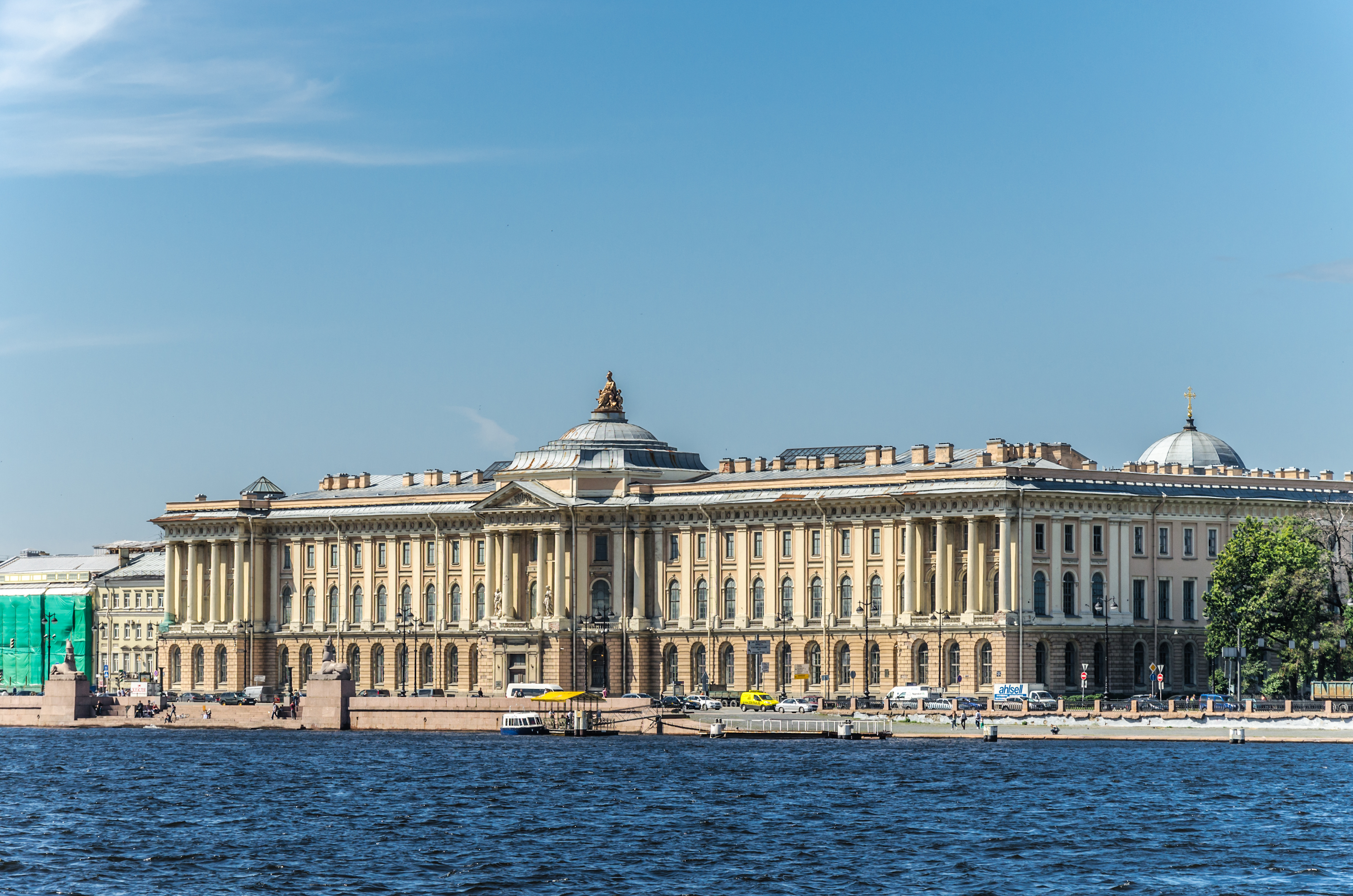
- Former names: Repin Institute of Painting, Sculpture and Architecture
- Type: Art school
- Established: 1932
- Location: 17 Universitetskaya Embankment str., Saint Petersburg, Russia; 59°56′16″N 30°17′23″E
- Website: artsacademy.ru

Saint Petersburg Repin Academy of Fine Arts (Russian: Санкт-Петербургская академия художеств имени Ильи Репина) is an art academy in Saint Petersburg, Russia.

== History ==
The academy traces its history to the Imperial Academy of Arts. After the October Revolution, the academy actually stopped working and was abolished by a decree of the RSFSR government on April 12, 1918; after a series of transformations in the building of the Academy of Arts, the Institute of Painting, Sculpture and Architecture was established in 1932 (the modern St. Petersburg Academy of Arts named after Ilya Repin).

On March 14, 1917, the Commissioner of the Provisional Government for the institutions of the former Ministry of the Imperial Court, Fyodor Aleksandrovich Golovin, notified the meeting of members of the academy and the Council of Professors of the Higher Art School that he was leading. Princess Maria Pavlovna, as a person belonging to the dynasty, cannot be the president of the Academy of Arts, but "under the new system, the useful activities of the Academy will continue." Instead of Imperial, it began to be called Petersburg. At the end of April, the commissioner of the Provisional Government, architect Alexander Tamanian, became vice-president of the academy (with the rights of president), and by the summer, a commission elected by the academy prepared a project for its reform. It was planned to divide the Academy of Arts into three parts: the academy itself (in the status of a scientific and artistic institution), the Higher Art School and provincial art schools. According to the project, the School's classes were eliminated, and instead, main (major) and auxiliary workshops were introduced. The main workshops were to be led by professor-supervisors and were designed for a training period of 3 to 5 years. The auxiliary courses were intended to cover a number of artistic subjects and art history. However, neither by the beginning of the academic year, nor in the first months after the October Revolution, the reform of the academy took a practical course.

On April 12, 1918, by decree of the Council of People's Commissars, the Academy of Arts was abolished, the funds of the academic museum were to be transferred to the Russian Museum, the Higher Art School at the academy was subject to reorganization; On October 10, 1918, the opening of the reformed School took place, which received the name Petrograd State Free Art and Educational Workshops (PGSKHUM).

In 1921, they were renamed the Petrograd State Art and Educational Workshops at the recreated Academy of Arts. In 1922, they were transformed into the Higher Art and Technical Institute (VKHUTEIN, LVKhTI). In 1930, VKHUTEIN was reorganized into the Institute of Proletarian Fine Arts (INPII). The Faculty of Architecture was abolished, its students were transferred to the Leningrad Institute of Municipal Construction Engineers (LIICS, formerly the Institute of Civil Engineers). In 1932, INPII was transformed into the Leningrad Institute of Painting, Sculpture and Architecture, which in 1944 was named after Ilya Efimovich Repin. It retained the name until the 1990s, when it was transformed into the St. Petersburg Repin State Academic Institute of Painting, Sculpture and Architecture. In 2020 was renamed in St Petersburg Repin Academy of Fine Arts.
