= Regional Art exhibition (Leningrad, 1980) =

1980 Soviet art exhibition

Regional Art Exhibition. Leningrad, 1980. Catalog
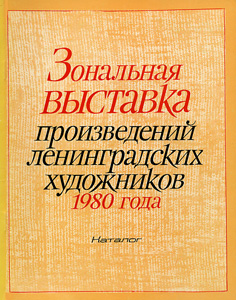
- Year: 1980
- Location: Manezh Central Exhibition Hall, Leningrad

The Regional Art Exhibition of 1980 (Russian: Зональная выставка произведений ленинградских художников 1980 года) became one of the most important and largest Soviet Art exhibition of the end of 1970s. The exhibition took place in the Manezh Central Exhibition Hall, which was handed over to Leningrad artists three years before.

== History and organization ==
The Regional Art Exhibition "Our Contemporary" opened on September 10, and continued till November 9, 1980. The organization and preparation of the exhibition was handled by an Exhibition Committee which consisted of 55 the most authoritative art-experts. It published a Catalog of the exhibition. The exhibition displayed works of art of painters, sculptors, graphics, masters of arts and crafts, as well as of artists of theater and cinema.

== Contributing artists ==
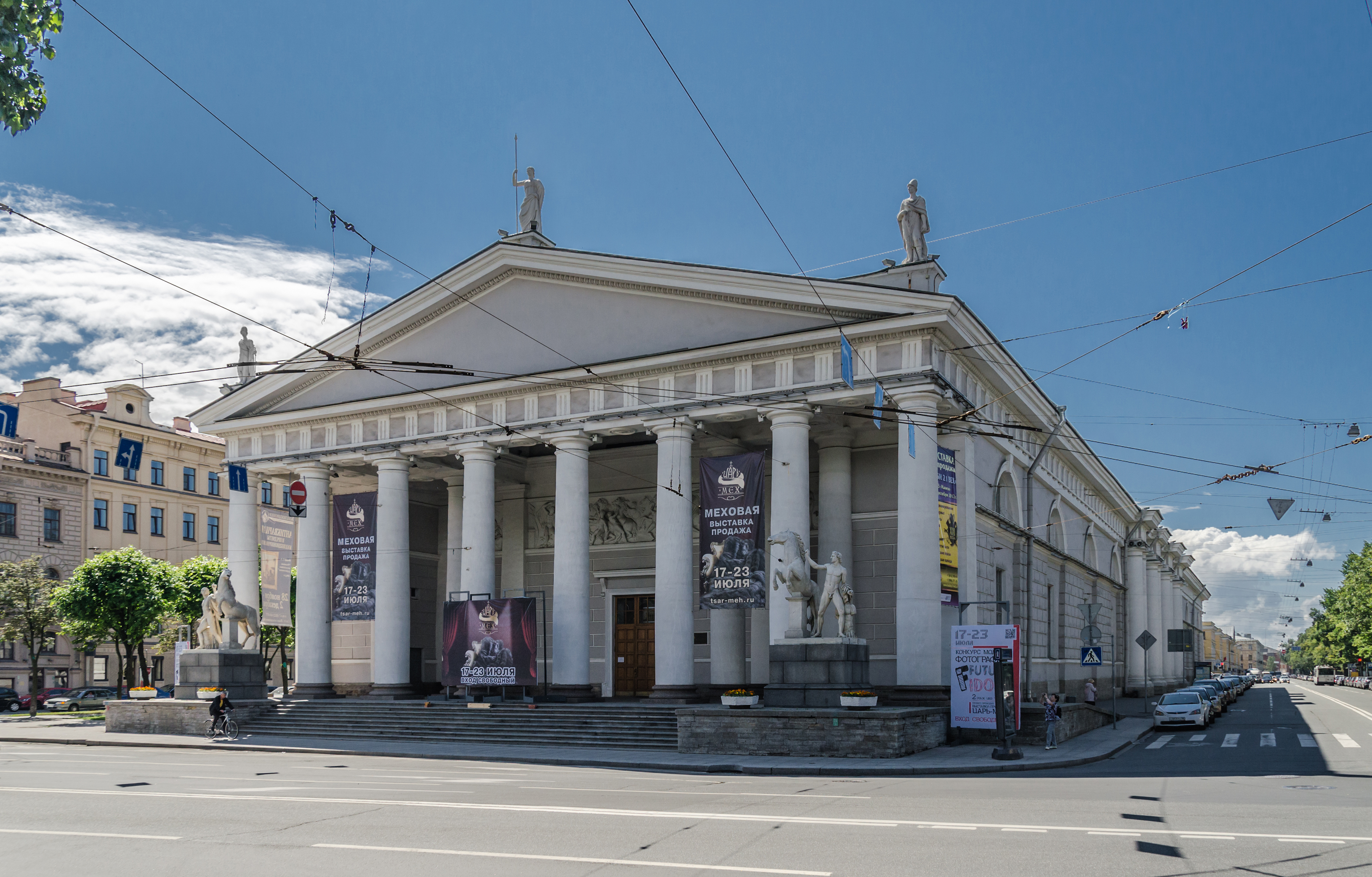
Manege Central Exhibition Hall (Saint Petersburg)

In the largest Department of Painting were exhibited art works of 329 authors. There were Evgenia Antipova, Taisia Afonina, Leonid Baykov, Vsevolod Bazhenov, Irina Baldina, Nikolai Baskakov, Piotr Belousov, Dmitry Belyaev, Zlata Bizova, Olga Bogaevskaya, Lev Bogomolets, Veniamin Borisov, Boris F Borzin, Dmitry Buchkin, Lev Chegorovsky, Evgeny Chuprun, Nikolai Galakhov, Ivan Godlevsky, Vasily Golubev, Elena Gorokhova, Abram Grushko, Irina Dobrekova, Oleg Eremeev, Alexei Eriomin, Mikhail Kaneev, Yuri Khukhrov, Maya Kopitseva, Boris Korneev, Victor Korovin, Elena Kostenko, Nikolai Kostrov, Anna Kostrova, Gevork Kotiantz, Mikhail Kozell, Marina Kozlovskaya, Engels Kozlov, Vladimir Krantz, Yaroslav Krestovsky, Valeria Larina, Boris Lavrenko, Anatoli Levitin, Oleg Lomakin, Vladimir Malevsky, Gavriil Malish, Eugene Maltsev, Boris Maluev, Yuri Mezhirov, Evsey Moiseenko, Nikolai Mukho, Andrei Mylnikov, Vera Nazina, Anatoli Nenartovich, Yuri Neprintsev, Samuil Nevelshtein, Dmitry Oboznenko, Victor Oreshnikov, Sergei Osipov, Lia Ostrova, Victor Otiev, Vladimir Ovchinnikov, Vyacheslav Ovchinnikov, Filaret Pakun, Yuri Pavlov, Varlen Pen, Boris Petrov, Stepan Privedentsev, Alexander Pushnin, Valentina Rakhina, Semion Rotnitsky, Galina Rumiantseva, Kapitolina Rumiantseva, Lev Russov, Vladimir Sakson, Ivan Savenko, Gleb Savinov, Vladimir Seleznev, Arseny Semionov, Yuri Shablikin, Boris Shamanov, Alexander Shmidt, Nadezhda Shteinmiller, Elena Skuin, Kim Slavin, Galina Smirnova, Alexander Stolbov, Victor Teterin, Nikolai Timkov, Leonid Tkachenko, Mikhail Trufanov, Yuri Tulin, Vitaly Tulenev, Boris Ugarov, Ivan Varichev, Anatoli Vasiliev, Valery Vatenin, Igor Veselkin, Lazar Yazgur, German Yegoshin, Vecheslav Zagonek, Ruben Zakharian, and others most prominent painters of the Leningrad School.

Art works of 141 sculptors were exhibited in the Department of Sculptures. Department of graphics presented creations of 164 artists.

== Contributed artworks ==
Art works created in years 1979–1980 were selected for the exhibition, with only some earlier works. All of the selections were being exhibited for the first time. Some of them were subsequently found in the collections of leading Soviet Art museums, as well as domestic and foreign galleries and collectors.

Historical genre was represented by the works of "From the diary of Leningrad Siege", "Nobody is forgotten" by Piotr Belousov, "The rank and file of the October Revolution" by Dmitry Buchkin, "Northern Society" by Lev Chegorovsky, "A War Comes", "Our sister" by Alexei Eriomin, "Appeal" by Engels Kozlov, "On the Kulikovo Field" by Boris Lavrenko, "In the midnight" by Anatoli Levitin, "Lenin among the workers" by Oleg Lomakin, "Dashing time" by Eugene Maltsev, "Returning" by Yuri Mezhirov, "A Song" by Evsey Moiseenko, "June 22, 1941" by Dmitry Oboznenko, "On the Volga River during the Civil War" by Gleb Savinov, "The day before. The Nevsky Prospekt" by Vladimir Seleznev, "Peoples of the Malaya Zemlya" by Mikhail Trufanov, "The Revival" by Boris Ugarov, and some others.

Portrait genre was represented by the works of "Portrait of the writer Nikolai Tikhonov" by Taisia Afonina, "Portrait of Spirova, a mother of Natasha Kuchevskaya, a hero of Stalingrad" by Irina Baldina, "Portrait of welder" by Nikolai Baskakov, "Father and son", "Stableman Mikhail Repin", "Working-class family" by Dmitry Belyaev, "Portrait of woman artist" by Oleg Eremeev, "Portrait of veteran" by Elena Kostenko, "Portrait of composer Chisteliov" by Engels Kozlov, "Portrait of theater artist Stepanov" by Valeria Larina, "Portrait of Bochkin, notable builder" by Anatoli Levitin, "A Collective portrait of Physicians" by Oleg Lomakin, "Portrait of film and theatre actor Kirill Lavrov" by Yuri Mezhirov, "Portrait of the wife" by Evsey Moiseenko, "Alonushka", "Nurse", "Alexei" by Samuil Nevelshtein, "Portrait of Tanya Gorelova" by Dmitry Oboznenko, "Portrait of Sergei Chystiakov", "Portrait of actress Ludmila Chursina" by Victor Oreshnikov, "Ira" by Victor Otiev, "Selfportrait" by Yuri Pavlov, "Portrait of Dmitry Likhachov", "Portrait of stoker" by Varlen Pen, "Portrait of professor Voronkov", "Portrait of engineer Rumiantsev", "Portrait of Vasilkovsky, Professor of Architecture" by Semion Rotnitsky, "Architect Semionov" by Lev Russov, "Sergei Yesenin" by Igor Veselkin, and some others.

Genre painting was represented by the works of "Metal" by Nikolai Baskakov, "Children's Holiday", "Play Checkers" by Olga Bogaevskaya, "Spring day at the little station" by Zlata Bizova, "In the area of new buildings" by Veniamin Borisov, "In the Ocean" by Evgeny Chuprun, "Summer harvest time" by Vasily Golubev, "Debut" by Elena Gorokhova, "Working Saturday" by Abram Grushko, "In the dock of Illichivsk port" by Irina Dobrekova, "Nevsky Prospekt" by Mikhail Kaneev, "Subjugated Samotlor" by Yuri Khukhrov, "Summer construction" by Maya Kopitseva, "Spring in Leningrad" by Marina Kozlovskaya, "Russian women" by Boris Lavrenko, "Saturday in the Cheryomushki district of Sayan", "Evening in the Cheryomushki district of Sayan" by Anatoli Levitin, "Cyclists", "Regatta" by Vladimir Malevsky, "In memory of the fallen" by Eugene Maltsev, "Oilmen of Surgut" by Boris Maluev, "August", "A Memory" by Evsey Moiseenko, "Bullfighting", "Death of Garcia Lorca" by Andrei Mylnikov, "Happy time" by Vera Nazina, "Bed" by Dmitry Oboznenko, "October", "July Sun (A Young Family)" by Lia Ostrova, "Subbotnik at the Kirov Plant", "Kanonersky Ship repair works" by Vladimir Ovchinnikov, "Sunday evening" by Vyacheslav Ovchinnikov, "Sleeping girl", "Poets" by Yuri Pavlov, "In the Leningrad Sea Port" by Stepan Privedentsev, "Artists on plein air" by Galina Rumiantseva, "Leningrad Symphony. Conductor Yevgeny Mravinsky" by Lev Russov, "Magistral" by Ivan Savenko, "Panpipes" by Boris Shamanov, "A Meeting of friends" by Galina Smirnova, "Plans for the future" by Yuri Tulin, "She is Ignites birch trees", "Autumn fire" by Vitaly Tulenev, "Concert of ancient chamber music" by German Yegoshin, "Childhood", "Falling Leaves" by Vecheslav Zagonek, and some others.

Landscape and Cityscape was represented by the works of "At midday. On the native land of artist Alexey Venetsianov" by Leonid Baykov, "A March" by Vsevolod Bazhenov, "Ladoga Lake", "Lake Onega", "Neva River. Oreshek Fortress" by Lev Bogomolets, "Northern Islands", "Autumn in the White Sea" by Nikolai Galakhov, "White night on the Neva River", "Pushkin House" by Ivan Godlevsky, "At the northern edge", "Light-Blue expanse" by Vasily Golubev, "Evening on the Onega River" by Abram Grushko, "Autumn song" by Alexei Eriomin, "At the Palace Square in Leningrad", "At the Kazan Cathedral in Leningrad" by Mikhail Kaneev, "Spring day", "In Pavlovsk", "In the Park of Pavlovsk", "Rainy day" by Victor Korovin, "A March", "Early spring" by Mikhail Kozell, "Evening on the lake" by Vladimir Krantz, "Thunderstorm", "Rostov the Great. Lake Nero", "Disturbing the white night" by Yaroslav Krestovsky, "The Land" by Gavriil Malish, "Tavrichesky Garden" by Evsey Moiseenko, "Turned green" by Nikolai Mukho, "The Leningrad. A View from the window", "Northern river", "Truvor hillfort" by Sergei Osipov, "White night" by Vladimir Ovchinnikov, "Evening" by Filaret Pakun, "A Lilac on the Vladimirskaya Square", "The Kikin Hall. Cyclamens" by Valentina Rakhina, "The Sacrament of the mountain night" by Boris Petrov, "After the rain" by Kapitolina Rumiantseva, "Small Lake. Triptych" by Vladimir Sakson, "A Light-Blue Dauria", "Russian Field" by Ivan Savenko, "Pristannoe village", "Spring in the city" by Gleb Savinov, "The Leningrad. Yellow houses", "A Bridge over the Fontanka River", "Solianoy side street" by Arseny Semionov, "Kimry", "Bridge over Shozhma River", "Early spring" by Yuri Shablikin, "Morning on the river. Rosehip" by Boris Shamanov, "Apple trees in bloom" by Elena Skuin, "Edge favorite", "Cranes fly away" by Kim Slavin, "Spring has come" by German Tatarinov, "Plowland" by Alexander Stolbov, "Torzhok in winter", "Winter morning", "Summer evening" by Nikolai Timkov, "Spring road" by Vitaly Tulenev, "Twilight" by Boris Ugarov, "Spring in countryside", "Evening on the Volkhov River", "A Wind", "Spring water" by Ivan Varichev, "Pink Day in Crimea", "Veranda" by German Yegoshin, "Russian motive" by Vecheslav Zagonek, "A Road to Ashtarak" by Ruben Zakharian, and some others.

Still life paintings was represented by the works of "Still life with wild flowers", "Rowan and apple tree", "Still life with red bottle" by Evgenia Antipova, "Still life with plates" by Olga Bogaevskaya, "Still life on the pink table-cloth", "Violets" by Maya Kopitseva, "Poppies", "Still life with a crimson cloth" by Gevork Kotiantz, "Plums on a pink drapery" by Gavriil Malish, "Still life with a cup" by Anatoli Nenartovich, "Roses" by Victor Oreshnikov, "Cornflowers" by Sergei Osipov, "Autumn. Chrysanthemums" by Valentina Rakhina, "Holiday Bouquet" by Boris Shamanov, "A Lilac" by Elena Skuin, "Calla lilies. Still life", "Peonies", "Red lilies and a dresser" by Victor Teterin, "Apples in golden vase", "Wildflowers" by Leonid Tkachenko, "Basket with saffron milk caps" by Vitaly Tulenev, and some others.

== Acknowledgment ==
The Regional Art Exhibition of 1980 was widely covered in press and in literature specialized at Soviet fine art.

== See also ==
- Fine Art of Leningrad
- Soviet art
- 1975 in fine arts of the Soviet Union
- Leningrad School of Painting
- Saint Petersburg Union of Artists
- Socialist realism

== Sources ==
- Зональная выставка произведений ленинградских художников 1980 года. Каталог. Л., Художник РСФСР, 1983.
- Левандовский С. Живопись на ленинградской зональной. Искусство, 1981, No. 2. С.62.
- Лоховинин Ю. На новом этапе // Художник. 1981, No. 1. C.2-7.
- Леняшин В. Поиски художественной правды // Художник. 1981, No. 1. C.8-17.
- Справочник членов Ленинградской организации Союза художников РСФСР. Л., Художник РСФСР, 1980.
- Художники народов СССР. Биобиблиографический словарь. Т.1-4. М., Искусство, 1970–1995.
- Справочник членов Союза художников СССР. Том 1,2. М., Советский художник, 1979.
- Славин К., Славина Н. Были мы молоды. СПБ., РИД, 2000, с. 437–44.
- Дмитренко А. Зональные (региональные) и республиканские выставки в художественной жизни России 1960-1980-х годов. // Время перемен. Искусство 1960—1985 в Советском Союзе. СПб., Государственный Русский музей, 2006. С.31-33. ISBN 5-93332-199-0.
- Time for Change. The Art of 1960-1985 in the Soviet Union. Saint Petersburg, State Russian Museum, 2006. P.380.
- Sergei V. Ivanov. Unknown Socialist Realism. The Leningrad School. Saint Petersburg: NP-Print Edition, 2007. P.400-401. ISBN 5-901724-21-6, ISBN 978-5-901724-21-7
- Юбилейный Справочник выпускников Санкт-Петербургского академического института живописи, скульптуры и архитектуры имени И. Е. Репина Российской Академии художеств. 1915—2005. СПб., «Первоцвет», 2007.
- Дмитренко А. Творчество Ленинградских художников в контексте зональных выставок 1960-1980-х гг. Краткий экскурс // 80 лет Санкт-Петербургскому Союзу художников. Спб: 2012. C.10-11.
