= 1972 in fine arts of the Soviet Union =

The year 1972 was marked by many events that left an imprint on the history of Soviet and Russian Fine Arts.

== Events ==
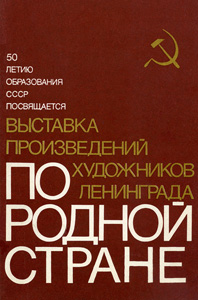
Exhibition Catalog

- September 22 — The Fourth Zonal Exhibition of Leningrad artists «Across of Motherland», dedicated to 50th Anniversary of USSR was opened in Russian museum and in the Leningrad Union of Artists. The participants were Evgenia Antipova, Nikolai Baskakov, Olga Bogaevskaya, Sergei Frolov, Nikolai Galakhov, Vasily Golubev, Tatiana Gorb, Vladimir Gorb, Irina Dobrekova, Mikhail Kaneev, Mikhail Kozell, Marina Kozlovskaya, Engels Kozlov, Maya Kopitseva, Boris Korneev, Elena Kostenko, Nikolai Kostrov, Anna Kostrova, Gevork Kotiantz, Yaroslav Krestovsky, Ivan Lavsky, Oleg Lomakin, Dmitry Maevsky, Gavriil Malish, Evsey Moiseenko, Piotr Nazarov, Samuil Nevelshtein, Dmitry Oboznenko, Sergei Osipov, Nikolai Pozdneev, Ivan Savenko, Gleb Savinov, Vladimir Sakson, Arseny Semionov, Alexander Sokolov, German Tatarinov, Victor Teterin, Nikolai Timkov, Mikhail Trufanov, Yuri Tulin, Vitaly Tulenev, Ivan Varichev, Igor Veselkin, Valery Vatenin, Vecheslav Zagonek, and other important Leningrad artists.

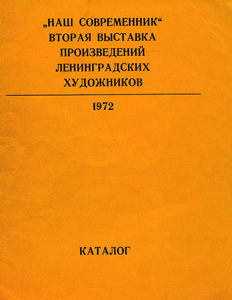
Exhibition Catalog

- The Second Exhibition of Leningrad artists named «Our Contemporary» was opened in Russian museum in Leningrad. The participants were Irina Baldina, Nikolai Baskakov, Piotr Belousov, Nikolai Galakhov, Irina Getmanskaya, Tatiana Gorb, Irina Dobrekova, Alexei Eriomin, Engels Kozlov, Maya Kopitseva, Boris Korneev, Elena Kostenko, Nikolai Kostrov, Anna Kostrova, Gevork Kotiantz, Boris Lavrenko, Oleg Lomakin, Dmitry Maevsky, Vera Nazina, Samuil Nevelshtein, Dmitry Oboznenko, Sergei Osipov, Kapitolina Rumiantseva, Ivan Savenko, Vladimir Sakson, Arseny Semionov, Alexander Shmidt, Nikolai Timkov, Anatoli Vasiliev, Vecheslav Zagonek, and other important Leningrad artists.
- The All-Union Art Exhibition named «The USSR is the Our Motherland» was opened in Moscow. The participants were Nikolai Baskakov, Maya Kopitseva, Evsey Moiseenko, Nikolai Pozdneev, Vladimir Sakson, Ivan Savenko, Gleb Savinov, Yuri Tulin, Vitaly Tulenev, Vecheslav Zagonek, and other important Leningrad artists.
- The Exhibition of works by eleven Leningrad artists (known afterwards as an «Exhibition of Eleven») was opened in the Exhibition hall of the Union of Artists of the Russian Federation on Sverdlov embankment. The participants were Evgenia Antipova, Zaven Arshakuny, German Egoshin, Yaroslav Krestovsky, Valentina Rakhina, Boris Shamanov, Konstantin Simun, Victor Teterin, Leonid Tkachenko, Vitaly Tulenev, and Valery Vatenin. They presented the «left wing» of the Leningrad Union of Artists.
- The Exhibition of works by Nikolai Rutkovsky (1892–1968) was opened in the Leningrad Union of Artists.
- The Exhibition of works by Yuri Tulin was opened in the Leningrad Union of Artists.
- The Exhibition of works by Boris Ugarov was opened in Leningrad in the Museum of the Academy of Arts.

== Deaths ==
- March 15 — Aleksandr Laktionov (Russian: Лактионов Александр Иванович), Russian soviet painter, People's Artist of the RSFSR, Stalin Prize winner (b. 1910).
- May 5 — Martiros Saryan (Russian: Сарьян Мартирос Сергеевич), Armenian soviet painter, People's Artist of the USSR, Stalin Prize winner, Lenin Prize winner (b. 1880).
- September 19 — Boris Prorokov (Russian: Пророков Борис Иванович), Russian soviet graphic artist, People's Artist of the USSR, Stalin Prize winner, Lenin Prize winner (b. 1911).
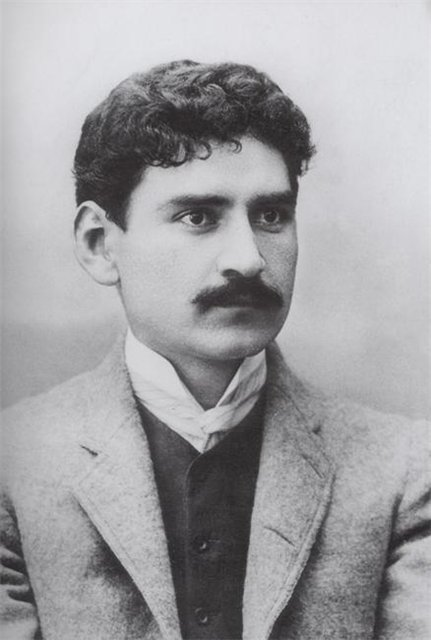
Martiros Saryan

== See also ==
- List of Russian artists
- List of painters of Leningrad Union of Artists
- Saint Petersburg Union of Artists
- Russian culture

== Sources ==
- «Наш современник». Вторая выставка произведений ленинградских художников. 1972 год. Живопись. Графика. Скульптура. Каталог. Л., Художник РСФСР, 1973.
- Выставка произведений художников Ленинграда «По родной стране». Каталог. Л., Художник РСФСР, 1974.
- Колесова О. Широка страна моя ... Творческий отчёт ленинградских художников, посвящённый 50-летию образования СССР // Ленинградская правда, 1972, 23 сентября.
- Колесова О. Вокруг выставки // Ленинградская правда, 1972, 7 декабря.
- Всесоюзная художественная выставка «СССР — наша Родина», посвященная 50-летию образования СССР. Каталог. М., Советский художник, 1972.
- Каталог выставки произведений одиннадцати художников. Л., Художник РСФСР, 1976.
- Юрий Нилович Тулин. Каталог выставки. Л., Художник РСФСР, 1972.
- Рутковский Николай Христафорович. Каталог выставки. Л., Художник РСФСР, 1972.
- Угаров Борис Сергеевич. Каталог выставки. Л., Художник РСФСР, 1972.
- Artists of Peoples of the USSR. Biography Dictionary. Vol. 1. Moscow, Iskusstvo, 1970.
- Artists of Peoples of the USSR. Biography Dictionary. Vol. 2. Moscow, Iskusstvo, 1972.
- Directory of Members of Union of Artists of USSR. Volume 1,2. Moscow, Soviet Artist Edition, 1979.
- Directory of Members of the Leningrad branch of the Union of Artists of Russian Federation. Leningrad, Khudozhnik RSFSR, 1980.
- Artists of Peoples of the USSR. Biography Dictionary. Vol. 4 Book 1. Moscow, Iskusstvo, 1983.
- Directory of Members of the Leningrad branch of the Union of Artists of Russian Federation. – Leningrad: Khudozhnik RSFSR, 1987.
- Artists of peoples of the USSR. Biography Dictionary. Vol. 4 Book 2. – Saint Petersburg: Academic project humanitarian agency, 1995.
- Link of Times: 1932 – 1997. Artists – Members of Saint Petersburg Union of Artists of Russia. Exhibition catalogue. – Saint Petersburg: Manezh Central Exhibition Hall, 1997.
- Matthew C. Bown. Dictionary of 20th Century Russian and Soviet Painters 1900-1980s. – London: Izomar, 1998.
- Vern G. Swanson. Soviet Impressionism. – Woodbridge, England: Antique Collectors' Club, 2001.
- Время перемен. Искусство 1960—1985 в Советском Союзе. СПб., Государственный Русский музей, 2006.
- Sergei V. Ivanov. Unknown Socialist Realism. The Leningrad School. – Saint-Petersburg: NP-Print Edition, 2007. – ISBN 5-901724-21-6, ISBN 978-5-901724-21-7.
- Anniversary Directory graduates of Saint Petersburg State Academic Institute of Painting, Sculpture, and Architecture named after Ilya Repin, Russian Academy of Arts. 1915 – 2005. – Saint Petersburg: Pervotsvet Publishing House, 2007.
