= Exhibition of Eleven (Leningrad, 1972) =

1972 Soviet art exhibition

Quince and Teapot
- Artist: Victor K. Teterin
- Year: 1966
- Location: Private collection, Russia

The Exhibition of eleven artists (Russian: Выставка произведений одиннадцати ленинградских художников 1972 года) was opened at the end of 1972 in Leningrad on the Okhta district in the new Exhibition Hall of the Union of Artists of the Russian Federation. It became a significant important event in the Soviet fine art of the 1970s-1980s.

== History ==
The idea of the exhibition came from three artists - Valery Vatenin, German Yegoshin, and Zaven Arshakuny. These artists were friendly since 1950, when they studied in the painting department of Repin Institute. They invited other Leningrad painters to take part in this exhibition, including Yaroslav Krestovsky, Boris Shamanov, Leonid Tkachenko, husband and wife Victor Teterin and Evgenia Antipova from the elder generation, Valentina Rakhina, a wife of German Yegoshin, a young talented artist Vitaly Tulenev and sculptor Konstantin Simun.

== Contributing artists ==
Ten known artists and a sculptor were participants of this exhibition:

- Valery Vladimirovich Vatenin (1933-1977)
- German Pavlovich Yegoshin (1931-2009)
- Boris Ivanovich Shamanov (1931-2008)
- Yaroslav Igorevich Krestovsky (1925-2003)
- Leonid Anisimovich Tkachenko (b. 1927)
- Vitaly Ivanovich Tulenev (1937-1998)
- Evgenia Petrovna Antipova (1917-2009)
- Victor Kuzmich Teterin (1922-1991)
- Valentina Ivanovna Rakhina (1932-2013)
- Zaven Petrosovich Arshakuny (1932-2012)
- Konstantin Mikhailovich Simun (b. 1934)

== Contributed artworks ==
- Evgenia Antipova: "Girl in front of the Apple Tree", "Children in the Garden" (1964), "Workwoman`s Portrait" (1965), "Stil life with Sparrows", "Crymea Landscape", "Almond Tree" (1966), "Still life with Red Tulips", "Roses and Basket", "Grapes Pergola" (1968), "Spring", "In the Garden", "Winter Window", "Landscape with Foros Cape" (1969), "Window" (1970), "Blooming Apple Tree", "Road among the Olive-trees" (1971) and others.
- Victor Teterin: "Griboedov`s Channel" (1965), "Quince and a Teapot", "Chrysanthemums" (1966), "Quince and Paints", "Rostov the Great" (1967), "December in Crymea", "Dresser", "Reminiscences about Venice" (1968), "Olives", "Inerior", "White Night near Sennaya Sqwear", "Reminiscences about Velázquez" (1969), "Pink House", "Still life with Rose", "Poplars", "Tulips" (1970), "Girl in Pink", "Still life with Curd Tart" (1971) and others.
- German Yegoshin: "Self portrait in Old Costume", "Women on the Sofa" (1967), "Flowers and the Mirror" (1967), "Garden near Nikolsky Cathedral", "Bush", "Glass", "Fontanka. Frost" (1968), "Street in Gursuf", "Still life with Samovar", "Stone Pines" (1969), "Almond Tree", "Blue Gursuf" (1970), "Griboedova Channel. Twylight", "Windy Day. Trees" (1970), "Bouquet" (1971), "Window" (1972) and others.
- Vitaly Tulenev: "Big Water", "Spring Evening", "Forest River", "River Krupen" (1969), "Evening", "Dream", "Spring", "Lake", "Aspens in Water", "Fishermen", "Clearing", "Staks", "On the Bank" (1970), "Blue Day", "Windy Day", "Warm Day", "Farm" (1971), "Street of Childhood", "Boy and the Pigeons", "Evening Sun", "Thaw", "On the Raft" (1972) and others.
- Boris Shamanov: "Willows", "Red Fishes" (1962), "Bleu River", "Old Iron", "Girl with Pussy-willow" (1963), "Supper in the Country" (1964-1969), "Portrait of Wife", "Still life with Cucumbers" (1964), "Autumn. Flowers", "Wild Flowers. Morning" (1965), "Girl in a Blue Dress", "Country Window", "Portrait of Father" (1966), "An Autumnal Flowers" (1970), "Izhborsk. Rye" (1962), "Kitchen Table" (1963), Pink Dahlia" (1971), "Old Icon" (1971) and others.
- Leonid Tkachenko: "Portrait of Artists G.Yegoshin, Z. Arshakuny, Y. Krestovsky" (1968), "An Artist Boris Ermolayev`s Portrait" (1969), "Portrait of N. Kozyrev", "Crystal" (1969), "Flowers in a White Vase", "Cup and Decanter" (1970), "Krasnoyarsk Hydroelectric Power Station", "Giordano Bruno", "Still life with Crystal" (1971), "Lilies" (1971) and others.
- Valery Vatenin: "In the Studia", "On the Boulevard", "Girl, Lamp and Bird" (1965), "An Artist and a Model" (1967), "The Self-portrait" (1971), "Portrait of Svetlana" (1964), "Stil life with Glass" (1966), "Birds and Fishes", "In the Twylight" (1968), "Sea and Children" (1971), "Bride" (1972), "Self-portrait and a Model" (1968), "Girl in Violet" (1969), "White Night at Studia" (1970), "Red Still life" (1972) and others.
- Zaven Arshakuny: "New Bridge" (1964), "Last Tram" (1966), "New Year Night" (1967), "Carnival", "Still life with Mirror" (1969), "Portrait of Artist M. Azizyan" (1964), "Morning", "Samovar" (1969), "Woman with Fruits" (1972), "Flowers" (1971), "Window" (1968), "Fishermen" (1969), "Morning" (1969) and others.
- Yaroslav Krestovsky: "New Outskirts", "Blue Still life", "Blue Rooster. Night" (1964), "Architecture", "Cage with Parrots", "Big Old House" (1965), "Interior with Mannequin", "Still life with Axe" (1966), "White Night", "Novgorod Village", "Pine", "Building in Kupchino" (1967), "Still life with Aquarium", "Twylight" (1968), "Ded Tree" (1971) and others.
- Valentina Rakhina: "Spring. Obvodny Channel" (1964), "Still life with Flatfish" (1966), "Obvodny Channel in Autumn" (1964), "White Roses" (1967), "Still life with Strawberry" (1968), "Still life with Red Tray", "Dry Branch", "Pechora" (1970), "Prickles" (1971), "Still life in front of Mountains" (1971), "Aquarium" (1972), "Balcony. Fruits of Wild Rose", "In Damask" (1972) and others.
- Konstantin Simun: "Motherhood", granite (1958), model of monument "Road of Life", marble (1965),"Portrait of Kazakh", shamotte (1966), "Portrait of Fesherman", marble; "Painted Head", shamotte; "Vase", shamotte (1967), "Woman's Portrait", marble (1968); "Clownery", faience (1969), "Portrait of A. Block", bronze; "Poetess M. Tsvetaeva", bronze; "Circus", shamotte; "Two Blooming Trees", faience (1970) and others.

== Exhibition ==
The Exhibition of eleven Leningrad artists (called later as the exhibition of "Eleven") was opened October 24, 1972. It showed the creation of the "left wing" of the Leningrad Union of Soviet Artists in concentration. That is why it was of such interest of spectators, critics and artists of Leningrad.

Opinions and reviews were very polarized, from the admiration of the critic to a full rejection. Apologetes of the exhibition and creation of these artists contrasted with painting of socialistic realism and academy tradition. On the contrary critics were pointed to the entrainment of the studies and the formal tasks in the process of creation. They declared that couldn`t find the picture of traditional Russian art.

== Group of "Eleven" ==
The name "Eleven" was fixed after this exhibition. Even though this group existed only for two exhibitions, it went down in history. The second exhibition was in 1976 at the same place and just 9 artists of the original 11 took part in it. In the future they demonstrated their art works in solo or in the big common exhibitions with two or three participants in Moscow and Leningrad. In 1990 the members of "Eleven" engaged in the common exhibition of 26 Leningrad and Moscow artists in Central Exhibition Hall "Manezh" in Saint-Petersburg.

In 1998 the exhibition of art works of group "Eleven" was in the Nekrasov's Memorial Museum in Saint-Petersburg. There were represented art-pieces from the private collections. In 2012 the exhibition of 200 art works of the group "Eleven" and their surroundings from the private collections was opened in K-Gallery (Saint-Petersburg). It was devoted to the 40th anniversary of the Exhibition of "Eleven" in Okhta in 1972.

== See also ==
- Fine Art of Leningrad
- Leningrad School of Painting
- 1972 in fine arts of the Soviet Union
- Saint Petersburg Union of Artists
- Socialist realism

== Sources ==
- Колесова О. Вокруг выставки // Ленинградская правда, 7 декабря 1972.
- Стенограмма обсуждения выставки одиннадцати ленинградских художников. 11 ноября 1972 года // СПб, Архив СПСХ.
- Каган М. О романтическом // Творчество. 1973. № 11. С. 12-14.
- Каталог выставки одиннадцати ленинградских художников. Л., Художник РСФСР, 1976.
- Мочалов Л. Выставка произведений двадцати шести ленинградских и московских художников. Каталог. Л., Художник РСФСР. 1990.
- Мочалов Л. По направлению к идеалу. Искусство Ленинграда, 1990. №12.
- Фрайкопф Г. "Одиннадцать" или созвездие Тау-Кита. СПб., ICAR. 1996.
- Художники круга 11-ти. Из собрания Н. Кононихина. СПб, Мемориальный музей Н. А. Некрасова, 1998.
- Ткаченко Л. Путь. Записки художника. СПб, 1998.
- Мочалов Л. Группа «Одиннадцати». Взгляд в ретроспективе с личными воспоминаниями // Художник Петербурга. № 5, 2000 - № 9, 2002.
- Ватенина Н. Валерий Ватенин. Спб., 2006.
- Хроника узловых событий художественной жизни России. 1960-1980-е годы // Время перемен. Искусство 1960-1985 в Советском Союзе/ Альманах. Вып. 140. СПб, Palace Editions, 2006. С.377.
- Time for Change. The Art of 1960-1985 in the Soviet Union. - Saint Petersburg: State Russian Museum, 2006. P.139, 172-173, 179, 217, 219, 224, 227.
- Sergei V. Ivanov. Unknown Socialist Realism. The Leningrad School.- Saint Petersburg: NP-Print Edition, 2007. ISBN 5-901724-21-6, ISBN 978-5-901724-21-7.
- Юбилейный Справочник выпускников Санкт-Петербургского академического института живописи, скульптуры и архитектуры имени И. Е. Репина Российской Академии художеств. 1915—2005. СПб., 2007.
- Одиннадцать. Каталог выставки. СПб., KGallery, 2012.
