= Leonid Tkachenko (artist) =

Russian painter (1927–2020)

Leonid Anisimovich Tkachenko
- Born: 28 March 1927; Pyatigorsk, USSR
- Died: December 2020 (aged 93)
- Education: Kharkov Art Institute
- Known for: Painting
- Movement: Realism, Conceptual art

Leonid Anisimovich Tkachenko (Russian: Леони́д Ани́симович Ткаче́нко; 28 March 1927 – December 2020) was a Soviet and Russian painter. A member of the Saint Petersburg Union of Artists (before 1992 the Leningrad branch of Union of Artists of Russian Federation), he lived and worked in Saint Petersburg, regarded as one of the leading representatives of the "left" wing of the Leningrad school of painting.

== Biography ==
Leonid Anisimovich Tkachenko was born 28 March 1927, in Pyatigorsk city, North Caucasus, USSR.

In 1950 Leonid Tkachenko graduated from Kharkov Art Institute. In 1950 he moved from Kharkov to Leningrad.

From 1950 Leonid Tkachenko participated in Art Exhibitions. He painted portraits, landscapes, genre and abstract compositions, still lifes. Leonid Tkachenko worked in oil painting and watercolour technique. His solo exhibitions were in Leningrad (1983) and Saint Petersburg (1996). In 1950 -1970 Leonid Tkachenko travelled by the virgin lands of Kazakhstan, building of Sayano-Shushenskaya Dam by ancient Russian towns Pskov, Veliky Novgorod, Vladimir, Suzdal and also in Siberia, Middle Asia and Zakarpatye. The expressions from this journeys reflected later in his creation.

In the 1960s in art of Leonid Tkachenko took place a gradual changes from academic style and plain air painting to the symbolic compositions and more plastic expression. There were a growing abstract role of colour and rhythm with subsequent release into the space of philosophical tasks of conceptual art in his work. He became the a delegate of the "left wing" of the Leningrad Union of Soviet Artists since that time.

Among his works there are "A Young Azerbaijanian", "An Old Azerbaijanian" (1948), "For the Great Projects" (1951). "1-st Line of Vasilievsky Island", "A Rays of Sunset", "Kostroma. Winter Evening", "The Airplane has Flew" (all 1955), "The Year 1917" (1957), "May-Day at Vasilievsky Island" (1958), "Call of Hiroshima" (1960), "Leningrad" (1961), "A Fine Day" (1962), "A Portrait of G. Egoshin, Z. Arshakuni, Y. Krestovsky" (1968), "Shah-i-Zinda. Samarkand", "Medrese of Abdulla-Khan. Bukhara", "A Vase" (1974), "Surgeon Amosov" (1975), "A Fantasy on the Reminiscence about Dante and Michelangelo", "Mayakovsky" (1976), "Golden Cactuses", "Apples in a Golden Vase" (both 1977), "A Concert for the Piano", "A Concert with the Ballerina" (both 1978), "L. Tolstoy" (1979), "Music for the World", "Wild Flowers" (both 1980), "Still life with Two Cactuses", "Still life with Snowdrops" (both 1981), "Alexander Block. A Fantasy" (1982), "To the Light" (1985), "A Composition with Two Candles" (1988), "Flying over Triumphal Arch" (1989), "Logos 1", "Destruction of Black Square" (both 1981) and many others.

In 1951 Leonid Tkachenko was admitted to the Leningrad Union of Soviet Artists (since 1992 known as the Saint Petersburg Union of Artists). A solo exhibition of Tkachenko was in Leningrad in 1983.

Between 1989 and 1992, his works were demonstrated at auctions and exhibitions of Russian paintings L' École de Leningrad in France.

Paintings by Leonid Anisimovich Tkachenko reside in State Russian Museum, State Tretyakov Gallery, in the lot of Art museums and private collections in Russia, USA, China, UK, Japan, and other countries.

Leonid Tkachenko was one of 11 Leningrad artists (called later as Exhibition of Eleven (Leningrad, 1972)), which was joined for the participation only at two exhibitions: in 1972 and 1976 to show the creation of the "left wing" of the Leningrad Union of Soviet Artists. There were Valery Vatenin, German Yegoshin, Zaven Arshakuny, Yaroslav Krestovsky, Boris Shamanov, husband and wife Victor Teterin and Evgenia Antipova, Valentina Rakhina, a wife of German Yegoshin, Vitaly Tulenev and sculptor Konstantin Simun. An art-critic Lev Mochalov was supported them.

Tkachenko died in December 2020, at the age of 93.

== See also ==
- Leningrad School of Painting
- List of Russian artists
- List of 20th-century Russian painters
- List of painters of Saint Petersburg Union of Artists
- Saint Petersburg Union of Artists

== Sources ==
- Художественная выставка 1950 года. Живопись. Скульптура. Графика. Каталог. М., Советский художник, 1950. C.66.
- Выставка произведений ленинградских художников 1951 года. Каталог. Л., Лениздат, 1951. C.20.
- Весенняя выставка произведений ленинградских художников 1954 года. Каталог. Л., Изогиз, 1954. C.19.
- Весенняя выставка произведений ленинградских художников 1955 года. Каталог. Л., ЛССХ, 1956. C.18.
- Весенняя выставка произведений ленинградских художников 1956 года. Каталог. Л., ЛССХ, 1956.
- 1917 - 1957. Выставка произведений ленинградских художников. Каталог. Л., Ленинградский художник, 1958. C.32.
- Бродский В. Жизнеутверждающее искусство // Ленинградская правда, 1957, 11 октября.
- Выставка произведений ленинградских художников 1960 года. Каталог. Л., Художник РСФСР, 1961. C.42.
- Выставка произведений ленинградских художников 1961 года. Каталог. Л., Художник РСФСР, 1964. C.40.
- Весенняя выставка произведений ленинградских художников 1971 года. Каталог. Л., Художник РСФСР, 1972. C.16.
- Каталог выставки одиннадцати ленинградских художников. Л., Художник РСФСР, 1976.
- Наш современник. Зональная выставка произведений ленинградских художников 1975 года. Каталог. Л., Художник РСФСР, 1980. C.26.
- Выставка произведений ленинградских художников, посвящённая 60-летию Великого Октября. Л., Художник РСФСР, 1982. C.22.
- Осенняя выставка произведений ленинградских художников. 1978 года. Каталог. Л., Художник РСФСР, 1983. C.16.
- Справочник членов Союза художников СССР. Т.2. М., Советский художник, 1979. C.432.
- Зональная выставка произведений ленинградских художников 1980 года. Каталог. Л., Художник РСФСР, 1983. C.24.
- Выставки советского изобразительного искусства. Справочник. Т.5. 1954-1958 годы. М., Советский художник, 1981. C.26, 142, 261, 387.
- Леонид Анисимович Ткаченко. Выставка произведений. Каталог. Л., Художник РСФСР, 1983.
- Мы побратимы - сохраним мир. Третья совместная выставка произведений художников Ленинграда и Дрездена. Дрезден, Бюро изобразительных искусств окружного совета Дрездена, 1986. C.120,207.
- Справочник членов Ленинградской организации Союза художников РСФСР. Л., Художник РСФСР, 1987. C.131.
- Russian Paintings. 1989 Winter Show. London, Roy Miles Gallery, 1989. P.5,64-65.
- Выставка произведений 26 ленинградских и московских художников. Каталог. Л., Художник РСФСР, 1990. C.38-39, 52.
- Новожилова Л И. Леонид Анисимович Ткаченко. Л., Художник РСФСР, 1991.
- L' École de Leningrad. Auction Catalogue. Paris, Drouot Richelieu, 27 Novembre 1989. P.62.
- L' École de Leningrad. Catalogue. Paris, Drouot Richelieu, 12 Mars 1990. P.124-125.
- L' École de Leningrad. Catalogue. Paris, Drouot Richelieu, 11 Juin 1990. P.86-87.
- Ленинградские художники. Живопись 1950-1980 годов. Каталог. СПб., Выставочный центр Санкт-Петербургского Союза художников, 1994. С.4.
- Этюд в творчестве ленинградских художников. Выставка произведений. Каталог. СПб., Мемориальный музей Н. А. Некрасова, 1994. С.6.
- Лирика в произведениях художников военного поколения. Выставка произведений. Каталог. СПб., Мемориальный музей Н. А. Некрасова, 1995. С.6.
- Живопись 1940-1990 годов. Ленинградская школа. Выставка произведений. СПб., Мемориальный музей Н. А. Некрасова, 1996. С.4.
- Связь времён. 1932-1997. Художники — члены Санкт-Петербургского Союза художников России. Каталог выставки. СПб., ЦВЗ "Манеж", 1997. С.299.
- Художники круга 11-ти. Из коллекции Николая Кононихина. СПб, Мемориальный музей Н. А. Некрасова, 2001. С.3.
- Художники - городу. Выставка к 70-летию Санкт-Петербургского Союза художников. Каталог. СПб., Петрополь, 2003. С.184.
- Time for change. The Art of 1960-1985 in the Soviet Union. - Saint Petersburg: State Russian Museum, 2006. P.227.
- Sergei V. Ivanov. Unknown Socialist Realism. The Leningrad School. - Saint Petersburg: NP-Print Edition, 2007. PP.21, 371, 388, 389, 391, 393, 394, 396, 398, 400, 402-407, 439, 444. ISBN 5-901724-21-6, ISBN 978-5-901724-21-7.
- А. В. Данилова. Группа одиннадцати как художественное явление в изобразительном искусстве Ленинграда 1960-1980 годов//Общество. Среда. Развитие. Научно-теоретический журнал. №3, 2010. С.160-164.
