= Yaroslav Krestovsky =

Russian painter

Yaroslav Igorevich Krestovsky
- Born: 9 February 1925; Leningrad, USSR
- Died: 23 January 2003 (aged 77); Saint Petersburg
- Education: Repin Institute of Arts
- Known for: Painting
- Movement: Realism

Yaroslav Igorevich Krestovsky (Russian: Яросла́в И́горевич Кресто́вский, 9 February 1925 – 23 January 2003) was a Soviet Russian painter, lived and worked in Leningrad - Saint Petersburg, cited by art historian Sergei V. Ivanov as one of the representatives of the Leningrad school of painting.

== Biography ==
Krestovsky was born on 9 February 1925 in Leningrad in the family of sculptor Igor Krestovsky (1894–1976; see also: Портрет скульптора Игоря Крестовского), a professor of the Ilya Repin Institute. Yaroslav Krestovsky is a grandson of the famous Russian prose-writer Vsevolod Krestovsky (1840–1895), the author of the novel The Slums of Saint Petersburg (1864).

From 1937 till 1941 Yaroslav studied at the Leningrad Secondary Art School of the All-Russian Academy of Arts. His teachers were Konstantyn Lepilov, Olga Bogaevskaya, Mikhail Natarevich. With the beginning of WWII, Yaroslav’s family was evacuated from Leningrad to Rostov the Great. After returning to Leningrad he enrolled the painting department of Vera Mukhina Higher School of Art and Design. In 1945 he lost an eye during a hunt.

From 1948 till 1950 he worked as an artist-restorer at the State restoration workshop.

In 1956 he graduated from Ilya Repin Institute, studying with Mikhail Bobyshov workshop. His diploma works were sketches of the scenery and costumes of Nikolai Rimsky-Korsakov's opera Snegurochka.

Since 1957 Krestovsky participated in exhibitions. He painted cityscapes, portraits, still lifes, and genre paintings.

In the 1960s, Yaroslav Krestovsky was a teacher with the Painting Department of the Leningrad Vera Mukhina Higher School of Art and Design.

Yaroslav Krestovsky was a member of Saint Petersburg Union of Artists (before 1992 Leningrad branch of Union of Artists of Russian Federation) since 1958.

He is an author of paintings: «Prionezhje. Kondopoga»[5] (1956), «Yachts», «White Night. Krukov Channel»[6] (both 1957), «Rostov», «Sunny Day in Leningrad[7], «Gryboedova Channel», «Fontanka. White Night», «Krukov Channe. Morning»[8] (all 1958), «Laundry Bridge», «At Vasylivsky Island»[9], «Court»[10][11] (all 1959), «Channel in the Morning», «White Night in Leningrad»[12] (both 1961), «Rosa. Portrait of Wife» (1962), «Fantasy on North Theme. Night»[13] (1963), «Frosty Day», «Evening. Baltyisky Factory», «Time of Sunrise. Fontanka»[14] (all 1964), «Still life with Mannequin»[15] (1965), «White Nights»[16] (1967), «Watchmakers»[17], «Dead Tree»[15] (both 1968), «Watchmaker. By the Motifs of Hoffmann's Tales»[18], «Storm of Tychvin»[17] (1969), «Kursk Edge. Counteroffensive to Belgorod»[19], «Watch and Dolls»[15] (both 1972), «Turbine Construction shop»[20], «Pickers»[21] (1975), «An Hour before Sunrise»[22], «Thunderstorm», «Troubled White Night»[23], «Leningrad Motif»[22] (all 1977) и and others.

Yaroslav Krestovsky was a participant of the Groupe "Eleven". The Exhibition of Eleven (Leningrad, 1972) artists (called later as the exhibition of "Eleven") was opened on 24 October 1972 in Okhta Exhibition Hall of the Union of Artists of the Russian Federation [25]. Another members of the Group were: artists Valery Vatenin, German Yegoshin, Zaven Arshakuny, Boris Shamanov, Leonid Tkachenko, husband and wife Victor Teterin and Evgenia Antipova, Valentina Rakhina, a wife of German Yegoshin, Vitaly Tulenev and sculptor Konstantin Simun with support of art-critic Lev Mochalov. It showed the creation of the "left wing" of the Leningrad Union of Soviet Artists in concentration. The second exhibition was in 1976 at the same place and just 9 artists of 11 took part in it. In the future they demonstrated their art works in solo or in the big common exhibitions with two or tree participants in Moscow and Leningrad. In 1990 the members of "Eleven" participated in the common exhibition of 26 Leningrad and Moscow artists in Central Exhibition Hall "Manezh" in Saint-Petersburg.

In 1970s the eyesight of Krestovsky suddenly began to fall, he couldn't paint from this time and lately went blind. His last works were executed in 1977.

Krestovsky died in Saint Petersburg on 23 January 2004. Paintings by Krestovsky are in State Russian Museum, State Tretyakov Gallery[26], in art museums and private collections in Russia, the United States, Japan, China, and throughout the world.

== See also ==
- Leningrad School of Painting
- List of Russian artists
- List of 20th-century Russian painters
- List of painters of Saint Petersburg Union of Artists
- Saint Petersburg Union of Artists

== Bibliography ==
- Directory of members of the Leningrad branch of Union of Artists of Russian Federation. - Leningrad: Khudozhnik RSFSR, 1987. - p. 66.
- Серебряная В. Ярослав Игоревич Крестовский. Л., Художник РСФСР, 1987.
- Matthew C. Bown. Dictionary of 20th Century Russian and Soviet Painters 1900-1980s. - London: Izomar, 1998. ISBN 0-9532061-0-6, ISBN 978-0-9532061-0-0.
- Anniversary Directory graduates of Saint Petersburg State Academic Institute of Painting, Sculpture, and Architecture named after Ilya Repin, Russian Academy of Arts. 1915 - 2005. - Saint Petersburg: Pervotsvet Publishing House, 2007.- p. 76. ISBN 978-5-903677-01-6.
- Grigor'yants E. Yaroslav Krestovskiy // Allgemeines Künstlerlexikon. — Walter de Gruyter. Band 81 — 2013.
