= 1989 in fine arts of the Soviet Union =

The year 1989 was marked by many events that left an imprint on the history of Soviet and Russian Fine Arts.

== Events ==
- January 28 — Exhibition of works by Igor Suvorov was opened in the Leningrad Union of Artists.
- Exhibition of works by Nikolai Mukho (1913–1986) was opened in the Leningrad Union of Artists.
- Exhibition of Leningrad artists dedicated to the 45th Anniversary of the complete liberation of Leningrad from the enemy blockade was opened in the halls of the Leningrad Union of Artists. The participants were Evgenia Baykova, Nikolai Baskakov, Lev Bogomolets, Anatoli Vasiliev, Krum Dzhakov, Elena Zhukova, Boris Korneev, Oleg Lomakin, Gavriil Malish, Piotr Nazarov, Yuri Neprintsev, Arseny Semionov, Nikolai Timkov, Sergei Frolov, and other important Leningrad artists.
- Exhibition of works by Georgy Savitsky (1887–1949) was opened in the Museum of the Academy of Arts in Leningrad
- Exhibition of works by Yuri Neprintsev dedicated to 80th Anniversary was opened in the Museum of the Academy of Arts in Leningrad
- Exhibition of works by Gavriil Malish was opened in the Leningrad Union of Artists.
- Exhibition of works by Alexander Shmidt was opened in the Leningrad Union of Artists.
- In Paris, France, successfully passed the initial exhibitions and art auctions of Russian paintings L 'École de Leningrad. They were the first widely introduced Westerners public visual artists of Leningrad of 1940-1980s. The participants were Vsevolod Bazhenov, Piotr Buchkin, Lev Bogomolets, Ivan Godlevsky, Boris Korneev, Elena Kostenko, Marina Kozlovskaya, Victor Oreshnikov, Victor Otiev, Vladimir Ovchinnikov, Vecheslav Ovchinnikov, Filaret Pakun, Rostislav Vovkushevsky, and other important Leningrad artists.

== Deaths ==
- January 16 — Fyodor Pustovoytov, Russian soviet painter (b. 1912).
- March 31 — Piotr Belousov, (Russian: Белоусов Пётр Петрович), Russian soviet painter and graphic artist, People's Artist of the RSFSR (b. 1912).
- June 9 — Piotr Vasiliev (Russian: Васильев Пётр Константинович), Russian soviet painter (b. 1909).
- November 9 — Valentin Kurdov, (Russian: Курдов Валентин Иванович), Russian soviet graphic artist, People's Artist of the RSFSR (b. 1905).
- November 27 – Sergei Luchishkin, (Russian: Лучишкин Сергей Алексеевич), Russian soviet painter and theatre artist, Honored Artist of the Russian Federation (b. 1902).

== See also ==
- List of Russian artists
- List of painters of Leningrad Union of Artists
- Saint Petersburg Union of Artists
- Russian culture

== Sources ==
- Подвигу Ленинграда посвящается. Выставка произведений ленинградских художников, посвященная 45-летию полного освобождения Ленинграда от вражеской блокады. Каталог. Л., Художник РСФСР, 1989.
- Выставка произведений 26 ленинградских и московских художников. Каталог. Л., Художник РСФСР, 1990.
- Юрий Михайлович Непринцев. Каталог выставки. Л., Художник РСФСР, 1989.
- Гавриил Кондратьевич Малыш. Выставка произведений. Каталог. Л., Художник РСФСР, 1988.
- Игорь Владимирович Суворов. Выставка произведений. Каталог. Л., ЛОСХ, 1987.
- Савицкий Георгий Константинович. 1887–1949. Каталог. Л., Художник РСФСР, 1989.
- Николай Антонович Мухо (1913–1986). Выставка произведений. Л., ЛОСХ, 1989.
- Александр Владимирович Шмидт. Выставка произведений. Л., ЛОСХ, 1989.
- L' École de Leningrad. Catalogue. Paris, Drouot Richelieu. 1989, June 16,.
- L' École de Leningrad. Catalogue. Paris, Drouot Richelieu. 1989, November 27,.
- Artists of Peoples of the USSR. Biobibliography Dictionary. Vol. 1. Moscow, Iskusstvo, 1970.
- Artists of Peoples of the USSR. Biobibliography Dictionary. Vol. 2. Moscow, Iskusstvo, 1972.
- Directory of Members of Union of Artists of USSR. Volume 1,2. Moscow, Soviet Artist Edition, 1979.
- Directory of Members of the Leningrad branch of the Union of Artists of Russian Federation. Leningrad, Khudozhnik RSFSR, 1980.
- Artists of Peoples of the USSR. Biobibliography Dictionary. Vol. 4 Book 1. Moscow, Iskusstvo, 1983.
- Directory of Members of the Leningrad branch of the Union of Artists of Russian Federation. – Leningrad: Khudozhnik RSFSR, 1987.
- Artists of peoples of the USSR. Biobibliography Dictionary. Vol. 4 Book 2. – Saint Petersburg: Academic project humanitarian agency, 1995.
- Link of Times: 1932 – 1997. Artists – Members of Saint Petersburg Union of Artists of Russia. Exhibition catalogue. – Saint Petersburg: Manezh Central Exhibition Hall, 1997.
- Matthew C. Bown. Dictionary of 20th Century Russian and Soviet Painters 1900-1980s. – London: Izomar, 1998.
- Vern G. Swanson. Soviet Impressionism. – Woodbridge, England: Antique Collectors' Club, 2001.
- Время перемен. Искусство 1960—1985 в Советском Союзе. СПб., Государственный Русский музей, 2006.
- Sergei V. Ivanov. Unknown Socialist Realism. The Leningrad School. – Saint-Petersburg: NP-Print Edition, 2007. – ISBN 5-901724-21-6, ISBN 978-5-901724-21-7.
- Anniversary Directory graduates of Saint Petersburg State Academic Institute of Painting, Sculpture, and Architecture named after Ilya Repin, Russian Academy of Arts. 1915 – 2005. – Saint Petersburg: Pervotsvet Publishing House, 2007.
