= Oleg Eremeev =

Russian painter

- Born: Oleg Arcadievich Eremeev; 28 September 1922; Petrograd, Soviet Russia
- Died: 16 March 2016 (aged 93)
- Education: Repin Institute of Arts
- Known for: Painting
- Movement: Realism
- Awards: Order of the Patriotic War; Medal "For the Victory Over Germany"; Medal "For the Defence of the Caucasus"

Oleg Arcadievich Eremeev (Russian: Олег Аркадьевич Еремеев; 28 September 1922 – 16 March 2016) was a Russian painter during the Soviet era, active in Leningrad. People's Artist of the Russian Federation, a full member of the Academy of Arts of the Russian Federation (2001), a head of the Repin Institute of Arts (1990–2001), and a member of the Saint Petersburg Union of Artists (before 1992 known as the Leningrad Union of Artists), who lived and worked in Saint Petersburg. He was regarded as one of the representatives of the Leningrad school of painting, most famous for his genre and portrait paintings. He died in 2016.

== See also ==
- List of 20th-century Russian painters
- List of painters of Saint Petersburg Union of Artists

== Bibliography ==
- Грабарь И. Заметки о живописи на Всесоюзной выставке 1957 года // Искусство. 1958, № 1. С.14-17.
- Ленинград. Зональная выставка 1964 года. Каталог. Л, Художник РСФСР, 1965. C.19.
- Колесова О. Две тысячи встреч. На выставке «Ленинград». // Ленинградская правда, 1964, 4 ноября.
- Каталог весенней выставки произведений ленинградских художников 1965 года. Л., Художник РСФСР, 1970. С.14.
- Наш современник. Зональная выставка произведений ленинградских художников 1975 года. Каталог. Л., Художник РСФСР, 1980. C.15.
- Изобразительное искусство Ленинграда. Каталог выставки. Л., Художник РСФСР, 1976. C.14.
- Выставка произведений ленинградских художников, посвящённая 60-летию Великого Октября. Л., Художник РСФСР, 1982. С.14.
- Справочник членов Союза художников СССР. Том 1. М., Советский художник, 1979. C.362.
- Зональная выставка произведений ленинградских художников 1980 года. Каталог. Л., Художник РСФСР, 1983. C.13.
- Справочник членов Ленинградской организации Союза художников РСФСР. Л., Художник РСФСР, 1987. C.42.
- Связь времён. 1932-1997. Художники - члены Санкт - Петербургского Союза художников России. Каталог выставки. СПб., ЦВЗ "Манеж", 1997. С.287.
- Matthew Cullerne Bown. A Dictionary of Twentieth Century Russian And Soviet Painters. 1900 — 1980s. — London: Izomar Limited, 1998.
- Мы помним… Художники, искусствоведы – участники Великой Отечественной войны. М., Союз художников России, 2000. С.104.
- Sergei V. Ivanov. Unknown Socialist Realism. The Leningrad School. Saint Petersburg, NP-Print Edition, 2007. P.391, 398, 403, 405, 406. ISBN 5-901724-21-6, ISBN 978-5-901724-21-7.
- Юбилейный Справочник выпускников Санкт-Петербургского академического института живописи, скульптуры и архитектуры имени И. Е. Репина Российской Академии художеств. 1915—2005. СПб., 2007. С.78.
- Участникам Второй мировой и Великой Отечественной войны посвящается... Альбом-каталог. СПб., 2010. С.38-41.
