= Semion Abugov =

Russian and Soviet painter and art educator (1877–1950)

Semion Lvovich Abugov
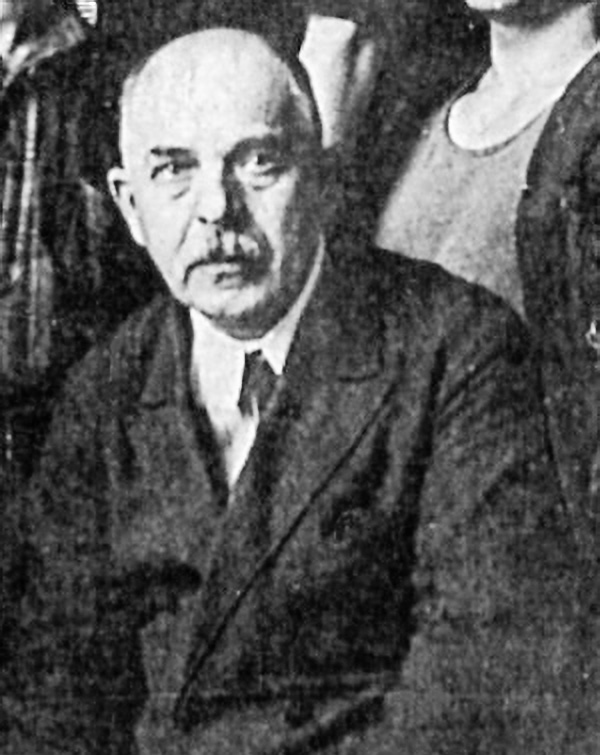
- Born: 30 December 1877; Byerazino, Minsk Governorate, Russian Empire
- Died: 3 May 1950 (aged 72); Leningrad, USSR
- Education: Higher Art School (1908)
- Known for: Painting
- Movement: Realism

Semion Lvovich Abugov (Russian: Семён Львович Абугов) (30 December 1877 – 3 May 1950) was a Russian and Soviet painter and art educator, who lived and worked in Leningrad, a member of the Leningrad Union of Artists, professor of the Repin Institute of Arts, regarded as one of the leading art educator of the Leningrad school of painting,

== Biography ==
Semion Abugov was born on 30 December 1877 in Byerazino village, Minsk Governorate (now Minsk Region, Belarus). In 1900 he graduated from the Odessa Drawing School. Then studied in Saint Petersburg at the Imperial Academy of Arts from Dmitry Kardovsky and Vladimir Makovsky. In 1908 he graduated from Academy of Arts with the title of the artist of painting. His graduate work was a picture named «Motherhood».

Semion Abugov participated in Art Exhibitions since 1908. He painted mainly portraits and landscapes. In 1918 Abugov participated in the design of Petrograd to the first anniversary of the October Revolution. Since 1920 Abugov primarily engaged in Art teaching, at first in Art Schools and studios of Leningrad, then from 1932 at the Leningrad Institute of Painting, Sculpture and Architecture at the All-Russian Academy of Arts. He was professor of painting since 1939.

Semion Abugov died on 3 May 1950 at the age of 72. He was buried in a Transfiguration Jewish cemetery in Leningrad.

== Pupils ==
- Alexander Debler
- Sergei Osipov
- Vecheslav Zagonek
- Evgenia Baykova
- Victor Teterin
- Evgenia Antipova
- Nikolai Mukho
- Nina Veselova
- Mikhail Natarevich
- Tatiana Kopnina
- Maria Rudnitskaya
- Boris Korneev
- Alexei Eriomin
- Vladimir Chekalov
- Elena Skuin
- Yuri Tulin
- Marina Kozlovskaya
- Elena Kostenko
- Alexander Koroviakov
- Lev Orekhov
- Abram Grushko
- Sergei Babkov
- Natan Voronov
- and a lot of others.

== See also ==
- Fine Art of Leningrad
- Leningrad School of Painting
- List of 20th-century Russian painters
- List of painters of Saint Petersburg Union of Artists
- Saint Petersburg Union of Artists

== Sources ==
- Художники народов СССР. Биобиблиографический словарь. Т. 1. М., Искусство, 1970. С.33.
- Sergei V. Ivanov. Unknown Socialist Realism. The Leningrad School. Saint Petersburg, NP-Print Edition, 2007. P.13, 15, 356, 359, 360, 362, 365, 367-370, 372, 379-381.
