= Lenin in Kremlin =

Painting by Nikolai Baskakov

- Artist: Nikolai N. Baskakov
- Year: 1960
- Medium: Oil on canvas
- Dimensions: 170 cm × 135 cm (67 in × 53 in)
- Location: private collection, Moscow

Lenin in Kremlin is a painting by Nikolai Nikolaevich Baskakov that depicts Vladimir Lenin in his office in the Kremlin, after the moving of the Soviet government from Petrograd to Moscow.

== History ==
Over the years, Baskakov turned to the image of Lenin. First of all he wanted to create an image of the man whom he believed to have taken upon himself the enormous responsibility of the fate of the country in the dramatic moments of the history of the Soviet Union. In 1956 Baskakov created the painting Lenin in the Gorki, where Lenin was depicted sitting in a chair on a summer day in the garden. The same approach is seen in his large genre painting Lenin in Kremlin of 1960.

The event shown in the picture likely relates to the second half of 1921. Nikolai Baskakov wanted to show Lenin as a statesman at the time of daily work, when in charge of solving the problem of economic and cultural development. In this painting, Lenin is thinking about the future of the young Soviet state, the younger generation, for whom the revolution has opened up new opportunities. Nikolai Baskakov embodied them in the image of the girl, the daughter of one of the officers of the government, that is drawing in Lenin's office.

In 2007 the painting Lenin in the Kremlin was reproduced and described among 350 art works by Leningrad artists in the book «Unknown Socialist Realism. The Leningrad School», published in Russian and English. In 2012 «Lenin in the Kremlin» was exhibited at the Art Show devoted to 80th Anniversary of the Saint Petersburg Union of Artists.

== See also ==
- Nikolai Baskakov
- List of 20th-century Russian painters
- Leningrad School of Painting

== Bibliography ==
- Artists of the USSR. Biography Dictionary. Volume 1. Moscow, Iskusstvo Edition, 1970. P.298–299.
- Изобразительное искусство Ленинграда. Каталог выставки. Л., Художник РСФСР, 1976. С.14.
- Vianor A. Kirillov. Nikolai Nikolaevich Baskakov. Leningrad, Khudozhnik RSFSR, 1991.
- Vern G. Swanson. Soviet Impressionism. Woodbridge, England, Antique Collectors' Club, 2001. P.186–188.
- Nikolai Baskakov. Lenin in Kremlin // 80 years of the Saint Petersburg Union of Artists. The Anniversary Exhibition. Saint Petersburg, 2012. P.203.
