= Quince and Teapot (painting) =

1966 painting by Victor Teterin

- Artist: Victor K. Teterin
- Year: 1966
- Medium: Oil on canvas
- Dimensions: 60 cm × 80 cm (24 in × 32 in)
- Location: private collection; Moscow

Quince and Teapot is a decorative still life of Russian painter Victor Kuzmich Teterin, which depicts the quince fruit and teapot on a silver tray.

== History ==
Painted in 1966, during a regular visit to Gurzuf, the painting Quince and Teapot (sometimes referred to as Quince) has become one of the most significant works of the artist, which was marked by a noticeable change in his creation. Composition of the painting is solved simply, "point-blank", which is quite consistent aesthetics "of the sixties." Quince fruit and teapot on a silver tray close to the viewer, occupy almost the whole plane of the canvas. Coloring picture of an unusually juicy and decorative. Painting a broad, relaxed. It is distinguished by courage picturesque generalizations. Teterin was the first to, in his words, "to understand Matisse" that is, to learn, to adapt for their own designs decorative pictorial principles of French painter, so long it is taken. In the picture the first time so powerfully apparent freedom of expression of the artist, the ease of implementation and emancipation of painting along with convincing plastic language.

From now on, the artist will focus color, rhythmic organization of the canvas, the transfer of light and air. These tasks will be subject to fairly conventional composition and drawing, which often will only serve to line, contour shape, color identified.

For the first time the painting Quince and Teapot was exhibited in 1972 on the famous "Exhibition of Eleven" Leningrad artists in the Leningrad Union of Artists. In 1988, picture was shown in the halls of the Leningrad Union of Artists at the solo exhibition of Victor Teterin. In 1997 the painting was twice exhibited in the Nikolai Nekrasov Memorial Museum, first at the "Artists of Group of the Eleven" Art Show, and then at the exhibition "In Memory of a Teacher. The Pupils of Alexander Osverkin". In 2007 the painting «Quince and Teapot» was reproduced and described among 350 art works by Leningrad artists in the book «Unknown Socialist Realism. The Leningrad School», published in Russian and English. In 2011 the painting «Quince and Teapot» was detail described in article by Sergei Ivanov "Still life at the Leningrad table", published in St. Petersburg Art History Notebooks. In 2012 «Quince and Teapot» was exhibited at the Art Show devoted to 80th Anniversary of the Saint Petersburg Union of Artists.

== See also ==
- Artist Victor Kuzmich Teterin (1922—1991)
- Exhibition of Eleven (Leningrad, 1972)
- Leningrad School of Painting
- List of Russian artists
- List of 20th-century Russian painters
- List of painters of Saint Petersburg Union of Artists
- List of the Russian Landscape painters
- Saint Petersburg Union of Artists

== Bibliography ==
- Каталог выставки одиннадцати ленинградских художников. Л., Художник РСФСР, 1976.
- Справочник членов Союза художников СССР. Т.2. М., Советский художник, 1979. С.424.
- Мочалов Л. Виктор Тетерин. Л., Художник РСФСР, 1982.
- Справочник членов Ленинградской организации Союза художников РСФСР. Л., Художник РСФСР, 1987. С.130.
- Виктор Кузьмич Тетерин. Выставка произведений. Каталог. Л., Художник РСФСР, 1988. С.6, 27.
- Евгения Антипова, Виктор Тетерин. Живопись. Рисунок. СПб., ЗАО «ПОНИ», 1999.
- Памяти учителя. Выставка петербургских художников — учеников мастерской А. А. Осмёркина. СПб., Мемориальный музей Н. А. Некрасова, 1997. С.4,5.
- Художники круга 11-ти. СПб., Мемориальный музей Н. А. Некрасова, 2001. С.3.
- Иванов С. Тихая жизнь за ленинградским столом // Петербургские искусствоведческие тетради. Выпуск 23. СПб., 2012. С.90-97.
- Тетерин В. К. Айва и чайник // 80 лет Санкт-Петербургскому Союзу художников. Юбилейная выставка. СПб., «Цветпринт», 2012. С.211.
