= Boris Maluev =

Russian painter (1929–1990)

- Борис Малуев
- Born: February 6, 1929; Stalingrad, USSR
- Died: October 24, 1990 (aged 61); Leningrad, USSR
- Education: Vera Mukhina Institute
- Known for: Painting
- Movement: Realism
- Awards: Honored Artist of the RSFSR

Boris Yakovlevich Maluev (Russian: Борис Яковлевич Малуев; February 6, 1929 – October 24, 1990) was a Soviet Russian painter, a member of the Leningrad Union of Artists, Honored Artist of the RSFSR, who lived and worked in Leningrad, was regarded as one of representatives of the Leningrad school of painting, and was most famous for his historical and genre paintings.

== See also ==
- Leningrad School of Painting
- List of 20th-century Russian painters
- List of painters of Saint Petersburg Union of Artists
- Saint Petersburg Union of Artists

== Bibliography ==
- Шведова В. Над чем работают ленинградские художники // Художник. 1959, № 9.
- Республиканская художественная выставка «Советская Россия». Каталог. — М: Советский художник, 1960. — с. 53.
- Выставка произведений ленинградских художников 1961 года. Каталог. — Л: Художник РСФСР, 1964. — с.26.
- Осенняя выставка произведений ленинградских художников 1962 года. Каталог. — Л: Художник РСФСР, 1962. — с.18.
- Ленинград. Зональная выставка. — Л: Художник РСФСР, 1965. — с.32.
- Копелян Г. Удачи и просчёты молодых // Смена, 1964, 28 ноября.
- Молдавский Д. «Ленинград». На зональных художественных выставках // Литературная Россия, 1964, 27 ноября.
- Каталог весенней выставки произведений ленинградских художников 1965 года. — Л: Художник РСФСР, 1970. — с.21.
- Никифоровская И. У художников весна. // Ленинградская правда, 1965, 19 июня.
- Вторая республиканская художественная выставка «Советская Россия». Каталог. — М: Советский художник, 1965. — с.26.
- Никифоровская И. Отчитываться мастерством. // Ленинградская правда, 1965, 26 ноября.
- Третья республиканская художественная выставка «Советская Россия». Каталог. — М: Министерство культуры РСФСР, 1967. — с.37.
- Аникушин М. О времени и о себе. // Вечерний Ленинград, 1967, 17 октября.
- Дмитренко А. О времени, о человеке... // Смена, 1967, 11 ноября.
- Осенняя выставка произведений ленинградских художников 1968 года. Каталог. — Л: Художник РСФСР, 1971. — с.11.
- Весенняя выставка произведений ленинградских художников 1969 года. Каталог. — Л: Художник РСФСР, 1970. — с.14.
- Выставка произведений ленинградских художников, посвящённая 25-летию победы над фашистской Германией. Каталог. — Л: Художник РСФСР, 1972. — с.8.
- Губарев А., Дмитренко А. В простом, казалось бы, мотиве ... // Вечерний Ленинград, 1971, 5 января.
- Весенняя выставка произведений ленинградских художников 1971 года. Каталог. — Л: Художник РСФСР, 1972. — с.11.
- Наш современник. Каталог выставки произведений ленинградских художников 1971 года. — Л: Художник РСФСР, 1972. — с.15.
- Осенняя традиционная. // Ленинградская правда, 1971, 11 декабря.
- Богданов А. Ярче показывать жизнь. // Вечерний Ленинград, 1971, 21 декабря.
- Наш современник. Вторая выставка произведений ленинградских художников 1972 года. Каталог. — Л: Художник РСФСР, 1973. — с.8.
- Колесова О. Широка страна моя ... Творческий отчёт ленинградских художников, посвящённый 50-летию образования СССР. // Ленинградская правда, 1972, 23 сентября.
- А. Богданов. Славя страну труда. Вечерний Ленинград, 1972, 10 октября.
- По родной стране. Выставка произведений художников Ленинграда. 50 Летию образования СССР посвящвется. Каталог. — Л: Художник РСФСР, 1974. — с.17.
- Наш современник. Зональная выставка произведений ленинградских художников 1975 года. Каталог. — Л: Художник РСФСР, 1980. — с.19.
- Изобразительное искусство Ленинграда. Каталог выставки. — Л: Художник РСФСР, 1976. — с.23.
- Выставка произведений ленинградских художников, посвящённая 60-летию Великого Октября. — Л: Художник РСФСР, 1982. — с.16.
- Осенняя выставка произведений ленинградских художников. 1978 года. Каталог. — Л: Художник РСФСР, 1983. — с.11.
- Громов Н. Тема вечная, современная. // Вечерний Ленинград, 1980, 14 апреля.
- Зональная выставка произведений ленинградских художников 1980 года. Каталог. — Л: Художник РСФСР, 1983. — с.17.
- Левандовский С. Живопись на Ленинградской зональной // Искусство. 1981, № 2. С.62.
- Справочник членов Ленинградской организации Союза художников РСФСР. — Л: Художник РСФСР, 1987. — с.80.
- Matthew Cullerne Bown. A Dictionary of Twentieth Century Russian And Soviet Painters. 1900 — 1980s. — London: Izomar Limited, 1998.
- Иванов С. Неизвестный соцреализм. Ленинградская школа. СПб., НП-Принт, 2007. С.393, 396, 397, 399, 404. ISBN 5-901724-21-6, ISBN 978-5-901724-21-7.
- Санкт-Петербургская государственная художественно-промышленная академия им. А. Л. Штиглица. Кафедра монументально-декоративной живописи. СПб, Искусство России. 2011. С.126.
