= Victor Korovin =

Russian painter

Viktor Korovin
- Виктор Коровин
- Born: 31 December 1936; Leningrad, Russian SFSR, Soviet Union
- Died: 6 July 1991 (aged 54); Leningrad, Russian SFSR, Soviet Union
- Education: Tavricheskaya Art School
- Known for: Painting
- Movement: Realism

Victor Ivanovich Korovin (Russian: Виктор Иванович Коровин; 31 December 1936 – 6 July 1991) was a Soviet Russian painter, a member of the Leningrad Union of Artists, who lived and worked in Leningrad. Victor Korovin regarded as one of representatives of the Leningrad school of painting, most famous for his landscape paintings. Died in an accident.

== See also ==
- Leningrad School of Painting
- List of 20th-century Russian painters
- List of painters of Saint Petersburg Union of Artists
- Saint Petersburg Union of Artists

== Sources ==
- Каталог весенней выставки произведений ленинградских художников 1965 года. — Л: Художник РСФСР, 1970. — с.17.
- Дмитренко А., Фёдорова Н. А где же молодость? О «Выставке молодых» // Смена, 1966, 11 ноября.
- Третья Республиканская художественная выставка «Советская Россия». Каталог. М., МК РСФСР, 1967. C.32.
- Осенняя выставка произведений ленинградских художников 1968 года. Каталог. — Л: Художник РСФСР, 1971. — с.9.
- Весенняя выставка произведений ленинградских художников 1969 года. Каталог. — Л: Художник РСФСР, 1970. — с.11.
- Весенняя выставка произведений ленинградских художников 1971 года. Каталог. — Л: Художник РСФСР, 1972. — с.10.
- По родной стране. Выставка произведений художников Ленинграда. 50 Летию образования СССР посвящвется. Каталог. — Л: Художник РСФСР, 1974. — с.15.
- Наш современник. Зональная выставка произведений ленинградских художников 1975 года. Каталог. — Л: Художник РСФСР, 1980. — с.17.
- Изобразительное искусство Ленинграда. Каталог выставки. — Л: Художник РСФСР, 1976. — с.20.
- Выставка произведений ленинградских художников, посвящённая 60-летию Великого Октября. — Л: Художник РСФСР, 1982. — с.15.
- Зональная выставка произведений ленинградских художников 1980 года. Каталог. — Л: Художник РСФСР, 1983. — с.15.
- Леняшин В. Поиски художественной правды // Художник. 1981, № 1. С.8-17.
- Справочник членов Ленинградской организации Союза художников РСФСР. — Л: Художник РСФСР, 1987. — с.62.
- Связь времен. 1932—1997. Художники — члены Санкт-Петербургского Союза художников России. Каталог выставки. — Санкт — Петербург: ЦВЗ «Манеж», 1997. — с.289.
- Matthew Cullerne Bown. A Dictionary of Twentieth Century Russian And Soviet Painters. 1900 — 1980s. — London: Izomar Limited, 1998.
