= Eugene Maltsev =

Russian painter (1929–2003)

Eugene Demjanovich Maltsev
- Born: 9 August 1929; Ryazan Oblast, USSR
- Died: 24 December 2003 (aged 74); Saint Petersburg, Russia
- Education: Repin Institute of Arts
- Known for: Painting
- Movement: Realism
- Awards: People's Artist of the Russian Federation

Eugene Demjanovich Maltsev (Russian: Евгений Демьянович Мальцев; 9 August 1929 – 24 December 2003) was a Soviet Russian painter, People's Artist of the Russian Federation, a member of the Saint Petersburg Union of Artists (before 1992 — the Leningrad Union of the Soviet Artists), who lived and worked in Leningrad. In 1990-1997 Eugene Maltsev was a head of the Saint Petersburg Union of Artists, in 1989-1991 was elected a People's Deputies of the Soviet Union from the USSR Union of Artists. Maltsev regarded as one of representatives of the Leningrad school of painting, most famous for his portrait and historical paintings.

== See also ==
- Fine Art of Leningrad
- Leningrad School of Painting
- List of 20th-century Russian painters
- List of painters of Saint Petersburg Union of Artists
- Saint Petersburg Union of Artists

== Sources ==
- 1917 - 1957. Выставка произведений ленинградских художников. Каталог. - Л: Ленинградский художник, 1958. - с.21.
- Всесоюзная художественная выставка, посвященная 40-летию Великой Октябрьской социалистической революции. Каталог. - М: Советский художник, 1957. - с.47.
- Осенняя выставка произведений ленинградских художников 1958 года. Каталог. - Л: Художник РСФСР, 1959. - с.18.
- Шведова В. Над чем работают ленинградские художники // Художник. 1959, № 9.
- Выставка произведений ленинградских художников 1960 года. Каталог. - Л: Художник РСФСР, 1961. - с.26.
- Выставка произведений ленинградских художников 1961 года. Каталог. - Л: Художник РСФСР, 1964. - с.26.
- Леонтьева Г. В пути // Художник. 1961, № 7. С.9-17.
- Аникушин М. Солнце на полотнах // Ленинградская правда, 1964, 3 ноября.
- Копелян Г. Удачи и просчёты молодых // Смена, 1964, 28 ноября.
- Вьюнова И. Главный герой - современник // Искусство. 1965, № 3. С.9.
- Осенняя выставка произведений ленинградских художников 1968 года. Каталог. - Л: Художник РСФСР, 1971. - с.11.
- Колесова О. Широка страна моя ... Творческий отчёт ленинградских художников, посвящённый 50-летию образования СССР. // Ленинградская правда, 1972, 23 сентября.
- Богданов А. Славя страну труда // Вечерний Ленинград, 1972, 10 октября.
- Наш современник. Зональная выставка произведений ленинградских художников 1975 года. Каталог. - Л: Художник РСФСР, 1980. - с.19.
- Дмитренко А. Мир современника // Ленинградская правда, 1975, 12 октября.
- Справочник членов Союза художников СССР. Т.2. М., Советский художник, 1979. C.18.
- Зональная выставка произведений ленинградских художников 1980 года. Каталог. - Л: Художник РСФСР, 1983. - с.17.
- Леняшин В. Поиски художественной правды // Художник. 1981, № 1. С.8-17.
- Справочник членов Ленинградской организации Союза художников РСФСР. — Л: Художник РСФСР, 1987. — с.34.
- Sergei V. Ivanov. Unknown Socialist Realism. The Leningrad School. Saint Petersburg, NP-Print Edition, 2007. P.392, 393, 402, 403. ISBN 5-901724-21-6, ISBN 978-5-901724-21-7.
- Юбилейный Справочник выпускников Санкт-Петербургского академического института живописи, скульптуры и архитектуры имени И. Е. Репина Российской Академии художеств. 1915—2005. — Санкт Петербург: «Первоцвет», 2007. — с.74.
