= Kim Slavin =

Russian painter (1928–1991)

- Ким Славин
- Born: 25 February 1928; Leningrad, Russian SFSR, Soviet Union
- Died: 14 February 1991 (aged 62); Leningrad, Russian SFSR, Soviet Union
- Education: Vera Mukhina Institute
- Known for: Painting
- Movement: Realism

Kim Nikolaevich Slavin (Russian: Ким Николаевич Славин; 25 February 1928 – 14 February 1991) was a Soviet Russian painter, a member of the Leningrad Union of Artists, who lived and worked in Leningrad. Kim Slavin, regarded as one of the representatives of the Leningrad school of painting, is most famous for his landscape paintings. For over forty years, Slavin kept a detailed diary, which was published after his death by his wife, Nina Slavina, a famous painter on porcelain.

== See also ==
- Leningrad School of Painting
- List of 20th-century Russian painters
- List of painters of Saint Petersburg Union of Artists
- Saint Petersburg Union of Artists

== Sources ==
- Осенняя выставка произведений ленинградских художников 1958 года. Каталог. - Л: Художник РСФСР, 1959. - с.25.
- Выставка произведений ленинградских художников 1960 года. Каталог. - Л: Художник РСФСР, 1961. - с.39.
- Республиканская художественная выставка «Советская Россия». Каталог. - М: Советский художник, 1960. - с.76.
- Выставка произведений ленинградских художников 1961 года. Каталог. - Л: Художник РСФСР, 1964. - с.37.
- Осенняя выставка произведений ленинградских художников 1962 года. Каталог. - Л: Художник РСФСР, 1962. - с.25.
- Ленинград. Зональная выставка. - Л: Художник РСФСР, 1965. - с.50.
- Каталог весенней выставки произведений ленинградских художников 1965 года. — Л: Художник РСФСР, 1970. - с.28.
- Осенняя выставка произведений ленинградских художников 1968 года. Каталог. - Л: Художник РСФСР, 1971. - с.15.
- Весенняя выставка произведений ленинградских художников 1969 года. Каталог. - Л: Художник РСФСР, 1970. - с.17.
- Весенняя выставка произведений ленинградских художников 1971 года. Каталог. - Л: Художник РСФСР, 1972. - с.15.
- По родной стране. Выставка произведений художников Ленинграда. 50 Летию образования СССР посвящается. Каталог. - Л: Художник РСФСР, 1974. - с.24.
- Весенняя выставка произведений ленинградских художников. Каталог. - Л: Художник РСФСР, 1974. - с.10.
- Наш современник. Зональная выставка произведений ленинградских художников 1975 года. Каталог. - Л: Художник РСФСР, 1980. - с.24.
- Пятая республиканская выставка «Советская Россия». - М: Советский художник, 1975. - с.42.
- Изобразительное искусство Ленинграда. Каталог выставки. - Л: Художник РСФСР, 1976. - с.30.
- Выставка произведений ленинградских художников, посвящённая 60-летию Великого Октября. - Л: Художник РСФСР, 1982. - с.21.
- Дмитренко А. Человек на своей земле // Ленинградская правда, 1977, 20 ноября.
- Зональная выставка произведений ленинградских художников 1980 года. Каталог. - Л: Художник РСФСР, 1983. - с.23.
- Леняшин В. Поиски художественной правды // Художник. 1981, № 1. С.8-17.
- Справочник членов Ленинградской организации Союза художников РСФСР. Л., Художник РСФСР, 1987. С.120.
- Интерьер и натюрморт. Выставка произведений живописи художников Российской Федерации. Каталог. - Л: Художник РСФСР, 1991. - с.54.
- Васильева Н., Славина Н. Ким Николаевич Славин. - СПб: Художник России, 1993.
- Связь времён. 1932–1997. Художники - члены Санкт - Петербургского Союза художников России. Каталог выставки. СПб., ЦВЗ "Манеж", 1997. С.298.
- Matthew Cullerne Bown. A Dictionary of Twentieth Century Russian And Soviet Painters. 1900 — 1980s. — London: Izomar Limited, 1998.
- Славин К., Славина Н. Были мы молоды. СПб., РИД, 2000. ISBN 978-5-89132-016-1.
- Sergei V. Ivanov. Unknown Socialist Realism. The Leningrad School. Saint Petersburg, NP-Print Edition, 2007. P.19, 24, 392, 393, 396-399, 439. ISBN 5-901724-21-6, ISBN 978-5-901724-21-7.
- Санкт-Петербургская государственная художественно-промышленная академия им. А. Л. Штиглица. Кафедра монументально-декоративной живописи. СПб., Искусство России. 2011. С. 101.
