= Valentina Rakhina =

Russian artist (1932–2013)

Valentina Ivanovna Rakhina
- Born: 9 June 1932 (age 93); Leningrad, USSR
- Died: 2013; Saint Petersburg
- Known for: Painting
- Movement: Realism

Valentina Ivanovna Rakhina (Russian: Валентина Ивановна Рахина; born 9 June 1932, Leningrad, USSR - 2013, Saint Petersburg, Russian Federation) was a Soviet Russian painter, graphic artist and art teacher, a member of the Saint Petersburg Union of Artists (before 1992 — the Leningrad Union of Artists), who lived and worked in Leningrad - Petersburg. Rakhina is regarded as one of representatives of the Leningrad school of painting.

== Biography ==
In 1959 Valentina Rakhina graduated from the Institute of Painting, Sculpture and Architecture in the Boris Ioganson workshop with the rank of artist of painting. His degree work was a painting titled A White Night.

In 1960 Rakhina was adopted into the Leningrad Union of Soviet Artists. Since 1959 she had participated in art exhibitions. In 1972 together with her husband, artist German Egoshin, she took part in the famous "Exhibition of Eleven" Leningrad artists. She painted landscapes, cityscapes, still life, and genre compositions.

== See also ==
- Fine Art of Leningrad
- Leningrad School of Painting
- List of 20th-century Russian painters
- List of painters of Saint Petersburg Union of Artists
- Saint Petersburg Union of Artists

== Sources ==
- Выставка произведений ленинградских художников 1960 года. Каталог. Л., Художник РСФСР, 1963. C.15.
- Выставка произведений ленинградских художников 1960 года. Каталог. Л., Художник РСФСР, 1961. C.34.
- Выставка произведений ленинградских художников 1961 года. Каталог. Л., Художник РСФСР, 1964. C.33.
- Каталог весенней выставки произведений ленинградских художников 1965 года. Л., Художник РСФСР, 1970. C.26.
- Никифоровская И. У художников весна // Ленинградская правда, 1965, 19 июня.
- Дмитренко А., Фёдорова Н. А где же молодость? О «Выставке молодых» // Смена, 1966, 11 ноября.
- Весенняя выставка произведений ленинградских художников 1969 года. Каталог. Л., Художник РСФСР, 1970. C.15.
- Весенняя выставка произведений ленинградских художников 1971 года. Каталог. Л., Художник РСФСР, 1972. C.14.
- По родной стране. Выставка произведений художников Ленинграда. 50-Летию образования СССР посвящается. Каталог. Л., Художник РСФСР, 1974. C.21.
- Каталог выставки одиннадцати ленинградских художников. Л., Художник РСФСР, 1976.
- Натюрморт. Выставка произведений ленинградских художников. Каталог. Л., Художник РСФСР, 1973. C.12.
- Весенняя выставка произведений ленинградских художников. Каталог. Л., Художник РСФСР, 1974. C.10.
- Наш современник. Зональная выставка произведений ленинградских художников 1975 года. Каталог. Л., Художник РСФСР, 1980. C.22.
- Леняшин В. Думая о будущем. Время. Художник. Творчество // Вечерний Ленинград, 1976, 26 января.
- Изобразительное искусство Ленинграда. Каталог выставки. Л., Художник РСФСР, 1976. C.27.
- Выставка произведений ленинградских художников, посвящённая 60-летию Великого Октября. Л., Художник РСФСР, 1982. C.20.
- Осенняя выставка произведений ленинградских художников. 1978 года. Каталог. Л., Художник РСФСР, 1983. C.14.
- Зональная выставка произведений ленинградских художников 1980 года. Каталог. Л., Художник РСФСР, 1983. C.21.
- Леняшин В. Поиски художественной правды // Художник. 1981, № 1. С.8-17.
- Валентина Ивановна Рахина. Выставка произведений. Каталог. Л., Художник РСФСР, 1985.
- Интерьер и натюрморт. Выставка произведений живописи художников Российской Федерации. Каталог. Л., Художник РСФСР, 1991. C.54.
- Выставка произведений 26 ленинградских и московских художников. Каталог. Л., Художник РСФСР, 1990.
- Связь времён. 1932-1997. Художники - члены Санкт-Петербургского Союза художников России. Каталог выставки. СПб., ЦВЗ "Манеж", 1997. С.296.
- Художники круга 11-ти. Из коллекции Николая Кононихина. СПб, Мемориальный музей Н. А. Некрасова, 2001. С.3.
- Юбилейный Справочник выпускников Санкт-Петербургского академического института живописи, скульптуры и архитектуры имени И. Е. Репина Российской Академии художеств. 1915—2005. СПб., «Первоцвет», 2007. С.83.
- Данилова А. Группа одиннадцати как художественное явление в изобразительном искусстве Ленинграда 1960-1980 годов // Общество. Среда. Развитие. Научно-теоретический журнал. №3, 2010. С.160-164.
