= Lev Bogomolets =

Russian painter (1911–2009)

Lev Konstantinovich Bogomolets
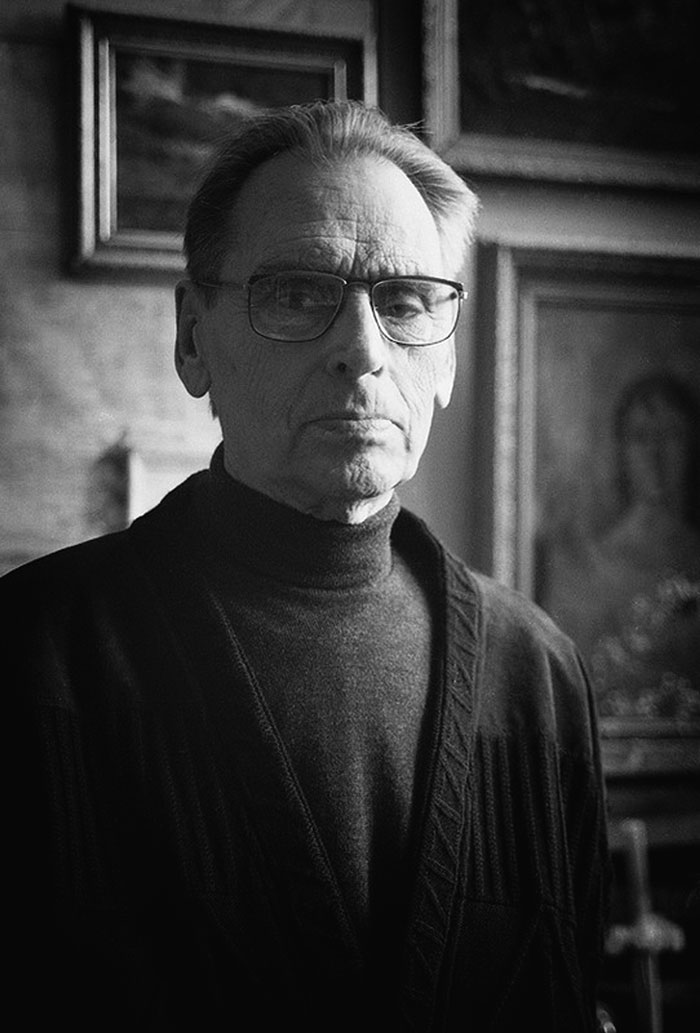
- Born: 11 January 1911; Biysk, Tomsk Governorate, Russian Empire
- Died: 10 July 2009 (aged 98); Saint Petersburg, Russia
- Education: Repin Institute of Arts
- Known for: Painting
- Movement: Realism

Lev Konstantinovich Bogomolets (Russian: Лев Константинович Богомолец; 11 January 1911, Biysk, Tomsk Governorate, Russian Empire — 10 July 2009, Saint Petersburg, Russia) was a Soviet Russian painter, a member of the Saint Petersburg Union of Artists (before 1992 known as the Leningrad Union of Artists), who lived and worked in Saint Petersburg, regarded as one of representatives of the Leningrad school of painting, most famous for his landscape paintings.

== See also ==
- Leningrad School of Painting
- List of 20th-century Russian painters
- List of painters of Saint Petersburg Union of Artists
- Saint Petersburg Union of Artists

== Bibliography ==
- Бродский В. Жизнеутверждающее искусство // Ленинградская правда, 1957, 11 октября.
- Герман М. Первые впечатления. Заметки о живописи и графике на осенней выставке // Вечерний Ленинград, 1961, 23 сентября.
- Выставка произведений ленинградских художников 1961 года. Каталог. Л., Художник РСФСР, 1964. С.10.
- Лев Константинович Богомолец. Выставка произведений. Каталог. - Л: Художник РСФСР, 1982.
- Directory of members of the Leningrad branch of Union of Artists of Russian Federation. Leningrad, Khudozhnik RSFSR, 1987. Р.16.
- Лев Богомолец. Живопись. Акварели. Этюды. Миниатюры. СПб., 1992.
- Соловьев В. Д. Русские художники XVIII—XX веков. Справочник. 1994, 1996 гг.стр. 453.
- Государственный Русский музей. Живопись. Первая половина XX в. Каталог. А-В, Т.8. СПб, 1997 г. стр. 75. (Кат.No. 378, Ж-6963).
- Художники народов СССР. Биобиблиографический словарь. Т.1. М., Искусство, 1970. С.435.
- Вольпина В. Б. Художественная и нравственная высота Льва Богомольца // Декоративное искусство. 2003, No. 3. С.102—104.
- Каталог. Московский международный художественный салон ЦДХ—2003. М., 2003. стр. 135–138.
- Лев Богомолец. Альбом. Текст Вольпиной В. Б. СПб., «Золотой век», 2004.
- Иванов С. Неизвестный соцреализм. Ленинградская школа. СПб., 2007. С.387, 388, 390–392, 395, 398, 400, 401, 403, 404, 406, 441, 442, 444, 445. ISBN 5901724216, ISBN 9785901724217.
- Художники - городу. Выставка к 70-летию Санкт-Петербургского Союза художников. Каталог. Петрополь, 2003. С.33, 178.
- Кривонденченков С. О преемственности традиций русского пейзажа. К 100-летнему юбилею художника Л. К. Богомольца // Петербургские искусствоведческие тетради. Вып. 21. СПб, 2011. С.41-45.
