= Vyacheslav Ovchinnikov (painter) =

Russian painter

Vyacheslav Vladimirovich Ovchinnikov
- Born: February 19, 1932; Leningrad, USSR
- Died: March 16, 1993 (aged 61); Saint Petersburg, Russia
- Education: Repin Institute of Arts
- Known for: Painting
- Movement: Realism

Vyacheslav Vladimirovich Ovchinnikov (Russian: Вячеслав Владимирович Овчинников; February 19, 1932 in Leningrad, USSR – March 16, 1993 in Saint Petersburg, Russia) was a Soviet Russian painter, a member of the Saint Petersburg Union of Artists (before 1992 — the Leningrad Union of Artists), who lived and worked in Leningrad, regarded as one of representatives of the Leningrad School of Painting, most famous for his landscape painting.

== See also ==
- Fine Art of Leningrad
- Leningrad School of Painting
- List of 20th-century Russian painters
- List of painters of Saint Petersburg Union of Artists
- Saint Petersburg Union of Artists

== Sources ==
- Выставка произведений ленинградских художников 1960 года. Каталог. — Л: Художник РСФСР, 1961. — с.29.
- Ленинград. Зональная выставка. — Л: Художник РСФСР, 1965. — с.37.
- Советская Россия. Третья Республиканская художественная выставка. Каталог. — М: Министерство культуры РСФСР, 1967. — с.42.
- Наш современник. Зональная выставка произведений ленинградских художников 1975 года. Каталог. Л., Художник РСФСР, 1980. C.21.
- Справочник членов Союза художников СССР. Т.2 М., Советский художник, 1979. C.145.
- Справочник членов Ленинградской организации Союза художников РСФСР. Л., Художник РСФСР, 1987. C.95.
- L' École de Leningrad. Auction Catalogue. Paris, Drouot Richelieu, 16 Juin 1989. P.74-75.
- Традиции школы живописи государственной художественно-промышленной академии имени А. Л. Штиглица. Кафедра общей живописи. СПб., 2010. С.15, 271.
