= Leningrad School of Painting =

Group of Soviet painters

The Museum of the Academy of Arts and Repin Institute
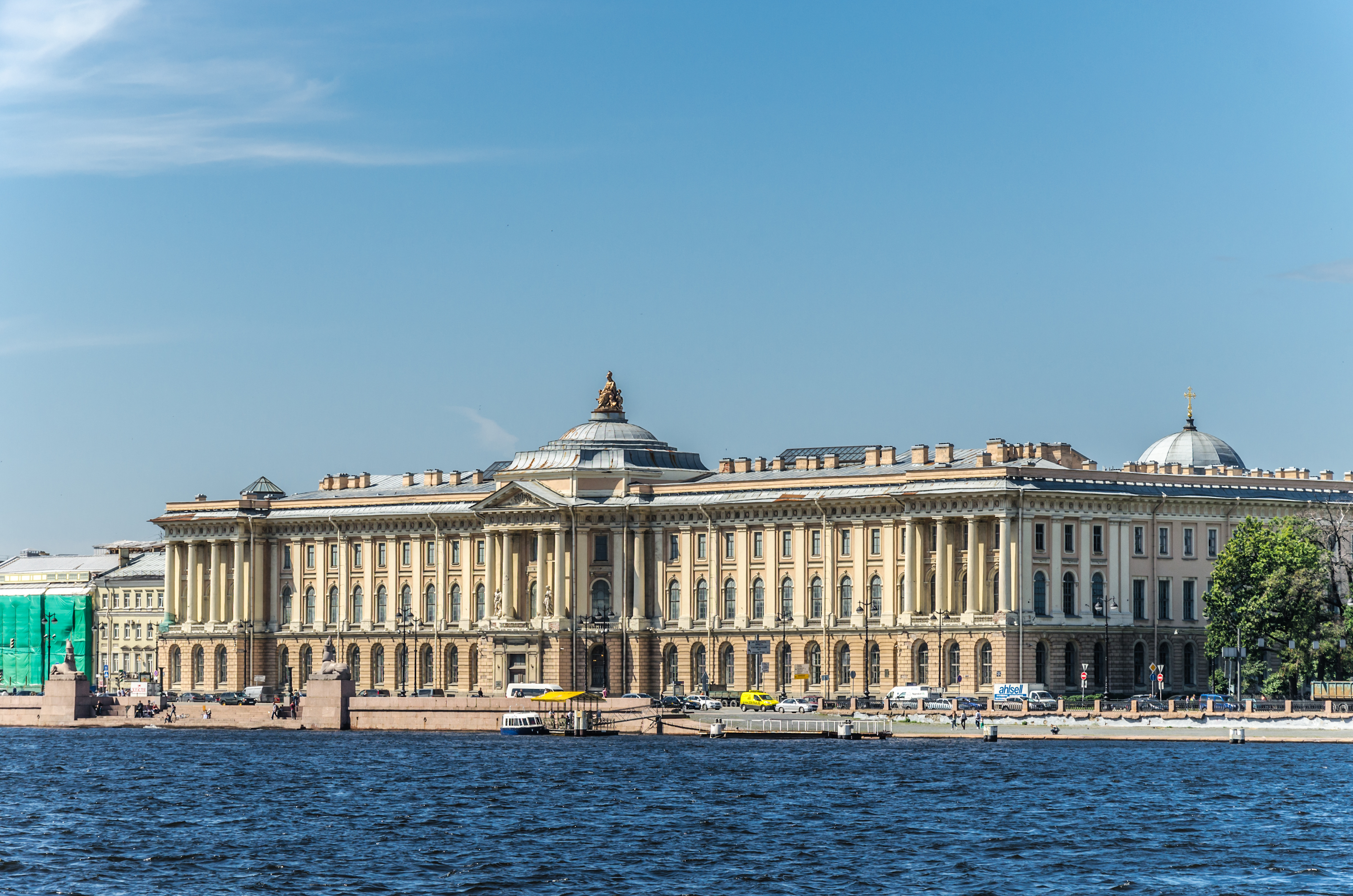
- View of the Academy of Arts building
- Established: 1765; 261 years ago
- Location: 17, University Embankment, Saint Petersburg, Russia
- Director: Semion Mikhaylovsky
- Website: www.artsacademy.ru

The Leningrad School of Painting (Russian: Ленинградская школа живописи) is a phenomenon that refers to a large group of painters who developed in Leningrad around the reformed Academy of Arts in 1930–1950 and was united by the Leningrad Union of Soviet Artists (1932–1991).

== History ==
The history of the Leningrad school covers the period from the early 1930s to the early 1990s. Its appearance was the result of a conflict resolution and the desire to reflect prevailing trends in the development of Soviet art and art education at the turn of the 1920s and 1930s. It was accelerated by the adoption in April 1932 by the Politburo of the Central Committee of the All-Union Communist Party of Bolsheviks decree "On the Restructuring of Literary and Artistic Organizations", which, inter alia, provided for the dissolution of the existing literature and arts organizations and groups and the formation of a unified creative union, as well as the adoption in October 1932 by the All-Russian Central Executive Committee and the Council of People's Commissars decree "On [the] creation of the Academy of Arts." In accordance with the Institute of proletarian art, it was transformed into the Institute of Painting, Sculpture and Architecture (since 1944 named after Ilya Repin). It has thus been placed officially instituted by the Soviet Union Government under the 15-year period of the destruction of the old art school and a continuous transformation of the largest art institutions in the country.

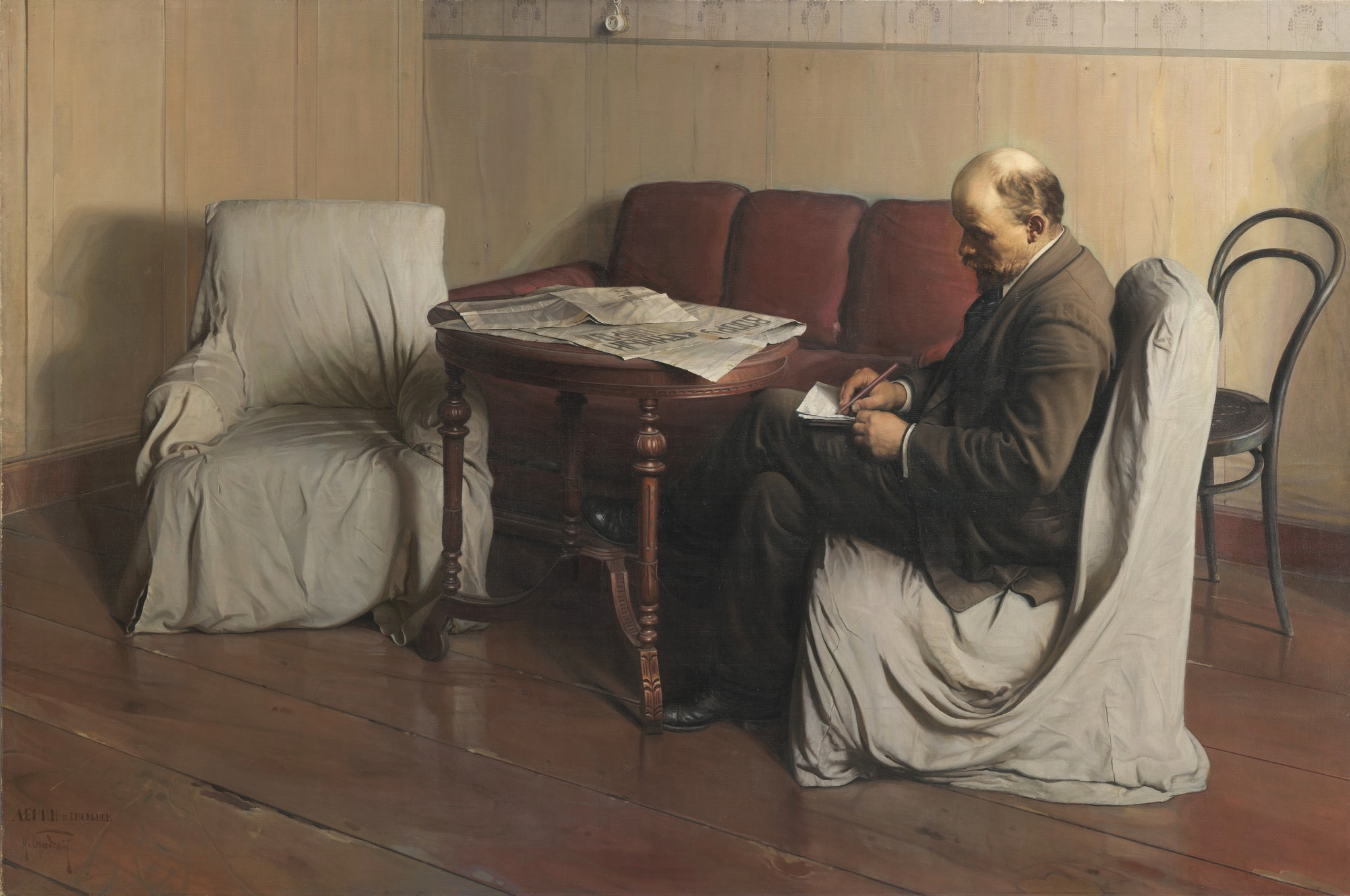
Isaak Brodsky's Lenin in Smolny, 1930. Tretyakov Gallery

Since 1934, the Russian Academy of Arts and Institute of Painting, Sculpture and Architecture were headed by Isaak Brodsky. The consequence of the decree of the Politburo of the Central Committee of the All-Union Communist Party of Bolsheviks was the formation of the Leningrad Union of Soviet Artists, ushering a new era of Soviet art. As the first chairman of the Leningrad Union of Soviet Artists was elected Kuzma Petrov-Vodkin.

Prominent role in the formation of the Leningrad school belongs to famous Russian artists and art educators who worked in Leningrad and those, who, in the past had worked in the St. Petersburg Academy of Arts, having been most notable the students Ilya Repin, Pavel Chistyakov, Arkhip Kuindzhi. And along them, Isaak Brodsky, Dmitry Kardovsky, Alexander Savinov, Kuzma Petrov-Vodkin, Arcady Rylov, Alexander Matveyev, Alexander Osmerkin, Semion Abugov, Eugene Lanceray, Pavel Shillingovsky, Nikolai Radlov, Konstantin Yuon, Pavel Naumov, Boris Ioganson, Alexander Lubimov, Rudolf Frentz, Nikolai Petrov, Vasily Shukhaiev, Dmitry Kiplik, Nikolay Punin, Mikhail Bernshtein, Yefim Cheptsov, Ivan Bilibin, Piotr Buchkin, and others.

The Creation of the new school of painting of Leningrad raised many problems of art education in the post-revolutionary Academy, creating a subject for numerous books, magazines and newspaper articles. The then recent Soviet Revolution had created a new government that needed to form and inspire a new form of art in order to represent the socialist elements that had thus arrived through the revolution, and at the same time to glorify the new social establishments that had come along with the socialist and communist elements that the revolutionary leaders wished to bring. It had then become a problem to create and define a particular Leningrad school of painting and art, as that would undermine the idea of the spirit of a union of soviet republics being united by the same core principles and cultural elements. The development of regional differences would become, at least in principle, controversial for the stated objective of a united state of soviet republics.

"As I could see – wrote Vern G. Swanson – that there were two major schools of Soviet art, the Leningrad School and the Moscow School. A rivalry had developed and there was stiff competition between them, even though the Repin Institute of Painting, Sculpture and Architecture had more prestige. Yet there was something in my outsider's naivete that linked both and the rest of the Soviet School of art together. These included: power and nuance, monumental scale, strong use of 'mother-color', narration of theme, and painterliness. Very little was timid and none were painted with a one-haired brush. It was the academic multi-figure training they received at the Repin or Surikov institutes that undergirded the quality of their work.It was also the "process-oriented" approach, and working directly from life that vouchsafed the significance of their superior working method. They painted life and the human condition with strength, nobility, and perceptiveness."

Alexander Samokhvalov Kirov takes a parade of athletes. 1935. Russian museum

Thus, Vladimir Lenyashin, along with his colleague Vladimir Gusev stated in the Russian Museum: "Of course, it is hardly possible to formulate strictly theoretical features that are specific only to the Leningrad art [school of painting], it is clear that everything in it is inseparable of the common processes of socialist culture. This is, above all – Soviet art! ... But at the same time, with all the difficulties, or rather the impossibility to deduce the "formula" of the Leningrad art, we feel that it exists as an independent, original school." Some researchers have nevertheless attempted to go beyond mere feelings and raised questions about the background and characteristics of the phenomenon. "The Leningrad Art School," wrote art historian Nadezhda Leonova in 1979, "was influenced by complex and sometimes conflicting traditions, but was marked, however, by the combining features of citizenship, humanism and high culture. She was influenced by classical architecture of the city, its literature and theater, a special poetic originality of the urban landscape. While at the same time having a strong influence of the great revolutionary tradition."

In European literature, the term Leningrad School appeared in late 1980 in connection with a well-known series of exhibitions and art auctions of Russian art 'L'École de Leningrad' in France in 1989–1992. In 1994–1997 in St. Petersburg have been several exhibitions of works by artists of the Leningrad school from private collections. In 2007 and 2008 came the first monograph on the history and artistic heritage of the Leningrad school. Creativity by "the leading masters of the Leningrad and Moscow School of Painting" is included in the program of the entrance test for admission to art history in graduate of St. Petersburg State University.

== Representatives ==
The Leningrad School pupils in the prewar and postwar years were well-known painters Evsey Moiseenko, Boris Ugarov, Yuri Neprintsev, Andrei Mylnikov, Alexander Laktionov, Mikhail Trufanov, Yuri Tulin, Vecheslav Zagonek, Piotr Alberti, Taisia Afonina, Evgenia Antipova, Sergei Babkov, Irina Baldina, Andrei Bantikov, Nikolai Baskakov, Leonid Baykov, Evgenia Baykova, Vsevolod Bazhenov, Yuri Belov, Piotr Belousov, Dmitry Belyaev, Zlata Bizova, Olga Bogaevskaya, Lev Bogomolets, Veniamin Borisov, Nikolai Brandt, Dmitry Buchkin, Lev Chegorovsky, Vladimir Chekalov, Nikolai Galakhov, Irina Getmanskaya, Ivan Godlevsky, Vasily Golubev,

Yuri Neprintsev, Rest after Battle, 1951. Tretyakov Gallery

Tatiana Gorb, Vladimir Gorb, Elena Gorokhova, Abram Grushko, Irina Dobrekova, German Yegoshin, Oleg Eremeev, Alexei Eriomin, Sergei Frolov, Mikhail Kaneev, Yuri Khukhrov, Maya Kopitseva, Boris Korneev, Alexander Koroviakov, Victor Korovin, Elena Kostenko, Nikolai Kostrov, Anna Kostrova, Gevork Kotiantz, Mikhail Kozell, Engels Kozlov, Marina Kozlovskaya, Vladimir Krantz, Yaroslav Krestovsky, Valeria Larina, Anatoli Levitin, Boris Lavrenko, Ivan Lavsky, Piotr Litvinsky, Oleg Lomakin, Dmitry Maevsky, Gavriil Malish, Eugene Maltsev, Boris Maluev, Alexei Mozhaev, Valentina Monakhova, Nikolai Mukho, Mikhail Natarevich, Piotr Nazarov, Vera Nazina, Alexander Naumov, Anatoli Nenartovich, Samuil Nevelshtein, Yaroslav Nikolaev, Dmitry Oboznenko, Lev Orekhov, Sergei Osipov, Vecheslav Ovchinnikov, Vladimir Ovchinnikov, Victor Otiev, Filaret Pakun, Genrikh Pavlovsky, Varlen Pen, Boris Petrov, Nikolai Pozdneev, Evgeny Pozdniakov, Stepan Privedentsev, Alexander Pushnin, Semion Rotnitsky, Maria Rudnitskaya, Lev Russov, Galina Rumiantseva, Kapitolina Rumiantseva, Ivan Savenko, Vladimir Sakson, Gleb Savinov, Vladimir Seleznev, Alexander Semionov, Arseny Semionov, Joseph Serebriany, Yuri Shablikin, Boris Shamanov, Alexander Shmidt, Nadezhda Shteinmiller, Elena Skuin, Kim Slavin, Galina Smirnova, Alexander Sokolov, Alexander Stolbov, Alexander Tatarenko, German Tatarinov, Victor Teterin, Nikolai Timkov, Mikhail Tkachev, Leonid Tkachenko, Vitaly Tulenev, Ivan Varichev, Anatoli Vasiliev, Piotr Vasiliev, Valery Vatenin, Igor Veselkin, Nina Veselova, Rostislav Vovkushevsky, Lazar Yazgur, Ruben Zakharian, and many others.

According to S. Ivanov, given in his book The Unknown Socialist Realism. The Leningrad School, its members are some 1,200 artists. In the same edition of the first list of the names given them, based on archival materials, reference works of the Leningrad Union of Artists and exhibition catalogs for the years 1930–1990. Numerous references to the artists belonging to the "Leningrad school" found in the literature of an earlier time. A typical example – an article on art of Efim Lyatsky (1929–1977): "Efim Elmanovich Lyatsky belongs to a generation of artists with whom we have associated the very idea of the Leningrad School of Painting".

== Traditions and heritage ==
Originating in a situation of acute conflict of opinions on how to develop arts and arts education in the USSR, Leningrad school has made a valuable contribution to the restoration and further development of the traditions of national art school and a realistic painting. "Restoring the continuity of traditions of the old school in the walls of the Soviet Academy of Arts, - wrote art historian Olga Rodosskaya, - the preservation of the institution in the same capacity today is certainly a unique phenomenon. Especially in comparison with the general trend of destruction of the traditional European art school". One of its important achievements was the creation in 1930 in Leningrad, the unique system of children's primary and secondary art education, which became soon a model for the whole country. By they works the Leningrad artists have made a significant contribution to the national fine arts, the formation of the aesthetic views and the spiritual world of the modern generations. Its artistic heritage amounts to many thousands of paintings and hundreds of art exhibitions, starting with "1st Exhibition of Leningrad artists" in 1935, who have been important events in the cultural life of an era.

The works of artists of the Leningrad school are well represented in the collections of major museums of Russia, forming the basis of funds domestic painting 1930–1980 period. The work of artists of the Leningrad school has enriched all the genres and directions of modern art. This gave grounds to speak about the traditions and contributions of the Leningrad school in relation to the development of certain genres of painting, in particular, the Leningrad school of landscape painting.

Exhibitions of 1960–1970 period, and, in particular, the retrospective exhibition "The Fine Arts of Leningrad" in 1976 in Moscow, showed that the Leningrad school was held as a major phenomenon of artistic life. It became possible to speak of her traits and characteristics inherent in its pupils and showed up as early as their independent work. As well as its place and role in the development of Soviet art and art school as a whole. They confirmed the gravity of Leningrad artists to create works of great public importance, the culture of professional excellence, to the "typical in Leningrad exquisite harmony of color" and a generalized interest in painting and figurative images. Its representatives were characterized by high artistic culture and the fact that, according to Nikolai Punin, can be called "a sense of the Leningrad painting ... with a sort of deeply honest, clean person deep relationship to the means of expression". At the same properties indicates another authoritative researcher Leo Mochalov in an article on the artist Shishmareva: "Predominant background of her work – rejection of constriction, the inner poise, tact, finally, understanding the nuances of the role – that without which no and can not be true art. These qualities, as well as high professional culture, a thin, well-placed firmly taste associated Shishmareva art with the tradition of the Leningrad painting and graphics "school" of the 1920-1930s." This observation of Shishmareva, which failed (as well as a number of other interesting artists) to obtain formal art education, can fully understand the criteria for identity as a particular artist to the Leningrad School.

Leningrad school featured kinship with progressive traditions of Russian art schools and pre-Soviet period. the Leningrad school remained in close affinity with every progressive phenomenon of pre-soviet art. It stuck to the best examples of Russian and European painting and learnt from the coryphaei of the post-Revolution period. This made the school artistically independent and immune from unimportant momentary outside influences.

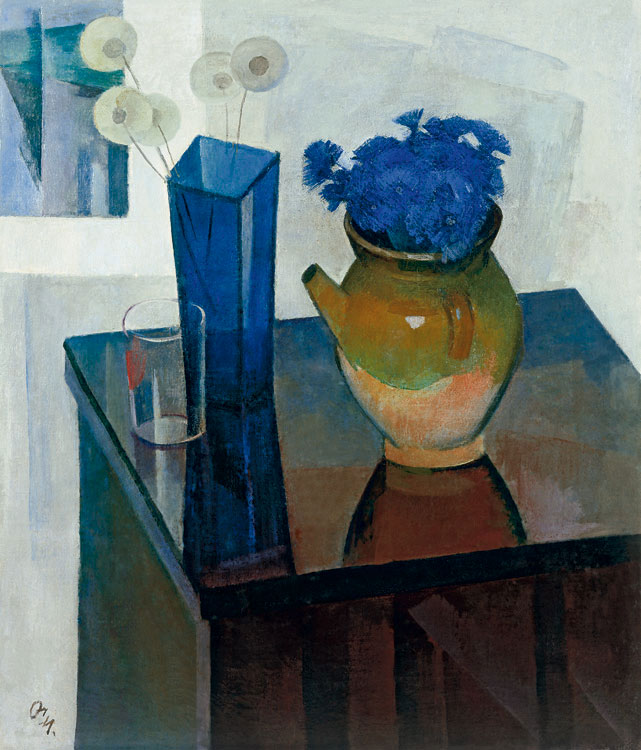
Sergei Osipov's Cornflowers, 1976

With regard to the painterly and plastic language and imagery, the Leningrad school kept to the traditions and general values common to European and Russian art. Ideas of humanism professed by the artists, expressed the national character and the clarity of their culturally informed and quite traditional painterly language made their art highly relevant to the epoch and created a broad field for creative experiments.

The Leningrad school was distinguished by defined professional and moral criteria. This explains the profound skepticism it always felt towards the innovations that often exploited peripheral possibilities of visual art and were generally overestimated. The Leningrad school tended to fuse different art movements and styles but never receded from the Russian traditional understanding of the mission of art.

Another important feature inherited from the old school and St Petersburg tradition was a sincere attentiveness to the informed opinion of the art public. Independent from public authorities and indifferent to ranks and awards, it had a greater influence on the assessment of an artist’s work and personality than official recognition and formal success.

Spreading its traditions and the experience of its founding fathers and adherents all over the country, the Leningrad school itself fed on the heritage and experience of the Moscow art circles and a number of provincial schools. Alexander Savinov and Alexander Matveyev, natives of Saratov, were among the school’s founders; Alexander Osmerkin and Boris Ioganson, who lived in Moscow, were among its most important masters. Later, the influence of the Moscow school became more obvious in the works of those artists whose close co-operation with Moscow-based colleagues was complemented by the fact they were neighbors at the Academic Dacha. This is particularly true about Nikolai Timkov, Maya Kopitseva, and Nikolai Pozdneev who are considered to be among the best Leningrad colorists. The culture of the Saratov school distinguished by its soulful intonation and a particular sincerity is traceable in the works of Vladimir Ovchinnikov and Gleb Savinov.

== Selected paintings ==
- Lenin in Kremlin, by Nikolai Baskakov
- Cafe Gurzuf, by Alexander Samokhvalov
- Quince and Teapot, by Victor Teterin
- House with Arch, by Sergei Osipov
- Portrait of Catherine Balebina, by Lev Russov
- Horsewoman, by Rudolf Frentz
- Spring is on the way, by Vladimir Ovchinnikov
- Spring Day, by Nikolai Pozdneev
- Portrait of Yevgeny Mravinsky, by Lev Russov
- Russian Winter. Hoarfrost, by Nikolai Timkov
- Malaya Sadovaya street, by Alexander Semionov
- Cornflowers, by Sergei Osipov
- Still life with Pussy-Willows, by Taisia Afonina
- Nevsky Prospekt, by Gleb Savinov
- A Midday, by Evgenia Antipova

== See also ==
- Fine Art of Leningrad
- Staraya Ladoga House of Creativity
- List of Russian artists
- List of 20th-century Russian painters
- List of painters of Saint Petersburg Union of Artists
- List of the Russian Landscape painters
- Saint Petersburg Union of Artists
- Academicheskaya Dacha

== Sources ==
- First Exhibition of Leningrad artists. Leningrad, State Russian Museum, 1935.
- The First exhibition of the artists of the Leningrad Front. Catalogue. Leningrad, Voengiz Publishing, 1943.
- Выставка произведений ленинградских художников 1951 года. Каталог. Л., Лениздат, 1951.
- Осенняя выставка произведений ленинградских художников 1956 года. Каталог. Л., Ленинградский художник, 1958.
- 1917–1957. Выставка произведений ленинградских художников. Каталог. Л., Ленинградский художник, 1958.
- Всесоюзная художественная выставка, посвящённая 40-летию Великой Октябрьской социалистической революции. Каталог. М., Советский художник, 1957.
- Выставка произведений ленинградских художников 1960 года. Каталог. Л., Художник РСФСР, 1963.
- Выставка произведений ленинградских художников 1960 года. Каталог. Л., Художник РСФСР, 1961.
- Республиканская художественная выставка "Советская Россия". Каталог. М., Советский художник, 1960.
- Выставка произведений ленинградских художников 1961 года. Каталог. Л., Художник РСФСР, 1964.
- Осенняя выставка произведений ленинградских художников 1962 года. Каталог. Л., Художник РСФСР, 1962.
- Ленинград. Зональная выставка 1964 года. Каталог. Л, Художник РСФСР, 1965.
- Каталог весенней выставки произведений ленинградских художников 1965 года. Л., Художник РСФСР, 1970.
- Вторая республиканская художественная выставка "Советская Россия". Каталог. М., Советский художник, 1965.
- Третья республиканская художественная выставка "Советская Россия". Каталог. М., Министерство культуры РСФСР, 1967.
- Осенняя выставка произведений ленинградских художников 1968 года. Каталог. Л., Художник РСФСР, 1971.
- Наш современник. Каталог выставки произведений ленинградских художников 1971 года. Л., Художник РСФСР, 1972.
- По родной стране. Выставка произведений художников Ленинграда. 50-Летию образования СССР посвящается. Каталог. Л., Художник РСФСР, 1974.
- Наш современник. Зональная выставка произведений ленинградских художников 1975 года. Каталог. Л., Художник РСФСР, 1980.
- Изобразительное искусство Ленинграда. Каталог выставки. Л., Художник РСФСР, 1976.
- Выставка произведений ленинградских художников, посвящённая 60-летию Великого Октября. Л., Художник РСФСР, 1982.
- Art belongs to people. Exhibition of works by artists of Leningrad. Leningrad: Khudozhnik RSFSR, 1979.
- Directory of members of the Union of Artists of USSR. Volume 1,2. – Moscow: Soviet artist, 1979.
- Зональная выставка произведений ленинградских художников 1980 года. Каталог. Л., Художник РСФСР, 1983.
- В. Гусев, В. Леняшин. Ленинградскому изобразительному искусству шестьдесят лет // Изобразительное искусство Ленинграда. Л., Художник РСФСР, 1981. С.13-19.
- Л. Мочалов. Некоторые проблемы развития ленинградского искусства // Изобразительное искусство Ленинграда. Л., Художник РСФСР, 1981. С.415-422.
- Л. Яковлева. Ленинградская живопись. История и современность // Изобразительное искусство Ленинграда. Л., Художник РСФСР, 1981. С.427-431.
- В. Плотников. Некоторые аспекты ленинградской критики и художественного процесса // Изобразительное искусство Ленинграда. Л., Художник РСФСР, 1981. С.422-427.
- Н. Василевская. Ленинградская школа художественного стекла // Изобразительное искусство Ленинграда. Л., Художник РСФСР, 1981. С.451-457.
- Directory of members of the Leningrad branch of Union of Artists of Russian Federation. – Leningrad: Khudozhnik RSFSR, 1987.
- L' École de Leningrad. Catalogue. Paris, Drouot Richelieu, 16 June 1989.
- L' École de Leningrad. Catalogue. Paris, Drouot Richelieu, 27 November 1989.
- L' École de Leningrad. Catalogue. Paris, Drouot Richelieu, 12 Mars 1990.
- Lyakhovitsky Alexander, Makhlina Svetlana. Sergei Osipov. Painting. Drawing. Exhibition of works. Catalogue. – Leningrad, Khudozhnik RSFSR, 1990. C. 5.
- L' École de Leningrad. Catalogue. Paris, Drouot Richelieu, 11 June 1990.
- L' École de Leningrad. Catalogue. Paris, Drouot Richelieu, 21 December 1990.
- Painture Russe. Catalogue. Paris, Drouot Richelieu, 18 February 1991.
- Painture Russe. Catalogue. Paris, Drouot Richelieu, 26 April 1991.
- Leningrad figuration. Catalogue. Paris, Drouot Richelieu, 10 June 1991.
- Sots'Art a St Petersbourg. Catalogue. St Germain en Laye, 23 Fevrier 1992.
- Ленинградские художники. Живопись 1950–1980 годов. Каталог. СПб., 1994.
- Saint-Pétersbourg – Pont-Audemer. Dessins, Gravures, Sculptures et Tableaux du XX siècle du fonds de L' Union des Artistes de Saint-Pétersbourg. Pont-Audemer, 1994.
- Этюд в творчестве ленинградских художников. Выставка произведений. Каталог. СПб., 1994.
- Лирика в произведениях художников военного поколения. Выставка произведений. Каталог. СПб., 1995. С.6.
- Живопись 1940–1990 годов. Ленинградская школа. Выставка произведений. СПб., 1996.
- Link of Times: 1932–1997. Artists – Members of Saint Petersburg Union of Artists of Russia. Exhibition catalogue. – Saint Petersburg: Manezh Central Exhibition Hall, 1997.
- Still-Life in Painting of 1940-1990s. The Leningrad School. Exhibition catalogue. Saint Petersburg, Nikolai Nekrasov Memorial museum, 1997.
- Matthew C. Bown. Dictionary of 20th Century Russian and Soviet Painters 1900-1980s. – London: Izomar 1998. ISBN 0-9532061-0-6, ISBN 978-0-9532061-0-0.
- Yefim Lyatsky. Painting. Exhibition Catalogue. St. Petersburg, 1998.
- The Seasons of Timkov. Master Russian Impressionist. - The Pushkin Collection, 1998.
- Vern G. Swanson. Soviet Impressionism. – Woodbridge, England: Antique Collectors' Club, 2001. - p. 29,47. ISBN 1-85149-280-1, ISBN 978-1-85149-280-0.
- Mochalov Leo. A Walk of natural nobility ... // Petersburg art history notebook. Vol. 3. St. Petersburg, 2001. P. 3-7.
- Time for change. The Art of 1960–1985 in the Soviet Union. - Saint Petersburg: State Russian Museum, 2006.
- Anniversary Directory graduates of Saint Petersburg State Academic Institute of Painting, Sculpture, and Architecture named after Ilya Repin, Russian Academy of Arts. 1915–2005. - Saint Petersburg: Pervotsvet Publishing, 2007. ISBN 978-5-903677-01-6.
- Sergei V. Ivanov. Unknown Socialist Realism. The Leningrad School. Saint Petersburg, NP-Print Edition, 2007. ISBN 5-901724-21-6, ISBN 978-5-901724-21-7.
- Strukova A. I. The Leningrad school of landscape painting and its masters. 1930 – first half of 1940. Abstract PhD thesis. Moscow, 2008.
- Vern G. Swanson. Soviet Impressionist Painting. Woodbridge, England, Antique Collectors' Club, 2008. ISBN 1-85149-549-5, ISBN 978-1-85149-549-8.
- Pishny Igor. The Leningrad school of painting. Socialist Realism of 1930-1980s. Selected names. St. Petersburg, Kolomenskaya Versta Publishing, 2008. ISBN 978-5-91555-005-5.
- Manin Vitaly. Art and Power. Fighting trends in Soviet art 1917–1941 period. St. Petersburg, Aurora Publishing, 2008.
- Rodosskaya Olga. Academy of Fine Arts in 1920–1930 years. // Dialog of Arts Magazine, Vol. 5, 2008. P. 6-13.
- Mitrokhina Ludmila, Kirillova Larisa. A History of the Leningrad Secondary Art School // St. Petersburg Art History notebook. Vol. 16. St. Petersburg, 2009. P.48-69.
- Romanycheva Irina. Academic Dacha. The history and tradition. St. Petersburg, Petropolis, 2009.
- Suris Boris. Nikolai F. Lapshin// Pages of Memory. Reference Memorial digest. Artists of the Leningrad Union of Soviet artists, who were killed during the Great Patriotic War and the Siege of Leningrad. St. Petersburg, 2010. P.136-139.
- Dmitry Belyaev// Almanac. Vol. 293. St. Petersburg: Palace Editions, 2010. ISBN 978-5-93332-359-4.
- Matveeva Olga. The Leningrad School of Painting // Proceedings of the XVIII International Conference "Lomonosov-2011". Moscow, MAKC Press, 2011. ISBN 978-5-317-03634-8
- Danilova Anna. Formation of the Leningrad school of painting and its artistic traditions// St. Petersburg Art History notebook. Issue 21. Saint Petersburg, 2011. P.94—105.
- Струкова А. И. Ленинградская пейзажная школа. 1930-1940-е годы. М., Галарт. 2011. ISBN 978-5-269-01112-7.
- Иванов С. В. Ленинградская школа и критика концепции "третьего пути" // Петербургские искусствоведческие тетради. Вып.27. Санкт-Петербург, 2013. С.267-276.
- Иванов С. В. К вопросу о ленинградской школе живописи // Петербургские искусствоведческие тетради. Вып.28. Санкт-Петербург, 2013. С.229-236.
- Anatoly F. Dmitrenko, Ruslan A. Bakhtiyarov. The Leningrad School and the Realistic Tradition of Russian Painting // The Leningrad School of Painting. Essays on the History. St Petersburg, ARKA Gallery Publishing, 2019. С.58—65.
