= Victor Teterin =

Russian painter (1922 – 1991)

- Born: Victor Kuzmich Teterin; 25 October 1922; Bakharevo, Tver Province, Soviet Russia
- Died: 1 October 1991 (aged 68); Leningrad
- Education: Repin Institute of Arts
- Known for: Painting
- Movement: Realism

Victor Kuzmich Teterin (Russian: Ви́ктор Кузьми́ч Тете́рин; 25 October 1922 – 1 October 1991) was a Russian painter, watercolorist, and art teacher, who lived and worked in Leningrad. He is regarded as one of the important representatives of the Leningrad School of Painting.

== Biography ==
Teterin was born on 25 October 1922 in Bakharevo village, Tver Province. Since 1930, together with his parents, he lived in Leningrad. His father worked in ship repair shops, and his mother was a dressmaker, she engaged in the upbringing of children, and housekeeping.

Quince and Teapot. 1966

In 1937–1940, Teterin was engaged in the famous art studio at the Leningrad Palace of Pioneers, where he studied with the famous artist and teacher, a disciple of Ilya Repin, Alfred Eberling. In 1940, he entered the Leningrad Secondary Art School under All-Russian Academy of Arts, where he studied under Pavel Naumov, Mikhail Natarevich, and Olga Bogaevskaya. After the beginning of the Great Patriotic War, he remained in Leningrad. In February 1942, together with the Secondary Art School and the Academy of Arts, he was evacuated from blockaded Leningrad to Samarkand.

In 1944, Victor Teterin entered the first course in the Department of Painting at the Leningrad Institute of Painting, Sculpture and Architecture named after Ilya Repin, where he studied under Alexander Osmerkin, Semion Abugov, Genrikh Pavlovsky, and Gleb Savinov.

In 1949, he graduated from the Ilya Repin Institute in Mikhail Avilov workshop, together with Rostislav Vovkushevsky, Ivan Godlevsky, Valery Pimenov, Maria Rudnitskaya, and other young artists. His graduation work was a historical painting titled "Stalin at exile in Narym".

Since 1949, Teterin participated in art exhibitions. He painted portraits, landscapes, genre compositions, worked in oils, tempera, and watercolors. From 1949 to 1956, he taught painting and drawing at the Leningrad Higher School of Industrial Art, named after Vera Mukhina. Among his best known paintings of the 1950s there were "At the Kazan Cathedral" (1949), "Harvesting", "A Winter in Pavlovsk" (both 1950), "A Portrait of Wife in Yellow Dress", "Still Life", "Landscape in Gurzuf" (all 1953), "Portrait of a Mother behind a Sewing Machine", "Sredny Prospekt of the Vasilievsky Island", "Portrait of a Man" (all 1954), "Still Life" (1955), "Peaches and Pears" (1956), "In front of May", "Autumn Bouquet" (both 1957), "Quince and Grapes", "Apple Tree Branch", "A Working Lad" (all 1958), "In Sunny Day", "Road Builders" (both 1959), and others.

According to art critics, the peak of Teterin's creative work occurred during the 1960s and 1970s. Among his well-known paintings of this period were "My Parents", "Quince and Teapot", "The End of the Summer", "Southern Still Life", "Olive Grove", "House with Balconies" (all 1966), "Still Life with Rose", "A Spring. View of the Smolenka River" (both 1968), "Olives", "Sredne Podyacheskaya Street" (both 1969), "Red Poppies", "Pears and Pomegranates" (both 1975), "Still life with a Dog Rose" (1977), "Blue Balcony", "Callas" (both 1978), "A Girl in a Lilac Dress", "A Girl on the windowsill", "Peonies" (all 1979), and others.

Among his last paintings were "Naked" (1981), "Toilet" (1982), "Apples, a Bottle and a Basket" (1983), "Still life with a Spanish Jug" (1985), "Sea shore in Gurzuf", "Table Tennis" (both 1985), and others.

His solo exhibitions were held in Leningrad in 1966 and 1988, and in Saint Petersburg in 1999. During the 1960s and 1970s, Teterin become one of the leaders of the "left wing" of the Leningrad Union of Artists, of which he had been a member since 1953. In 1972, together with his wife, Evgenia Antipova, he took part in the famous Exhibition of the Eleven Artists.

Victor Kuzmich Teterin died in Leningrad in 1991. His paintings are held in the State Russian Museum, State Tretyakov Gallery, and in art museums and private collections in Russia, France, Germany, in the US, England, Japan, and other countries.

== See also ==
- Quince and Teapot (painting)
- Fine Art of Leningrad
- Leningrad School of Painting
- List of Russian artists
- List of 20th-century Russian painters
- List of painters of Saint Petersburg Union of Artists
- List of the Russian Landscape painters
- Saint Petersburg Union of Artists

== Sources ==
- Центральный Государственный Архив литературы и искусства. СПб. Ф.78. Оп.8. Д.457.
- Львов Е. Таланты одной школы // Смена, 1940, 28 февраля.
- Выставка произведений ленинградских художников 1951 года. Каталог. М-Л., Искусство, 1951. С.48.
- Весенняя выставка произведений ленинградских художников 1953 года. Каталог. Л., ЛССХ, 1953. С.8.
- Весенняя выставка произведений ленинградских художников 1953 года. Каталог. Л., Ленинградский Союз советских художников, 1953. С.8.
- Весенняя выставка произведений ленинградских художников 1954 года. Каталог. Л., Изогиз, 1954. С.19.
- Осенняя выставка произведений ленинградских художников. 1956 года. Каталог. Л., Ленинградский художник, 1958. С.23.
- Выставка живописи, скульптуры, графики к Первому Всесоюзному съезду советских художников. Каталог. М., Оргкомитет Союза советских художников, 1957.
- 1917 — 1957. Выставка произведений ленинградских художников. Каталог. Л., Ленинградский художник, 1958. С.31.
- Передвижная выставка произведений ленинградских художников. Каталог. Мурманск, ЛССХ, 1957.
- Всесоюзная художественная выставка, посвященная 40-летию Великой Октябрьской социалистической революции. Каталог. М., Советский художник, 1957. С.78.
- Выставка произведений ленинградских художников 1960 года. Каталог. Л., Художник РСФСР, 1963. С.18.
- Выставка произведений ленинградских художников 1960 года. Каталог. Л., Художник РСФСР, 1961. С.41.
- Выставка произведений ленинградских художников 1961 года. Каталог. Л., Художник РСФСР, 1964. С.39.
- Осенняя выставка произведений ленинградских художников 1962 года. Каталог. Л., Художник РСФСР, 1962. С.26.
- Ленинград. Зональная выставка. Л., Художник РСФСР, 1965. С.54-55.
- Молдавский Д. «Ленинград». На зональных художественных выставках // Литературная Россия, 1964, 27 ноября.
- Никифоровская И. У художников весна // Ленинградская правда, 1965, 19 июня.
- Третья республиканская художественная выставка «Советская Россия». Каталог. М., Министерство культуры РСФСР, 1967. С.56.
- Каталог произведений художников Российской Федерации, переданных в дар организациям и учреждениям культуры (1963—1971 гг.). М., СХ РСФСР, 1972. С.111.
- По родной стране. Выставка произведений художников Ленинграда. 50 Летию образования СССР посвящается. Каталог. Л., Художник РСФСР, 1974. С.25.
- Арбузов Г. С мыслью о родине // Ленинградская правда, 1972, 10 октября.
- Каталог выставки одиннадцати ленинградских художников. Л., Художник РСФСР, 1976.
- Наш современник. Зональная выставка произведений ленинградских художников 1975 года. Каталог. Л., Художник РСФСР, 1980. С.25.
- Изобразительное искусство Ленинграда. Каталог выставки. Л., Художник РСФСР, 1976. С.32.
- Выставка произведений ленинградских художников, посвященная 60-летию Великого Октября. Л., Художник РСФСР, 1982. С.22.
- Справочник членов Союза художников СССР. Т.2. М., Советский художник, 1979. С.424.
- Зональная выставка произведений ленинградских художников 1980 года. Каталог. Л., Художник РСФСР, 1983. С.24.
- Выставки советского изобразительного искусства. Справочник. Т.5. 1954—1958 гг. М., Советский художник, 1981. С.26, 28, 122, 260, 342, 378, 387, 421.
- Мочалов Л. Виктор Тетерин. Л., Художник РСФСР, 1982.
- Мы побратимы — сохраним мир. Третья совместная выставка произведений художников Ленинграда и Дрездена. Дрезден, 1986. С.207.
- Directory of members of the Leningrad branch of Union of Artists of Russian Federation. Leningrad., Khudozhnik RSFSR, 1987. P.130.
- Виктор Кузьмич Тетерин. Выставка произведений. Каталог. Л., Художник РСФСР, 1988.
- Выставка произведений 26 ленинградских и московских художников. Каталог. Л., Художник РСФСР, 1990. С.36-37, 51–52.
- Лирика в произведениях художников военного поколения. Выставка произведений. Каталог. СПб., 1995. С.6.
- Памяти учителя. Выставка петербургских художников — учеников мастерской А. А. Осмеркина. СПб., 1997. С.4,5.
- Связь времен. 1932—1997. Художники — члены Санкт—Петербургского Союза художников России. Каталог выставки. СПб., 1997. С.299.
- Matthew C. Bown. Dictionary of 20th Century Russian and Soviet Painters 1900-1980s. - London: Izomar, 1998. ISBN 0-9532061-0-6, ISBN 978-0-9532061-0-0.
- Евгения Антипова, Виктор Тетерин. Живопись. Рисунок. СПб., 1999.
- Художники круга 11-ти. Из коллекции Николая Кононихина. СПб., 2001. С.3.
- Sergei V. Ivanov. Unknown Socialist Realism. The Leningrad School. Saint Petersburg, NP-Print Edition, 2007. PP.9, 15, 20, 21, 24, 370, 388, 390, 391, 399, 401, 403–406, 439, 442, 445. ISBN 5-901724-21-6, ISBN 978-5-901724-21-7.
- Anniversary Directory graduates of Saint Petersburg State Academic Institute of Painting, Sculpture, and Architecture named after Ilya Repin, Russian Academy of Arts. 1915 - 2005. Saint Petersburg, Pervotsvet Publishing House, 2007. P.61. ISBN 978-5-903677-01-6.
- Данилова А. Группа одиннадцати как художественное явление в изобразительном искусстве Ленинграда 1960—1980 годов // Общество. Среда. Развитие. Научно-теоретический журнал. No. 3, 2010. С.160-164.
- Традиции школы живописи государственной художественно-промышленной академии имени А. Л. Штиглица. Кафедра общей живописи. — СПб., 2010. С.15, 271.
- Иванов С. Тихая жизнь за ленинградским столом // Петербургские искусствоведческие тетради. Выпуск 23. СПб., 2012. С.90-97.
- Логвинова Е. Круглый стол по ленинградскому искусству в галерее АРКА // Петербургские искусствоведческие тетради. Вып. 31. СПб, 2014. С.17-26.
