= Konstantin Simun =

Russian sculptor (1934–2019)

- Born: Konstantin Michailovich Simun; 6 April 1934 (Soviet Union) Leningrad, USSR
- Died: 4 September 2019 (aged 85)
- Education: Repin Institute, St. Petersburg, Russia
- Known for: Sculpture, drawing, painting
- Awards: Lenin Peace Prize 1962

Konstantin Simun (6 April 1934 – 4 September 2019) was a Russian sculptor living and working in Boston, United States. He was born in Saint Petersburg, Russia in 1934. He is most well known for his large-scale monuments, including "Broken Ring", a monument to the "Road of Life" on Lake Ladoga, near Saint Petersburg, and "Totem America," exhibited for a decade at DeCordova Museum and Sculpture Park. He was a recipient of awards from the International Dyagilev Prize "For Devotion to Art", the Ludwig Vogelstein Foundation, and the Pollack-Krasner Foundation.

== Biography ==
Konstantin Simun was born in Leningrad, USSR, in 1934. He studied sculpture at the secondary school of arts at the I.Repin Art Institute (Leningrad), then at the Tallinn Art Institute (Estonia), and from 1953 to 1957 at the I. Repin institute of Painting, Sculpture and Architecture.

In 1958 he became a member of the Artists' Union of the USSR.

From 1988 until his death in 2019 he lived in the US.

Simun created numerous works which were widely exhibited throughout Russia and the United States. He was the creator of the 1966 monument "Broken Ring" on Lake Ladoga (near St. Petersburg, Russia), which brought him international recognition, and is acknowledged as one of the most significant memorials of World War II.

Simun's works are in the permanent collections of Russia's largest museums, such as the State Tretyakov Gallery in Moscow, the State Russian Museum in St. Petersburg, and the Perm Gallery in Perm, as well as in private collections.

His work "Totem: America" was exhibited at the DeCordova Museum and Sculpture Park in Lincoln, Massachusetts, from 1993 to 2002, and brought him great popularity in the US.

He was the creator of the memorial to puppeteer I. Fokin installed in Harvard Square, Cambridge, Massachusetts in 2001.

== See also ==
- Collections of the Russian State Museum
- Harvard Square
- Leningrad Blockade
