= German Yegoshin =

Russian painter (1931–2009)

German Pavlovich Yegoshin
- Born: April 8, 1931; Leningrad, USSR
- Died: October 2, 2009 (aged 78); Saint Petersburg, Russia
- Education: Repin Institute of Arts
- Known for: Painting
- Movement: Realism

German Pavlovich Yegoshin (Russian: Герман Павлович Егошин) (April 4, 1931 – October 2, 2009) was a Russian and Soviet painter and art educator, an Honored Artist of the Russian Federation, who lived and worked in Saint Petersburg (former Leningrad). He was a member of the Leningrad Union of Soviet Artists, and was regarded as one of the representatives of the Leningrad School of Painting.

== Biography ==
German Pavlovich Yegoshin was born in Leningrad on April 4, 1931. From 1949 to 1950 he studied in Tavricheskaya Art school, and in 1950 to 1953 in Secondary Art School. From 1953 to 1959 he studied on Department of Paintings of the Repin Institute of Arts, as a pupil of Boris Ioganson.

In 1959 he began to participate in art exhibitions. He painted portraits, genre composition, landscapes, and still lifes. In 1961 he was admitted to the Leningrad Union of Soviet Artists. FromIn 1960-1970, Yegoshin taught at the art college and the Vera Mukhina Art Institute.

Yegoshin died aged 78 in Saint Petersburg on October 2, 2009. His paintings reside in the Russian Museum, the Tretyakov Gallery and in art museums and private collections in Russia, Ukraine, Japan, Germany, France, and other countries.

== See also ==
- Leningrad School of Painting
- List of Russian artists
- List of 20th-century Russian painters
- List of painters of Saint Petersburg Union of Artists
- Saint Petersburg Union of Artists

== Sources ==
- Выставка произведений ленинградских художников 1960 года. Каталог. Л., Художник РСФСР, 1963. С.9.
- Выставка произведений ленинградских художников 1960 года. Каталог. Л., Художник РСФСР, 1961. С.16.
- Выставка произведений ленинградских художников 1961 года. Каталог. Л., Художник РСФСР, 1964. С.16.
- Дмитренко А., Фёдорова Н. А где же молодость? О «Выставке молодых». // Смена, 1966, 11 ноября.
- Весенняя выставка произведений ленинградских художников 1969 года. Каталог. Л., Художник РСФСР, 1970. C.10.
- Губарев А., Дмитренко А. В простом, казалось бы, мотиве ... // Вечерний Ленинград, 1971, 5 января.
- Каталог Осенней выставки произведений ленинградских художников 1971 года. — Л: Художник РСФСР, 1973. — с.7.
- Богданов А. Ярче показывать жизнь. // Вечерний Ленинград, 1971, 21 декабря.
- Вьюнова И. Мерой времени. // Ленинградская правда, 1971, 31 декабря.
- Богданов А. Ярче, но и глубже. // Вечерний Ленинград, 1973, 25 декабря.
- Каталог выставки одиннадцати ленинградских художников. — Л: Художник РСФСР, 1976.
- Наш современник. Зональная выставка произведений ленинградских художников 1975 года. Каталог. Л., Художник РСФСР, 1980. C.15.
- Справочник членов Союза художников СССР. Том 1. — М: Советский художник, 1979. — с.356.
- Герман Павлович Егошин. Выставка произведений. Каталог. — Л: Художник РСФСР, 1981.
- Левандовский С. Живопись на Ленинградской зональной // Искусство. 1981, № 2. С.64.
- Шевчук С. Смотреть жизни в лицо. Заметки о живописном разделе выставки ленинградских художников в Манеже. // Смена, 1983, 28 декабря.
- Мы побратимы — сохраним мир. Третья совместная выставка произведений художников Ленинграда и Дрездена. — Дрезден: Бюро изобразительных искусств окружного совета Дрездена, 1986. — с.130,205.
- Справочник членов Ленинградской организации Союза художников РСФСР. — Л: Художник РСФСР, 1987. — с.41.
- Выставка произведений 26 ленинградских и московских художников. Каталог. — Л: Художник РСФСР, 1990. — с.24-25.
- Связь времен. 1932—1997. Художники — члены Санкт — Петербургского Союза художников России. Каталог выставки. — Санкт-Петербург: ЦВЗ «Манеж», 1997. — с.287.
- Matthew Cullerne Bown. A Dictionary of Twentieth Century Russian And Soviet Painters. 1900 — 1980s. — London: Izomar Limited, 1998.
- Художники круга 11-ти. Из коллекции Николая Кононихина. — СПб, Мемориальный музей Н. А. Некрасова, 2001. С.3.
- Художники — городу. Выставка к 70-летию Санкт-Петербургского Союза художников. Каталог. — Санкт-Петербург: Петрополь, 2003. — с.180.
- Время перемен. Искусство 1960—1985 в Советском Союзе. — Санкт-Петербург: Государственный Русский музей, 2006. C.224, 393.
- Sergei V. Ivanov. Unknown Socialist Realism. The Leningrad School. Saint Petersburg, NP-Print Edition, 2007. P.9, 21, 397, 399—402, 405—407, 444. ISBN 5-901724-21-6, ISBN 978-5-901724-21-7.
- Юбилейный Справочник выпускников Санкт-Петербургского академического института живописи, скульптуры и архитектуры имени И. Е. Репина Российской Академии художеств. 1915—2005. — Санкт Петербург: «Первоцвет», 2007. — с.82.
- Данилова А. Группа одиннадцати как художественное явление в изобразительном искусстве Ленинграда 1960—1980 годов.//Общество. Среда. Развитие. Научно-теоретический журнал. № 3, 2010. С.160-164.
