= 1980 in fine arts of the Soviet Union =

The year 1980 was marked by many events that left an imprint on the history of Soviet and Russian Fine Arts.

== Events ==
- April 14 — Exhibition of works by Leningrad artists, dedicated to Vladimir Lenin 110-year Anniversary was opened in the Central Exhibition Hall «Manezh». Over 1500 works of artists were exhibited. The participants were Nikolai Babasuk, Igor Veselkin, Larisa Kiryllova, Elena Kostenko, Boris Lavrenko, Oleg Lomakin, Boris Maluev, Ivan Penteshin, Gleb Savinov, Leonid Fokin, Andrei Yakovlev, and other important Leningrad artists

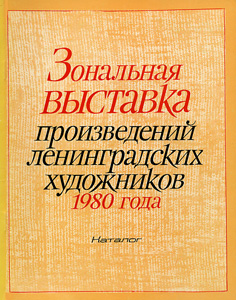
Exhibition Catalog

- September 10 — Regional Exhibition of works by Leningrad artists of 1980 was opened in the Central Exhibition Hall «Manezh». The participants were Evgenia Antipova, Taisia Afonina, Leonid Baykov, Vsevolod Bazhenov, Irina Baldina, Nikolai Baskakov, Piotr Belousov, Dmitry Belyaev, Zlata Bizova, Olga Bogaevskaya, Lev Bogomolets, Veniamin Borisov, Dmitry Buchkin, Lev Chegorovsky, Evgeny Chuprun, Nikolai Galakhov, Ivan Godlevsky, Vasily Golubev, Elena Gorokhova, Abram Grushko, Irina Dobrekova, Oleg Eremeev, Alexei Eriomin, Mikhail Kaneev, Yuri Khukhrov, Maya Kopitseva, Boris Korneev, Victor Korovin, Elena Kostenko, Nikolai Kostrov, Anna Kostrova, Gevork Kotiantz, Mikhail Kozell, Marina Kozlovskaya, Engels Kozlov, Vladimir Krantz, Yaroslav Krestovsky, Valeria Larina, Boris Lavrenko, Anatoli Levitin, Oleg Lomakin, Vladimir Malevsky, Gavriil Malish, Eugene Maltsev, Boris Maluev, Yuri Mezhirov, Evsey Moiseenko, Nikolai Mukho, Andrei Mylnikov, Vera Nazina, Anatoli Nenartovich, Yuri Neprintsev, Samuil Nevelshtein, Dmitry Oboznenko, Victor Oreshnikov, Sergei Osipov, Lia Ostrova, Victor Otiev, Vladimir Ovchinnikov, Vyacheslav Ovchinnikov, Filaret Pakun, Yuri Pavlov, Varlen Pen, Boris Petrov, Stepan Privedentsev, Alexander Pushnin, Valentina Rakhina, Semion Rotnitsky, Galina Rumiantseva, Kapitolina Rumiantseva, Lev Russov, Vladimir Sakson, Ivan Savenko, Gleb Savinov, Vladimir Seleznev, Arseny Semionov, Yuri Shablikin, Boris Shamanov, Alexander Shmidt, Nadezhda Shteinmiller, Elena Skuin, Kim Slavin, Galina Smirnova, Alexander Stolbov, Victor Teterin, Nikolai Timkov, Leonid Tkachenko, Mikhail Trufanov, Yuri Tulin, Vitaly Tulenev, Boris Ugarov, Ivan Varichev, Anatoli Vasiliev, Valery Vatenin, Igor Veselkin, Lazar Yazgur, German Yegoshin, Vecheslav Zagonek, Ruben Zakharian, and other important Leningrad artists.
- The Six All-Russian Republican Art Exhibition named «Soviet Russia» was opened in Moscow. The participants were Nikolai Baskakov, Piotr Belousov, Dmitry Belajev, Olga Bogaevskaya, Mikhail Kaneev, Maya Kopitseva, Engels Kozlov, Marina Kozlovskaya, Yaroslav Krestovsky, Boris Lavrenko, Oleg Lomakin, Evsey Moiseenko, Yuri Neprintsev, Samuil Nevelshtein, Dmitry Oboznenko, Sergei Osipov, Ivan Savenko, Gleb Savinov, Victor Teterin, Nikolai Timkov, Vitaly Tulenev, Ivan Varichev, Vecheslav Zagonek, and other important artists.
- Exhibition of works by Vladimir Tokarev was opened in the Leningrad Union of Artists.
- Exhibition of works by Ludmila Ronchevskaya was opened in the Leningrad Union of Artists.

== Deaths ==
- March 15 — Abram Grushko (Russian: Грушко Абрам Борисович), Russian soviet painter and art educator (b. 1918).
- May 18 — Semion Chuykov, (Russian: Чуйков Семён Афанасьевич), Russian soviet painter, People's Artist of the USSR, Stalin Prize winner (b. 1902).
- July 5 — Alexander Tyshler (Russian: Тышлер Александр Григорьевич), soviet painter, graphic artist, and theatre artist, Stalin Prize winner (b. 1898).

== See also ==
- List of Russian artists
- List of painters of Leningrad Union of Artists
- Saint Petersburg Union of Artists
- Russian culture

== Sources ==
- Громов Н. Тема вечная, современная // Вечерний Ленинград, 1980, 14 апреля.
- Молодость страны Советов. Живопись. Скульптура. Л., Государственный Русский музей, 1980.
- Шестая республиканская художественная выставка «Советская Россия». Каталог. М., Советский художник, 1980.
- Токарев Владимир Федорович. Каталог выставки. Л., Художник РСФСР, 1980.
- Зональная выставка произведений ленинградских художников 1980 года. Каталог. Л., Художник РСФСР, 1983.
- Рончевская Людмила Алексеевна. Выставка произведений. Каталог. Л., Художник РСФСР, 1980.
- Володимиров Николай Николаевич. Выставка произведений. Каталог. Л., Художник РСФСР, 1980.
- Выставка произведений ленинградских художников Елены Гороховой, Петра Литвинского, Владимира Максимихина, Ростислава Пинкавы, Тамары Полосатовой, Александра Столбова, Юрия Шаблыкина. Живопись. Каталог. Л., Художник РСФСР, 1980.
- Владимир Александрович Андреев. Выставка произведений. Каталог. Л., Художник РСФСР, 1980.
- Artists of Peoples of the USSR. Biography Dictionary. Vol. 1. Moscow, Iskusstvo, 1970.
- Artists of Peoples of the USSR. Biography Dictionary. Vol. 2. Moscow, Iskusstvo, 1972.
- Directory of Members of Union of Artists of USSR. Volume 1,2. Moscow, Soviet Artist Edition, 1979.
- Directory of Members of the Leningrad branch of the Union of Artists of Russian Federation. Leningrad, Khudozhnik RSFSR, 1980.
- Artists of Peoples of the USSR. Biography Dictionary. Vol. 4 Book 1. Moscow, Iskusstvo, 1983.
- Directory of Members of the Leningrad branch of the Union of Artists of Russian Federation. – Leningrad: Khudozhnik RSFSR, 1987.
- Artists of peoples of the USSR. Biography Dictionary. Vol. 4 Book 2. – Saint Petersburg: Academic project humanitarian agency, 1995.
- Link of Times: 1932 – 1997. Artists – Members of Saint Petersburg Union of Artists of Russia. Exhibition catalogue. – Saint Petersburg: Manezh Central Exhibition Hall, 1997.
- Matthew C. Bown. Dictionary of 20th Century Russian and Soviet Painters 1900-1980s. – London: Izomar, 1998.
- Vern G. Swanson. Soviet Impressionism. – Woodbridge, England: Antique Collectors' Club, 2001.
- Петр Фомин. Живопись. Воспоминания современников. СПб., 2002. С.107.
- Время перемен. Искусство 1960—1985 в Советском Союзе. СПб., Государственный Русский музей, 2006.
- Sergei V. Ivanov. Unknown Socialist Realism. The Leningrad School. – Saint-Petersburg: NP-Print Edition, 2007. – ISBN 5-901724-21-6, ISBN 978-5-901724-21-7.
- Anniversary Directory graduates of Saint Petersburg State Academic Institute of Painting, Sculpture, and Architecture named after Ilya Repin, Russian Academy of Arts. 1915 – 2005. – Saint Petersburg: Pervotsvet Publishing House, 2007.
