= 1960 in fine arts of the Soviet Union =

The year 1960 was marked by many events that left an imprint on the history of Soviet and Russian Fine Arts.

== Events ==
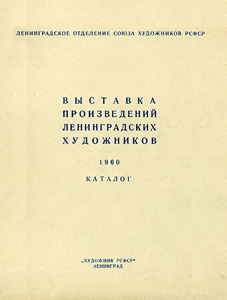
Exhibition Catalogue

- Annual Exhibition of works by Leningrad artists of 1960 was opened in Exhibition Halls of the Leningrad Union of Artists. The participants were Taisia Afonina, Piotr Alberti, Evgenia Antipova, Genrikh Bagrov, Leonid Baykov, Vsevolod Bazhenov, Nikolai Baskakov, Zlata Bizova, Olga Bogaevskaya, Lev Bogomolets, Nikolai Galakhov, Vladimir Gorb, Abram Grushko, German Egoshin, Alexei Eriomin, Mikhail Kaneev, Maria Kleschar-Samokhvalova, Boris Korneev, Alexander Koroviakov, Victor Korovin, Elena Kostenko, Nikolai Kostrov, Anna Kostrova, Gevork Kotiantz, Mikhail Kozell, Marina Kozlovskaya, Yaroslav Krestovsky, Boris Lavrenko, Ivan Lavsky, Oleg Lomakin, Dmitry Maevsky, Vladimir Malevsky, Alexei Mozhaev, Evsey Moiseenko, Nikolai Mukho, Andrei Mylnikov, Piotr Nazarov, Vera Nazina, Mikhail Natarevich, Samuil Nevelshtein, Dmitry Oboznenko, Sergei Osipov, Lia Ostrova, Filaret Pakun, Varlen Pen, Boris Petrov, Nikolai Pozdneev, Stepan Privedentsev, Valentina Rakhina, Semion Rotnitsky, Maria Rudnitskaya, Vladimir Sakson, Alexander Samokhvalov, Ivan Savenko, Alexander Semionov, Arseny Semionov, Yuri Shablikin, Boris Shamanov, Alexander Shmidt, Elena Skuin, Alexander Sokolov, Alexander Stolbov, Victor Teterin, Nikolai Timkov, Yuri Tulin, Boris Ugarov, Ivan Varichev, Rostislav Vovkushevsky, Vecheslav Zagonek, Ruben Zakharian, Elena Zhukova, and other important Leningrad artists.

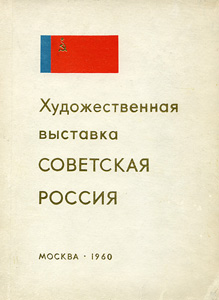
Exhibition Catalogue

- Exhibition of works by Leningrad artists of 1960 was opened in Leningrad in State Russian Museum. The participants were Piotr Alberti, Evgenia Antipova, Taisia Afonina, Genrikh Bagrov, Vsevolod Bazhenov, Irina Baldina, Nikolai Baskakov, Yuri Belov, Piotr Belousov, Piotr Buchkin, Zlata Bizova, Vladimir Chekalov, Sergei Frolov, Nikolai Galakhov, Vladimir Gorb, Elena Gorokhova, Abram Grushko, Alexei Eriomin, Mikhail Kaneev, Engels Kozlov, Marina Kozlovskaya, Tatiana Kopnina, Maya Kopitseva, Boris Korneev, Alexander Koroviakov, Elena Kostenko, Nikolai Kostrov, Anna Kostrova, Gevork Kotiantz, Vladimir Krantz, Yaroslav Krestovsky, Valeria Larina, Boris Lavrenko, Ivan Lavsky, Piotr Litvinsky, Oleg Lomakin, Dmitry Maevsky, Gavriil Malish, Nikita Medovikov, Evsey Moiseenko, Nikolai Mukho, Andrey Milnikov, Vera Nazina, Mikhail Natarevich, Anatoli Nenartovich, Samuil Nevelshtein, Dmitry Oboznenko, Vladimir Ovchinnikov, Vecheslav Ovchinnikov, Sergei Osipov, Nikolai Pozdneev, Alexander Pushnin, Lev Russov, Galina Rumiantseva, Maria Rudnitskaya, Ivan Savenko, Vladimir Sakson, Gleb Savinov, Alexander Samokhvalov, Alexander Semionov, Arseny Semionov, Yuri Shablikin, Boris Shamanov, Alexander Shmidt, Nadezhda Shteinmiller, Elena Skuin, Galina Smirnova, Alexander Sokolov, Alexander Stolbov, Victor Teterin, Nikolai Timkov, Mikhail Tkachev, Leonid Tkachenko, Mikhail Trufanov, Yuri Tulin, Ivan Varichev, Anatoli Vasiliev, Valery Vatenin, Nina Veselova, Rostislav Vovkushevsky, Vecheslav Zagonek, Sergei Zakharov, Ruben Zakharian, and other important Leningrad artists.
- First National Art Exhibition "Soviet Russia" was opened in Moscow "Manezh". Exhibition displayed more than 2,400 works of art of painters, sculptors, graphics, masters of arts and crafts, artists of theater and cinema. Among them were Mikhail Anikushin, Irina Baldina, Olga Bogaevskaya, Vsevolod Bazhenov, Mikhail Bobyshov, Sergey Gerasimov, Igor Grabar, Aleksei Gritsai, Alexander Deyneka, Alexei Eriomin, Mikhail Kaneev, Boris Ioganson, Lev Kerbel, Alexander Kibalnikov, Sergey Konenkov, Maya Kopitseva, Boris Korneev, Engels Kozlov, Anatoli Levitin, Alexander Laktionov, Vsevolod Lishev, Dmitriy Nalbandyan, Ernst Neizvestny, Arkady Plastov, Alexander Samokhvalov, Gleb Savinov, Vladimir Serov, Nikolai Timkov, Nikolai Tomsky, Mikhail Trufanov, Yuri Tulin, Boris Ugarov, Vasily Vatagin, Nina Veselova, and many others most prominent artists of the Russian Federation.

== Deaths ==
- March 3 – Nina Veselova (born 1922), Russian Soviet painter.
- March 18 – Alexander V. Kuprin (born 1880), Russian painter, a member of the Jack of Diamonds group.
- May 16 – Igor Grabar (born 1871), Russian post-impressionist painter, publisher, restorer and historian of art, People's Artist of USSR.
- October 22 – Alexander Matveyev (born 1878), Russian sculptor and art educator.
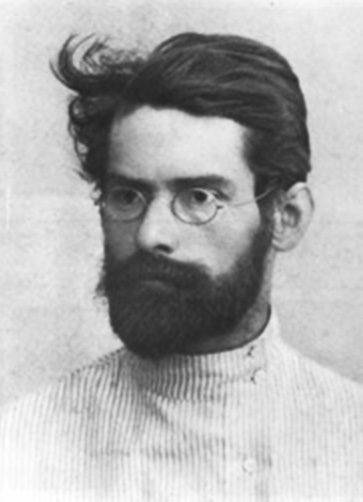
Alexander V. Kuprin

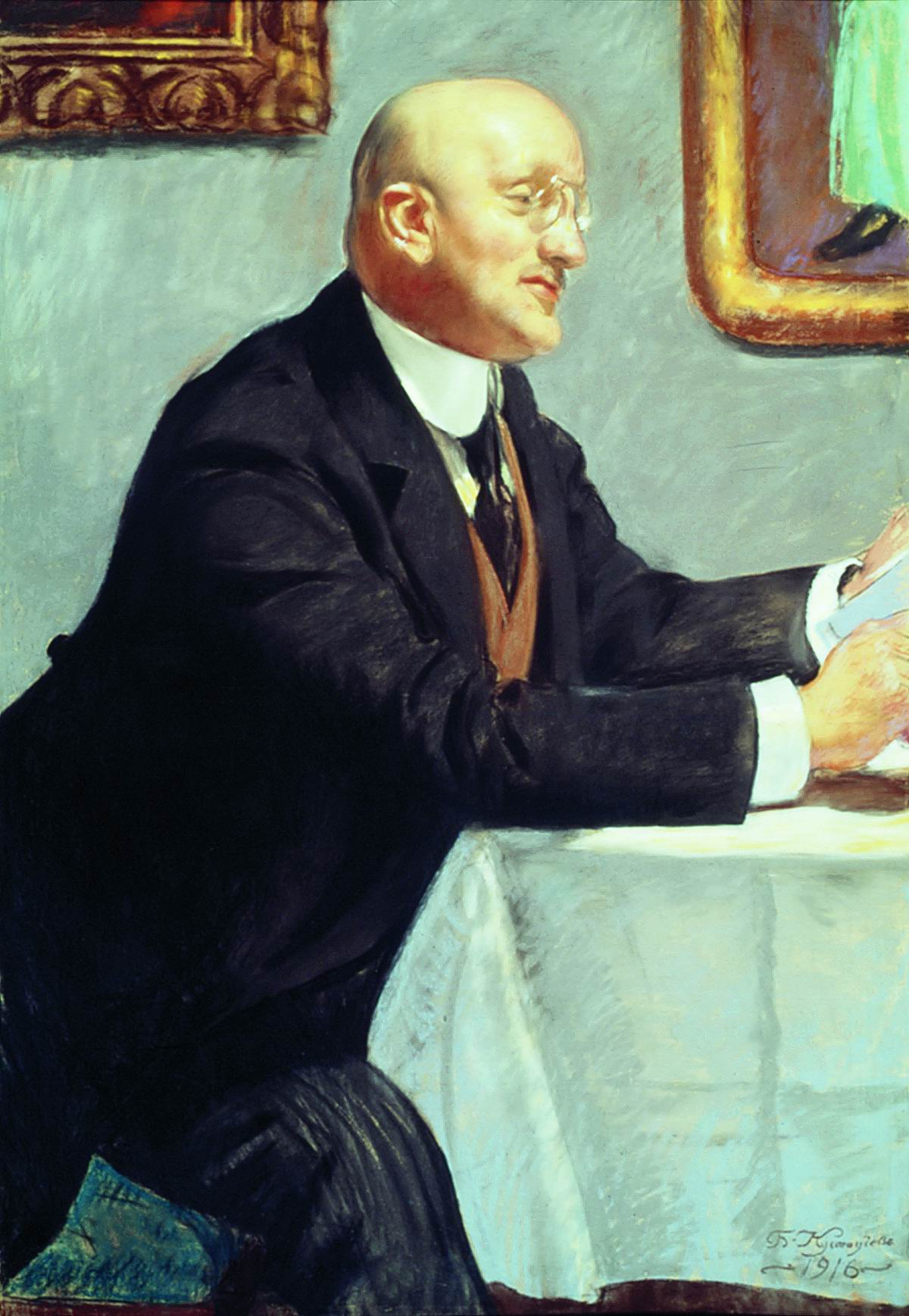
Portrait of Igor Grabar by Boris Kustodiev, 1916

== See also ==
- Lenin in Kremlin (painting)
- List of Russian artists
- List of painters of Leningrad Union of Artists
- Saint Petersburg Union of Artists
- Russian culture
- 1960 in the Soviet Union

== Sources ==
- Exhibition of works by Leningrad artists of 1960. Exhibition Catalogue. – Leningrad: Khudozhnik RSFSR, 1963.
- Exhibition of works by Leningrad artists of 1960. Catalogue. – Leningrad: Khudozhnik RSFSR, 1961.
- Artists of peoples of the USSR. Biobibliography Dictionary. Volume 1. - Moscow: Iskusstvo, 1970.
- Artists of peoples of the USSR. Biobibliography Dictionary. Volume 2. - Moscow: Iskusstvo, 1972.
- Directory of Members of Union of Artists of USSR. Volume 1,2. – Moscow: Soviet Artist Edition, 1979.
- Directory of Members of the Leningrad branch of the Union of Artists of Russian Federation. – Leningrad: Khudozhnik RSFSR, 1980.
- Artists of peoples of the USSR. Biobibliography Dictionary. Volume 4 Book 1. - Moscow: Iskusstvo, 1983.
- Directory of Members of the Leningrad branch of the Union of Artists of Russian Federation. – Leningrad: Khudozhnik RSFSR, 1987.
- Artists of peoples of the USSR. Biobibliography Dictionary. Volume 4 Book 2. - Saint Petersburg: Academic project humanitarian agency, 1995.
- Matthew C. Bown. Dictionary of 20th Century Russian and Soviet Painters 1900-1980s. - London: Izomar, 1998.
- Vern G. Swanson. Soviet Impressionism. – Woodbridge, England: Antique Collectors' Club, 2001.
- Sergei V. Ivanov. Unknown Socialist Realism. The Leningrad School. – Saint-Petersburg: NP-Print Edition, 2007. - ISBN 5-901724-21-6, ISBN 978-5-901724-21-7.
- Anniversary Directory graduates of Saint Petersburg State Academic Institute of Painting, Sculpture, and Architecture named after Ilya Repin, Russian Academy of Arts. 1915–2005. – Saint Petersburg: Pervotsvet Publishing House, 2007.
- Igor N. Pishny. The Leningrad School of painting. Socialist realism of 1930-1980s: Selected names. – Saint Petersburg: Kolomenskaya versta, 2008. - ISBN 978-5-91555-005-5.
