= 1957 in fine arts of the Soviet Union =

The year 1957 was marked by many events that left an imprint on the history of Soviet and Russian fine arts.

== Events ==
- February 23 - "Exhibition of paintings, sculpture, drawing to the First All-Union Congress of Soviet Artists" was opened in Moscow. The participants were Aleksandr Gerasimov, Alexander Deyneka, Sergei Zakharov, Pavel Korin, Evsey Moiseenko, Mikhail Natarevich, Ivan Savenko, Gleb Savinov, Boris Ioganson, Alexander Laktionov, Arkady Plastov, Nikolai Timkov, Victor Teterin, Yuri Tulin and other important Soviet artists.
- February 28 - The First All-Union Congress of Soviet Artists has been opened in Moscow. Congress established a single Union of Artists of the USSR and elected its executive bodies - the Board and a Secretariat. The system of Union of Artists of the USSR included unions of artists of Union and Autonomous republics, as well as local organizations of artists of some regions, provinces and cities. The Union worked to improve the professional skills of its members, promoting their creativity, organized and financed the creative work of artists. Congress established the new publications of the Union of Artists of the USSR: Magazines "Creativity" and "Decorative Arts of the USSR." The jurisdiction of the Union of Artists of the USSR were also Exhibitions Division, Experimental Studio, the Art Fund of the USSR, publishing house "Soviet Artist".
- June 19 - The Monument to Alexander Pushkin, built by sculptor Mikhail Anikushin was inaugurated in Leningrad on the Square of Art in front of the State Russian Museum.
- July 20 - The Exhibition of works by young artists of the USSR for the VI World Festival of Youth and Students was opened in Moscow. Among the participants - Ilya Glazunov, Mikhail Kaneev, Piotr Litvinsky, Lev Russov, and other artists.
- October 3 - The Exhibition of Leningrad artists dedicated to the 40th Anniversary of the Great October Socialist Revolution was opened in Leningrad in the State Russian Museum. Its exponents were 600 artists, including Mikhail Anikushin, Evgenia Antipova, Vsevolod Bazhenov, Irina Baldina, Nikolai Baskakov, Piotr Belousov, Piotr Buchkin, Zlata Bizova, Vladimir Chekalov, Sergei Frolov, Nikolai Galakhov, Abram Grushko, Alexei Eriomin, Mikhail Kaneev, Engels Kozlov, Tatiana Kopnina, Maya Kopitseva, Boris Korneev, Alexander Koroviakov, Nikolai Kostrov, Anna Kostrova, Gevork Kotiantz, Yaroslav Krestovsky, Boris Lavrenko, Ivan Lavsky, Oleg Lomakin, Dmitry Maevsky, Gavriil Malish, Alexei Mozhaev, Evsey Moiseenko, Nikolai Mukho, Mikhail Natarevich, Samuil Nevelshtein, Dmitry Oboznenko, Lev Orekhov, Sergei Osipov, Vladimir Ovchinnikov, Nikolai Pozdneev, Alexander Pushnin, Lev Russov, Galina Rumiantseva, Ivan Savenko, Gleb Savinov, Alexander Samokhvalov, Arseny Semionov, Alexander Mikhailovich Semionov, Boris Shamanov, Alexander Shmidt, Nadezhda Shteinmiller, Galina Smirnova, Ivan Sorokin, Victor Teterin, Mikhail Tkachev, Leonid Tkachenko, Yuri Tulin, Ivan Varichev, Nina Veselova, Rostislav Vovkushevsky, Anatoli Vasiliev, Lazar Yazgur, Vecheslav Zagonek, Ruben Zakharian, Sergei Zakharov, Maria Zubreeva, and other important Leningrad artists.
- November 5 - The All Union Art Exhibition dedicated to 40th Anniversary of the Great October Socialist Revolution was opened in Moscow. The participants were more than 2100 artists from all the Republics of the USSR, including Mikhail Anikushin, Vsevolod Bazhenov, Nikolai Baskakov, Irina Baldina, Piotr Belousov, Piotr Buchkin, Zlata Bizova, Nikolai Galakhov, Aleksandr Gerasimov, Elena Gorokhova, Alexander Deyneka, Alexei Eriomin, Engels Kozlov, Maya Kopitseva, Boris Korneev, Boris Lavrenko, Oleg Lomakin, Evsey Moiseenko, Mikhail Natarevich, Samuil Nevelshtein, Yuri Neprintsev, Dmitry Oboznenko, Vladimir Ovchinnikov, Nikolai Pozdneev, Alexander Pushnin, Ivan Savenko, Gleb Savinov, Alexander Samokhvalov, Alexander Semionov, Nadezhda Shteinmiller, Victor Teterin, Nikolai Timkov, Mikhail Trufanov, Yuri Tulin, Ivan Varichev, Piotr Vasiliev, Nina Veselova, Vecheslav Zagonek, Sergei Zakharov, Maria Zubreeva, and others.
- December 8 - An Exhibition "Two Hundred Years of the Academy of Arts of the USSR" was opened in the Museum of the Academy of Arts in Leningrad. Its exponents were Anatoli Vasiliev, Isaak Brodsky, Aleksandr Gerasimov, Evsey Moiseenko, Igor Veselkin, Yuri Neprintsev, Vladimir Sakson, Gleb Savinov, Mikhail Trufanov, and others.
- Solo Exhibition of works by Nikolai Timkov was opened in the Leningrad Union of Artists.
- Solo Exhibition of works by Alexander Deyneka was opened in Moscow.

== Deaths ==
- May 14 - Marie Vassilieff, painter
- November 20 - Mstislav Dobuzhinsky, graphic artist
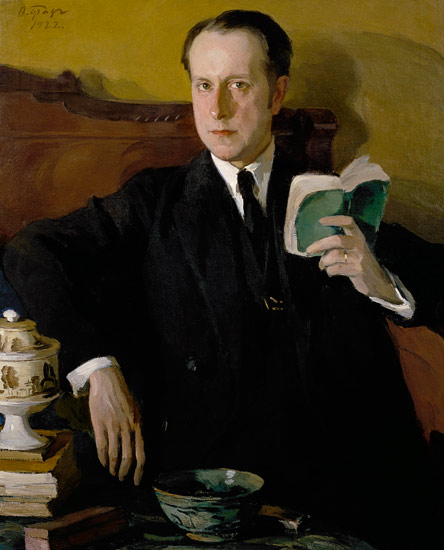
Portrait of Dobuzhinsky by Osip Braz, 1922

== See also ==
- Portrait of Yevgeny Mravinsky
- List of Russian artists
- List of painters of Leningrad Union of Artists
- Saint Petersburg Union of Artists
- Russian culture
- 1957 in the Soviet Union

== Sources ==
- Exhibition of paintings, sculpture, drawing to the First All-Union Congress of Soviet Artists. Catalogue. - Moscow: The Organizing Committee of the Union of Soviet Artists, 1957.
- Exhibition of works by young artists of the Soviet Union to the VI World Festival of Youth and Students. Catalogue. - Moscow: The Union of Artists of the USSR, 1957.
- All-Union Art Exhibition of 1957 dedicated to the 40th Anniversary of October Revolution. Catalogue. - Moscow: Soviet artist, 1957.
- 1917 - 1957. Exhibition of works by Leningrad artists of 1957. Exhibition Catalogue. - Leningrad: Khudozhnik RSFSR, 1958.
- Two Hundred years of USSR Academy of Arts. Exhibition catalogue. - Leningrad - Moscow: Academy of Art of the USSR, 1958.
- Travelling Exhibition of Leningrad artists. Catalogue. - Murmansk: Leningrad Union of Artists, 1957.
- Alexander Deyneka. Exhibition of works. Catalogue. - Moscow: Soviet Artists, 1957.
- Nikolai Timkov. Exhibition catalogue. - Leningrad: Khudozhnik RSFSR, 1957.
- Artists of peoples of the USSR. Biography Dictionary. Volume 1. - Moscow: Iskusstvo, 1970.
- Artists of peoples of the USSR. Biography Dictionary. Volume 2. - Moscow: Iskusstvo, 1972.
- Fine Arts of the Leningrad. Exhibition Catalogue. - Leningrad: Khudozhnik RSFSR, 1976.
- Directory of Members of Union of Artists of USSR. Volume 1,2. - Moscow: Soviet Artist Edition, 1979.
- Directory of Members of the Leningrad branch of the Union of Artists of Russian Federation. - Leningrad: Khudozhnik RSFSR, 1980.
- Artists of peoples of the USSR. Biography Dictionary. Volume 4 Book 1. - Moscow: Iskusstvo, 1983.
- Directory of Members of the Leningrad branch of the Union of Artists of Russian Federation. - Leningrad: Khudozhnik RSFSR, 1987.
- Artists of peoples of the USSR. Biography Dictionary. Volume 4 Book 2. - Saint Petersburg: Academic project humanitarian agency, 1995.
- Link of Times: 1932 - 1997. Artists - Members of Saint Petersburg Union of Artists of Russia. Exhibition catalogue. - Saint Petersburg: Manezh Central Exhibition Hall, 1997.
- Matthew C. Bown. Dictionary of 20th Century Russian and Soviet Painters 1900-1980s. - London: Izomar, 1998.
- Vern G. Swanson. Soviet Impressionism. - Woodbridge, England: Antique Collectors' Club, 2001.
- Sergei V. Ivanov. Unknown Socialist Realism. The Leningrad School. - Saint-Petersburg: NP-Print Edition, 2007. - ISBN 5-901724-21-6, ISBN 978-5-901724-21-7.
- Anniversary Directory graduates of Saint Petersburg State Academic Institute of Painting, Sculpture, and Architecture named after Ilya Repin, Russian Academy of Arts. 1915 - 2005. - Saint Petersburg: Pervotsvet Publishing House, 2007.
- Igor N. Pishny. The Leningrad School of painting. Socialist realism of 1930-1980s: Selected names. – Saint Petersburg: Kolomenskaya versta, 2008. - ISBN 978-5-91555-005-5.
