= Exhibition of Leningrad artists (1961) =

1961 Soviet art exhibition

Exhibition of Leningrad artists of 1961. Catalog
- Year: 1961
- Location: State Russian Museum; Leningrad

Exhibition of Leningrad artists of 1961 (Russian: '"Выставка произведений ленинградских художников 1961 года") was opened on September 13, and become one of the largest Art Exhibition of 1961 in the USSR. The Exhibition took place in State Russian Museum.

== History and Organization ==
For the organization and preparation of Exhibition was formed specially Exhibition Committee which consisted of 50 the most authoritative art-experts. Exhibition Catalog was published. In total, the Exhibition displayed almost 1100 works of art of painters, sculptors, graphics, artists of theater and cinema, masters of arts and crafts. At whole Exhibition attended over 650 artists of the Leningrad. About 170 art works the viewer is not seen in the exhibition, as they have been selected to represent the Leningrad artists at an All-Union Art Exhibition in Moscow, which opened a few days later.

== Contributing Artists ==
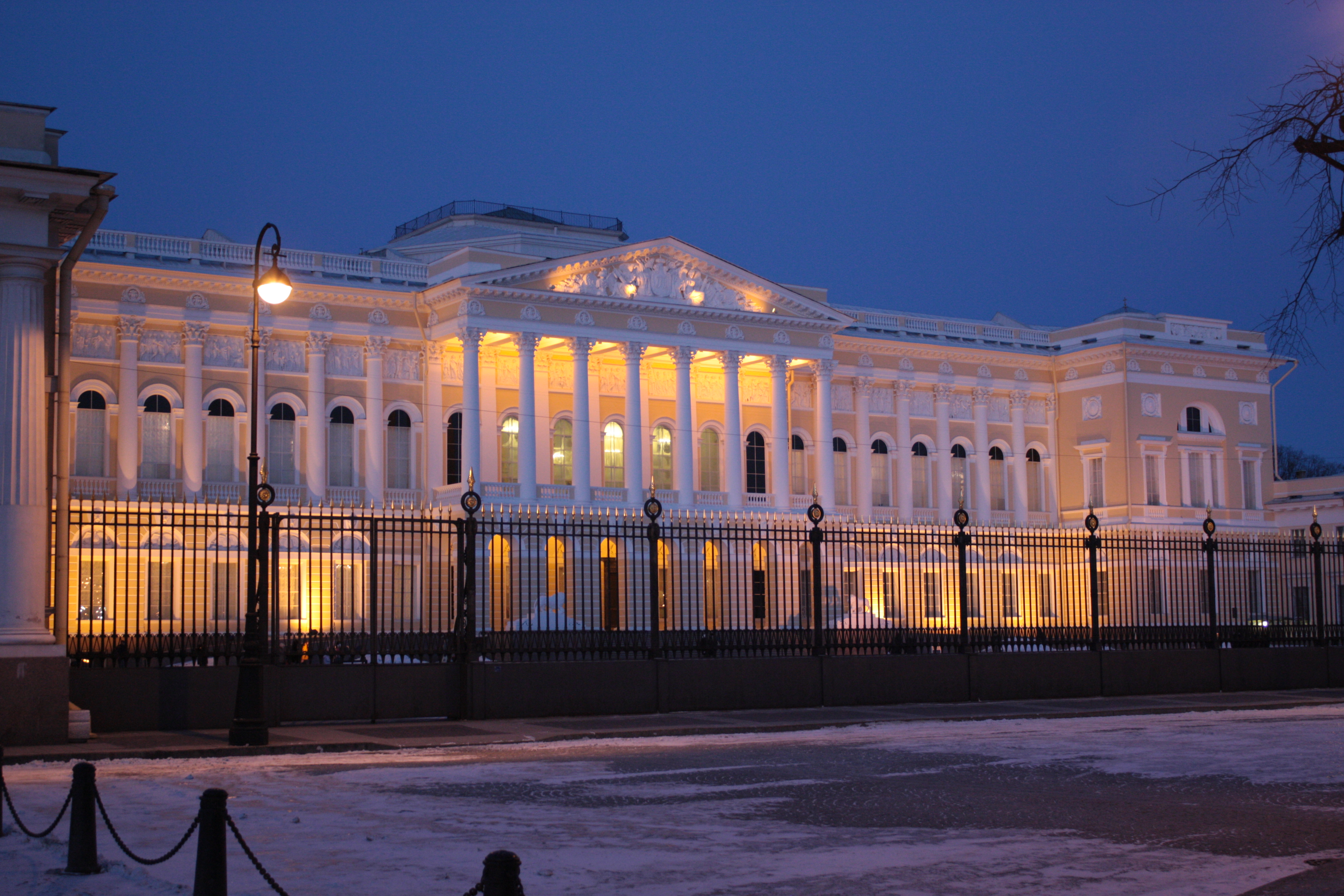
State Russian Museum

In the largest Department of Painting were exhibited art works of 298 authors. There were Piotr Alberti, Evgenia Antipova, Taisia Afonina, Vsevolod Bazhenov, Irina Baldina, Nikolai Baskakov, Leonid Baykov, Yuri Belov, Piotr Belousov, Olga Bogaevskaya, Lev Bogomolets, Nikolai Brandt, Piotr Buchkin, Zlata Bizova, Nikolai Galakhov, Ivan Godlevsky, Elena Gorokhova, Abram Grushko, Oleg Eremeev, Alexei Eriomin, Mikhail Kaneev, Maria Kleschar-Samokhvalova, Mikhail Kozell, Engels Kozlov, Marina Kozlovskaya, Maya Kopitseva, Boris Korneev, Alexander Koroviakov, Elena Kostenko, Anna Kostrova, Gevork Kotiantz, Yaroslav Krestovsky, Valeria Larina, Boris Lavrenko, Ivan Lavsky, Anatoli Levitin, Oleg Lomakin, Dmitry Maevsky, Vladimir Malevsky, Gavriil Malish, Eugene Maltsev, Evsey Moiseenko, Alexei Mozhaev, Nikolai Mukho, Vera Nazina, Mikhail Natarevich, Anatoli Nenartovich, Samuil Nevelshtein, Yuri Neprintsev, Dmitry Oboznenko, Sergei Osipov, Vladimir Ovchinnikov, Lia Ostrova, Filaret Pakun, Genrikh Pavlovsky, Varlen Pen, Boris Petrov, Nikolai Pozdneev, Stepan Privedentsev, Alexander Pushnin, Valentina Rakhina, Semion Rotnitsky, Galina Rumiantseva, Lev Russov, Maria Rudnitskaya, Ivan Savenko, Gleb Savinov, Vladimir Sakson, Alexander Samokhvalov, Vladimir Seleznev, Arseny Semionov, Alexander Semionov, Yuri Shablikin, Boris Shamanov, Alexander Shmidt, Nadezhda Shteinmiller, Elena Skuin, Kim Slavin, Galina Smirnova, Alexander Sokolov, Alexander Stolbov, Victor Teterin, Nikolai Timkov, Leonid Tkachenko, Mikhail Trufanov, Yuri Tulin, Boris Ugarov, Ivan Varichev, Anatoli Vasiliev, Piotr Vasiliev, Valery Vatenin, Lazar Yazgur, German Yegoshin, Vecheslav Zagonek, Sergei Zakharov, Elena Zhukova, Maria Zubreeva, and others most prominent painters of the Leningrad School.

In the Department of Sculptures were exhibited art works of 154 sculptors. Department of graphics presented a creation of 165 artists.

== Contributed Artworks ==
For the Exhibition were selected art works created in 1960-1961, also some earlier works. All they were exhibited in the first time. Some of them were subsequently found in the collections of Soviet Art museums, as well as domestic and foreign galleries and collectors.

Historical painting was presented of "Victory Salute" by Eugene Maltsev, "The Red came" by Evsey Moiseenko, "Lenin with peasants" by Sergei Osipov, "Son of the Party" by Genrikh Pavlovsky, "Happy meeting with Lenin" by Galina Smirnova, "Leningraders in 1941" by Boris Ugarov, and others.

Portrait was presented of "Bread seller" by Elena Gorokhova, "A Mother" by Maria Kleschar-Samokhvalova, "Portrait of girl", "Portrait of Academician Mikhail Kostenko", "Portrait of Academician Baranov" by Elena Kostenko, "Girl with Peaches" by Gevork Kotiantz, "Group portrait of workers" by Valeria Larina, "Portrait of Ira Gay" by Anatoli Levitin, "Portrait of noble fancier Nina Hämäläinen", "Milkmaid" by Oleg Lomakin, "Portrait of Gorunov" by Dmitry Maevsky, "Portrait of architect Zhuk with Family", "Portrait of concertmaster Arkin", "Portrait of Kira Izotova" by Lia Ostrova, "Herdboy", "Portrait of Alexei Demitkin, brigadier of installers" by Genrikh Pavlovsky, "Girl on the porch", "Portrait of Academician Nikolai Davidenkov", "Portrait of Mashkovsky" by Varlen Pen, "Portrait of miller Borodulin", "Portrait of Neganov, chief designer of atomic icebreaker Lenin" by Semion Rotnitsky, "Ironshaper of the factory Russian Diesel", "Young Ironshaper" by Lev Russov, "Nina", "Portrait of Old Man" by Vladimir Sakson, "Notable shepherds" by Vladimir Seleznev, "Girl with fruits" by Elena Skuin, "Portrait of Piotr Protasov, Hero of Labour" by Alexander Sokolov, "Portrait of Honored teacher Nikulina", "Portrait of sculptor Kira Suvorova" by Alexander Stolbov, "Girls of Donbass", "Portrait of Girl", "Girl - mainer", "At reading" by Mikhail Trufanov, "Portrait of Zoya Kislakova", "Portrait of builder Kuchumov", "Portrait of Kuznetsova, a farm worker" by Yuri Tulin, "Khanifa", "A Boy", "Portrait of student" by Maria Zubreeva, and others.

Genre painting was presented of "Women - workers of the pig farm", "Volunteers in the collective farm" by Nikolai Baskakov, "Dream" by Yuri Belov, "Born seven-year plan" by Nikolai Brandt, "A Song" by Piotr Buchkin, "Builders of Hydro-electric station" by Zlata Bizova, "Karelian Loggers", "Soon timber rafting" by Nikolai Galakhov, "Enthusiasts", "Evening" by Oleg Eremeev, "A Morning" by Alexei Eriomin, "Country needs a metal" by Boris Korneev, "Soon exams" by Engels Kozlov, "Admiralty Shipyard" by Yaroslav Krestovsky, "In Holiday" by Boris Lavrenko, "After the work", "They need Peace" by Anatoli Levitin, "On the collective farm fair" by Oleg Lomakin, "Summer Day" by Vladimir Malevsky, "In Summer", "Spring has come", "Autumn Day", "A Porch" by Nikolai Pozdneev, "Sports festival in kolkhoz" by Stepan Privedentsev, "On the Volga River" by Alexander Pushnin, "In the Morning" by Valentina Rakhina, "On Stadium" by Maria Rudnitskaya, "Geologists in the Urals", "Conquest of the river", "Taiga retreats" by Ivan Savenko, "Emporium Kirovsky", "Narva Triumphal Gate in Leningrad", "Motor Racing in Jukki" by Gleb Savinov, "Morning gymnastics" by Vladimir Sakson, "Appassionata", "Light-Blue Twilight" by Alexander Samokhvalov, "At the alloy" by Ivan Varichev, "On the Dvina River" by Anatoli Vasiliev, "The First acquaintance" by Piotr Vasiliev, "Children's skating-rink", "Painting of porcelain" by German Yegoshin, and others.

Landscape and Cityscape were presented of "A Midday" by Leonid Baykov, "In Yacht-club", "A North" by Lev Bogomolets, "April" by Zlata Bizova, "Autumn in Crimea", "The Seaside Park" by Ivan Godlevsky, "White Night" by Abram Grushko, "Korbozero" by Alexei Eriomin, "Leningrad Circus", "Fontanka River" by Mikhail Kaneev, "Winter Palace", "Pushkin Square" by Alexander Koroviakov, "Towards Spring" by Mikhail Kozell, "A North" by Marina Kozlovskaya, "White Night in Leningrad", "The Canal in the morning", "Winter day in Leningrad" by Yaroslav Krestovsky, "Bolshaya Okhta" by Ivan Lavsky, "Breath of spring" by Dmitry Maevsky, "Native open spaces" by Lia Ostrova, "Haystacks", "In the Old Ladoga", "Wet Snow", "Square at the village Council" by Sergei Osipov, "Dnieper River", "Trypillia" by Filaret Pakun, "Soviet Far East" by Varlen Pen, "Zelenogorsk" by Genrikh Pavlovsky, "Cheget", "Night on the peak Terskol" by Boris Petrov, "Klaipėda" by Valentina Rakhina, "Northern road", "Taiga retreats" by Ivan Savenko, "The house opposite" by Gleb Savinov, "In the Tian Shan Mountains", "A Road to Jeti-Oguz", "Red House", "Blue Gate" by Vladimir Sakson, "Salts town in Leningrad", "Near the Belinsky bridge in Leningrad", "Moyka River" by Alexander Semionov, "Winter motive of the Leningrad", "St Isaak's Square in Leningrad", "Bolsheokhtinsky Bridge in Leningrad", "Universitetskaya Embankment in Leningrad", "Winter in the Old Ladoga", "Country Council in Old Ladoga", "Shipyard. Finnish Gulf" by Arseny Semionov, "Northern landscape", "Shozhma River", "At the small station" by Yuri Shablikin, "Light-Blue Window" by Boris Shamanov, "Bakhchysarai. Etude", "Small street in Bakhchysarai" by Alexander Shmidt, "Factory", "On the Neva River", "Right bank of the Neva River", "Volodarsky Bridge in Leningrad", "Yachts" by Nadezhda Shteinmiller, "A March" by Victor Teterin, "First Snow", "Aspen grove", "Winter crops", "Warm Autumn" by Nikolai Timkov, "The Leningrad" by Leonid Tkachenko, "Chernaya River" by Mikhail Trufanov, "Pskov", "Near Belozersk" by Boris Ugarov, "A Spring", "Ladoga", "Haystacks" by Ivan Varichev, "Boats" by Anatoli Vasiliev, "Winter close to Moscow" by Valery Vatenin, "Winter trail", "Country store in Old Ladoga" by Lazar Yazgur, "Thunderstorm has passed", "Winter Day" by Vecheslav Zagonek, "Tadjikistan. Industrial landscape" by Sergei Zakharov, "Cloudy Day", "Volkhov Distances", "Hot Day" by Elena Zhukova, and others.

Still life paintings were presented of "Apples", "Still life", "Snowdrops" by Olga Bogaevskaya, "Still life with Blue table-cloth", "Bananas", "Poppies", "Still life with persimmon", "Lilies" by Maya Kopitseva, "Evening Still life" by Vladimir Sakson, "Autumn Flowers", "Wildflowers" by Boris Shamanov, "Still life with melon", "Still life with Apples" by Elena Skuin, "Silver Still life", "Autumn Still life" by Kim Slavin, "Still life" by Victor Teterin, "Still life with Watermelon", "Still life with Melon" by Sergei Zakharov, and others.

== Acknowledgment ==
Exhibition of the Leningrad artists of 1961 was widely covered in press and in literature on Soviet fine art.

== See also ==
- Fine Art of Leningrad
- Leningrad School of Painting
- Soviet art
- 1961 in fine arts of the Soviet Union
- Saint Petersburg Union of Artists
- Socialist realism

== Sources ==
- Открытие выставки произведений ленинградских художников к XXII съезду КПСС // Вечерний Ленинград, 1961, 13 сентября.
- Труфанов М. Девушки Донбасса // Вечерний Ленинград, 1961, 16 сентября.
- Острова Л. Родные просторы // Вечерний Ленинград, 1961, 16 сентября.
- Аникушин М. Р. М. Глиэр // Вечерний Ленинград, 1961, 16 сентября.
- Ломакин О. Портрет доярки // Вечерний Ленинград, 1961, 18 сентября.
- Герман М. Первые впечатления. Заметки о живописи и графике на осенней выставке // Вечерний Ленинград, 1961, 23 сентября.
- Обозненко Д., Серов Я. Встреча Н. Хрущёва с американскими рабочими // Вечерний Ленинград, 1961, 28 сентября.
- Мацулевич Ж. В камне, стекле и металле // Ленинградская правда, 1961, 5 октября.
- Выставка произведений ленинградских художников 1961 года. Каталог. Л., Художник РСФСР, 1964.
- Справочник членов Ленинградской организации Союза художников РСФСР. Л., Художник РСФСР, 1980.
- Художники народов СССР. Биобиблиографический словарь. Т.1-4. М., Искусство, 1970-1995.
- Справочник членов Союза художников СССР. Т.1-2. М., Советский художник, 1979.
- Хроника узловых событий художественной жизни России 1960-1980-х годов // Time for Change. The Art of 1960-1985 in the Soviet Union. Saint Petersburg, State Russian Museum, 2006.
- Sergei V. Ivanov. Unknown Socialist Realism. The Leningrad School. Saint Petersburg, NP-Print Edition, 2007. P.393-394, 416, 442. ISBN 5-901724-21-6, ISBN 978-5-901724-21-7
- Юбилейный Справочник выпускников Санкт-Петербургского академического института живописи, скульптуры и архитектуры имени И. Е. Репина Российской Академии художеств. 1915—2005. Санкт Петербург, «Первоцвет», 2007.
