= 1956 in fine arts of the Soviet Union =

The year 1956 was marked by many events that left an imprint on the history of Soviet and Russian Fine Arts.

== Events ==
- February 13 - "Exhibition of works of Soviet artists of 1917-1956" was opened in Tretyakov gallery in Moscow. The participants were Mikhail Avilov, Aleksandr Gerasimov, Aleksandr Deyneka, Vecheslav Zagonek, Boris Ioganson, Engels Kozlov, Alexander Laktionov, Arkady Plastov, Mikhail Trufanov, and other important Soviet artists.
- The Leningrad Institute of Painting, Sculpture and Architecture named after Ilya Repin graduated Engels Kozlov, Nikolai Pozdneev, Piotr Nazarov, Anatoli Nenartovich, and other famous artists in the future.
- The "Spring Exhibition of works by Leningrad artists of 1956" was opened in Exhibition Halls of the Leningrad Union of Artists. The participants were Evgenia Antipova, Irina Baldina, Vladimir Gorb, Alexei Eriomin, Maya Kopitseva, Gevork Kotiantz, Boris Lavrenko, Ivan Lavsky, Dmitry Maevsky, Gavriil Malish, Nikolai Mukho, Lev Orekhov, Sergei Osipov, Lev Russov, Ivan Savenko, Arseny Semionov, Alexander Semionov, Yuri Shablikin, Alexander Shmidt, Elena Skuin, Nikolai Timkov, Leonid Tkachenko, Yuri Tulin, Piotr Vasiliev, Vecheslav Zagonek, Ruben Zakharian, and other important Leningrad artists.

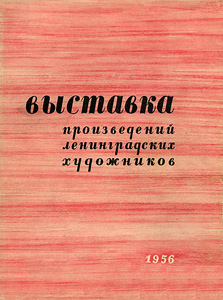
Exhibition Catalogue

- The "Fifth All-Union Exhibition of graduate works of students of art institutes of the USSR issue of 1956" was opened in Moscow. The participants were Engels Kozlov, Nikolai Pozdneev, Piotr Nazarov, Anatoli Nenartovich, and other young artists.
- December 5 - The "Autumn Exhibition of works by Leningrad artists of 1956" was opened in Exhibition Halls of the Leningrad Union of Artists. The participants were Piotr Alberti, Taisia Afonina, Vsevolod Bazhenov, Irina Baldina, Nikolai Baskakov, Yuri Belov, Piotr Belousov, Piotr Buchkin, Sergei Frolov, Nikolai Galakhov, Vladimir Gorb, Abram Grushko, Alexei Eriomin, Mikhail Kaneev, Marina Kozlovskaya, Tatiana Kopnina, Maya Kopitseva, Boris Korneev, Alexander Koroviakov, Elena Kostenko, Nikolai Kostrov, Anna Kostrova, Gevork Kotiantz, Yaroslav Krestovsky, Ivan Lavsky, Oleg Lomakin, Dmitry Maevsky, Gavriil Malish, Alexei Mozhaev, Nikolai Mukho, Samuil Nevelshtein, Sergei Osipov, Vladimir Ovchinnikov, Lev Russov, Ivan Savenko, Gleb Savinov, Vladimir Seleznev, Alexander Semionov, Arseny Semionov, Yuri Shablikin, Boris Shamanov, Alexander Shmidt, Nadezhda Shteinmiller, Victor Teterin, Nikolai Timkov, Mikhail Tkachev, Mikhail Trufanov, Yuri Tulin, Piotr Vasiliev, Igor Veselkin, Rostislav Vovkushevsky, Vecheslav Zagonek, Ruben Zakharian, Sergei Zakharov, and other important Leningrad artists.
- Solo Exhibition of works by Alexander Savinov (1881–1942) was opened in the Leningrad Union of Artists.
- Solo Exhibition of works by Samuil Nevelshtein was opened in the Leningrad Union of Artists.

== Born ==
- September 18 — Victor Lyapkalo (Russian: Ляпкало Виктор Александрович), Russian painter.

== Deaths ==
- February 2 — Pyotr Konchalovsky (Russian: Кончаловский Пётр Петрович), Russian Soviet painter, People's Artist of the Russian Federation (born 1876).
- February 18 — Kliment Red'ko (Russian: Редько Климент Николаевич), Russian Soviet painter (born 1897).
- April 23 — Ivan Shulga (Russian: Шульга Иван Николаевич), Russian Soviet painter, graphic artist, and art educator (born 1889).
- September 26 — Yuly Bershadsky (Russian: Бершадский Юлий Рафаилович), Russian Soviet painter and art educator (born 1869).
- October 27 — Piotr Miturich (Russian: Митурич Пётр Васильевич), Russian Soviet painter and art critic (born 1887).
- December 3 — Alexander Rodchenko (Russian: Родченко Александр Михайлович), Russian Soviet artist, sculptor, photographer and graphic designer, one of the founders of constructivism and Russian design (born 1891).
- December 7 — Alexei Zakolodin-Mitin (Russian: Заколодин-Митин Алексей Иванович), Russian Soviet painter and art educator (born 1892).
- December 27 — Rudolf Frentz (Russian: Френц Рудольф Рудольфович), Russian Soviet artist and art educator, professor of the Repin Institute of Arts, a head of the Studio of Battle painting (born 1888).
- December 28 — Ivan Puni (Russian: Пуни Иван Альбертович), Russian avant-garde artist (born 1894).
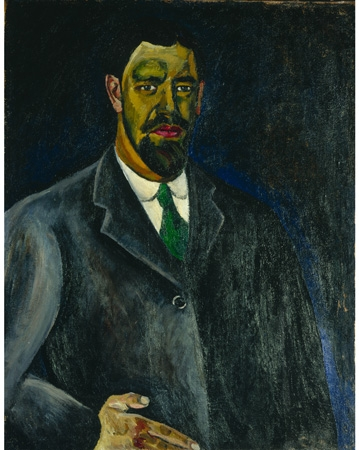
Pyotr Konchalovsky

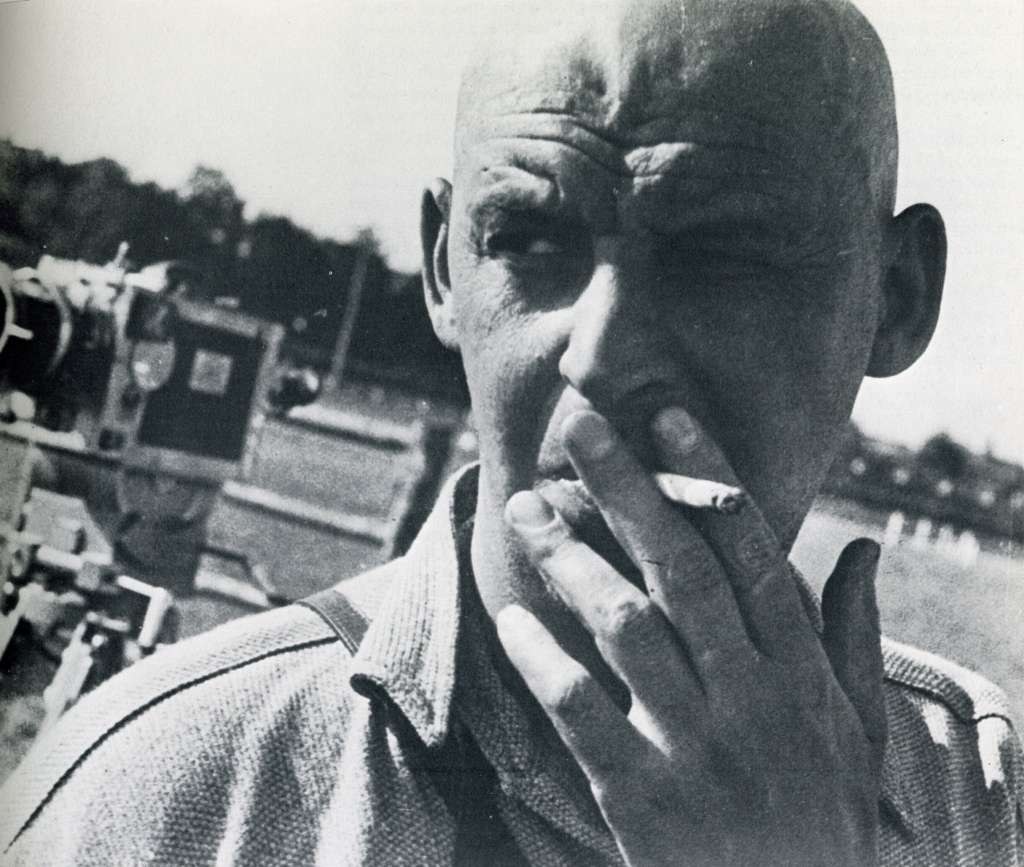
Alexander Rodchenko

== See also ==
- List of Russian artists
- List of painters of Leningrad Union of Artists
- Saint Petersburg Union of Artists
- Russian culture
- 1956 in the Soviet Union

== Sources ==
- Exhibition of works of Soviet artists of 1917-1956. Catalogue. - Moscow: State Tretyakov Gallery, 1956.
- Spring Exhibition of works by Leningrad artists of 1956. Exhibition Catalogue. - Leningrad: Leningrad Union of Artists, 1956.
- Autumn Exhibition of works by Leningrad artists of 1956. Exhibition Catalogue. - Leningrad: Leningrad Artist Edition, 1958.
- Fifth All-Union Exhibition of graduate works of students of art institutes of the USSR issue of 1956. Catalogue. - Moscow: Ministry of Culture of the USSR, 1956.
- Alexander Savinov (1881–1942). Exhibition catalogue. - Leningrad: Leningrad Union of Soviet Artists, 1955.
- Samuil Nevelshtein. Exhibition catalogue. 1956 Year.. - Leningrad: Leningrad Artist, 1958.
- Artists of peoples of the USSR. Biography Dictionary. Volume 1. - Moscow: Iskusstvo, 1970.
- Artists of peoples of the USSR. Biography Dictionary. Volume 2. - Moscow: Iskusstvo, 1972.
- Directory of Members of Union of Artists of USSR. Volume 1,2. - Moscow: Soviet Artist Edition, 1979.
- Directory of Members of the Leningrad branch of the Union of Artists of Russian Federation. - Leningrad: Khudozhnik RSFSR, 1980.
- Artists of peoples of the USSR. Biography Dictionary. Volume 4 Book 1. - Moscow: Iskusstvo, 1983.
- Directory of Members of the Leningrad branch of the Union of Artists of Russian Federation. - Leningrad: Khudozhnik RSFSR, 1987.
- Artists of peoples of the USSR. Biography Dictionary. Volume 4 Book 2. - Saint Petersburg: Academic project humanitarian agency, 1995.
- Matthew C. Bown. Dictionary of 20th Century Russian and Soviet Painters 1900-1980s. - London: Izomar, 1998.
- Vern G. Swanson. Soviet Impressionism. - Woodbridge, England: Antique Collectors' Club, 2001.
- Sergei V. Ivanov. Unknown Socialist Realism. The Leningrad School. - Saint-Petersburg: NP-Print Edition, 2007. - ISBN 5-901724-21-6, ISBN 978-5-901724-21-7.
- Anniversary Directory graduates of Saint Petersburg State Academic Institute of Painting, Sculpture, and Architecture named after Ilya Repin, Russian Academy of Arts. 1915 - 2005. - Saint Petersburg: Pervotsvet Publishing House, 2007.
- Igor N. Pishny. The Leningrad School of painting. Socialist realism of 1930-1980s: Selected names. – Saint Petersburg: Kolomenskaya versta, 2008. - ISBN 978-5-91555-005-5.
