= Lyrical motifs in postwar Leningrad painting (Saint Petersburg, 1995) =

1995 Soviet art Exhibition in Saint Petersburg

Zoya
- Artist: Lev Russov
- Year: 1957
- Location: Private Collection; Russia

Retrospective Exhibition Lyrical motifs in postwar Leningrad painting (Russian: Лирика в произведениях ленинградских художников военного поколения) became one of the most notable event in the Saint Petersburg exhibition live of 1995. The Exhibition took place in Nikolai Nekrasov Memorial Museum and was dedicated to 50th Anniversary of the Victory in Great Patriotic war of 1941–1945. There were exhibited 146 art works from private collections of more than 50 importrant masters of the Leningrad School of Painting.

== History and organization ==
Exhibition was opened on May 5, and worked up to the end of June, 1995. Catalog was published.

== Contributing artists ==
There were exhibited art works of Taisia Afonina, Piotr Alberti, Evgenia Antipova, Irina Baldina, Vsevolod Bazhenov, Piotr Belousov, Yuri Belov, Piotr Buchkin, Vladimir Chekalov, Evgeny Chuprun, Irina Dobrekova, Nikolai Galakhov, Abram Grushko, Alexei Eriomin, Mikhail Kaneev, Maya Kopitseva, Alexander Koroviakov, Elena Kostenko, Mikhail Kozell, Marina Kozlovskaya, Boris Lavrenko, Ivan Lavsky, Piotr Litvinsky, Dmitry Maevsky, Gavriil Malish, Valentina Monakhova, Alexei Mozhaev, Nikolai Mukho, Mikhail Natarevich, Anatoli Nenartovich, Samuil Nevelshtein, Lev Orekhov, Sergei Osipov, Vladimir Ovchinnikov, Nikolai Pozdneev, Evgeny Pozdniakov, Galina Rumiantseva, Kapitolina Rumiantseva, Lev Russov, Alexander Samokhvalov, Alexander Semionov, Nadezhda Shteinmiller, Alexander Sokolov, German Tatarinov, Nikolai Timkov, Mikhail Tkachev, Leonid Tkachenko, Anatoli Vasiliev, Piotr Vasiliev, Igor Veselkin, Rostislav Vovkushevsky, Lazar Yazgur, Ruben Zakharian, Maria Zubreeva, and some other artists.

== Contributed artworks ==
For the Exhibition were selected art works created in 1940-1980s. Some of them were exhibited before, some paintings were shown in the first time. In general, exhibition presented lyrical motifs in painting of the middle – second half of the twentieth century by the postwar generations of Leningrad artists.

Genre painting was represented of A Worker – innovator by Yuri Belov, A Memory by Irina Dobrekova, At the bathing pool by Maya Kopitseva, Children playing by Elena Kostenko, Grand reception of sailors by Alexei Mozhaev, Oriental courtyard by Valentina Monakhova, A Citizen by Mikhail Natarevich, Asphalting by Anatoli Nenartovich, On the beach by Alexander Samokhvalov, Grain has gone by Alexander Sokolov, and some others.

Portrait painting was represented of Portrait of wife by Piotr Alberti, Portrait of artist Margarita Ruban by Taisia Afonina, Model as a Hunter by Yuri Belov, Portrait of Young Woman by Piotr Belousov, Portrait of sculptor Igor Krestovsky by Piotr Buchkin, Junior Sergeant, A Head of Soldier by Vladimir Chekalov, Sasha Kuznetsov by Alexander Koroviakov, A Girl with Red Ribbon by Samuil Nevelshtein, Zoya, Kira by Lev Russov, A Boy by Alexander Sokolov, A Head of Old Man by Leonid Tkachenko, and some others.

Landscape and Cityscape painting was represented At the Old Tuchkov bridge by Taisia Afonina, Denmark on the horizon by Vsevolod Bazhenov, Summer on Vetluga River, Summer in Kem by Nikolai Galakhov, A March by Dmitry Maevsky, Blooming Meadow by Gavriil Malish, Early green, Wildflowers by Sergei Osipov, Spring is on the way, Moonlight night on the Volga River by Vladimir Ovchinnikov, Rafts on the Kama River, Pier in Yelabuga by Anatoli Vasiliev, Pier on Oka River by Igor Veselkin, Old Novgorod by Rostislav Vovkushevsky, of and some others.

Still life painting was represented of Still life with Pussy-Willows by Taisia Afonina, Peonies and Cherry by Piotr Alberti, Guests had left by Yuri Belov, Tea service on the green table-cloth by Maya Kopitseva, Autumn still life by Alexander Koroviakov, Roses by Samuil Nevelshtein, Dandelions by Sergei Osipov, and some others.

== Acknowledgment ==
Exhibition was widely covered in press and in literature on Soviet fine art.

== See also ==
- Fine Art of Leningrad
- Spring is on the way (painting)
- Soviet art
- Leningrad School of Painting
- Saint Petersburg Union of Artists
- Socialist realism

== Sources ==
- Подвиг века. Художники, скульпторы, архитекторы, искусствоведы в годы Великой Отечественной войны и блокады Ленинграда. Л., Лениздат, 1969.
- Никифоровская И. Художники осажденного города. Л., Искусство, 1985.
- Лирика в произведениях художников военного поколения. Выставка произведений. Каталог. СПб., Мемориальный музей Н. А. Некрасова, 1995.
- Арсеньева З. Немного лирики // "Пятница". Еженедельное приложение к газете "Час Пик", 8 мая 1995.
- Справочник членов Ленинградской организации Союза художников РСФСР. Л., Художник РСФСР, 1987.
- Художники народов СССР. Биографический словарь. Т.1-4. М., Искусство, 1970–1995.
- Справочник членов Союза художников СССР. Том 1,2. М., Советский художник, 1979.
- Sergei V. Ivanov. Unknown Socialist Realism. The Leningrad School. Saint Petersburg: NP-Print Edition, 2007. P.405, 423. ISBN 5-901724-21-6, ISBN 978-5-901724-21-7
- Юбилейный справочник выпускников Санкт-Петербургского академического института живописи, скульптуры и архитектуры имени И. Е. Репина Российской Академии художеств. 1915–2005. СПб., Первоцвет, 2007.
