= Vladimir Ovchinnikov (painter) =

Russian painter

Vladimir Ivanovich Ovchinnikov
- Born: 14 July 1911; Saratov, Russian Empire
- Died: 22 June 1978 (aged 66); Leningrad, USSR
- Education: Saratov Art School
- Known for: Painting
- Notable work: Spring is on the way (1972)
- Movement: Realism

Vladimir Ivanovich Ovchinnikov (Russian: Влади́мир Ива́нович Овчи́нников; 14 July 1911 – 22 June 1978) was a Soviet, Russian painter, lived and worked in Leningrad, member of the Leningrad branch of Union of Artists of Russian Federation, regarded as one of the leading representatives of the Leningrad school of painting, most famous for his landscape paintings.

== Biography ==
Vladimir Ovchinnikov was born on 14 July 1911 in the village of Esipovka near the city of Saratov at the Volga River in a peasant family. The village was located on the eighth mile of tract named Astrakhan, who went from Saratov in the south. In 1917 it had 60 peasant households. His mother died in 1916. During the war his father worked in a slaughterhouse and his sons – Konstantin, Vladimir, and Gregory remained in the care of grandmothers and aunts.

In 1927 Ovchinnikov joined the Saratov Art College where he studied with renowned artist and educator Piotr Utkin. After the first course with his friend he made a big trip down the Volga River from Saratov to its source. Most of the way they walked. The first stop they made in Ulyanovsk, walked on Zhiguli Hills. Were in Kazan, Nizhny Novgorod, Plessis, Yaroslavl, Kostroma, Tver, reached Seliger lake. This perception of nature, this interest to the ordinary life of the country played a large role in his growing up and in its formation as a person. In 1929, when he was not yet 18, he first participated in the regional art exhibition.

Spring is on the way. 1972

In 1931, Vladimir Ovchinnikov, graduated from Saratov Art College and moved to Leningrad, where he entered the Institute of Proletarian Fine Arts (since 1932 known as Institute of Painting, Sculpture and Architecture; Since 1944 named after Ilya Repin), however, after finishing the first course, leaves the institution for family reasons. In early 1932 in the family of Vladimir and his wife Vera was born son, Vecheslav, who later became an artist, as a father. In 1937 was born the youngest son Leo.

In 1932–1941 Ovchinnikov runs a designer in various institutions of Leningrad. Simultaneously he engaged in painting and drawing in Vasily Savinsky Art Studio, then at the Leningrad Institute of Improvement qualification of Art workers by Pavel Naumov, Alexander Karev, Rudolf Frentz.

In 1941–1945 Ovchinnikov took part in the Great Patriotic War, which led the Soviet people against Nazi Germany and its allies. He was wounded and marked by military awards. After demobilization, Ovchinnikov, returned to Leningrad, works in LenIZO, carries advertising and design orders for the largest shops in the city. At the same time he restores his creative skills that were lost during the war years, many works on nature studies in the city and its suburbs (Priozersk, Komarovo, Levashovo).

Since early 1950s works of Vladimir Ovchinnikov has consistently exhibited in Leningrad, All-Russian, and All-Union Art exhibitions, attracting the attention of high culture of painting and a special insight into the world of nature. His leading genre becomes a landscape, main forms – nature studies, and large landscape-painting. In the panoramic landscapes he has sought to cover a larger space, the image of the set clearly readable plans. Well-known examples of paintings of this period include the work On the Volga(1951), Evening. At the well (1953), Dnieper cliffs (1955), Spring (1956), Along the banks of the Dnieper (1957), and others. They are distinguished by a refined flavor, richness of tone relations, the use of various textures painting. Particular attention is paid Ovchinnikov to the image of the sky. In 1953, after the show at the exhibition a series of such works carried out in Ukraine, Vladimir Ovchinnikov accept as a member of the Leningrad Union of Soviet Artists.

Vladimir Ovchinnikov has had a few particularly productive periods, both in quantity and quality of painted works and their effect on all subsequent works of the artist. In 1953–1955 this period was associated with travel to the city of Kanev on the Dnieper River. Delighted with the beauty of the Dnieper banks, the artist painted many sketches, expressing alive, the immediate impression of a majestic image what he saw. These include the work of Before the Rain (1954), Evening on the Dnieper River (1956), On the bank of the Dnieper (1956), A Night (1957), and others. It was during this period known as "Kanevsky" paintings of Ovchinnikov gets its breadth, magnitude, color, and tonality, which subsequently constitute important features of his individual style. According to these features of his works will be unmistakable at the art shows.

In the late of 1950s Ovchinnikov had traveled at the lower Volga River and the Caspian Sea. New bright impressions capture him. Southern nature, filled with sun and light, was very close to the artist. In works of Caspian time were fully reveals a powerful pictorial talent of Ovchinnikov. His painting gets special texture, unusual colour, and become very ringing. These qualities distinguish the work of Makhachkala. Port (1958), Boats in the Night (1958), Fishermen of the Caspian Sea (1958), When is fishing season (Caspian Sea) (1959), and other works.

In 1960–1970 the main theme of Ovchinnikov creativity again becomes the Volga river, the village of Pristannoe, as well as ancient Russian cities of Torzhok, Staritsa, Old Ladoga. The works of this period is of particular excellence. Ovchinnikov appears in them as the largest modern master of the landscape. Emphasis in his works shifts from transmission of ingenuous impressions to the expressions of complex emotions. Among the most famous works of this period the painting Street in the village Pristannoe(1966), The village of Pristannoe (1967), Indian Summer, Evening in the Country (both 1967), Zhiguli Hills (1968), Windy day on the Volga River (1970), A Spring (1971), Saint George's Cathedral in Old Ladoga (1971), Spring is on the way, Silence, Saint George church in fine day, Portrait of wife (all of 1972), Staritsa town (1973), Fields above the Volga river (1975), Moonlight night on the Volga (1975), Evening on the Volga River (1975) and others.

In the mid-1970s Vladimir Ovchinnikov became seriously ill and had two operations. He died of intestinal cancer on 22 June 1978 in Leningrad, at the age of sixty-seven. Real recognition came to Vladimir Ovchinnikov after death. The scale of his talent represented at the exhibition of 1988 in halls of the Leningrad Union of Artists, surprised even his friends and colleagues. International fame soon followed. In 1989–1991 at the art auctions of "L'Ecole de Leningrad" in Paris his work enjoyed great success. One of his landscapes of the Volga river was purchased for the Paris city hall by the future president of French Republic. Today his paintings reside in State Russian museum, in art museums and private collections in Russia, Japan, France, in the U.S., England, and throughout the world.

== Principal exhibitions ==
See Principal exhibitions by Vladimir Ovchinnikov
- 1951 (Leningrad): Exhibition of works by Leningrad artists of 1951, with Piotr Alberti, Vsevolod Bazhenov, Piotr Belousov, Piotr Buchkin, Rudolf Frentz, Nikolai Galakhov, Vladimir Gorb, Tatiana Kopnina, Nikolai Kostrov, Anna Kostrova, Alexander Lubimov, Evsey Moiseenko, Mikhail Natarevich, Yuri Neprintsev, Vladimir Ovchinnikov, Sergei Osipov, Alexander Pushnin, Ivan Savenko, Gleb Savinov, Alexander Samokhvalov, Vladimir Seleznev, Alexander Shmidt, Nadezhda Shteinmiller, Nikolai Timkov, Leonid Tkachenko, Mikhail Tkachev, Yuri Tulin, Igor Veselkin, Nina Veselova, Rostislav Vovkushevsky, Vecheslav Zagonek, and other important Leningrad artists.
- 1956 (Leningrad): Autumn Exhibition of works by Leningrad artists of 1956, with Piotr Alberti, Taisia Afonina, Vsevolod Bazhenov, Irina Baldina, Nikolai Baskakov, Yuri Belov, Piotr Belousov, Piotr Buchkin, Sergei Frolov, Nikolai Galakhov, Vladimir Gorb, Abram Grushko, Alexei Eriomin, Mikhail Kaneev, Marina Kozlovskaya, Tatiana Kopnina, Maya Kopitseva, Boris Korneev, Alexander Koroviakov, Elena Kostenko, Nikolai Kostrov, Anna Kostrova, Gevork Kotiantz, Yaroslav Krestovsky, Ivan Lavsky, Oleg Lomakin, Dmitry Maevsky, Gavriil Malish, Alexei Mozhaev, Nikolai Mukho, Samuil Nevelshtein, Sergei Osipov, Vladimir Ovchinnikov, Lev Russov, Ivan Savenko, Gleb Savinov, Vladimir Seleznev, Alexander Semionov, Arseny Semionov, Yuri Shablikin, Boris Shamanov, Alexander Shmidt, Nadezhda Shteinmiller, Victor Teterin, Nikolai Timkov, Mikhail Tkachev, Mikhail Trufanov, Yuri Tulin, Piotr Vasiliev, Igor Veselkin, Rostislav Vovkushevsky, Vecheslav Zagonek, Ruben Zakharian, Sergei Zakharov, and other important Leningrad artists.
- 1957 (Leningrad): 1917–1957. Leningrad Artist's works of Art Exhibition, with Evgenia Antipova, Vsevolod Bazhenov, Irina Baldina, Nikolai Baskakov, Piotr Belousov, Piotr Buchkin, Zlata Bizova, Vladimir Chekalov, Sergei Frolov, Nikolai Galakhov, Abram Grushko, Alexei Eriomin, Mikhail Kaneev, Engels Kozlov, Tatiana Kopnina, Maya Kopitseva, Boris Korneev, Alexander Koroviakov, Nikolai Kostrov, Anna Kostrova, Gevork Kotiantz, Yaroslav Krestovsky, Boris Lavrenko, Ivan Lavsky, Oleg Lomakin, Dmitry Maevsky, Gavriil Malish, Alexei Mozhaev, Evsey Moiseenko, Nikolai Mukho, Mikhail Natarevich, Samuil Nevelshtein, Dmitry Oboznenko, Lev Orekhov, Sergei Osipov, Vladimir Ovchinnikov, Nikolai Pozdneev, Alexander Pushnin, Lev Russov, Galina Rumiantseva, Ivan Savenko, Gleb Savinov, Alexander Samokhvalov, Arseny Semionov, Alexander Mikhailovich Semionov, Boris Shamanov, Alexander Shmidt, Nadezhda Shteinmiller, Galina Smirnova, Ivan Sorokin, Victor Teterin, Mikhail Tkachev, Leonid Tkachenko, Yuri Tulin, Ivan Varichev, Nina Veselova, Rostislav Vovkushevsky, Anatoli Vasiliev, Lazar Yazgur, Vecheslav Zagonek, Ruben Zakharian, Sergei Zakharov, Maria Zubreeva, and other important Leningrad artists.
- 1957 (Moscow): All-Union Art Exhibition of 1957 dedicated to the 40th Anniversary of October Revolution, with Vsevolod Bazhenov, Nikolai Baskakov, Irina Baldina, Piotr Belousov, Piotr Buchkin, Zlata Bizova, Nikolai Galakhov, Elena Gorokhova, Alexei Eriomin, Engels Kozlov, Maya Kopitseva, Boris Korneev, Boris Lavrenko, Oleg Lomakin, Nikita Medovikov, Evsey Moiseenko, Mikhail Natarevich, Samuil Nevelshtein, Yuri Neprintsev, Dmitry Oboznenko, Vladimir Ovchinnikov, Nikolai Pozdneev, Alexander Pushnin, Ivan Savenko, Gleb Savinov, Alexander Samokhvalov, Alexander Semionov, Nadezhda Shteinmiller, Victor Teterin, Nikolai Timkov, Mikhail Trufanov, Yuri Tulin, Ivan Varichev, Piotr Vasiliev, Nina Veselova, Vecheslav Zagonek, Sergei Zakharov, Maria Zubreeva, and other important Leningrad artists.
- 1958 (Leningrad): Autumn Exhibition of works by Leningrad artists of 1958, with Taisia Afonina, Irina Baldina, Evgenia Baykova, Vsevolod Bazhenov, Piotr Belousov, Yuri Belov, Zlata Bizova, Sergei Frolov, Nikolai Galakhov, Elena Gorokhova, Abram Grushko, Alexei Eriomin, Mikhail Kaneev, Marina Kozlovskaya, Tatiana Kopnina, Boris Korneev, Alexander Koroviakov, Elena Kostenko, Nikolai Kostrov, Anna Kostrova, Gevork Kotiantz, Yaroslav Krestovsky, Valeria Larina, Boris Lavrenko, Ivan Lavsky, Piotr Litvinsky, Oleg Lomakin, Dmitry Maevsky, Gavriil Malish, Alexei Mozhaev, Evsey Moiseenko, Nikolai Mukho, Anatoli Nenartovich, Yuri Neprintsev, Dmitry Oboznenko, Sergei Osipov, Vladimir Ovchinnikov, Nikolai Pozdneev, Alexander Pushnin, Maria Rudnitskaya, Galina Rumiantseva, Lev Russov, Ivan Savenko, Gleb Savinov, Alexander Samokhvalov, Arseny Semionov, Alexander Semionov, Yuri Shablikin, Boris Shamanov, Alexander Shmidt, Nadezhda Shteinmiller, Elena Skuin, Alexander Sokolov, Nikolai Timkov, Yuri Tulin, Ivan Varichev, Anatoli Vasiliev, Piotr Vasiliev, Igor Veselkin, Vecheslav Zagonek, and other important Leningrad artists.
- 1960 (Leningrad): Exhibition of works by Leningrad artists of 1960, with Piotr Alberti, Evgenia Antipova, Taisia Afonina, Genrikh Bagrov, Vsevolod Bazhenov, Irina Baldina, Nikolai Baskakov, Yuri Belov, Piotr Belousov, Piotr Buchkin, Zlata Bizova, Vladimir Chekalov, Sergei Frolov, Nikolai Galakhov, Vladimir Gorb, Elena Gorokhova, Abram Grushko, Alexei Eriomin, Mikhail Kaneev, Engels Kozlov, Marina Kozlovskaya, Tatiana Kopnina, Maya Kopitseva, Boris Korneev, Alexander Koroviakov, Elena Kostenko, Nikolai Kostrov, Anna Kostrova, Gevork Kotiantz, Vladimir Krantz, Yaroslav Krestovsky, Valeria Larina, Boris Lavrenko, Ivan Lavsky, Piotr Litvinsky, Oleg Lomakin, Dmitry Maevsky, Gavriil Malish, Nikita Medovikov, Evsey Moiseenko, Nikolai Mukho, Andrey Milnikov, Vera Nazina, Mikhail Natarevich, Anatoli Nenartovich, Samuil Nevelshtein, Dmitry Oboznenko, Vladimir Ovchinnikov, Vecheslav Ovchinnikov, Sergei Osipov, Nikolai Pozdneev, Alexander Pushnin, Lev Russov, Galina Rumiantseva, Maria Rudnitskaya, Ivan Savenko, Vladimir Sakson, Gleb Savinov, Alexander Samokhvalov, Alexander Semionov, Arseny Semionov, Yuri Shablikin, Boris Shamanov, Alexander Shmidt, Nadezhda Shteinmiller, Elena Skuin, Galina Smirnova, Alexander Sokolov, Alexander Stolbov, Victor Teterin, Nikolai Timkov, Mikhail Tkachev, Leonid Tkachenko, Mikhail Trufanov, Yuri Tulin, Ivan Varichev, Anatoli Vasiliev, Valery Vatenin, Nina Veselova, Rostislav Vovkushevsky, Vecheslav Zagonek, Sergei Zakharov, Ruben Zakharian, and other important Leningrad artists.
- 1961 (Leningrad): Exhibition of works by Leningrad artists of 1961, with Piotr Alberti, Evgenia Antipova, Taisia Afonina, Vsevolod Bazhenov, Irina Baldina, Nikolai Baskakov, Yuri Belov, Piotr Belousov, Piotr Buchkin, Zlata Bizova, Nikolai Galakhov, Elena Gorokhova, Abram Grushko, Alexei Eriomin, Mikhail Kaneev, Mikhail Kozell, Engels Kozlov, Marina Kozlovskaya, Maya Kopitseva, Boris Korneev, Elena Kostenko, Anna Kostrova, Gevork Kotiantz, Yaroslav Krestovsky, Valeria Larina, Boris Lavrenko, Ivan Lavsky, Oleg Lomakin, Dmitry Maevsky, Gavriil Malish, Nikita Medovikov, Evsey Moiseenko, Alexei Mozhaev, Nikolai Mukho, Vera Nazina, Mikhail Natarevich, Anatoli Nenartovich, Samuil Nevelshtein, Yuri Neprintsev, Dmitry Oboznenko, Sergei Osipov, Vladimir Ovchinnikov, Nikolai Pozdneev, Alexander Pushnin, Galina Rumiantseva, Lev Russov, Maria Rudnitskaya, Ivan Savenko, Gleb Savinov, Vladimir Sakson, Alexander Samokhvalov, Vladimir Seleznev, Arseny Semionov, Alexander Semionov, Yuri Shablikin, Boris Shamanov, Alexander Shmidt, Nadezhda Shteinmiller, Elena Skuin, Galina Smirnova, Alexander Sokolov, Alexander Stolbov, Victor Teterin, Nikolai Timkov, Leonid Tkachenko, Mikhail Trufanov, Yuri Tulin, Ivan Varichev, Anatoli Vasiliev, Piotr Vasiliev, Valery Vatenin, Lazar Yazgur, Vecheslav Zagonek, Sergei Zakharov, Maria Zubreeva, and other important Leningrad artists.
- 1962 (Leningrad): The Fall Exhibition of works by Leningrad artists of 1962, with Piotr Alberti, Evgenia Antipova, Taisia Afonina, Vsevolod Bazhenov, Nikolai Galakhov, Yuri Belov, Vladimir Gorb, Abram Grushko, Alexei Eremin, Engels Kozlov, Alexander Koroviakov, Boris Lavrenko, Ivan Lavsky, Valeria Larina, Oleg Lomakin, Gavriil Malish, Evsey Moiseenko, Nikolai Mukho, Piotr Nazarov, Vera Nazina, Mikhail Natarevich, Dmitry Oboznenko, Lev Orekhov, Vladimir Ovchinnikov, Sergei Osipov, Nikolai Pozdneev, Galina Rumiantseva, Gleb Savinov, Alexander Semionov, Arseny Semionov, Nadezhda Shteinmiller, Alexander Sokolov, Alexander Stolbov, Alexander Tatarenko, Victor Teterin, Nikolai Timkov, Mikhail Trufanov, Yuri Tulin, Ivan Varichev, Anatoli Vasiliev, Valery Vatenin, Rostislav Vovkushevsky, Vecheslav Zagonek, and other important Leningrad artists.
- 1964 (Leningrad): The Leningrad Fine Arts Exhibition, with Piotr Alberti, Evgenia Antipova, Taisia Afonina, Irina Baldina, Nikolai Baskakov, Evgenia Baykova, Vsevolod Bazhenov, Yuri Belov, Piotr Belousov, Piotr Buchkin, Zlata Bizova, Vladimir Chekalov, Sergei Frolov, Nikolai Galakhov, Vasily Golubev, Tatiana Gorb, Abram Grushko, Alexei Eriomin, Mikhail Kaneev, Yuri Khukhrov, Mikhail Kozell, Marina Kozlovskaya, Tatiana Kopnina, Maya Kopitseva, Boris Korneev, Alexander Koroviakov, Elena Kostenko, Nikolai Kostrov, Anna Kostrova, Gevork Kotiantz, Yaroslav Krestovsky, Valeria Larina, Boris Lavrenko, Ivan Lavsky, Piotr Litvinsky, Oleg Lomakin, Dmitry Maevsky, Gavriil Malish, Evsey Moiseenko, Nikolai Mukho, Piotr Nazarov, Vera Nazina, Mikhail Natarevich, Anatoli Nenartovich, Yuri Neprintsev, Dmitry Oboznenko, Sergei Osipov, Vladimir Ovchinnikov, Nikolai Pozdneev, Alexander Pushnin, Galina Rumiantseva, Ivan Savenko, Gleb Savinov, Vladimir Sakson, Alexander Samokhvalov, Vladimir Seleznev, Arseny Semionov, Alexander Semionov, Yuri Shablikin, Boris Shamanov, Alexander Shmidt, Nadezhda Shteinmiller, Elena Skuin, Galina Smirnova, Alexander Sokolov, Ivan Sorokin, Victor Teterin, Nikolai Timkov, Mikhail Tkachev, Mikhail Trufanov, Yuri Tulin, Vitaly Tulenev, Ivan Varichev, Anatoli Vasiliev, Piotr Vasiliev, Valery Vatenin, Lazar Yazgur, Vecheslav Zagonek, Sergei Zakharov, Ruben Zakharian, and other important Leningrad artists.
- 1967 (Moscow): Soviet Russia the Third Republic Exhibition of 1967, with Nikolai Baskakov, Veniamin Borisov, Nikolai Galakhov, Alexei Eriomin, Mikhail Kaneev, Yuri Khukhrov, Engels Kozlov, Marina Kozlovskaya, Maya Kopitseva, Boris Korneev, Nikolai Kostrov, Yaroslav Krestovsky, Boris Lavrenko, Oleg Lomakin, Evsey Moiseenko, Vera Nazina, Samuil Nevelshtein, Yuri Neprintsev, Dmitry Oboznenko, Sergei Osipov, Vladimir Ovchinnikov, Nikolai Pozdneev, Ivan Savenko, Gleb Savinov, Alexander Samokhvalov, Boris Shamanov, Alexander Sokolov, Victor Teterin, Nikolai Timkov, Mikhail Trufanov, Yuri Tulin, Vitaly Tulenev, Ivan Varichev, Igor Veselkin, Vecheslav Zagonek, and other important Leningrad artists.
- 1968 (Leningrad): Autumn Exhibition of works by Leningrad artists of 1968, with Piotr Alberti, Vsevolod Bazhenov, Sergei Frolov, Nikolai Galakhov, Tatiana Gorb, Vladimir Gorb, Mikhail Kaneev, Mikhail Kozell, Engels Kozlov, Elena Kostenko, Nikolai Kostrov, Anna Kostrova, Gevork Kotiantz, Vladimir Krantz, Ivan Lavsky, Dmitry Maevsky, Gavriil Malish, Nikolai Mukho, Mikhail Natarevich, Sergei Osipov, Vladimir Ovchinnikov, Lev Orekhov, Victor Otiev, Maria Rudnitskaya, Ivan Savenko, Vladimir Sakson, Alexander Semionov, Arseny Semionov, Boris Shamanov, Alexander Shmidt, Elena Skuin, Alexander Stolbov, German Tatarinov, Mikhail Trufanov, Yuri Tulin, Ivan Varichev, Anatoli Vasiliev, Rostislav Vovkushevsky, Lazar Yazgur, Vecheslav Zagonek, Sergei Zakharov, Ruben Zakharian, and other important Leningrad artists.
- 1975 (Leningrad): Our Contemporary regional exhibition of Leningrad artists of 1975, with Evgenia Antipova, Taisia Afonina, Vsevolod Bazhenov, Irina Baldina, Nikolai Baskakov, Piotr Belousov, Veniamin Borisov, Zlata Bizova, Nikolai Galakhov, Vasily Golubev, Elena Gorokhova, Abram Grushko, Irina Dobrekova, Alexei Eriomin, Mikhail Kaneev, Yuri Khukhrov, Mikhail Kozell, Marina Kozlovskaya, Engels Kozlov, Maya Kopitseva, Boris Korneev, Elena Kostenko, Nikolai Kostrov, Anna Kostrova, Gevork Kotiantz, Vladimir Krantz, Yaroslav Krestovsky, Boris Lavrenko, Oleg Lomakin, Dmitry Maevsky, Gavriil Malish, Evsey Moiseenko, Piotr Nazarov, Vera Nazina, Mikhail Natarevich, Yuri Neprintsev, Samuil Nevelshtein, Dmitry Oboznenko, Sergei Osipov, Vladimir Ovchinnikov, Nikolai Pozdneev, Alexander Pushnin, Galina Rumiantseva, Kapitolina Rumiantseva, Ivan Savenko, Gleb Savinov, Vladimir Sakson, Alexander Samokhvalov, Arseny Semionov, Alexander Semionov, Yuri Shablikin, Boris Shamanov, Alexander Shmidt, Nadezhda Shteinmiller, Elena Skuin, Galina Smirnova, Alexander Stolbov, Victor Teterin, Nikolai Timkov, Leonid Tkachenko, Mikhail Trufanov, Yuri Tulin, Vitaly Tulenev, Ivan Varichev, Anatoli Vasiliev, Igor Veselkin, Valery Vatenin, Lazar Yazgur, Vecheslav Zagonek, and other important Leningrad artists.
- 1976 (Moscow): The Fine Arts of Leningrad, with Mikhail Avilov, Evgenia Antipova, Nathan Altman, Irina Baldina, Nikolai Baskakov, Yuri Belov, Piotr Belousov, Isaak Brodsky, Piotr Buchkin, Rudolf Frentz, Nikolai Galakhov, Vasily Golubev, Abram Grushko, Alexei Eriomin, Mikhail Kaneev, Engels Kozlov, Marina Kozlovskaya, Maya Kopitseva, Boris Korneev, Elena Kostenko, Nikolai Kostrov, Anna Kostrova, Gevork Kotiantz, Boris Lavrenko, Oleg Lomakin, Alexander Lubimov, Dmitry Maevsky, Gavriil Malish, Evsey Moiseenko, Mikhail Natarevich, Vera Nazina, Yuri Neprintsev, Samuil Nevelshtein, Dmitry Oboznenko, Sergei Osipov, Vladimir Ovchinnikov, Nikolai Pozdneev, Alexander Pushnin, Victor Oreshnikov, Ivan Savenko, Vladimir Sakson, Gleb Savinov, Alexander Samokhvalov, Vladimir Seleznev, Alexander Semionov, Arseny Semionov, Boris Shamanov, Nadezhda Shteinmiller, Elena Skuin, Galina Smirnova, Alexander Sokolov, Victor Teterin, Nikolai Timkov, Mikhail Trufanov, Yuri Tulin, Ivan Varichev, Anatoli Vasiliev, Valery Vatenin, Nina Veselova, Vecheslav Zagonek, Sergei Zakharov, and other important Leningrad artists.
- 1988 (Leningrad): Solo Exhibition of works of art by Vladimir Ovchinnikov, in the Leningrad Union of Artists.
- 1994 (Saint Petersburg): Paintings of 1950-1980s by the Leningrad School artists, with Piotr Alberti, Taisia Afonina, Vsevolod Bazhenov, Piotr Buchkin, Irina Baldina, Veniamin Borisov, Yuri Belov, Piotr Belousov, Vladimir Chekalov, Evgeny Chuprun, Nikolai Galakhov, Irina Dobrekova, Alexei Eriomin, Mikhail Kaneev, Yuri Khukhrov, Mikhail Kozell, Maya Kopitseva, Marina Kozlovskaya, Boris Korneev, Alexander Koroviakov, Elena Kostenko, Piotr Litvinsky, Boris Lavrenko, Dmitry Maevsky, Alexei Mozhaev, Valentina Monakhova, Mikhail Natarevich, Alexander Naumov, Anatoli Nenartovich, Yuri Neprintsev, Samuil Nevelshtein, Dmitry Oboznenko, Lev Orekhov, Sergei Osipov, Vladimir Ovchinnikov, Victor Otiev, Nikolai Pozdneev, Evgeny Pozdniakov, Lev Russov, Galina Rumiantseva, Kapitolina Rumiantseva, Alexander Samokhvalov, Alexander Semionov, Nadezhda Shteinmiller, German Tatarinov, Nikolai Timkov, Mikhail Tkachev, Leonid Tkachenko, Anatoli Vasiliev, Piotr Vasiliev, Rostislav Vovkushevsky, Lazar Yazgur, Vecheslav Zagonek, and other important Leningrad artists.
- 1994 (Saint Petersburg): Etudes done from nature in creativity of the Leningrad School's artists, with Piotr Alberti, Taisia Afonina, Evgenia Antipova, Vsevolod Bazhenov, Irina Baldina, Veniamin Borisov, Zlata Bizova, Vladimir Chekalov, Evgeny Chuprun, Nikolai Galakhov, Tatiana Gorb, Abram Grushko, Irina Dobrekova, Alexei Eriomin, Mikhail Kaneev, Yuri Khukhrov, Mikhail Kozell, Maya Kopitseva, Marina Kozlovskaya, Boris Korneev, Alexander Koroviakov, Elena Kostenko, Piotr Litvinsky, Boris Lavrenko, Ivan Lavsky, Dmitry Maevsky, Alexei Mozhaev, Valentina Monakhova, Nikolai Mukho, Mikhail Natarevich, Alexander Naumov, Anatoli Nenartovich, Dmitry Oboznenko, Lev Orekhov, Sergei Osipov, Vladimir Ovchinnikov, Victor Otiev, Nikolai Pozdneev, Evgeny Pozdniakov, Galina Rumiantseva, Kapitolina Rumiantseva, Lev Russov, Alexander Samokhvalov, Alexander Semionov, Nadezhda Shteinmiller, German Tatarinov, Nikolai Timkov, Mikhail Tkachev, Leonid Tkachenko, Anatoli Vasiliev, Igor Veselkin, Lazar Yazgur, Vecheslav Zagonek, Ruben Zakharian, and other important Leningrad artists.
- 1995 (Saint Petersburg): Lyrical motives in the works of artists of the war generation, with Piotr Alberti, Taisia Afonina, Evgenia Antipova, Vsevolod Bazhenov, Irina Baldina, Veniamin Borisov, Yuri Belov, Piotr Belousov, Piotr Buchkin, Vladimir Chekalov, Evgeny Chuprun, Sergei Frolov, Nikolai Galakhov, Abram Grushko, Mikhail Kaneev, Yuri Khukhrov, Mikhail Kozell, Maya Kopitseva, Marina Kozlovskaya, Boris Korneev, Alexander Koroviakov, Elena Kostenko, Ivan Lavsky, Dmitry Maevsky, Gavriil Malish, Nikolai Mukho, Mikhail Natarevich, Anatoli Nenartovich, Yuri Neprintsev, Samuil Nevelshtein, Lev Orekhov, Sergei Osipov, Vladimir Ovchinnikov, Victor Otiev, Nikolai Pozdneev, Evgeny Pozdniakov, Lev Russov, Galina Rumiantseva, Kapitolina Rumiantseva, Alexander Samokhvalov, Alexander Semionov, Alexander Shmidt, Nadezhda Shteinmiller, Alexander Sokolov, Alexander Tatarenko, German Tatarinov, Victor Teterin, Nikolai Timkov, Mikhail Tkachev, Leonid Tkachenko, Anatoli Vasiliev, Piotr Vasiliev, Igor Veselkin, Rostislav Vovkushevsky, Maria Zubreeva, and other important Leningrad artists.
- 1996 (Saint Petersburg): Paintings of 1940-1990s. The Leningrad School, with Piotr Alberti, Taisia Afonina, Vsevolod Bazhenov, Irina Baldina, Veniamin Borisov, Vladimir Chekalov, Evgeny Chuprun, Nikolai Galakhov, Tatiana Gorb, Abram Grushko, Alexei Eriomin, Mikhail Kaneev, Mikhail Kozell, Maya Kopitseva, Marina Kozlovskaya, Alexander Koroviakov, Vladimir Krantz, Boris Lavrenko, Ivan Lavsky, Piotr Litvinsky, Dmitry Maevsky, Valentina Monakhova, Mikhail Natarevich, Anatoli Nenartovich, Samuil Nevelshtein, Lev Orekhov, Sergei Osipov, Vladimir Ovchinnikov, Victor Otiev, Nikolai Pozdneev, Evgeny Pozdniakov, Lev Russov, Galina Rumiantseva, Kapitolina Rumiantseva, Alexander Samokhvalov, Alexander Semionov, Nadezhda Shteinmiller, German Tatarinov, Nikolai Timkov, Mikhail Tkachev, Leonid Tkachenko, Anatoli Vasiliev, Igor Veselkin, Rostislav Vovkushevsky, Ruben Zakharian, and other important Leningrad artists.
- 2013 (Saint Petersburg): Paintings of 1940–1980 by the Artists of the Leningrad School, in ARKA Gallery, with Taisia Afonina, Evgenia Antipova, Vsevolod Bazhenov, Alexei Eriomin, Dmitry Maevsky, Gavriil Malish, Samuil Nevelshtein, Sergei Osipov, Alexander Semionov, Victor Teterin, Nikolai Timkov, Vitaly Tulenev, and other important Leningrad artists.

== See also ==
- Spring is on the way (painting)
- Fine Art of Leningrad
- Leningrad School of Painting
- Leningrad Union of Artists

== Bibliography ==
- Exhibition of works by Leningrad artists of 1951. Catalogue. Leningrad, Lenizdat, 1951. P.15.
- Autumn Exhibition of works by Leningrad artists of 1956. Exhibition Catalogue. Leningrad, Leningrad Union of Artists Edition, 1958. P.18.
- 1917–1957. Exhibition of works by Leningrad artists of 1957. Catalogue. Leningrad, Khudozhnik RSFSR, 1958. P.23.
- Travelling Exhibition of Leningrad artists. Catalogue. – Murmansk: Leningrad Union of Artists, 1957.
- All-Union Art Exhibition of 1957 dedicated to the 40th Anniversary of October Revolution. Catalogue. Moscow, Soviet artist, 1957. P.55.
- Autumn Exhibition of works by Leningrad artists of 1958. Catalogue. Leningrad, Khudozhnik RSFSR, 1959. P.20.
- Exhibition of works by Leningrad artists of 1960. Exhibition catalogue. Leningrad, Khudozhnik RSFSR, 1961. P.29.
- Soviet Russia republic exhibition of 1960. Exhibition catalogue. Moscow, Ministry of culture of Russian Federation, 1960. P.60.
- Exhibition of works by Leningrad artists of 1961. Exhibition catalogue. Leningrad, Khudozhnik RSFSR, 1964. P.29.
- Autumn Exhibition of works by Leningrad artists of 1962. Exhibition Catalogue. Leningrad, Khudozhnik RSFSR, 1962. P.0.
- The Leningrad Fine Arts Exhibition. Leningrad, Khudozhnik RSFSR, 1965. P.37.
- Soviet Russia the Third Republic Exhibition of 1967. Catalogue. Moscow, Ministry of culture of Russian Federation, 1967. P.42.
- Autumn Exhibition of works by Leningrad artists of 1968. Catalogue. Leningrad, Khudozhnik RSFSR, 1971. P.12.
- The Spring Exhibition of works by Leningrad artists of 1971. Catalogue. - Leningrad: Khudozhnik RSFSR, 1972. - p. 13.
- Our Contemporary regional exhibition of Leningrad artists of 1975. Catalogue. Leningrad, Khudozhnik RSFSR, 1980. P.21.
- The Portrait of Contemporary the Fifth Exhibition of works by Leningrad artists of 1976. Catalogue. – Leningrad: Khudozhnik RSFSR, 1983. - p. 16.
- The Fine Art of Leningrad. Exhibition catalogue. Leningrad, Khudozhnik RSFSR, 1976. P.25.
- Exhibition of works by Leningrad artists dedicated to the 60th Anniversary of October Revolution. Catalogue. – Leningrad: Khudozhnik RSFSR, 1982. - p. 18.
- Directory of members of the Union of Artists of USSR. Volume 2. – Moscow: Soviet artist, 1979. - p. 145.
- Regional Exhibition of works by Leningrad artists of 1980. Exhibition catalogue. – Leningrad: Khudozhnik RSFSR, 1983. - p. 19.
- Exhibitions of Soviet art. Directory. Volume 5. 1954–1958. - Moscow: Soviet Artist, 1981. - pp. 27, 121, 259, 376, 386, 420, 549, 572.
- Exhibition of works by Vladimir Ivanovich Ovchinnikov. Catalogue. Leningrad, Khudozhnik RSFSR, 1984.
- L' École de Leningrad. Catalogue. — Paris: Drouot Richelieu, 16 Juin 1989. — p. 72-73.
- L' École de Leningrad. Catalogue. — Paris: Drouot Richelieu, 27 Novembre 1989. — p. 42-43.
- L' École de Leningrad. Catalogue. — Paris: Drouot Richelieu, 12 Mars 1990. — p. 62-63.
- L' École de Leningrad. Catalogue. — Paris: Drouot Richelieu, 11 Juin 1990. — p. 40-41.
- Exhibition of works by Leningrad artists-veterans of Great Patriotic war. - Leningrad: Khudozhnik RSFSR, 1990. - p. 12.
- Peinture Russe. Catalogue. – Paris: Drouot Richelieu, 18 Fevrier, 1991. - p. 7,29-30.
- Les Saisons Russes. Auction Catalogue. - Paris: Drouot Richelieu, 29 Novembre 1993. - p. 41.
- The Leningrad Artists. Paintings of 1950-1980s. Exhibition catalogue. Saint Petersburg, Saint Petersburg Union of artists, 1994. P.5.
- Painting from the life by Leningrad artists. Exhibition catalogue. Saint Petersburg, Nikolai Nekrasov Memorial museum, 1994. P.5.
- The Lyrics in the works of artists of the war generation. Painting, drawings. Exhibition catalogue. Saint Petersburg, Nikolai Nekrasov Memorial museum, 1995. P.5.
- Paintings of 1940-1990s. The Leningrad School. Saint Petersburg, Nikolai Nekrasov Memorial museum, 1996. P.4.
- Matthew C. Bown. Dictionary of 20th Century Russian and Soviet Painters 1900-1980s. London, Izomar, 1998. ISBN 0-9532061-0-6, ISBN 978-0-9532061-0-0.
- Vern G. Swanson. Soviet Impressionism. Woodbridge, England, Antique Collectors' Club, 2001. P.29,47. ISBN 1-85149-280-1, ISBN 978-1-85149-280-0.
- Sergei V. Ivanov. Unknown Socialist Realism. The Leningrad School. Saint Petersburg, NP-Print Edition, 2007. P.9, 19–22, 24, 366, 389–396, 398–400, 402–406. ISBN 5-901724-21-6, ISBN 978-5-901724-21-7.
- Иванов С.В. Владимир Овчинников в воспоминаниях современников. К 100-летию со дня рождения //Петербургские искусствоведческие тетради. Выпуск 21. СПб, 2011. С.46-53.
- Иванов С.В. Овчинников Владимир Иванович // Страницы памяти. Справочно-биографический сборник. 1941–1945. Художники Санкт-Петербургского (Ленинградского) Союза художников — ветераны Великой Отечественной войны. СПб., Петрополис, 2014. Кн.2. С.142—144.
