= Spring is on the way (painting) =

1972 painting by Vladimir Ovchinnikov

- Artist: Vladimir I. Ovchinnikov
- Year: 1972
- Medium: Oil on canvas
- Dimensions: 60 cm × 70 cm (24 in × 28 in)
- Location: Private collection

Spring is on the way is a painting by the Russian painter Vladimir Ivanovich Ovchinnikov, who lived and worked in Leningrad. A member of the Leningrad branch of Union of Artists of Russian Federation, he is regarded as one of the leading representatives of the Leningrad School of Painting, and is known especially for his landscape paintings.

== History ==
The painting depicts the view of the high bank of the Volkhov River in the Staraya Ladoga with the Church of St John the Baptist, with the Chapel of St Paraskeva and bell tower.

The painting was first exhibited in 1988 in a posthumous exhibition of works by Vladimir Ovchinnikov in the Leningrad Union of Artists. In 1994, it was shown again in the halls of the Leningrad Union of Artists at the exhibition The Paintings of 1950-1980s by Artists of the Leningrad School. In 2007 the painting was reproduced and described among 350 works by Leningrad artists in the book Unknown Socialist Realism. The Leningrad School, published in Russian and English.

== See also ==
- Artist Vladimir Ivanovich Ovchinnikov (1911–1978)
- Leningrad School of Painting

== Bibliography ==
- Владимир Иванович Овчинников. Выставка произведений. Каталог. Вступительная статья Н. В. Васильевой. Составитель каталога В. В. Овчинников. Л., Художник РСФСР, 1984.
- Справочник членов Ленинградской организации Союза художников РСФСР. — Л: Художник РСФСР, 1972. — с.39.
- Справочник членов Союза художников СССР. Том 2. — М: Советский художник, 1979. — с.145.
- Ленинградские художники. Живопись 1950—1980 годов. Каталог. СПб., Выставочный центр ПСХ, 1994. С.4.
- Лирика в произведениях художников военного поколения. Выставка произведений. Каталог. СПб., Мемориальный музей Н. А. Некрасова, 1995. С.4.
- Иванов С. Владимир Овчинников в воспоминаниях современников. К 100-летию со дня рождения // Петербургские искусствоведческие тетради. Вып. 21. СПб, 2011. С.46-53.
