= Maria Kleschar-Samokhvalova =

Russian painter

Maria Kleschar-Samohvalova
- A. Samokhvalov, Portrait of Maria Kleschar-Samohvalova
- Born: August 4, 1915; Poltava Governorate, Russian Empire
- Died: July 21, 2000; Saint Petersburg, Russian Federation
- Known for: Painting
- Movement: Realism

Maria Alexeevna Kleschar-Samohvalova (Russian: Мария Алексеевна Клещар-Самохвалова; August 4, 1915 – July 21, 2000) was a Soviet Russian painter and graphic artist and a member of the Saint Petersburg Union of Artists (known as the Leningrad Union of Artists prior to 1992), who lived and worked in Leningrad - Petersburg. She is regarded as a representative of the Leningrad school of painting.

== Biography ==
Alexander Samokhvalov (1894–1971)

Maria was born August 4, 1915, in the village Pervozvanovka, Poltava Governorate, Ukraine. She was orphaned in 1922 at the age of seven after her mother, Nadezhda Mironovna, died; her father, Alexei Fedorovich, was killed in battle in 1916.

In 1930, she graduated country school and went to Poltava, where she enrolled in medical school and later the paramedic courses of the Red Cross. After attending school, she worked as a nurse until 1935. She also studied at an art studio from 1930 to 1933.

During the Great Patriotic War, Kleschar-Samokhvalova worked as a medical inspector. She had been living in Leningrad since 1945, and in 1950 she married artist Alexander Samokhvalov. She developed her skills as a painter under his influence, and in 1952 she began working in the studio of Samokhvalov on Tuchkov Lane. She painted portraits, landscapes, and still lifes; she used Samokhvalov as a model for many paintings and sketches.

In 1957, Maria began to take part in exhibitions, and in early 1960 she was admitted to Leningrad Union of Soviet Artists; Aleksandr Deyneka signed her reference.

Among her works: Crymea Yard (1957), Poppies (1958), Verochka (1960), Chersonese and Mother (both 1961), Natasha (1962), Olga Bergholtz in the Blockade Days, Still-life, and Girl with Flower (1963), Still-life (1964), Interior and Кomsomol Member Valya Komrakova (both 1968), Roses and Still-life with Yellow Camomiles (both 1970), Still-life with Quince (1972), About Fortunes(1973), Student (1974), Carnations (Selfportrait)(1981), and A Memory (1987).

After Samokhvalov's death, Maria took an active part in the preservation his artistic heritage, publishing his literary heritage and organizing exhibitions of his work.

Maria Kleschar-Samokhvalova died July 21, 2000, in Saint Petersburg at the age of 85 years. Her works are in museums and private collections of Russia and abroad. There are well-known portraits of her painted by Alexander Samokhvalov in 1950–1960.

== See also ==
- Fine Art of Leningrad
- List of 20th-century Russian painters
- List of painters of Saint Petersburg Union of Artists

== Sources ==
- Центральный Государственный Архив литературы и искусства. СПб. Ф.78. Оп.10. Д.207
- Осенняя выставка произведений ленинградских художников 1958 года. Каталог. Л., Художник РСФСР, 1959. С.14.
- Выставка произведений ленинградских художников 1960 года. Каталог. Л., Художник РСФСР, 1963. С.11.
- Выставка произведений ленинградских художников 1961 года. Каталог. Л., Художник РСФСР, 1964. С.20.
- Осенняя выставка произведений ленинградских художников 1962 года. Каталог. Л., Художник РСФСР, 1962. С.14.
- Александр Николаевич Самохвалов. Выставка произведений. Каталог. Л., Художник РСФСР, 1963. С.22.
- Баршова И., Сазонова К. Александр Николаевич Самохвалов. Л., Художник РСФСР, 1963.
- Ленинград. Зональная выставка 1964 года. Каталог. Л, Художник РСФСР, 1965. C.24.
- Каталог весенней выставки произведений ленинградских художников 1965 года. Л., Художник РСФСР, 1970. С.16.
- Осенняя выставка произведений ленинградских художников 1968 года. Каталог. Л., Художник РСФСР, 1971. С.9.
- Осенняя выставка произведений ленинградских художников 1971 года. Каталог. Л., Художник РСФСР, 1973. С.9.
- Натюрморт. Выставка произведений ленинградских художников 1973 года. Л., Художник РСФСР, 1973. С.9.
- Наш современник. Третья выставка произведений ленинградских художников 1973 года. Каталог. Л., Художник РСФСР, 1974. С.8.
- Выставка произведений художников — женщин Ленинграда 1975 года. Каталог. Л., Художник РСФСР, 1979. С.5.
- Справочник членов Ленинградской организации Союза художников РСФСР. Л., Художник РСФСР, 1987. С.57.
- Самохвалов А. Моя Самаркандия. СПб., Искусство России, 1993.
- Александр Николаевич Самохвалов. Каталог выставки. Тверь, Приз, 1994.
- Самохвалов Александр Николаевич. В годы беспокойного солнца. СПб., Всемирное слово, 1996.
- Художники народов СССР. Биобиблиографический словарь. Т.4. Кн.2. СПб., 1995. С.549.
- Связь времен. 1932—1997. Художники — члены Санкт — Петербургского Союза художников России. Каталог выставки. СПб., 1997. С.289.
