= Filaret Pakun =

Russian painter

Filaret Ivanovich Pakun
- Born: 2 December 1912; Chernigov Governorate, Russian Empire, now Ukraine
- Died: 2002 (aged 89–90); Saint Petersburg, Russia
- Known for: Painting
- Movement: Realism
- Awards: Medal "For the Capture of Königsberg"; Medal for Battle Merit; Order of the Patriotic War; Medal "For the Victory Over Germany"

Filaret Ivanovich Pakun (Russian: Филарет Иванович Пакун; 2 December 1912 – 2002) was a Soviet Russian painter, a member of the Saint Petersburg Union of Artists (before 1992 — the Leningrad Union of Artists), who lived and worked in Leningrad, regarded as one of the representatives of the Leningrad school of painting. Filaret Pakun most famous for his later work in the genre of the portrait and the nude painted in the style of French Impressionism.

== See also ==
- Fine Art of Leningrad
- Leningrad School of Painting
- List of 20th-century Russian painters
- List of painters of Saint Petersburg Union of Artists
- Saint Petersburg Union of Artists

== Sources ==
- Выставка произведений ленинградских художников 1951 года. Каталог. Л., Лениздат, 1951. C.16.
- Весенняя выставка произведений ленинградских художников 1955 года. Каталог. Л., ЛССХ, 1956. C.14.
- Осенняя выставка произведений ленинградских художников. 1956 года. Каталог. Л., Ленинградский художник, 1958. C.18.
- 1917 — 1957. Выставка произведений ленинградских художников. Каталог. Л., Ленинградский художник, 1958. C.24.
- Выставка произведений ленинградских художников 1960 года. Каталог. Л., Художник РСФСР, 1963. C.14.
- Выставка произведений ленинградских художников 1960 года. Каталог. Л., Художник РСФСР, 1961. C.31.
- Выставка произведений ленинградских художников 1961 года. Каталог. Л., Художник РСФСР, 1964. C.30.
- Ленинград. Зональная выставка. Л., Художник РСФСР, 1965. C.39.
- По родной стране. Выставка произведений художников Ленинграда. 50 Летию образования СССР посвящается. Каталог. Л., Художник РСФСР, 1974. C.20.
- Зональная выставка произведений ленинградских художников 1980 года. Каталог. Л., Художник РСФСР, 1983. C.19.
- Справочник членов Ленинградской организации Союза художников РСФСР. Л., Художник РСФСР, 1987. C.98.
- L' École de Leningrad. Catalogue. Paris, Drouot Richelieu, 16 Juin, 1989. P.76-77.
- Matthew Cullerne Bown. A Dictionary of Twentieth Century Russian And Soviet Painters. 1900 — 1980s. London, Izomar Limited, 1998.
- Мы помним… Художники, искусствоведы – участники Великой Отечественной войны. М., Союз художников России, 2000. C.211.
- Sergei V. Ivanov. Unknown Socialist Realism. The Leningrad School. Saint Petersburg, NP-Print Edition, 2007. P.390, 434. ISBN 5-901724-21-6, ISBN 978-5-901724-21-7.
