= Boris Petrov =

Russian painter (1910–1981)

Boris Stepanovich Petrov
- Born: 10 July 1910; Oryol, Russian Empire
- Died: 1981 (aged 70–71); Leningrad, USSR
- Education: Repin Institute of Arts
- Known for: Painting, Climbing
- Movement: Realism
- Awards: Medal "For the Defence of Leningrad"; Medal For the Victory Over Germany

Boris Stepanovich Petrov (Russian: Борис Степанович Петров) (10 July 1910 – 1981) was a Russian and Soviet painter and mountain climber, who lived and worked in Leningrad. He was a member of the Leningrad Union of Artists, and regarded as one of representatives of the Leningrad school of painting, mostly known for his mountain landscape paintings.

== Biography ==
Boris Stepanovich Petrov was born on 10 July 1910 in Oryol city. In 1931-1933 he studied in Repin Institute of Arts in Leningrad. In 1933-1941 Petrov worked as a decorator and painter, mainly in genre of landscape. In the second half of 1930s Petrov participated in several exhibitions of Leningrad artists, where he exhibited 17 works painted in the Leningrad suburbs.

Petrov took part in the Great Patriotic War of 1941-1945. He fought on the Leningrad Front, was marked by military awards. In Blockade period he participated in exhibitions of Leningrad artists. After the World War II, Boris Petrov returned to Leningrad and worked as an artist. In 1965 he was admitted to the Leningrad Union of Artists. In 1955 he first visited the Caucasus. Since that time, began his fascination with the mountains and mountaineering. Mountain landscape has taken a leading role in his work. For several months he lived in solitude in the mountains and painted. Solo Exhibitions of his works were in Nalchik in 1960, and in 1963 and 1975 in Leningrad. For over the years Petrov painted a lot of paintings and sketches, and created a whole suite of picturesque mountains, diverse and unexpected in color. His paintings reside in Art museums and private collections in Russia, China, Spain, and other countries.

== See also ==
- Leningrad School of Painting
- List of 20th-century Russian painters
- List of painters of Saint Petersburg Union of Artists
- Saint Petersburg Union of Artists

== Sources ==
- Центральный Государственный Архив литературы и искусства. СПб. Ф.78. Оп.5. Д.165.
- Третья выставка работ художников ленинградского фронта. Л., Военное издательство Наркомата обороны. 1945. С.25.
- Осенняя выставка произведений ленинградских художников 1958 года. Каталог. Л., Художник РСФСР, 1959. С.21.
- Выставка произведений ленинградских художников 1960 года. Каталог. Л., Художник РСФСР, 1963. С.15.
- Выставка произведений ленинградских художников 1961 года. Каталог. Л., Художник РСФСР, 1964. С.31.
- Воспоминания о горах // Ленинградская правда. 1963, 27 марта.
- Каталог весенней выставки произведений ленинградских художников 1965 года. Л., Художник РСФСР, 1970. С.25.
- Осенняя выставка произведений ленинградских художников 1971 года. Каталог. Л., Художник РСФСР, 1973. С. 13.
- Выставка произведений художника-альпиниста Петрова Бориса Степановича. Л., 1975.
- Наш современник. Зональная выставка произведений ленинградских художников 1975 года. Каталог. Л., Художник РСФСР, 1980. C.21.
- Зональная выставка произведений ленинградских художников 1980 года. Каталог. Л., Художник РСФСР, 1983. C.20.
- Справочник членов Ленинградской организации Союза художников РСФСР. Л., Художник РСФСР, 1980. С. 92.
- Matthew Cullerne Bown. A Dictionary of Twentieth Century Russian And Soviet Painters. 1900 — 1980s. London, Izomar Limited, 1998.
- Мы помним… Художники, искусствоведы — участники Великой Отечественной войны. М., СХ России, 2000. С. 215.
- Sergei V. Ivanov. Unknown Socialist Realism. The Leningrad School. Saint Petersburg, NP-Print Edition, 2007. P.387, 393—398. ISBN 5-901724-21-6, ISBN 978-5-901724-21-7.
