= Evgeny Chuprun =

Russian painter

Evgeny Romanovich Chuprun
- Born: 3 June 1927; Ilovaisk, Donetsk Province, Ukrainian SSR, USSR
- Died: 7 January 2005 (aged 77); Saint Petersburg, Russian Federation
- Education: Kaspiysk Higher Navy School
- Known for: Painting
- Movement: Realism

Evgeny Romanovich Chuprun (Russian: Евге́ний Рома́нович Чупру́н; 3 June 1927 – 7 January 2005) was a Russian Soviet realist painter, who lived and worked in Leningrad. He was a member of the Leningrad branch of Union of Artists of Russian Federation, and regarded as one of representatives of the Leningrad school of painting, most famous for his maritime paintings.

== Biography ==
Evgeny Romanovich Chuprun was born on 3 June 1927 in the town of Ilovaisk, Donetsk Province of Ukrainian SSR, USSR.

Be a full wind. Bark Kruzenshtern. 1989

In 1949 Evgeny Chuprun graduated from Kaspiysk Higher Navy School named after Sergei Kirov, located in the city of Baku, Azerbaijan. From 1949 to 1975, he served in the Navy, has held several command posts.

Evgeny Chuprun has participated in art exhibitions since 1960 as maritime and historical painter, and landscape painter. Professional training he held from noted artists Alexander Sokolov, Nikolai Galakhov, Vladimir Seleznev. His personal exhibitions were in Leningrad in 1986, and 1989.

The main themes in the work of Evgeny Chuprun were seascapes, historic sailing vessels, genre and historical compositions on the theme of the fleet and life on the Neva River. His style determined interest in rebuilding by picturesque means the true face of historical ships or historical situation, with natural lighting and natural conditions of air and water.

Since 1980, Evgeny Chuprun was a member of the Leningrad Union of Artists (since 1992, named as Saint Petersburg Union of Artists).

Evgeny Romanovich Chuprun died in Saint Petersburg in 2005. His paintings reside in the Art and History Museums and private collections in the Russia, in the U.S., Japan, France, and others.

== See also ==
- Leningrad School of Painting
- List of painters of Saint Petersburg Union of Artists
- Saint Petersburg Union of Artists

== Bibliography ==
- Directory of members of the Leningrad branch of Union of Artists of Russian Federation. - Leningrad: Khudozhnik RSFSR, 1987. - p. 146.
- Peinture Russe. Catalogue. — Paris: Drouot Richelieu, 26 Avril 1991. - p. 11-12.
- Paintings of 1950-1980s by the Leningrad School's artists. Exhibition catalogue. – Saint Petersburg: Saint Petersburg Union of artists, 1994. - p. 4.
- Sergei V. Ivanov. Unknown Socialist Realism. The Leningrad School. – Saint Petersburg: NP-Print Edition, 2007. – pp. 21, 47, 172, 372, 400-402, 404, 420-422. ISBN 5-901724-21-6, ISBN 978-5-901724-21-7.
