= Galina Smirnova =

Russian artist (1929–2015)

Galina Alexandrovna Smirnova
- Гали́на Алекса́ндровна Смирно́ва
- Born: 17 February 1929; Soligalich, Kostroma Oblast, Russian SFSR
- Died: 12 December 2015 (aged 86)
- Education: Repin Institute of Arts
- Known for: Painting
- Movement: Realism

Galina Alexandrovna Smirnova (Russian: Гали́на Алекса́ндровна Смирно́ва; 17 February 1929 – 12 December 2015) was a Soviet and Russian painter who lived and worked in Saint Petersburg.

She was a member of the Saint Petersburg Union of Artists (before 1992 known as the Leningrad branch of Union of Artists of Russian Federation), regarded as one of representatives of the Leningrad school of painting, most famous for her portraits of contemporaries.

== Biography ==
Galina Alexandrovna Smirnova was born on 17 February 1929 in the town Soligalich, Kostroma Oblast of the Russian SFSR. Between 1944 and 1948, Smirnova studied in Kostroma Art College.

In 1949 Galina Smirnova entered at the first course of Department of Painting at the Leningrad Institute of Painting, Sculpture and Architecture named after Ilya Repin, where she studied under Ivan Stepashkin, Vladislav Anisovich, and Mikhail Avilov.

In 1955 Galina Smirnova graduated from the Leningrad Institute of Painting, Sculpture and Architecture named after Ilya Repin in Yuri Neprintsev workshop together with Piotr Litvinsky, Evgeny Maltsev, Victor Reykhet, Yuri Belov, and other young artists.

From 1955 Smirnova participated in art exhibitions. She painted portraits, genre scenes, landscapes, and still life. In a creative sense, the most interesting are her portraits of contemporaries, as well as nature studies and genre paintings.

Galina Alexandrovna Smirnova was a member of the Saint Petersburg Union of Artists (before 1992 was known as the Leningrad branch of Union of Artists of Russian Federation) since 1960.

Paintings by Galina Alexandrovna Smirnova reside in Art museums and private collections in the Russia, France, Germany, and others.

Smirnova died on 12 December 2015, at the age of 86.

== See also ==
- Leningrad School of Painting
- List of painters of Saint Petersburg Union of Artists
- Saint Petersburg Union of Artists

== Bibliography ==
- Peinture Russe. Catalogue. - Paris: Drouot Richelieu, 18 Fevrier, 1991. - p. 7,50.
- Peinture Russe. Catalogue. - Paris: Drouot Richelieu, 26 Avril, 1991. - p. 7,55.
- Matthew C. Bown. Dictionary of 20th Century Russian and Soviet Painters 1900-1980s. - London: Izomar, 1998. ISBN 0-9532061-0-6, ISBN 978-0-9532061-0-0.
- Sergei V. Ivanov. Unknown Socialist Realism. The Leningrad School.- Saint Petersburg: NP-Print Edition, 2007. – pp. 370, 393, 394, 396, 397. ISBN 5-901724-21-6, ISBN 978-5-901724-21-7.
