= Yuri Neprintsev =

Soviet-Russian painter

- Born: Yuri Mikhailovich Neprintsev; August 15, 1909; Tiflis, Russian Empire
- Died: October 20, 1996 (aged 87); Saint Petersburg, Russia
- Education: Repin Institute of Arts
- Movement: Socialist realism
- Awards: People's Painter of the USSR; Order of Lenin; Stalin Prize

Yuri Mikhailovich Neprintsev (Russian: Ю́рий Миха́йлович Непри́нцев; August 15, 1909 – October 20, 1996) was a Soviet and Russian painter, graphic artist, art teacher, professor of the Repin Institute of Arts, and a member of the Academy of Arts of the USSR. He is regarded by art historian Sergei V. Ivanov as one of the brightest representatives of the Leningrad School of Painting, most famous for his genre and battle paintings.

== Biography ==
Yuri Neprintsev came from nobility. His father, Mikhail Nikolayevich Neprintsev was an architect, a Honored Art Worker of Science and Technology of the Georgian SSR (1946).

In 1926, Neprintsev went to Leningrad to continue his education. In the years 1926–1930, he studied of Prof. Vasily Savinsky private art studio. In 1929, Neprintsev began to work as designer and graphic artist in the palace-museums of Leningrad and the Pushkin town. In the years 1932–1934, he worked as illustrator for magazines and publishing houses of Leningrad.

The Rest After Battle (1951)

In 1934, Neprintsev entered at the third course of painting department of the Leningrad Institute of Painting, Sculpture and Architecture. He studied of Pavel Naumov, Alexander Lubimov, and Isaak Brodsky, who 30 years ago was also a student of Vasily Savinsky.

Together with Neprintsev, in Isaak Brodsky workshop, studied such famous Russian artists as Nikolai Timkov, Piotr Belousov, Aleksandr Laktionov, Piotr Vasiliev, Mikhail Kozell, and others.

In 1938, Neprintsev graduated from Leningrad Institute of Painting, Sculpture and Architecture. His graduation work was a painting "Alexander Pushkin in Mikhailovskoe village", devoted to the memory of the Russian poet Alexander Pushkin. In 1940 Neprintsev was admitted to the Leningrad Union of Artists.

Starting in 1928, Neprintsev participated in Art Exhibitions. He painted portraits, genre and historical compositions, and landscapes. Yuri Neprintsev worked in oil painting, pencil drawings, watercolors and book illustration. Solo exhibitions by Neprintsev were in 1959 (Moscow, Leningrad, Sverdlovsk, Gorky, and Saratov), and in 1989 (Leningrad).

After graduation, Neprintsev continued his education in postgraduate institute under leadership of Prof. Rudolf Frentz and Prof. Boris Ioganson. At the same time he taught at the Department of the Drawing.

In 1941, Neprintsev voluntarily joined the Red Army. He fought in the Second World War, serving in the Baltic Fleet and being demobilized in 1946.

In the postwar years, Neprintsev created a series of paintings devoted to the heroic struggle of the Soviet people against Nazi Germany: "The Last Grenade" (1948), "Lisa Chaikina" (1949), "The Rest After Battle" (1951), "The Story of the Father" (1955).

The work of art by Yuri Neprintsev was painting "The Rest After Battle". It by means of painting skillfully expressed the idea of the spiritual unity of the people in wartime. The painting entered the golden fund of Soviet art, as one of the best embodiment of the image of Soviet man.

The original version of painting "The Rest After Battle" was given for Mao Zedong. In 1953 the second version was painted by Neprintsev for the Kremlin. In 1955 he painted the third version for the Tretyakov Gallery.

Over the 50 years, Neprintsev combined his creative activities with pedagogical work. He taught in the Leningrad Institute of Painting, Sculpture and Architecture named after Ilya Repin since 1938. He was professor of painting (1954–1996), a head of personal workshop and graphical department of Repin Institute of Arts.

In 1953, Neprintsev was elected Corresponding Member of Academy of Arts of the USSR, and in 1970 he was elected member of the Academy of Arts of the USSR.

Yuri Neprintsev was a member of the Saint Petersburg Union of Artists since 1938.

He died in Saint Petersburg at the age of 87. His paintings are in State Russian Museum, State Treryakov Gallery, in the numerous Art museums and private collections in Russia, France, England, USA, China, Ukraine, Italy, Japan, and other countries.

== Awards and honors ==
- Order of the Red Star (1944)
- Stalin Prize, 1st class (1952) – for "The Rest After Battle" painting
- Honored Art Worker of the RSFSR (1956)
- People's Painter of the RSFSR (1963)
- People's Painter of the USSR (1965)
- Order of the Red Banner of Labour (1969)
- Order of Lenin (1979)
- Order of the Patriotic War, 2nd class (1985)

== See also ==
- Fine Art of Leningrad
- Leningrad School of Painting
- List of Russian artists
- List of 20th-century Russian painters
- List of painters of Saint Petersburg Union of Artists
- Saint Petersburg Union of Artists

== Bibliography ==
- Directory of members of the Leningrad branch of Union of Artists of Russian Federation. - Leningrad: Khudozhnik RSFSR, 1987. - p. 91.
- Matthew C. Bown. Dictionary of 20th Century Russian and Soviet Painters 1900-1980s. - London: Izomar, 1998. ISBN 0-9532061-0-6, ISBN 978-0-9532061-0-0.
- Vern G. Swanson. Soviet Impressionism. - Woodbridge, England: Antique Collectors' Club, 2001. - pp. 63, 115. - 303 p. ISBN 1-85149-280-1, ISBN 978-1-85149-280-0.
- Sergei V. Ivanov. Unknown Socialist Realism. The Leningrad School. - Saint Petersburg: NP-Print Edition, 2007. – pp. 9, 15, 18–20, 27–29, 358, 359, 361, 362, 366–370, 381, 382, 384, 386–392, 394, 395, 397–403, 405, 410–423, 443, 445. ISBN 5-901724-21-6, ISBN 978-5-901724-21-7.
- Иванов С. Инвестиции в советскую живопись: ленинградская школа // Петербургские искусствоведческие тетради. Вып. 31. СПб, 2014. С.54-60.
