= People's Artist of the Russian Federation =

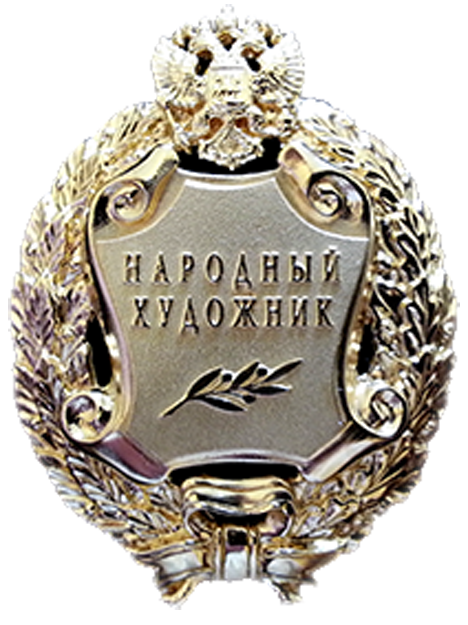
People's Artist of the Russian Federation

People's Artist of the Russian Federation (Russian: Наро́дный худо́жник Росси́йской Федера́ции) is an honorary title given no earlier than five years after the honorary title "Honored Artist of Russia" or "Honored Art Worker of Russia" to an important artist who has created extraordinary works of painting, sculpture, graphic art, monumental, decorative, crafts, music, drama, film, or television; who has made an outstanding contribution to domestic art and culture; and who has received wide public recognition. This title in succession continues the Soviet tradition: a similar level of recognition was conveyed by the USSR title of "People's Artist of the RSFSR."
