= Vecheslav Zagonek =

Russian painter

- Вячеслав Загонек
- Born: December 19, 1919; Irkutsk, East Siberia, Soviet Russia
- Died: June 24, 1994 (aged 74); Saint Petersburg, USSR
- Resting place: Literatorskiye Mostki, Saint Petersburg
- Education: Repin Institute of Arts
- Known for: Painting
- Movement: Realism
- Awards: Honored Artist of the RSFSR; People's Artist of the Russian Federation; People's Artist of the USSR

Vecheslav Frantsevich Zagonek (Russian: Вячесла́в Фра́нцевич Заго́нек; December 19, 1919 – June 24, 1994) was a Soviet painter, People's Artist of the USSR, Member of the Academy of Arts of the USSR, who lived and worked in Leningrad. He was a member of the Leningrad Union of Artists and regarded as one of the brightest representatives of the Leningrad school of painting, most famous for his lyrical landscapes and genre paintings.

== Biography ==
Vecheslav Frantsevich Zagonek was born December 19, 1919, in the city Irkutsk, East Siberia.

In 1927 Vecheslav Zagonek with parents comes to Leningrad. In 1936–1939 he studied at the Secondary Art School under All-Russian Academy of Art.

In 1939 Vecheslav Zagonek was drafted into the Red Army and took part in the Winter War and as antiaircrafter in the Great Patriotic War of the Soviet people against Nazi Germany and its allies.

After demobilization in 1945 Vecheslav Zagonek entered at the first course of Department of Painting at the Leningrad Institute of Painting, Sculpture and Architecture named after Ilya Repin, where he studied of Mikhail Bernshtein, Alexander Zaytsev, Genrikh Pavlovsky, Semion Abugov, Gleb Savinov.

In 1950 Vecheslav Zagonek graduated from the Leningrad Institute of Painting, Sculpture and Architecture in Boris Ioganson studio, together with Evgenia Antipova, Anatoli Vasiliev, Nina Veselova, Tatiana Kopnina, Nikolai Mukho, Alexander Pushnin, Alexander Sokolov, Yuri Tulin, and other young artists. His graduation work was genre painting "Spring in the collective farm".

Since 1939 Vecheslav Zagonek has participated in Art Exhibitions. He painted genre scenes, historical paintings, landscapes. Most famous for his lyrical landscapes. His personal exhibitions were in Leningrad (1966, 1990), and in Moscow (1966). In 1950 Zagonek was admitted to the Leningrad Union of Artists (since 1992 known as the Saint Petersburg Union of Artists).

Vecheslav Zagonek was awarded the honorary titles of the Honored Artist of the Russian Federation (1963), the Honored Art Worker of the Russian Federation (1968), the People's Artist of the Russian Federation (1979), and the People's Artist of the Soviet Union (1985).

In 1965 Vecheslav Zagonek was awarded a silver medal of the Academy of Arts of the USSR. In 1977 he has become a prize-winner of the Repin Prize of the Russian Federation. In 1988 Vecheslav Zagonek was elected a member of the Academy of Arts of the Soviet Union.

Vecheslav Frantsevich Zagonek died on June 24, 1994, in Saint Petersburg. His paintings reside in State Russian Museum, State Tretyakov Gallery and other Art Museums and private collections in Russia, Japan, China, Germany, Italy, and throughout the world.

== Sources ==
- Mochalov Lev. Vecheslav Frantsevich Zagonek. - Leningrad: Khudozhnik RSFSR, 1959.
- Artists of the USSR. Biography and Bibliography Dictionary. Volume 4, part 1. - Moscow: Iskusstvo, 1983. - pp. 177–178.
- Matthew C. Bown. Dictionary of 20th Century Russian and Soviet Painters 1900-1980s. - London: Izomar, 1998. ISBN 0-9532061-0-6, ISBN 978-0-9532061-0-0.
- Time for change. The Art of 1960-1985 in the Soviet Union. - Saint Petersburg: State Russian Museum, 2006. - pp. 130, 164.
- Irina Romanycheva. Academic Dacha. History and traditions. - Saint Petersburg: Petropol Publishing House, 2009. - pp. 57, 73, 93, 112.
- Sergei V. Ivanov. Unknown Socialist Realism. The Leningrad School. - Saint Petersburg: NP-Print Edition, 2007. – pp. 9, 15, 19, 20, 21, 27, 29, 30, 190, 205, 344, 350, 360, 384, 388-399, 401-404, 406, 407, 411, 413-424, 445. ISBN 5-901724-21-6, ISBN 978-5-901724-21-7.
