= Alexei Eriomin =

Russian painter

Alexei Grigorievich Eriomin
- Born: 17 March 1919; Velikaya Guba, Karelia, RSFSR
- Died: 11 June 1998 (aged 79); Saint Petersburg, Russia
- Resting place: Sestroretskoye Cemetery
- Education: Repin Institute of Arts
- Known for: Painting
- Movement: Realism
- Awards: Order of the Red Banner; Order of the Patriotic War; Order of Red Star; Honored Artist of the RSFSR; People's Artist of the Russian Federation

Alexei Grigorievich Eriomin (Russian: Алексе́й Григо́рьевич Ерё́мин; 17 March 1919 – 11 June 1998) was a Russian Soviet realist painter, People's Artist of the Russian Federation, who lived and worked in Saint Petersburg (former Leningrad). He was a member of the Saint Petersburg Union of Artists (before 1992 named as the Leningrad branch of Union of Artists of Russian Federation), and regarded as one of the representatives of the Leningrad school of painting, most famous for his paintings devoted to peoples and nature of Northern Karelia.

== Biography ==
Alexei Grigorievich Eriomin was born on 17 March 1919 in the village of Velikaya Guba, located at the shore of Onega Lake in Northern Karelia.

In 1930 Alexei Eriomin comes to Leningrad. In 1935-1939 he studied in the Leningrad Secondary Art School under All-Russian Academy of Arts.

In 1939 he was drafted into the Red Army. As a tankman Alexei Eriomin took part in the German-Soviet War of the Soviet people against Nazi Germany and its allies. He was wounded and marked by military awards.

After demobilization in 1945 Alexei Eriomin entered at the first course of Department of Painting at the Leningrad Institute of Painting, Sculpture and Architecture named after Ilya Repin, where he studied of Boris Fogel, Semion Abugov, Alexander Debler, and Alexander Zaytsev.

In 1951 Alexei Eriomin graduated from the Leningrad Institute of Painting, Sculpture and Architecture in Boris Ioganson studio, together with Nikolai Baskakov, Mikhail Kaneev, Maya Kopitseva, Anatoli Levitin, Avenir Parkhomenko, Arseny Semionov, Mikhail Trufanov, Boris Ugarov, and other young artists. His graduation work was genre painting "Lenin on the hunting in Siberian exile"

Since 1939 Alexei Eriomin has participated in Art Exhibitions. He painted genre and historical paintings, portraits, landscapes, sketches from the life. Alexei Eriomin was most famous for his paintings devoted to peoples and nature of Northern Karelija.

Since 1951 Alexei Eriomin was a member of the Leningrad Union of Artists. Alexai Eriomin was awarded the honorary titles of the Honored Artist of the RSFSR (1970), and the People's Artist of the Russian Federation (1978).

Alexei Grigorievich Eriomin died on 11 June 1998 in Saint Petersburg at the eightieth year of life. His paintings reside in State Russian Museum, State Tretyakov Gallery, in Art museums and private collections in the Russia, Japan, England, Finland, and other countries.

== Honours and awards ==
- Order of the Red Star
- Order of the Red Banner
- Medal "For the Victory over Germany in the Great Patriotic War 1941–1945"
- Order of the Patriotic War, 2nd class

== See also ==
- Fine Art of Leningrad
- Leningrad School of Painting
- List of Russian artists
- List of painters of Saint Petersburg Union of Artists
- List of the Russian Landscape painters
- Saint Petersburg Union of Artists

== Bibliography ==
- Golenky Georgy. Alexei Eriomin. Leningrad, Khudozhnik RSFSR, 1985.
- Matthew C. Bown. Dictionary of 20th Century Russian and Soviet Painters 1900-1980s. London: Izomar, 1998. ISBN 0-9532061-0-6, ISBN 978-0-9532061-0-0.
- Time for change. The Art of 1960-1985 in the Soviet Union. Saint Petersburg: State Russian Museum, 2006. p. 174.
- Sergei V. Ivanov. Unknown Socialist Realism. The Leningrad School. Saint Petersburg: NP-Print Edition, 2007. – pp. 9, 15, 18, 20, 21, 27, 29, 30, 195, 271, 360, 384, 388, 390, 392-395, 397-402, 404-407, 411, 413-424. ISBN 5-901724-21-6, ISBN 978-5-901724-21-7.
- Дмитренко А. Ф. Люблю людей… (О народном художнике России А. Г. Ерёмине) // Петербургские искусствоведческие тетради. Вып. 9. СПб, 2007. С.233—244.
- Artists of Peter's Academy of Arts and Sciences. Saint Petersburg: Ladoga Edition, 2008. - pp. 58–59.
