= Piotr Buchkin =

Russian painter (1886–1965)

Piotr Dmitrievich Buchkin
- Born: 22 January 1886; Sofronovo, Tver Governorate, Russian Empire
- Died: 21 June 1965 (aged 79); Leningrad, Soviet Union
- Education: Imperial Academy of Arts
- Known for: Painting, drawing, art teaching
- Movement: Realism

Piotr Dmitrievich Buchkin (Russian: Пё́тр Дми́триевич Бучки́н; 22 January 1886 – 21 June 1965) was a Russian painter and draughtsman, active in St. Petersburg (later Leningrad) during the Silver Age and the early Soviet era.

== Biography ==
Piotr Buchkin was born on 22 January 1886 in Sofronovo village, Tver Governorate, Russian Empire. In 1891 his family moved to the city of Uglich on the Volga River. First drawing lessons future artist had received from local icon painters.

In 1899 Piotr Buchkin comes to Saint Petersburg. He engaged in School of Technical Drawing of Baron Alexander von Stieglitz, where studied of Nikolai Koshelev.

In 1904 Piotr Buchkin entered the Higher Art School at the Imperial Academy of Fine Arts, where he studied of Vasiliy Mate and Vasily Savinsky. In 1912 he graduated from the Higher Art School at the Imperial Academy of Fine Arts in Vasily Mate personal Art studio. He received the title of the artist with the right of teaching in schools. In 1912–1914 as a pensioner of the Academy of Arts Buchkin visited Italy, France, Germany, Spain and some other countries.

Since 1907 Buchkin has participated in art exhibitions. He painted portraits, genre paintings, landscapes, worked as illustrator for the theatre magazines and books. He worked in technic of watercolor, pencil, pastels, etchings, oil and tempera paintings. In 1920s Buchkin painted from the life Vladimir Lenin and Feodor Chaliapin.

Buchkin worked across a range of painting techniques, the choice of which was typically governed by genre, the character of the subject, and compositional intent.

In 1914, Piotr Buchkin becomes a member of the Society of Artists named after Arkhip Kuindzhi. In 1918 he was elected a member of the Society of Russian watercolors. After October Revolution in 1918–1921 Peter Buchkin serves as a team gunners division submarines of the Baltic Fleet. From 1921 to early 1930 he worked as head of the technical department of the Publishing house "Rainbow" in Leningrad. In 1930–1936 years Piotr Buchkin also worked as an illustrator in publishing of Leningrad and Moscow.

In 1932 Piotr Buchkin become one of the founders of the Leningrad Union of Artists. In the years of 1936–1940 Buchkin taught at the Leningrad Institute of Painting, Sculpture and Architecture as a professor of drawing (1937). In postwar years Piotr Buchkin taught at the Vera Mukhina Art and Industry Higher School, where he was professor (1952), a Head of the Department of Monumental-Decorative Painting (1951–1955, 1962–1965). In 1956 Piotr Buchkin was awarded the honorary title of Honored Art Worker of Russian Federation. His book of memoirs, "About that in memory: Notes of an Artist" was published in 1962.

Piotr Dmitrievich Buchkin died in Leningrad in 1965. His paintings are in the State Russian Museum, State Tretyakov Gallery, and other art museums and private collections in Russia, Italy, the US, Japan, Germany, England, France, and other countries.

== See also ==
- Fine art of Leningrad
- Leningrad School of Painting
- List of painters of Saint Petersburg Union of Artists
- Saint Petersburg Union of Artists

== Publications ==
- Buchkin, Pyotr D. (1962). Brodsky, Iosif Anat. (ed.). О том, что в памяти. Записки художника (in Russian). Leningrad: Khudozhnik RSFSR.
