= Mikhail Trufanov =

Russian painter

Mikhail Pavlovich Trufanov
- Born: November 22, 1921; Nyzhnie Peny, Kursk Province, Soviet Russia
- Died: April 24, 1988 (aged 66); Leningrad, USSR
- Education: Repin Institute of Arts
- Known for: Painting
- Movement: Realism
- Awards: Honored Artist of the Russian Federation

Mikhail Pavlovich Trufanov (Russian: Михаи́л Па́влович Труфа́нов; November 22, 1921 – April 24, 1988) was a Soviet Russian painter and Honored Artist of the Russian Federation. He lived and worked in Leningrad and is regarded as one of the brightest representatives of the Leningrad school of painting, most famous for his portrait paintings.

== Biography ==
Mikhail Pavlovich Trufanov was born November 22, 1921, in village of Nyzhnie Peny, Kursk Governorate, Soviet Russia (now Rakityansky District, Belgorod Oblast) in a working-class family.

Soon the family moved to industrial city Makeevka located in eastern Ukraine within the Donetsk Province, 25 km (16 mi) from the Donetsk city. Here, Trufanov spent his childhood and teenage years. This time impressions influenced in the future on the formation of the young artist and choose the theme for his main paintings.

In 1937–1940, Trufanov studied at the Odessa Art School, which ended only after World War II in 1945. In 1941–1944, Trufanov took part in the Great Patriotic War. He was wounded and received military awards.

In 1945, Trufanov joined the painting department of the Leningrad Institute of Painting, Sculpture and Architecture named after Ilya Repin. He studied of Boris Fogel, Leonid Ovsannikov, Alexander Zaytsev.

In 1951, Trufanov graduated from Ilya Repin Institute in Boris Ioganson personal Art Studio. His graduation work was a historical painting named "In the headquarters of Kovpak", dedicated to partisan movement in the years of the Great Patriotic War.

Starting in 1951, Michael Trufanov participated in Art Exhibitions. He painted portraits, genre compositions and landscapes, and worked in oil painting, drawing and printing. Widely known artist received for the painting "Furnaceman" (1954, Tretyakov Gallery). Solo Exhibitions by Michael Trufanov was in Leningrad in 1986.

Trufanov’s Furnaceman and related works are linked to the emergence of a new heroic image of industrial workers in Soviet art of the 1950s, depicting a collective figure of laborers such as miners, steelworkers, and blast-furnace operators, and contributing to his recognition.

In 1951, Trufanov was admitted to the Leningrad Union of Artists. In 1963 he was awarded the honorary title of Honored Artist of Russian Federation.

Mikhail Pavlovich Trufanov died on April 24, 1988, in Leningrad. His paintings reside in State Russian Museum, State Tretyakov Gallery, in the lot of Art museums and private collections in Russia, England, China, Japan, in the U.S., and throughout the world.

== See also ==
- Leningrad School of Painting
- List of Russian artists
- List of 20th-century Russian painters
- List of painters of Saint Petersburg Union of Artists
- Saint Petersburg Union of Artists

== Sources ==
- Lev Mochalov. Mikhail Pavlovich Trufanov. - Leningrad: Khudozhnik RSFSR, 1965. - 48 p.
- Russian Paintings. 1989 Winter Show. - London: Roy Miles Gallery, 1989. - p. 5,43-45.
- Matthew C. Bown. Dictionary of 20th Century Russian and Soviet Painters 1900-1980s. - London: Izomar, 1998. ISBN 0-9532061-0-6, ISBN 978-0-9532061-0-0.
- Vern G. Swanson. Soviet Impressionism. - Woodbridge, England: Antique Collectors' Club, 2001. - ISBN 1-85149-280-1, ISBN 978-1-85149-280-0.
- Sergei V. Ivanov. Unknown Socialist Realism. The Leningrad School. - Saint Petersburg: NP-Print Edition, 2007. – pp. 9, 18, 20, 181, 233, 343, 344, 352, 371, 389–400, 402, 404–406, 439, 445 . ISBN 5-901724-21-6, ISBN 978-5-901724-21-7.
