= Gavriil Malysh =

Russian painter

Gavriil Kondratievich Malysh
- Born: March 25, 1907; Kitaygorodka, Ekaterinoslav Province, Ukraine, then in Russian Empire
- Died: October 25, 1998 (aged 91); Saint Petersburg, Russian Federation
- Education: Odessa Art Institute
- Known for: Painting, Watercolors
- Movement: Realism

Gavriil Kondratievich Malysh (Russian: Гаврии́л Кондра́тьевич Ма́лыш; March 25, 1907 – October 25, 1998) was a Soviet, Russian painter, watercolorist, and graphic artist, lived and worked in Saint Petersburg, regarded as one of the brightest representatives of the Leningrad school of painting, most famous for his decorative still lifes and landscapes.

== Biography ==
Malysh was born March 25, 1907, in Kitaygorodka village, near Ekaterinoslav, Ukraine, Russian Empire.

In 1934 Malysh graduated from Odessa Art Institute, where he studied of A. Gaush and T. Fraermann. Since 1935 he lived and worked in Leningrad.

Since 1954 Malysh participated in art exhibitions. He painted landscapes, still lifes, genre paintings, worked in oil painting, watercolors, and pastel. The most known as master of watercolors. Malysh's personal exhibitions were in Leningrad (1975, 1976, 1977, 1985, 1988), Saint Petersburg (1996, 1997), and Stockholm (1991).

The leading place in Malysh's art takes a lyrical landscape and decorative still life. The untiring search for the artist in the field of colors predetermined his address to the decorative painting, to the synthesis of colors, where dominated his favorite light-blue and blue, lilac, cherry and violet hues, providing major sounding painting.

Malysh was a member of the Saint Petersburg Union of Artists (before 1992 – Leningrad branch of Union of Artists of Russian Federation) since 1955.

Malysh died on October 25, 1998, in Saint Petersburg. His painting and watercolors reside in State Russian Museum, in art museums and private collections in Russia, France, Sweden, Norway, England, US, China, Japan, and other countries.

== See also ==
- Leningrad School of Painting
- List of Russian artists
- List of 20th-century Russian painters
- List of painters of Saint Petersburg Union of Artists
- List of the Russian Landscape painters
- Saint Petersburg Union of Artists

== Sources ==
- Гавриил Малыш. Живопись. (Gavriil Malysh. Painting). - Saint Petersburg: ICAR Publishing, 1994.
- Sergei V. Ivanov. Unknown Socialist Realism. The Leningrad School. - Saint Petersburg: NP-Print Edition, 2007. – pp. 24, 364, 390–397, 399, 400, 403, 405, 407, 439, 443, 445. ISBN 5-901724-21-6, ISBN 978-5-901724-21-7.
