= Piotr Belousov =

Russian painter

Piotr Petrovich Belousov
- Born: 3 May 1912; Berdiansk, Taurida Governorate, Russian Empire
- Died: 31 March 1989 (aged 76); Leningrad, Russian SFSR, Soviet Union
- Resting place: Literatorskiye Mostki, Saint Petersburg
- Education: Isaak Brodsky
- Known for: Painting, Graphics, Art teaching
- Movement: Realism
- Awards: Honored Artist of the RSFSR, People's Artist of the Russian Federation

Piotr Petrovich Belousov (Russian: Пётр Петро́вич Белоу́сов; 3 May 1912 – 31 March 1989) was a Soviet Ukrainian and Russian graphic artist, painter, art teacher, professor of the Ilya Repin Leningrad Institute of Painting, Sculpture and Architecture, and a corresponding member of the Academy of Arts of the USSR, who lived and worked in Leningrad. He was regarded as one of the brightest representatives of the Leningrad School of Painting, being most famous for his portraits and historical paintings.

== Biography ==
Piotr Petrovich Belousov was born on 3 May 1912 in the port city of Berdiansk, located on the northern coast of the Sea of Azov, of south-east Ukraine, Russian Empire.

In 1929, Belousov met with Brodsky and by his invitation came to Leningrad to continue his study. He engaged in drawing and painting under Brodsky's leadership, as well as in the studio AKhRs and the Community of Artists.

In 1933, Belousov entered the first course of the painting department of the Leningrad Institute of Painting, Sculpture and Architecture. He studied under Mikhail Bernshtein, Pavel Naumov, Alexander Lubimov, and Vladimir Serov.

In 1939, Belousov graduated from the Repin Institute of Arts in Isaak Brodsky workshop together with Aleksei Gritsai, Lev Orekhov, Mikhail Kozell, Gleb Verner, Elena Skuin, Nikolai Timkov, Boris Sherbakov, and other young artists. His graduation work was the historical painting of "On the eve of [the] October Revolution (Meeting of Lenin and Stalin)".

Since 1930, Belousov had participated in Art Exhibitions. He painted genre and historical paintings, portraits, landscapes, worked in easel painting and drawings. He is most famous for his portraits and historical paintings devoted to the image of Lenin, the history of Bolshevism and the October Revolution in Russia. His personal exhibitions were in the city of Vologda in 1959, and in Moscow in 1982.

Since 1940, Belousov had been a member of the Leningrad Union of Artists. In 1939–1989, Belousov taught painting and drawing in the Repin Institute of Arts. He was Professor and Head of Department of Drawing since 1956. In 1970, he was awarded the honorary titles of the Honoured Worker of the Arts Industry of the RSFSR, in 1978 the People's Artist of the RSFSR (visual arts). Also, Belousov was elected as the Corresponding Member of the Academy of Arts of the USSR (1979).

Belousov died in Leningrad in 1989. Paintings by Piotr Belousov reside in State Russian Museum, State Tretyakov Gallery, in Art Museums and private collections in Russia, Ukraine, England, France, the U.S., and throughout the world.

== See also ==
- Leningrad School of Painting
- List of Russian artists
- List of 20th-century Russian painters
- List of painters of Saint Petersburg Union of Artists
- Saint Petersburg Union of Artists

== Bibliography ==
- S. Ivensky. Piotr Petrovich Belousov. – Leningrad: Khudozhnik RSFSR, 1959. – 40 p.
- Artists of the USSR. Biography Dictionary. Volume 1. – Moscow: Iskusstvo Edition, 1970. – p. 346.
- Russian Paintings. 1989 Winter Show. – London: Roy Miles Gallery, 1989. – p. 5,16–17.
- Charmes Russes. Auction Catalogue. – Paris: Drouot Richelieu, 15 Mai 1991. – p. 38.
- L' Ecole de Saint-Petersburg. Catalogue. – Paris: Drouot Richelieu, 25 Janvier 1993.
- Matthew C. Bown. Dictionary of 20th Century Russian and Soviet Painters 1900-1980s. – London: Izomar 1998. ISBN 0-9532061-0-6, ISBN 987-0-9532061-0-0.
- Vern G. Swanson. Soviet Impressionism. – Woodbridge, England: Antique Collectors' Club, 2001. – p. 87,216,274. ISBN 1-85149-280-1, ISBN 978-1-85149-280-0.
- Sergei V. Ivanov. Unknown Socialist Realism. The Leningrad School. – Saint Petersburg: NP-Print Edition, 2007. – p. 9, 13, 15, 19, 26, 28, 357–359, 363–365, 369, 382, 384, 386, 388–393, 396, 399–401, 403–405, 407, 411, 413–415, 419–424, 445. ISBN 5-901724-21-6, ISBN 987-5-901724-21-7.
