= Paintings of 1940–1990s: the Leningrad School =

1996 art exhibition in Saint Petersburg, Russia

Fine Art Exhibition "Painting of 1940–1990s. The Leningrad School"
- Year: 1996
- Location: Saint Petersburg, Russia Nikolai Nekrasov Memorial Museum

Retrospective Exhibition "Painting of 1940–1990s. The Leningrad School" (Russian: Живопись 1940-1990 годов. Ленинградская школа (выставка, 1996)) was one of the most notable events in the Saint Petersburg exhibition live of 1996. The exhibition took place at the Memorial Museum of Nikolai A. Nekrasov.

== History and Organization ==
The exhibition opened on March 2, and ran until 3 April, 1997. A catalog was published for the exhibition.

== Contributing Artists ==
The exhibition included 93 artworks from 50 painters of the Leningrad School:

- Taisia Afonina
- Piotr Alberti
- Vsevolod Bazhenov
- Irina Baldina
- Yuri Belov
- Veniamin Borisov
- Vladimir Chekalov
- Evgeny Chuprun
- Nikolai Galakhov
- Tatiana Gorb
- Abram Grushko
- Alexei Eriomin
- Mikhail Kaneev
- Maya Kopitseva
- Marina Kozlovskaya
- Boris Korneev
- Alexander Koroviakov
- Mikhail Kozell
- Vladimir Krantz
- Ivan Lavsky
- Boris Lavrenko
- Piotr Litvinsky
- Vladimir Malevsky
- Valentina Monakhova
- Mikhail Natarevich
- Piotr Nazarov
- Anatoli Nenartovich
- Samuil Nevelshtein
- Sergei Osipov
- Vladimir Ovchinnikov
- Lev Orekhov
- Victor Otiev
- Nikolai Pozdneev
- Evgeny Pozdniakov
- Galina Rumiantseva
- Kapitolina Rumiantseva
- Lev Russov
- Alexander Samokhvalov
- Alexander Semionov
- Nadezhda Shteinmiller
- Elena Skuin
- German Tatarinov
- Nikolai Timkov
- Mikhail Tkachev
- Leonid Tkachenko
- Anatoli Vasiliev
- Piotr Vasiliev
- Nina Veselova
- Rostislav Vovkushevsky
- Vecheslav Zagonek
- Ruben Zakharian

== Contributed Artworks ==
For the Exhibition were selected art works created in 1950-1980s. Some of them had been exhibited before, while other paintings were shown for the first time.

Genre painting was represented by the works of "Ica Cream Vender" by Veniamin Borisov, "At the Summer Bath house" by Maya Kopitseva, "Spring in the City" by Piotr Litvinsky, "Gas pipeline laying" and "Asphalt laying works" by Anatoli Nenartovich, "Spring Day" by Nikolai Pozdneev, "Station Baikal. At the pier" by Anatoli Vasiliev, and some others.

Portrait painting was represented by the works of "Junior Sergeant" by Vladimir Chekalov, "Schoolgirl" by Tatiana Gorb, "In summer at reading" by Nikolai Pozdneev, "In the Sun" by Alexander Samokhvalov, "Old Man" by Leonid Tkachenko, and some others.

Landscape and Cityscape painting was represented by the works of "Windy Day" by Irina Baldina, "Winter Tale" and "Arabian coast" by Vsevolod Bazhenov, "Be a full wind" and "Near Kostroma City" by Evgeny Chuprun, "On the Volga River" and "Somewhere in Karelia" by Nikolai Galakhov, "Autumn Road" by Mikhail Kozell, "Izborsk Fortress" by Sergei Osipov, "Wave. Caspian Sea" and "Old Ladoga" by Vladimir Ovchinnikov, "Little street" by Nikolai Timkov, "Silhouettes Gurzuf" by Ruben Zakharian, and some others.

Still life painting was represented by the works of "Roses" by Samuil Nevelshtein, "Still life with Pussy-Willows" by Taisia Afonina, "Still life with yellow material" by Rostislav Vovkushevsky, "A Lilac" by Kapitolina Rumiantseva, and some others.

== Reception ==
The exhibition was widely covered in the press and in literature specialized in Soviet fine art.

== See also ==
- Fine Art of Leningrad
- Leningrad School of Painting
- Saint Petersburg Union of Artists
- Socialist realism
