= Etude in Leningrad painting of 1940–1980s =

1994–1995 art exhibition in St. Petersburg, Russia

Rain passed
- Artist: Vladimir Ovchinnikov
- Year: 1961
- Location: private collection; Russia

Retrospective Exhibition "Etude in Leningrad painting of 1940–1980s" (Russian: Этюд в творчестве ленинградских художников. Живопись 1950-1980-х годов) became one of the most notable event in the Saint Petersburg exhibition life of 1994–1995. The Exhibition took place in Nikolai Nekrasov Memorial Museum, located in the historical apartment on Liteyny Prospekt, 36. 143 art works of 61 painters from the Leningrad School of Painting were presented, largely from private collections.

== History and Organization ==
Exhibition was opened on December 9, 1994, and continued up to January 20, 1995. A catalog was published afterwards.

== Contributing Artists ==
There were exhibited art works of 61 painters of the Leningrad School: Taisia Afonina, Piotr Alberti, Evgenia Antipova, Irina Baldina, Vsevolod Bazhenov, Veniamin Borisov, Zlata Bizova, Vladimir Chekalov, Evgeny Chuprun, Nikolai Galakhov, Tatiana Gorb, Abram Grushko, Alexei Eriomin, Mikhail Kaneev, Yuri Khukhrov, Maya Kopitseva, Boris Korneev, Alexander Koroviakov, Elena Kostenko, Mikhail Kozell, Marina Kozlovskaya, Boris Lavrenko, Ivan Lavsky, Piotr Litvinsky, Dmitry Maevsky, Valentina Monakhova, Alexei Mozhaev, Nikolai Mukho, Mikhail Natarevich, Alexander Naumov, Anatoli Nenartovich, Dmitry Oboznenko, Lev Orekhov, Sergei Osipov, Vladimir Ovchinnikov, Victor Otiev, Nikolai Pozdneev, Evgeny Pozdniakov, Galina Rumiantseva, Kapitolina Rumiantseva, Lev Russov, Alexander Samokhvalov, Alexander Semionov, Nadezhda Shteinmiller, German Tatarinov, Nikolai Timkov, Mikhail Tkachev, Leonid Tkachenko, Anatoli Vasiliev, Piotr Vasiliev, Lazar Yazgur, Vecheslav Zagonek, Ruben Zakharian, and some other artists.

== Contributed Artworks ==
Art works presented at the exhibition were created between 1950s-1980s. Some of them were exhibited before, and some were shown in the first time. The exhibition presented the development of etude painting in the works of Leningrad artists of the second half of the twentieth century.

Genre painting was represented of "Girl in a Boat" by Piotr Alberti, "Ice-cream vender" by Veniamin Borisov, "Samarkand bazaar", "Midday in Urgut" by Valentina Monakhova, "A Youth" by Mikhail Natarevich, "Gas pipeline laying" by Anatoli Nenartovich, "Gursuf. Mooring" by Lev Orekhov, "Rain passed" by Vladimir Ovchinnikov, "In Summer at reading" by Nikolai Pozdneev, "Sunny Day" by Nadezhda Shteinmiller, "May-day on the Vasilievsky Island" by Leonid Tkachenko, "On the motor vessel. Kama River" by Anatoli Vasiliev, "Fishermen on Issyk-Kul Lake" by Vecheslav Zagonek, and some others.

Portrait painting was represented of "Hutsul Woman" by Taisia Afonina, "Schoolgirl" by Tatiana Gorb, "Girl with plaits" by Alexei Mozhaev, "Girl in panama hat" by Galina Rumiantseva, "Zoya" by Lev Russov, "In the Sun" by Alexander Samokhvalov, "The Young Azerbaijani" by Leonid Tkachenko, "Junior sergeant" by Vladimir Chekalov, and some others.

Landscape and Cityscape painting was represented of "In Crimea Mountain" by Evgenia Antipova, "In the Singapore Strait", "Spring on the Volkhov River" by Vsevolod Bazhenov, "Windy Day" by Irina Baldina, "Northern Spring" by Nikolai Galakhov, "Riverside" by Alexei Eriomin, "Autumn road", "Autumn in Pargolovo" by Mikhail Kozell, "Main street in Biysk" by Boris Korneev, "Autumn garden" by Alexander Koroviakov, "Samarkand. Registan" by Alexander Naumov, "A Winter" by Dmitry Oboznenko, "Evening on the Dnieper River", "Moonlight night on the Volga River" by Vladimir Ovchinnikov, "Pskov Courtyard", "Landscape with small bridge" by Sergei Osipov, "Boats on the shore" by Nadezhda Shteinmiller, "Kostroma. Winter evening" by Leonid Tkachenko, and some others.

Still life painting was represented of "Still life with Water-Mellon" by Piotr Alberti, "Flowers on the Table" by Lev Russov, "Late Lilac" by Piotr Vasiliev, and some others.

== Acknowledgment ==
Exhibition was widely covered in press and in literature on Soviet fine art.

== See also ==
- Fine Art of Leningrad
- In the Sun (painting of Alexander N. Samokhvalov)
- Soviet art
- Leningrad School of Painting
- Saint Petersburg Union of Artists
- Socialist realism

== Sources ==
- Иванов С. Этюд в багровых тонах // Санкт-Петербургские ведомости, 1994, 9 декабря.
- Этюд в творчестве ленинградских художников. Живопись 1950–1980 годов. Каталог. СПб., 1994.
- Справочник членов Ленинградской организации Союза художников РСФСР. Л., Художник РСФСР, 1987.
- Художники народов СССР. Биографический словарь. Т.1-4. М., Искусство, 1970–1995.
- Справочник членов Союза художников СССР. Том 1,2. М., Советский художник, 1979.
- Sergei V. Ivanov. Unknown Socialist Realism. The Leningrad School. Saint Petersburg: NP-Print Edition, 2007. P.404, 422. ISBN 5-901724-21-6, ISBN 978-5-901724-21-7
- Юбилейный справочник выпускников Санкт-Петербургского академического института живописи, скульптуры и архитектуры имени И. Е. Репина Российской Академии художеств. 1915–2005. СПб., Первоцвет, 2007.
