= 1971 in fine arts of the Soviet Union =

The year 1971 was marked by many events that left an imprint on the history of Soviet and Russian Fine Arts.

== Events ==
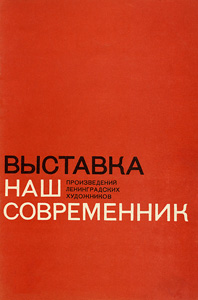
Exhibition Catalog

- The Spring Exhibition of work by Leningrad artists of 1971 was opened in the Leningrad Union of Artists. The participants were Evgenia Antipova, Veniamin Borisov, Nikolai Galakhov, Boris Korneev, Mikhail Kozell, Elena Kostenko, Vladimir Krantz, Ivan Lavsky, Efim Liatsky, Dmitry Maevsky, Gavriil Malish, Vera Nazina, Yuri Neprintsev, Dmitry Oboznenko, Vladimir Ovchinnikov, Ivan Savenko, Alexander Semionov, Alexander Shmidt, Leonid Tkachenko, Nikolai Timkov, Yuri Tulin, Valery Vatenin, Vecheslav Zagonek, Ruben Zakharian, and other important Leningrad artists.
- Exhibition of Leningrad artists named «Our Contemporary» was opened in Russian museum in Leningrad. The participants were Nikolai Baskakov, Yuri Belov, Olga Bogaevskaya, Tatiana Gorb, Irina Dobrekova, Alexei Eriomin, Yuri Khukhrov, Anna Kostrova, Engels Kozlov, Boris Lavrenko, Oleg Lomakin, Dmitry Maevsky, Gavriil Malish, Boris Maluev, Evsey Moiseenko, Vera Nazina, Lev Orekhov, Victor Oreshnikov, Lija Ostrova, Victor Otiev, Nikolai Pozdneev, Semion Rotnitsky, Alexander Shmidt, Igor Suvorov, Alexander Tatarenko, Nikolai Timkov, Mikhail Trufanov, Yuri Tulin, Vitaly Tulenev, Alexander Shmidt, Boris Ugarov, Valery Vatenin, Igor Veselkin, and other important Leningrad artists.
- December 10 — The Fall Exhibition of work by Leningrad artists of 1971 was opened in the Leningrad Union of Artists. The participants were Piotr Alberti, Nikolai Brandt, Dmitry Buchkin, Ivan Varichev, Valery Vatenin, Alexander Vedernikov, Gleb Verner, Nikolai Galakhov, Ivan Godlevsky, Vladimir Gorb, Tatiana Gorb, Irina Dobrekova, German Egoshin, Vecheslav Zagonek, Sergei Zakharov, Ruben Zakharian, Mikhail Kaneev, Mikhail Kozell, Engels Kozlov, Maya Kopitseva, Boris Korneev, Elena Kostenko, Nikolai Kostrov, Yaroslav Krestovsky, Gevork Kotiantz, Vladimir Krantz, Ivan Lavsky, Oleg Lomakin, Dmitry Maevsky, Gavriil Malish, Vera Nazina, Mikhail Natarevich, Alexander Naumov, Yaroslav Nikolaev, Dmitry Oboznenko, Sergei Osipov, Nikolai Pozdneev, Kapitolina Rumiantseva, Ivan Savenko, Vladimir Seleznev, Alexander Semionov, Arseny Semionov, Elena Skuin, German Tatarinov, Nikolai Timkov, Mikhail Tkachev, Leonid Tkachenko, Yuri Tulin, Vitaly Tulenev, Sergei Frolov, Boris Shamanov, and other important Leningrad artists.

== Deaths ==
- January 23 — Vasily Vikulov (Russian: Викулов Василий Иванович), Russian soviet painter (born 1904).
- May 8 — Lev Britanishsky (Russian: Британишский Лев Романович), Russian soviet painter and graphic artist (born 1897).
- August 20 — Alexander Samokhvalov (Russian: Самохвалов Александр Николаевич), Russian soviet painter, graphic artist, book illustrator, Honored Art worker of the Russian Federation (born 1894).
- October 12 — Alexander Segal (Russian: Сегал Александр Израилевич), Russian soviet painter and theatre artist (born 1905).
- October 19 — Maria Fedoricheva (Russian: Федоричева Мария Александровна), Russian soviet painter (born 1895).
- December 9 — Sergey Konenkov (Russian: Конёнков Сергей Тимофеевич), Russian soviet sculptor, People's Artist of the USSR, Hero of Socialist Labour, Stalin Prize winner (born 1874).
- December 19 — Elena Ivanova-Eberling (Russian: Иванова-Эберлинг Елена Александровна), Russian soviet painter (born 1905).

== See also ==
- List of Russian artists
- List of painters of Leningrad Union of Artists
- Saint Petersburg Union of Artists
- Russian culture

== Sources ==
- Богданов А. О нашем современнике // Вечерний Ленинград, 1971, 5 апреля.
- Осенняя традиционная // Ленинградская правда, 1971, 11 декабря.
- Слава русского искусства // Ленинградская правда, 1971, 11 декабря.
- Богданов А. Ярче показывать жизнь // Вечерний Ленинград, 1971, 21 декабря.
- Вьюнова И. Мерой времени // Ленинградская правда, 1971, 31 декабря.
- Весенняя выставка произведений ленинградских художников 1971 года. Каталог. Л., Художник РСФСР, 1972.
- «Наш современник». Каталог выставки произведений ленинградских художников 1971 года. Л., Художник РСФСР, 1972.
- Каталог Осенней выставки произведений ленинградских художников 1971 года. Л., Художник РСФСР, 1973.
- Artists of Peoples of the USSR. Biography Dictionary. Vol. 1. Moscow, Iskusstvo, 1970.
- Artists of Peoples of the USSR. Biography Dictionary. Vol. 2. Moscow, Iskusstvo, 1972.
- Directory of Members of Union of Artists of USSR. Volume 1,2. Moscow, Soviet Artist Edition, 1979.
- Directory of Members of the Leningrad branch of the Union of Artists of Russian Federation. Leningrad, Khudozhnik RSFSR, 1980.
- Artists of Peoples of the USSR. Biography Dictionary. Vol. 4 Book 1. Moscow, Iskusstvo, 1983.
- Directory of Members of the Leningrad branch of the Union of Artists of Russian Federation. - Leningrad: Khudozhnik RSFSR, 1987.
- Artists of peoples of the USSR. Biography Dictionary. Vol. 4 Book 2. - Saint Petersburg: Academic project humanitarian agency, 1995.
- Link of Times: 1932 - 1997. Artists - Members of Saint Petersburg Union of Artists of Russia. Exhibition catalogue. - Saint Petersburg: Manezh Central Exhibition Hall, 1997.
- Matthew C. Bown. Dictionary of 20th Century Russian and Soviet Painters 1900-1980s. - London: Izomar, 1998.
- Vern G. Swanson. Soviet Impressionism. - Woodbridge, England: Antique Collectors' Club, 2001.
- Время перемен. Искусство 1960—1985 в Советском Союзе. СПб., Государственный Русский музей, 2006.
- Sergei V. Ivanov. Unknown Socialist Realism. The Leningrad School. - Saint-Petersburg: NP-Print Edition, 2007. - ISBN 5-901724-21-6, ISBN 978-5-901724-21-7.
- Anniversary Directory graduates of Saint Petersburg State Academic Institute of Painting, Sculpture, and Architecture named after Ilya Repin, Russian Academy of Arts. 1915 - 2005. - Saint Petersburg: Pervotsvet Publishing House, 2007.
