= Autumn exhibition (Leningrad, 1958) =

Soviet art exhibition

Autumn Fine Art Exhibition. Leningrad, 1958. Catalog
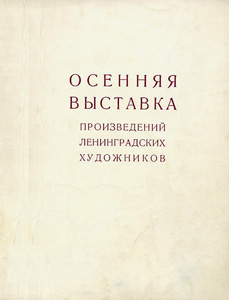
- Year: 1958
- Location: Leningrad Union of Artists Exhibition Halls; Leningrad

The Autumn Exhibition (Leningrad, 1958) (in full the Autumn Fine Art Exhibition of Leningrad Artists (Leningrad, 1958), Russian: Осенняя выставка произведений ленинградских художников 1958 года) was one of the largest Soviet art exhibitions of 1958 and of the whole of the early Khrushchev Thaw. The exhibition took place in the Leningrad Union of Soviet Artists Exhibition Halls at Bolshaya Morskaya st. 38.

== History and organization ==
The Autumn Exhibition lasted from October to November 1958. Its organization and preparation was carried out by a specially formed exhibition committee of authoritative art experts. An exhibition catalog was published. The exhibition displayed almost 1,600 works by painters, sculptors, graphic artists, theater and cinema artists, and masters of arts and crafts. It was attended by 510 Leningrad artists.

== Contributing artists ==
In the Department of Painting, the exhibition's largest section, the works of 232 artists were displayed. The artists were Taisia Afonina, Irina Baldina, Leonid Baykov, Evgenia Baykova, Vsevolod Bazhenov, Piotr Belousov, Yuri Belov, Zlata Bizova, Nikolai Brandt, Sergei Frolov, Nikolai Galakhov, Elena Gorokhova, Abram Grushko, Alexei Eriomin, Mikhail Kaneev, Maria Kleschar-Samokhvalova, Marina Kozlovskaya, Tatiana Kopnina, Boris Korneev, Alexander Koroviakov, Elena Kostenko, Nikolai Kostrov, Anna Kostrova, Gevork Kotiantz, Yaroslav Krestovsky, Valeria Larina, Boris Lavrenko, Ivan Lavsky, Piotr Litvinsky, Oleg Lomakin, Dmitry Maevsky, Gavriil Malish, Alexei Mozhaev, Evsey Moiseenko, Nikolai Mukho, Anatoli Nenartovich, Yuri Neprintsev, Dmitry Oboznenko, Sergei Osipov, Vladimir Ovchinnikov, Genrikh Pavlovsky, Varlen Pen, Nikolai Pozdneev, Stepan Privedentsev, Alexander Pushnin, Maria Rudnitskaya, Galina Rumiantseva, Lev Russov, Ivan Savenko, Gleb Savinov, Alexander Samokhvalov, Arseny Semionov, Alexander Semionov, Yuri Shablikin, Boris Shamanov, Alexander Shmidt, Nadezhda Shteinmiller, Elena Skuin, Alexander Sokolov, Nikolai Timkov, Yuri Tulin, Ivan Varichev, Anatoli Vasiliev, Piotr Vasiliev, Igor Veselkin, Vecheslav Zagonek, and other prominent painters of the Leningrad School.

In the Department of Sculptures the works of 57 sculptors were exhibited, while in the Department of Graphics the creations of 104 artists were displayed.

== Contributed artworks ==
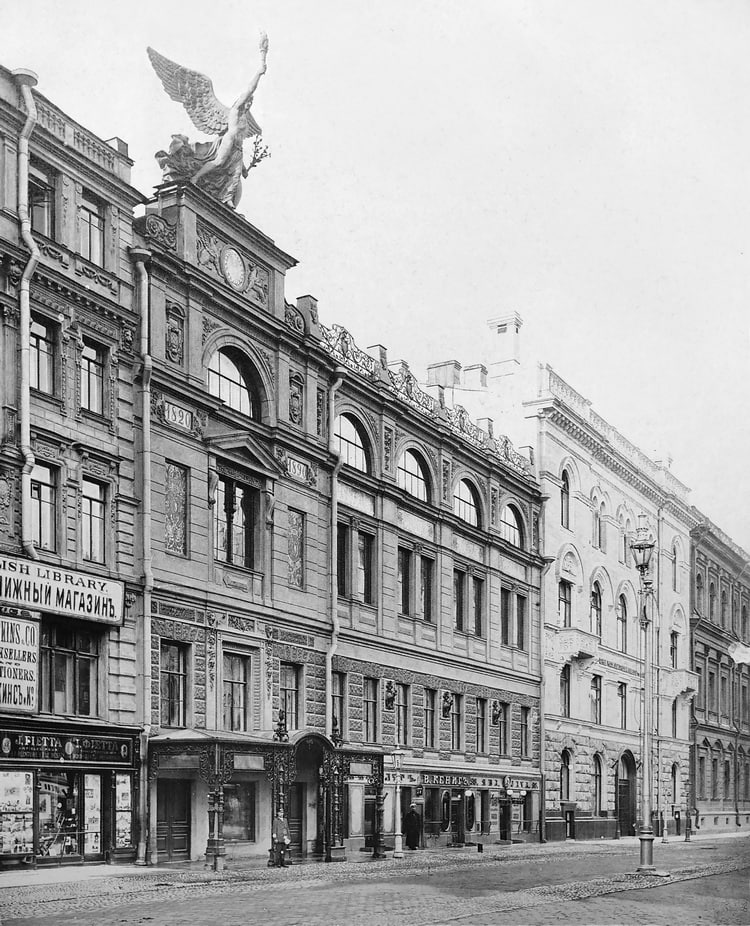
The building of the Leningrad Union of Soviet Artists on Bolshaya Morskaya st. (formerly, the Imperial Society for the Encouragement of the Arts (1912)

Many of the artworks were specifically created in 1958 for the exhibition, and some earlier works were also displayed. All of the pieces were exhibited in the first time. Some of them were subsequently shown in the collections of other Soviet art museums, as well as in domestic and foreign galleries and collections.

- Portraits: these included Portrait of the composer Reinhold Gliere by Mikhail Anikushin, Portrait of a young doctor by Elena Kostenko, A Boy by Evsey Moiseenko, and Natasha by Lev Russov.
- Genre painting: this included Night grazing horses by Nikolai Brandt, Girlfriends by Elena Gorokhova, and Laying of heating plants by Anatoli Nenartovich.
- Landscape and Cityscape: this included Near Rezan by Taisia Afonina, Autumn on the Volga River and Northern village by Nikolai Galakhov, and Drops by Vecheslav Zagonek.
- Still life paintings: these included A Rowan by Evgenia Baykova, Still life by Tatiana Kopnina, and Peonies by Elena Skuin.

== Coverage ==
The exhibition was widely covered in press and in literature on Soviet fine art.

== See also ==
- Fine Art of Leningrad
- Leningrad School of Painting
- 1956 in fine arts of the Soviet Union
- Saint Petersburg Union of Artists
- Socialist realism

== Sources ==
- Ковтун Е. Заметки о художественной выставке // Вечерний Ленинград, 1958, 29 ноября.
- Шумова М. Не уступать завоёванных рубежей. Осенняя выставка работ ленинградских художников // Ленинградская правда, 1958, 2 декабря.
- Осенняя выставка произведений ленинградских художников 1958 года. Каталог. Л., Художник РСФСР, 1959.
- Выставки советского изобразительного искусства. Справочник. Т.5. 1954—1958 годы. М., Советский художник, 1981. C.385-387.
- Справочник членов Ленинградской организации Союза художников РСФСР. Л., Художник РСФСР, 1980.
- Художники народов СССР. Биобиблиографический словарь. Т.1-4. М., Искусство, 1970-1995.
- Справочник членов Союза художников СССР. Том 1,2. М., Советский художник, 1979.
- Sergei V. Ivanov. Unknown Socialist Realism. The Leningrad School.- Saint Petersburg: NP-Print Edition, 2007. P.391. ISBN 5-901724-21-6, ISBN 978-5-901724-21-7
- Юбилейный Справочник выпускников Санкт-Петербургского академического института живописи, скульптуры и архитектуры имени И. Е. Репина Российской Академии художеств. 1915—2005. СПб., Первоцвет, 2007.
