= Nikolai Pozdneev =

Russian painter (1930–1978)

- Николай Позднеев
- Born: 28 September 1930; Leningrad, Russian SFSR, Soviet Union
- Died: 10 June 1978 (aged 47); Leningrad, Russian SFSR, Soviet Union
- Education: Repin Institute of Arts
- Known for: Painting
- Movement: Realism

Nikolai Matveevich Pozdneev (Russian: Николай Матвеевич Позднеев; 28 September 1930 – 10 June 1978) was a Soviet Russian painter, living and working in Leningrad, a member of the Leningrad Union of Artists, representative of the Leningrad School of Painting, most known for his genre and still life paintings.

== Biography ==
Pozdneev was born in Leningrad. His father taught mathematics at the Leningrad Institute of Railroad Transport Engineers.

Spring Day. 1959

In 1946 Pozdneev entered the famous Secondary Art School at the Institute of Painting, Sculpture and Architecture named after Ilya Repin where he studied with Vladimir Gorb and Mikhail Bernshtein. In 1950, after graduating from the Secondary Art School Pozdneev was adopted for the first course of the painting department of Repin Institute of Arts. His teachers were Alexander Debler, Elena Tabakova, Andrei Mylnikov, Vladislav Anisovich.

In 1956 Nikolai Pozdneev graduated from the Repin Institute of Arts in Victor Oreshnikov art workshop. His graduation work was genre painting From the School, dedicated to the theme of childhood, very popular in Soviet art of middle and end of 1950s (currently in the collection of Pskov Art Gallery). In one year with Pozdneev Institute graduates Engels Kozlov, Yaroslav Krestovsky, Piotr Nazarov, Anatoli Nenartovich, Leonid Fokin, Vsevolod Petrov-Maslakov, Lenina Guley, and other young artists who later became famous Soviet painters and art educators.

Graduation picture had opened a series of Pozdneev's works of late 1950 – early 1960s dedicated of childhood theme. Among them some of his most known paintings Spring Day (1959), Natasha in Baby-carriage (1960), A Fall Day (1961).

After graduation, Pozdneev painted under contracts with the Leningrad branch of the Art Fund of the Russian Federation. At the same time he worked creatively, trying his hand at various genres. In 1956, he had participated in the exhibition of Leningrad artists. The very first showed his art works brought him from the Academicheskaya Dacha attracted the attention of original snapping manner of paint and the special vision of color. He painted genre scenes, portraits in exterior and interior, landscapes, still lifes, sketches from the life. In 1957 Nikolai Pozdneev was admitted to the Leningrad Union of Artists.

All the subsequent bright, brief, and dramatic fate of Nikolai Pozdneev was associated with the surroundings of the Academic Dacha and Tver lands. He had lived and worked in village of Maliy Gorodok in the house of his wife Vera Vasilievna. In the nearby villages lived Nikolai Timkov, Maya Kopitseva, Alexander Romanichev, Vecheslav Zagonek, Anatoli Vasiliev, Anatoli Levitin, Dmitry Maevsky, Vladimir Tokarev, and many other artists from the Leningrad and Moscow.

In the 1960s and 1970s, Nikolai Pozdneev's schedule was divided between a city period from late fall through April and a countryside period from April to November. The city period involved securing art contracts, attending art exhibitions, participating in the Artists' Union, and maintaining contact with peers at the city art studio. The summer period was dedicated to painting from life.

Living and working at the "Academichka", Nikolai Pozdneev not only created many of his finest works but also developed a distinctive personal style that made his art stand out within the Leningrad Union of Artists.

Pictures painted in the late 1950s – the first half of 1960 pushed Pozdneev of the leading painters of Leningrad. Among them such works as A Spring (1957), In the spring, A Bakery, Across the river, Spring sketch (all 1958), Mushrooms. Still Life, A Spring, Kisharino village, A Spring Day, In summer at reading (all 1959), A Summer, Natasha in baby-carriage, Northern Bazaar, A House at the road, Grandmother's House, Two Old Ladies (all 1960), A Summer, Already spring, A Porch, Autumn day (all 1961), Baskets (1962), Defoliation (1963), Still Life in grass, Shelf, Bullfinchs, Smoked vobla, At the lawn, At the aunt Sasha, Rowan-tree (all 1964), Shelf (1966), and others.

In 1960-1970s Pozdneev trips to Kandalaksha, Ural Region along the banks of Chusovaya River and Vyatka River, working in the houses of artistic creation in Goryachy Klyuch, Staraya Ladoga, Academicheskaya Dacha. In 1967 Pozdneev was awarded the Medal of All-Union Art Exhibition, devoted to 50th Anniversary of Soviet state. In the late 1960s and 1970s artist created the works Before the fishing season, At the kitchen, Red Stones (all 1967), In Art Studio, Tea Time (both 1969), Still Life with Onions, Still Life with Vegetables (1971), Houses (1972), Winter Landscape (1975), Barents Sea, On the hill (weather station) (both 1977), and others.

Nikolai Pozdneev died on 10 June 1978 in Leningrad in an accident at age 47. His paintings reside in the Russian Museum, in other museums and private collections in Russia, USA, France, Japan, and other countries.

== Principal exhibitions ==
- 1957 (Leningrad): 1917–1957. Leningrad Artist's works of Art Exhibition
- 1957 (Moscow): All-Union Art Exhibition of 1957 dedicated to the 40th Anniversary of October Revolution
- 1960 (Leningrad): Exhibition of works by Leningrad artists of 1960
- 1961 (Leningrad): Exhibition of works by Leningrad artists of 1961
- 1962 (Leningrad): The Fall Exhibition of works by Leningrad artists of 1962
- 1964 (Leningrad): The Leningrad Fine Arts Exhibition
- 1965 (Leningrad): Spring Exhibition of works by Leningrad artists of 1965
- 1967 (Moscow): Soviet Russia the Third National Art Exhibition of 1967
- 1971 (Leningrad): Our Contemporary Exhibition of works by Leningrad artists of 1971
- 1972 (Leningrad): By Native Country Art Exhibition dedicated to 50th Anniversary of USSR
- 1975 (Leningrad): Our Contemporary regional exhibition of Leningrad artists of 1975
- 1976 (Moscow): The Fine Arts of Leningrad
- 1977 (Leningrad): Art belongs to the people. Anniversary Exhibition of Leningrad artists dedicated to 60th Anniversary of Great October Revolution of 1917
- 1994 (Saint Petersburg): Paintings of 1950-1980s by the Leningrad School artists
- 1994 (Saint Petersburg): Etude in creativity of the Leningrad School's artists
- 1995 (Saint Petersburg): Lyrical motifs in postwar Leningrad painting
- 1996 (Saint Petersburg): Paintings of 1940-1990s. The Leningrad School
- 1997 (Saint Petersburg): "Still life in Painting of 1950-1990s. The Leningrad School"

== See also ==
- Spring Day (painting)
- Fine Art of Leningrad
- Leningrad School of Painting
- List of Russian artists
- Saint Petersburg Union of Artists
- Academicheskaya Dacha

== Bibliography ==
- 1917–1957. Выставка произведений ленинградских художников. Каталог. Л., Ленинградский художник, 1958. С.26.
- Всесоюзная художественная выставка, посвящённая 40-летию Великой Октябрьской социалистической революции. Каталог. М., Советский художник, 1957. С.60.
- Осенняя выставка произведений ленинградских художников 1958 года. Каталог. Л., Художник РСФСР, 1959. С.22.
- Выставка произведений ленинградских художников 1960 года. Каталог. Л., Художник РСФСР, 1963. С.16.
- Выставка произведений ленинградских художников 1960 года. Каталог. Л., Художник РСФСР, 1961. С.33.
- Республиканская художественная выставка Советская Россия. Каталог. М., Советский художник, 1960. С.65.
- Выставка произведений ленинградских художников 1961 года. Каталог. Л., Художник РСФСР, 1964. С.32.
- Осенняя выставка произведений ленинградских художников 1962 года. Каталог. Л., Художник РСФСР, 1962. С.22.
- Ленинград. Зональная выставка 1964 года. Каталог. Л, Художник РСФСР, 1965. C.42.
- Каталог весенней выставки произведений ленинградских художников 1965 года. Л., Художник РСФСР, 1970. С.25.
- Третья республиканская художественная выставка Советская Россия. Каталог. М., Министерство культуры РСФСР, 1967. С.44.
- Наш современник. Каталог выставки произведений ленинградских художников 1971 года. Л., Художник РСФСР, 1972. С.18.
- Наш современник. Каталог третьей выставки произведений ленинградских художников 1973 года. Л., Художник РСФСР, 1973. С.11.
- По родной стране. Выставка произведений художников Ленинграда. 50-Летию образования СССР посвящается. Каталог. Л., Художник РСФСР, 1974. С.21.
- Russian Federation Artists's Art works grant to Museums and Culture Institutions (1963–1971). Official Catalogue. Moscow, Union of Artists of Russian Federation, 1972. P.82.
- The Still-life. Leningrad Artists's Art Show of 1973. Catalogue. Leningrad, Khudozhnik RSFSR, 1973. P.12.
- Irina Romanycheva. Academic Dacha. Leningrad, Khudozhnik RSFSR, 1975. P.122–126.
- Наш современник. Зональная выставка произведений ленинградских художников 1975 года. Каталог. Л., Художник РСФСР, 1980. C.22.
- Изобразительное искусство Ленинграда. Каталог выставки. Л., Художник РСФСР, 1976. C.27.
- Выставка произведений ленинградских художников, посвящённая 60-летию Великого Октября. Л., Художник РСФСР, 1982. С.20.
- Directory of Members of the Union of Artists of USSR. Vol.2 Moscow, Soviet artist, 1979. P.216.
- Ленинградские художники. Живопись 1950–1980 годов. Каталог. СПб., 1994. С.6.
- Этюд в творчестве ленинградских художников. Выставка произведений. Каталог. СПб., 1994. С.6.
- Лирика в произведениях художников военного поколения. Выставка произведений. Каталог. СПб., 1995. С.6.
- Живопись 1940–1990 годов. Ленинградская школа. Выставка произведений. СПб., 1996. С.5.
- Натюрморт в живописи 1940–1990 годов. Ленинградская школа. Каталог выставки. СПб., 1997. С.6.
- Pskov art gallery. Soviet Art of 1950-1980s. Moscow, COPEK, 1992. P.3-5.
- Matthew C. Bown. Dictionary of 20th Century Russian and Soviet Painters 1900-1980s. London, Izomar, 1998. ISBN 0-9532061-0-6, ISBN 978-0-9532061-0-0.
- Sergei V. Ivanov. Unknown Socialist Realism. The Leningrad School. Saint Petersburg, NP-Print Edition, 2007. P.12, 15, 24, 28, 368, 414-416, 420, 422-423. ISBN 5-901724-21-6, ISBN 978-5-901724-21-7.
- Иванов С. О творчестве и судьбе Николая Позднеева // Петербургские искусствоведческие тетради. Вып. 30. СПб, 2014. С.25-32.
- Логвинова Е. Круглый стол по ленинградскому искусству в галерее АРКА // Петербургские искусствоведческие тетради. Вып. 31. СПб, 2014. С.17-26.
