= Anniversary Art Exhibition (Leningrad, 1957) =

Soviet art exhibition

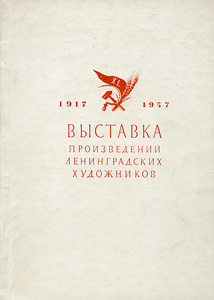
- Anniversary Art Exhibition catalog cover
- Native name: Выставка произведений ленинградских художников 1957 года
- Date: 3 October 1957
- Venue: State Russian Museum
- Location: Leningrad, Soviet Union
- Also known as: Anniversary Art Exhibition of the Leningrad Artists, 1957
- Type: Art exhibit
- Participants: See list

The Anniversary Art Exhibition (Leningrad, 1957) (in full the Anniversary Art Exhibition of the Leningrad Artists, 1957 – Russian: Выставка произведений ленинградских художников 1957 года), dedicated to the 40th Anniversary of the October Revolution (Russian: 1917–1957. Выставка произведений ленинградских художников 1957 года), was one of the most significant events of Soviet art history in the 1950s and in the whole of early Khrushchev Thaw. The exhibition took place in the State Russian Museum.

== History and Organization ==
The Anniversary Art Exhibition was opened on 3 October 1957. Its organization and preparation was carried out by a specially formed exhibition committee of 39 authoritative art experts. An exhibition catalog was published. The exhibition displayed 1,750 works by painters, sculptors, graphics, masters of arts and crafts, and theater and cinema artists. It was attended by 600 Leningrad artists.

== Contributing Artists ==
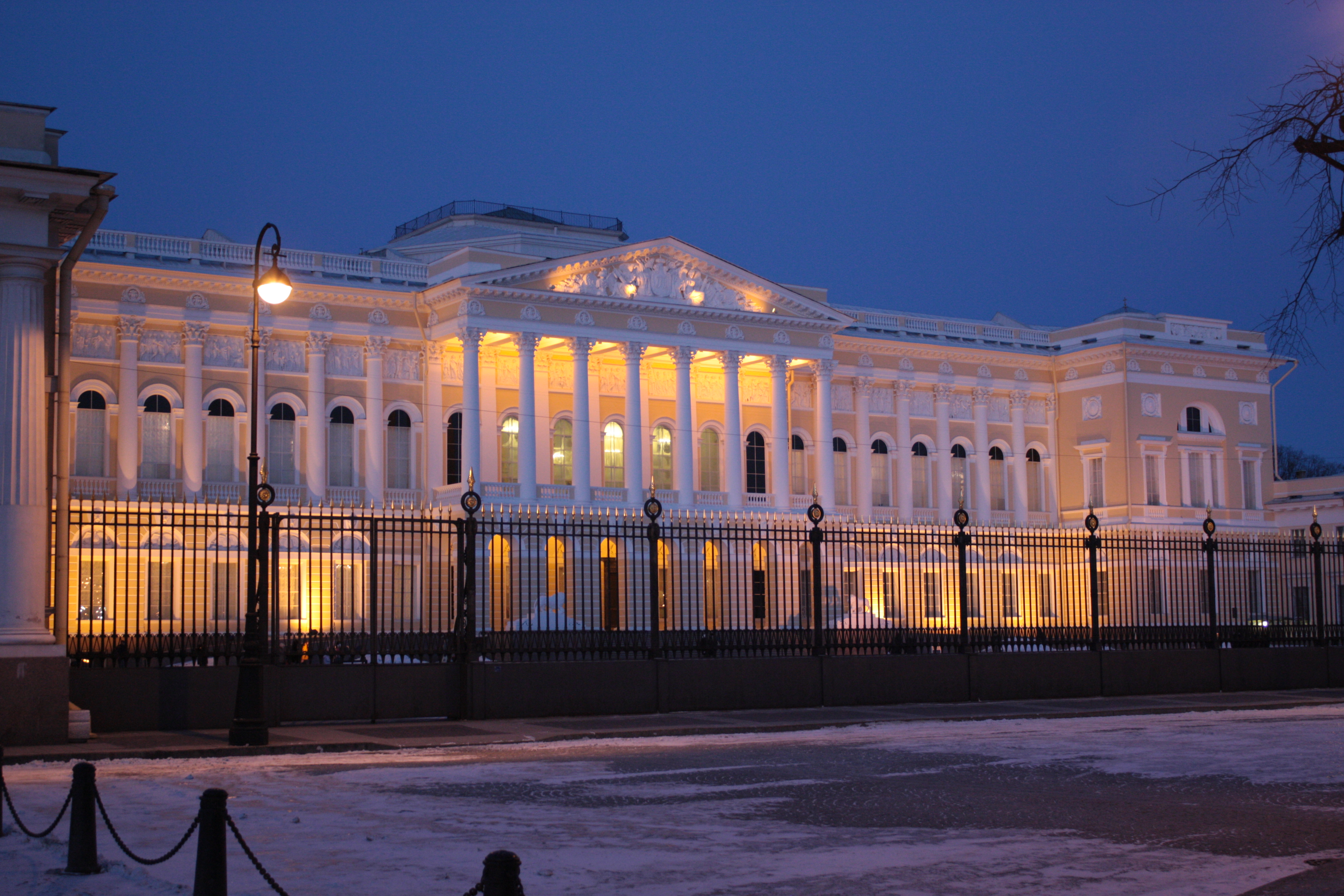
State Russian Museum

In the Department of Painting, the exhibition's largest section, the works of 269 artists were displayed. The artists were Mikhail Anikushin, Evgenia Antipova, Vsevolod Bazhenov, Irina Baldina, Nikolai Baskakov, Leonid Baykov, Piotr Belousov, Olga Bogaevskaya, Lev Bogomolets, Nikolai Brandt, Piotr Buchkin, Zlata Bizova, Vladimir Chekalov, Sergei Frolov, Nikolai Galakhov, Abram Grushko, Alexei Eriomin, Mikhail Kaneev, Engels Kozlov, Tatiana Kopnina, Maya Kopitseva, Boris Korneev, Alexander Koroviakov, Nikolai Kostrov, Anna Kostrova, Gevork Kotiantz, Yaroslav Krestovsky, Boris Lavrenko, Ivan Lavsky, Anatoli Levitin, Oleg Lomakin, Dmitry Maevsky, Gavriil Malish, Alexei Mozhaev, Evsey Moiseenko, Nikolai Mukho, Mikhail Natarevich, Samuil Nevelshtein, Dmitry Oboznenko, Lev Orekhov, Sergei Osipov, Vladimir Ovchinnikov, Filaret Pakun, Genrikh Pavlovsky, Varlen Pen, Nikolai Pozdneev, Stepan Privedentsev, Alexander Pushnin, Lev Russov, Galina Rumiantseva, Ivan Savenko, Gleb Savinov, Alexander Samokhvalov, Arseny Semionov, Alexander Semionov, Boris Shamanov, Alexander Shmidt, Nadezhda Shteinmiller, Galina Smirnova, Ivan Sorokin, Victor Teterin, Mikhail Tkachev, Leonid Tkachenko, Yuri Tulin, Ivan Varichev, Nina Veselova, Rostislav Vovkushevsky, Anatoli Vasiliev, Lazar Yazgur, Vecheslav Zagonek, Ruben Zakharian, Sergei Zakharov, Maria Zubreeva, and other prominent painters of the Leningrad School.

In the Department of Sculpture the works of 113 sculptors were exhibited, while in the Department of Graphics the creations of 117 artists were displayed.

== Contributed Artworks ==
Many of the artworks were specifically created in 1957 for the exhibition, and some earlier works were also displayed. All of the pieces were exhibited in the first time. Some of them were subsequently shown in the collections of other Soviet art museums, as well as in domestic and foreign galleries and collections.

Historical genre: this included Lenin in Gorki by Nikolai Baskakov, Attempt on Lenin by Piotr Belousov, Donbass, 1942 by Anatoli Levitin, First Cavalry Army by Evsey Moiseenko, 1918 by Mikhail Natarevich, Mikhailo Lomonosov in Moscow. 1731 by Anatoli Vasiliev, Proclamation of Soviet Rule by Alexander Samokhvalov, An Attempt on Lenin's life by Piotr Belousov, Lena, 1912 by Yuri Tulin, and A Troubled Youth by Leonid Fokin.

Portraits: these included Egyptian by Mikhail Anikushin, Lithuanian Fisherman by Engels Kozlov, Portrait of the Best Milkmaid, E. Rusova by Nina Veselova, Portrait of Mother by Gevork Kotiantz, Olya by Samuil Nevelshtein, Portrait of the Conductor E. A. Mravinsky by Lev Russov, Portrait of S. V. Obraztsov by Solomon Epshtein, A Boy, Sketch by Mikhail Tkachev, University Embankment by Gleb Savinov, A. Chekhov by Lia Ostrova, and Portrait of Artist V. F. Zogonek by Boris Korneev.

Genre painting: this included On the Neva River by Leonid Baykov, A Hot Day by Olga Bogaevskaya, A Waiting by Maya Kopitseva, A. M. Gorky and F. I. Shaliapin by Piotr Buchkin, Waiting by Maya Kopitseva, At the Rest, In Bulgaria Vladimir Chekalov, Before the May Day Victor Teterin, On the Bridge by Mikhail Natarevich, A Warm Day by Anatoli Levitin, Awakening by Andrei Mylnikov, At the Toy Shop Lev Orekhov, and To the Village by Boris Lavrenko.

Landscape and cityscape: this included Industrial Lights by Vsevolod Bazhenov, The coast of the Barents Sea by Lev Bogomolets, Ancient City of Novgorod by Rostislav Vovkushevsky, On the Volga River by Nikolai Galakhov, After the Rain by Sergei Osipov, A Waterfall with a View to See by Arseny Semionov, Boats, and At Onega by Nikolai Pozdneev, A Night by Vladimir Ovchinnikov, City Landscape by Ruben Zakharian, A New School by Maevsky Dmitry, Crops are Mowed by Gavriil Malish, A Winter Night, Krjukov Channel by Yaroslav Krestovsky, and Winter in Leningrad by Vera Ljubimova.

Still life paintings: these included Still Life by Evgenia Antipova, Bellflowers and Lilac by Irina Baldina, Peaches and Pears by Victor Teterin, Irises, Still Life by Sergei Zakharov, Mushrooms by Maria Davidson, Primula by Gleb Verner, and a series of still lifes by Gevork Kotiantz.

== Coverage ==
The exhibition was widely covered in the press and in literature on Soviet fine art.

== See also ==
- Fine Art of Leningrad
- Leningrad School of Painting
- 1956 in fine arts of the Soviet Union
- Saint Petersburg Union of Artists
- Socialist realism

== Sources ==
- 1917 — 1957. Выставка произведений ленинградских художников. Каталог. Л., Ленинградский художник, 1958.
- Никифоровская И. Итоги большой творческой работы // Вечерний Ленинград. 1957, 10 октября.
- Бродский В. Жизнеутверждающее искусство. // Ленинградская правда, 1957, 11 октября.
- К новым большим свершениям // Ленинградская правда. 1958, 12 января.
- Выставки советского изобразительного искусства. Справочник. Том 5. 1954—1958 годы. М., Советский художник, 1981. — с.385-387.
- Справочник членов Ленинградской организации Союза художников РСФСР. Л., Художник РСФСР, 1980.
- Художники народов СССР. Биобиблиографический словарь. Т.1-4. М., Искусство, 1970-1995
- Справочник членов Союза художников СССР. Том 1,2. — М: Советский художник, 1979.
- Sergei V. Ivanov. Unknown Socialist Realism. The Leningrad School. Saint Petersburg: NP-Print Edition, 2007. P.391. ISBN 5-901724-21-6, ISBN 978-5-901724-21-7
- Юбилейный Справочник выпускников Санкт-Петербургского академического института живописи, скульптуры и архитектуры имени И. Е. Репина Российской Академии художеств. 1915—2005. Санкт Петербург, «Первоцвет», 2007.
