= Still life of 1950–1990s: the Leningrad School =

1997 Soviet art exhibition in Saint Petersburg

Cornflowers
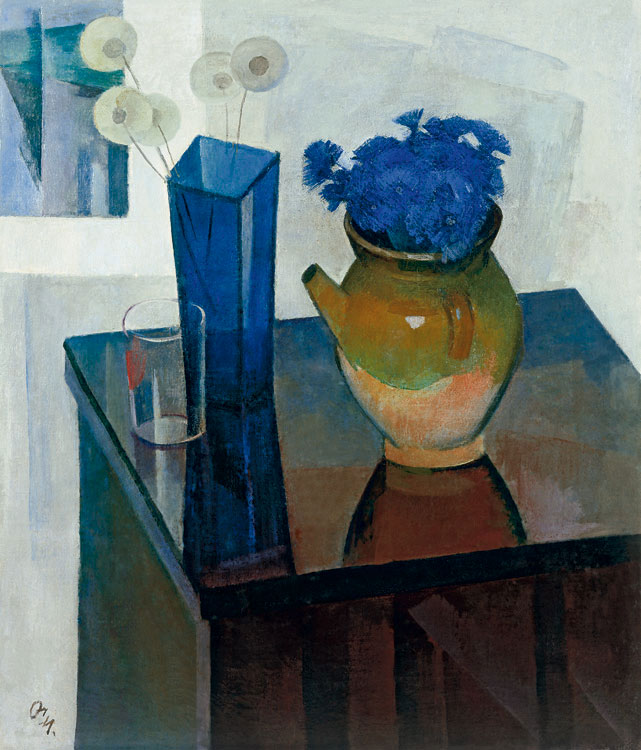
- Artist: Sergei Osipov
- Year: 1976
- Location: private collection; Russia

"Still life of 1950–1990s. The Leningrad School" (Russian: Натюрморт в живописи 1950-1990-х годов. Ленинградская школа) was a retrospective exhibition in 1997 held in Saint Petersburg in the Memorial Museum of Nikolai A. Nekrasov. The exhibition included 56 works from private collections of 25 masters of the Leningrad School.

== History and Organization ==
Exhibition was opened on April 26, and worked up to June 1, 1997. Catalog was published.

== Contributing Artists ==
There were exhibited art works of 25 painters of the Leningrad School: Taisia Afonina, Piotr Alberti, Yuri Belov, Veniamin Borisov, Maya Kopitseva, Alexander Koroviakov, Piotr Litvinsky, Vladimir Malevsky, Piotr Nazarov, Anatoli Nenartovich, Samuil Nevelshtein, Sergei Osipov, Nikolai Pozdneev, Evgeny Pozdniakov, Kapitolina Rumiantseva, Lev Russov, Nadezhda Shteinmiller, Elena Skuin, Piotr Vasiliev, Nina Veselova, Rostislav Vovkushevsky.

== Contributed Artworks ==
For the Exhibition were selected art works created in 1950–1980s. Some of them were exhibited before, some paintings were shown in the first time. In general, the exhibition presented as works of famous masters of this genre, and the direction of development of Still life painting in the works by Leningrad artists of the middle - second half of the twentieth century.

Still life of second half of 1950s was represented by the works of "Peonies" (1958) by Vladimir Malevsky, "Peonies" (1959) by Evgeny Pozdniakov, "Still life with a bust of Seneca" (1958) by Lev Russov, "Flowers and Cherry" (1956) by Elena Skuin, "Still life with a book" (1956) by Piotr Vasiliev, "Glass on the Blue" (1958) by Nina Veselova, and some others.

Still life of 1960s was represented by the works of "Still life with Pussy-Willows" (1964) by Taisia Afonina, "Still life with Brushes" (1968) by Piotr Litvinsky, "Smoked Vobla" (1969) by Nikolai Pozdneev, "Still life with White Cup" (1969) by Kapitolina Rumiantseva, and some others.

Still life of 1970s was represented by the works of "Joinery Workshop" (1976) by Piotr Alberti, "Still life on the Red Material" (1979) by Anatoli Nenartovich, "Autumn branch" (1974) by Sergei Osipov, "Autumn Still life" (1972) by Alexander Koroviakov, and some others.

Still life of 1980s and beginning of 1990s was represented by the works of "Still Life with Watermelon" (1992) by Piotr Alberti, "Still life with yellow cloth" (1981) by Rostislav Vovkushevsky, "Still life with Roses" (1991) by Veniamin Borisov, and some others.

== Acknowledgment ==
Exhibition was widely covered in press and in literature specialized at Soviet fine art. In reviews noted the high level of the works and a rare opportunity to see together paintings of graduates of almost all famous workshops of the Academy of Arts.

== See also ==
- Fine Art of Leningrad
- Leningrad School of Painting
- Saint Petersburg Union of Artists
- Socialist realism

== Sources ==
- Натюрморт в живописи 1950—1990 годов. Ленинградская школа. Каталог. СПб., 1997.
- Серегин С. О сущности стола // Вечерний Петербург. 1997, 21 мая.
- Саблин В. Фрукты, голуби, кофемолка… Натюрморт // Вести. 1997, 27 мая.
- Иванова М. Неизвестные шедевры // Невское время. 1997, 26 апреля.
- Справочник членов Ленинградской организации Союза художников РСФСР. Л., Художник РСФСР, 1987.
- Художники народов СССР. Биобиблиографический словарь. Т.1-4. М., Искусство, 1970–1995.
- Time for Change. The Art of 1960-1985 in the Soviet Union. Saint Petersburg, State Russian Museum, 2006.
- Sergei V. Ivanov. Unknown Socialist Realism. The Leningrad School. Saint Petersburg: NP-Print Edition, 2007. P.405, 422–423. ISBN 5-901724-21-6, ISBN 978-5-901724-21-7
- Юбилейный справочник выпускников Санкт-Петербургского академического института живописи, скульптуры и архитектуры имени И. Е. Репина Российской Академии художеств. 1915—2005. СПб., Первоцвет, 2007.
