= Boris Korneev =

Boris Korneev may refer to:

- Boris Korneev (painter) (1922–1973), Soviet Russian painter and art teacher
