= Portrait of Catherine Balebina =

1956 painting by Lev Russov

- Artist: Lev A. Russov
- Year: 1956
- Medium: Oil on canvas
- Dimensions: 60 cm × 50 cm (24 in × 20 in)
- Location: private collection; Moscow

Portrait of Catherine Balebina is a 1956 painting by Russian portrait artist Lev Russov (1926–1987), which depicts his wife Catherine Balebina (Russian: Екатери′на Васи′льевна Бале′бина; 1933–2002).

== History ==
The portrait was painted in Leningrad (now Saint Petersburg) in 1956 and is one of the most famous portraits by the artist. Catherine Balebina was born December 29, 1933, the daughter of Vasily Balebin, a famed military pilot and torpedo-bomber, Hero of the Soviet Union and Great Patriotic War. Russov met Catherine Balebina in 1955 and they were married on 31 January 1959. His son Andrew Russov was born April 27, 1960, and was his primary muse. Charming and lively, he posed for his father for many paintings and portraits.

In this portrait of his wife, Russov puts on a pedestal a gamine image of feminine beauty and charm. It seems Rusov meant only to canonize and sing of this perfection, and he does it according to the laws of the genre. The painting's neutral background makes Catherine the focal point of the piece. Catherine's closed, dark blue dress focuses attention on her face, shaded by her chestnut hair, and her expressive eyes. Her gaze directed to the side, she hides a smile at the corner of her sensuous lips. In contrast to the stillness of her pose, her eyes speak of a passionate and independent nature, also seem in her expression.

No details of the portrait belong to a specific time or place. Yet we do not hesitate to recognize the young woman as a contemporary of the middle - second half of the 1950s.

Until the early 1990s, Portrait of Catherine Balebina was kept in the artist's family. Subsequently, it was acquired as part of a private collection. In 2007 Portrait of Catherine Balebina has been described and reproduced in the book Unknown Socialist Realism: The Leningrad School, among 350 selected works by artists of the Leningrad School.

== See also ==
- Portrait of Yevgeny Mravinsky
- Artist Lev A. Russov (1926—1987)
- Leningrad School of Painting

== Sources ==
- Directory of Members of the Union of Artists of USSR. Volume 2.Moscow, Soviet artist, 1979. P.290.
- Directory of members of the Leningrad branch of Union of Artists of Russian Federation. Leningrad, Khudozhnik RSFSR, 1980. P.103.
- Иванов С. О ранних портретах Льва Русова // Петербургские искусствоведческие тетради. Выпуск 23. СПб., 2012. С.7-15.
