= Portrait of Yevgeny Mravinsky =

1957 painting by Lev Russov

- Artist: Lev A. Russov
- Year: 1957
- Medium: Oil on canvas
- Dimensions: 95 cm × 73 cm (38 in × 29 in)
- Location: private collection; Moscow

Portrait of Yevgeny Mravinsky is a painting by Russian portrait artist Lev Russov (1926–1987), whose work depicts the famous Russian and Soviet musician Yevgeny Aleksandrovich Mravinsky (1903—1988), principal conductor of the Leningrad Philharmonic Orchestra from 1938–1988.

== History ==
The portrait was painted in Leningrad in 1957. Evgeny Mravinsky is depicted at home, seated in an armchair, immersed in thought. The musical instruments associated with his profession are intentionally relegated to the background. The primary focus of the artwork is to portray Mravinsky as a contemporary intellectual with a strong sense of independence, willpower, and self-assuredness. This helped his profession and the long-term friendship linking the two artists. In 1957, the portrait was exhibited at the Leningrad artists show in the Russian State Museum for the first time.

In 2007, the Portrait of Yevgeny Mravinsky had been commented on and reproduced in the book Unknown Socialist Realism. The Leningrad School among 350 selected works by artists of the Leningrad School.

== See also ==
- Portrait of Catherine Balebina

== Bibliography ==
- 1917 - 1957. Exhibition of works by Leningrad artists. Catalogue. - Leningrad: Khudozhnik RSFSR, 1958. - P. 28.
- Directory of Members of the Union of Artists of USSR. Volume 2.- Moscow: Soviet artist, 1979. - P. 290.
- Directory of members of the Leningrad branch of Union of Artists of Russian Federation. - Leningrad: Khudozhnik RSFSR, 1980. - p. 103.
- Gregor Tassie. Yevgeny Mravinsky: The Noble Conductor. The Scarecrow Press, 2005. ISBN 978-0-8108-5427-7
- Иванов С. О ранних портретах Льва Русова // Петербургские искусствоведческие тетради. Выпуск 23. СПб., 2012. С.7-15.
