= Autumn exhibition (Leningrad, 1956) =

Soviet art exhibition

Autumn Fine Art Exhibition. Leningrad, 1956. Catalog cover
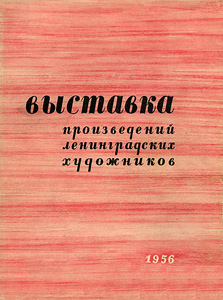
- Year: 1956
- Location: Leningrad Union of Artists Exhibition Halls; Leningrad

Autumn Fine Art Exhibition of Leningrad's artists of 1956 (Russian: Осенняя выставка произведений ленинградских художников 1956 года) became the largest Soviet Art Exhibition of 1956 and for the time of early Khrushchev Thaw. The exhibition took place in Leningrad Union of Soviet Artists Exhibition Halls on Bolshaya Morskaya st. 38.

== History and Organization ==
The Autumn Fine Art Exhibition of 1956 was opened on December 5. Organization and preparation of the Autumn Exhibition was handled by a specially formed Exhibition Committee which consisted of the most authoritative art-experts. It published a catalog of the exhibition. In total, the Exhibition displayed almost 2,000 works of art of painters, sculptors, graphics, masters of arts and crafts, artists of theater and cinema. The Autumn Exhibition of 1956 was attended by 473 artists of the Leningrad.

== Contributing Artists ==
In the largest Department of Painting were exhibited art works of 198 authors. There were Piotr Alberti, Taisia Afonina, Irina Baldina, Nikolai Baskakov, Leonid Baykov, Vsevolod Bazhenov, Yuri Belov, Piotr Belousov, Mikhail Bobyshov, Olga Bogaevskaya, Lev Bogomolets, Nikolai Brandt, Dmitry Buchkin, Piotr Buchkin, Alexei Eriomin, Sergei Frolov, Nikolai Galakhov, Ivan Godlevsky, Vladimir Gorb, Abram Grushko, Alexei Eriomin, Mikhail Kaneev, Tatiana Kopnina, Maya Kopitseva, Boris Korneev, Alexander Koroviakov, Elena Kostenko, Nikolai Kostrov, Anna Kostrova, Gevork Kotiantz, Marina Kozlovskaya, Yaroslav Krestovsky, Ivan Lavsky, Anatoli Levitin, Oleg Lomakin, Dmitry Maevsky, Gavriil Malish, Alexei Mozhaev, Nikolai Mukho, Samuil Nevelshtein, Yaroslav Nikolaev, Sergei Osipov, Vladimir Ovchinnikov, Filaret Pakun, Genrikh Pavlovsky, Varlen Pen, Lev Russov, Ivan Savenko, Gleb Savinov, Vladimir Seleznev, Alexander Semionov, Arseny Semionov, Yuri Shablikin, Boris Shamanov, Alexander Shmidt, Nadezhda Shteinmiller, Elena Skuin, Victor Teterin, Nikolai Timkov, Mikhail Tkachev, Mikhail Trufanov, Yuri Tulin, Piotr Vasiliev, Igor Veselkin, Rostislav Vovkushevsky, Vecheslav Zagonek, Ruben Zakharian, Sergei Zakharov, Alexander Zaytsev, Elena Zhukova, and others most prominent painters of the Leningrad School.

In the Department of Sculptures were exhibited art works of 58 sculptors. Department of graphics presented a creation of 181 artists.

== Contributed Artworks ==
For the Exhibition were selected art works created in 1956, also some earlier works. All they were exhibited in the first time. Some of them were subsequently found in the collections of Soviet Art museums, as well as domestic and foreign galleries and collectors.

Portrait was presented of "Masha" by Nikolai Baskakov, "Portrait of Piotr Kulabko, veteran of Communist Party" by Yuri Belov, "Portrait of Wife", "A Portrait" by Piotr Buchkin, "Female portrait", "Girl in blue dress" by Ivan Godlevsky, "Portrait of Yevgeny Tarle" by Vladimir Gorb, "Ivan Ryabov" by Mikhail Kaneev, "Portrait of Chinese student", "Portrait of a graduate student" by Tatiana Kopnina, "Portrait of Andrei" by Boris Korneev, "Portrait of son", "Portrait of Galina Korotkevich" by Elena Kostenko, "Tania. Portrait of daughter" by Gevork Kotiantz, "Girl student of medical University" by Marina Kozlovskaya, "Mother", "Andrey" by Anatoli Levitin, "Portrait of artist Vladimir Ovchinnikov" by Oleg Lomakin, "Portrait of Wife" by Andrei Mylnikov, "Furnaceman" by Mikhail Trufanov, and some others.

Genre painting was presented of "In Winter" by Nikolai Baskakov, "Salute. Moscow" by Mikhail Bobyshov, "Girls", "In Art Studio" by Olga Bogaevskaya, "The first drops of rain" by Lev Bogomolets, "Hunters", "After Hunting" by Alexei Eriomin, "Port on the Volga River. Towards evening" by Nikolai Galakhov, "Visit opf Friendship" by Nikolai Mukho, "Artists" by Filaret Pakun, series "Till Eulenshpigel" by Lev Russov, "On the Ferry" by Gleb Savinov, "Tchaikovsky street in Leningrad" and "Forging Shop" by Alexander Semionov, "In Northern Korea" by Varlen Pen, "Spring has come", "On the Onega riverside" by Vecheslav Zagonek, and some others.

Landscape and Cityscape were presented of "Windy Day", "Boats" by Taisia Afonina, "A Young Rowan tree", "Evening" by Irina Baldina, "On the North", "Close to boats", "Lake blooms" by Leonid Baykov, "Before the Thunderstorm", "The sun disappeared behind the mountain" by Vsevolod Bazhenov, "In Winter" by Nikolai Baskakov, "Potato field" by Mikhail Bobyshov, "The first drops" by Lev Bogomolets, "Boats", "Autumn" by Nikolai Brandt, "Crimean Etude", "Spring Etude" by Dmitry Buchkin, "Yandish Lake", "On the North" by Alexei Eriomin, "Water meadows on the Volga River", "July" by Nikolai Galakhov, "A Road to Lake Ritsa", "Ararat plain", "Poppies" by Ivan Godlevsky, "On the edge of the forest", "Sheaves in the field" by Abram Grushko, "Chukhloma town", "Old Kiev" by Mikhail Kaneev, "October", "Aspen stumps", "April" by Maya Kopitseva, "Night flame", "Birches" by Boris Korneev, "First snow", "Palace Square" by Alexander Koroviakov, "Autumn", "Cloudy day" by Marina Kozlovskaya, "Evening on the Onega Lake", "Kondopoga town" by Yaroslav Krestovsky, "Barns" by Dmitry Maevsky, "On the Volkhov River", "Little Brook" by Sergei Osipov, "On the banks of the Dnieper River" by Vladimir Ovchinnikov, "Gurzuf. Mountains in the evening" by Arseny Semionov, "Autumn Landscape" by Piotr Vasiliev, "Courtyard", "Ryazan meadows", "Winter Etude", "Moonlight Night", "After the Rain" by Igor Veselkin, "Landscape" by Rostislav Vovkushevsky, "Thaw", "Become cold" by Vecheslav Zagonek, "Cityscape", "In the suburb of Leningrad" by Ruben Zakharian, "Spring", "On the North" by Alexander Zaytsev, "Gurzuf. A House at the sea", "Corner of Gurzuf", "Boats on the seashore" by Elena Zhukova, and some others.

Still life paintings were presented of "Flowers" by Piotr Alberti, "Bluebells" by Irina Baldina, "Still Life with Decanter", "Flowers" by Olga Bogaevskaya, "Golden-scarlet poppies" by Lev Bogomolets, "Lemons and Oranges" by Ivan Godlevsky, "White Lilac" by Maya Kopitseva, "Still Life" by Gevork Kotiantz, "Still Life" by Yaroslav Nikolaev, "Peonies and Cherry" by Elena Skuin, "Still Life" by Victor Teterin, "Flowers" by Piotr Vasiliev, "A Breakfast" by Rostislav Vovkushevsky, "Still life" by Vecheslav Zagonek, and some others.

== Acknowledgment ==
Autumn Fine Art Exhibition of the Leningrad artists of 1956 was widely covered in press and in literature on Soviet fine art.

== See also ==
- Fine Art of Leningrad
- Leningrad School of Painting
- 1956 in fine arts of the Soviet Union
- Saint Petersburg Union of Artists
- Socialist realism

== Sources ==
- Днепрова Е. Открылась выставка работ ленинградских художников. // Вечерний Ленинград, 1956, 6 декабря.
- Мочалов Л. Выставка без жюри. Новые работы ленинградских живописцев. // Вечерний Ленинград, 1956, 11 декабря.
- Мацулевич Ж. Творчество скульпторов. // Вечерний Ленинград, 1956, 20 декабря
- Осенняя выставка произведений ленинградских художников. 1956 год. Каталог. Л., Ленинградский художник, 1958
- Художники народов СССР. Биобиблиографический словарь. Т.1-4. М., Искусство, 1970–1995
- Справочник членов Союза художников СССР. Т.1,2. М., Советский художник, 1979
- Справочник членов Ленинградской организации Союза художников РСФСР. Л., Художник РСФСР, 1980
- Выставки советского изобразительного искусства. Справочник. Том 5. 1954—1958 годы. М., Советский художник, 1981., c. 258–260
- Юбилейный Справочник выпускников Санкт-Петербургского академического института живописи, скульптуры и архитектуры имени И. Е. Репина Российской Академии художеств. 1915—2005. СПб., Первоцвет, 2007
- Sergei V. Ivanov. Unknown Socialist Realism. The Leningrad School.- Saint Petersburg: NP-Print Edition, 2007. P.390. ISBN 5-901724-21-6, ISBN 978-5-901724-21-7
