= Alexander Semionov =

Soviet Russian painter

Alexander Mikhailovich Semionov
- Born: 18 February 1922; Torzhok, Soviet Russia
- Died: 23 June 1984 (aged 62); Leningrad, USSR
- Education: Tavricheskaya Art School
- Known for: Painting
- Movement: Realism

Alexander Mikhailovich Semionov (Russian: Александр Михайлович Семёнов; 18 February 1922 – 23 June 1984) was a Soviet Russian painter, a member of the Leningrad Union of Artists and representative of the Leningrad School of Painting, most famous for his cityscape paintings.

== Biography ==
Alexander Semionov was born in Torzhok, Tver Oblast, Russia. In the mid-1930s his family moved to Leningrad. Having abilities to draw from the early age, Semionov entered Tavricheskaya Art School, where he studied under Alexander Gromov, Semion Bootler, Victor Oreshnikov, Vladimir Levitsky and Mariam Aslamazian.

In 1940 Semionov graduated from Tavricheskaya Art School. In 1940–1941 he worked as copyist at the LenIzo Leningrad Art Centre. In the Russian Museum he painted copies from works of Ivan Shishkin, Ilya Repin an Isaak Levitan.

In 1941, Semionov went to the front as a volunteer, passing through all the trials of wartime from beginning to end. After that he returned to work in LenIzo as a painter, gradually restoring and improving his professional skills. He painted from life in such picturesque suburbs of Leningrad as Rozhdestvenno, Wyra, Daymische (for example Summer Day, of 1951), where from the late 1940s to the early 1950s settled Leningrad artists Piotr Buchkin, Nikolai Timkov, Yuri Podlaski, George Tatarnikov, and other artists.

Since 1954, Semionov started to show his work on the exhibitions of Leningrad artists. These were sketches brought back from trips to the Ural and Altai: Altai Province. Cherga Area, Altai Mountains. Charga Area, Altai Province. Shebalino District, and Altai. At the Seshinsky Pass (all 1954), Blacksmith workshop (1956), At the Chusovoy Plant, Rolling workshop (both 1957), and others. In these sketches traced the taste and great abilities of the artist to plein air painting, his ability for composition, for quickly grasp and transferring the lighting on canvas.

In 1957, Semionov was admitted to the Leningrad branch of Union of Artists of Russian Federation. In the same year as one of the leading painters of Leningrad, Semionov participated in the All-Union Art Exhibition in Moscow dedicated to the 40th anniversary of the October Revolution.

Early successes encouraged Semionov to further creative exploration, establishing the main theme of creativity specific to his temperament and painterly talent. Since the late 1950s it became the urban landscape, a favorite theme – streets, bridges, and embankments of Leningrad. Semionov embodied it in countless sketches and paintings, and made a significant contribution to the contemporary iconography of Leningrad. Among his works shown at the exhibitions were A Rainy Day (1958), After the Rain (1960), Rainy day in Summer Garden (1961), Leningrad in the morning (1969), The Moyka River, Isaacievskaya Square, Leningrad. Winter motive (all 1961), Winter Park" (1961), On the Neva River (1964), The Leningrad and A Field of Mars (both 1975), Kirovskiy Prospect (1965), The Leningrad (1967), Furmanov Street in Leningrad (1976), and others.

From 1950 to 1970, in search of material for his paintings, Semionov, in addition to trips to the Altai and the Urals, repeatedly worked in the House the work of artists in Staraya Ladoga (Winter Forest, 1963, Bright Day in Old Ladoga, 1964, Winter in ancient town Old Ladoga, 1969, A Midday, 1971, Old Ladoga. Towards Spring, 1972, Little courtyard in Old Ladoga, 1974, Monastery in the Old Ladoga, 1975, In Christmas, 1975, and others) and visited ancient Russian towns Torzhok and Rostov the Great. There he painted the ancient corners of the Tver region, keeping the cherished images of childhood and youth of the artist (A Little courtyard in Rostov the Great, 1965, Rostov the Great, 1965, Torzhok in the Morning, 1972, Torzhok. Hotel, 1972, Summer day in Torzhok ancient town, 1973, and others ).

By the mid-1960s Semionov developed a characteristic style of painting, favorite themes and methods of their development. In cityscapes he aspires to transfer the sensation of street, movement, and to keep on a canvas the peeped scenes of a city life. He gives great attention to light and shadow contrasts, and plain air effects to transfer volumes of urban spaces. The artist liked to paint Leningrad in rainy weather, masterly transferring game of color stains on wet asphalt.

Semionov's paintings are distinguished by finesse plain air, bright saturated colors and accurate transfer of tonal relations. Generalized drawing with a brush along with the active use of palette knife made of various texture painting, and allow the artist to achieve unity of artistic conception and its realization on canvas.

In 1965–1980 Semionov was regarded as a leader of Russian cityscape painting. He created a truthful image of a modern Leningrad (At the Kirov Prospekt in Leningrad, 1965, Leningrad Motive, 1967, At the Isaakievskaya Square in Leningrad, 1972, View at the Smolny Cathedral in Leningrad, 1974, Leningrad Theme, 1974, At the Suvorov Prospekt in Leningrad, 1975, Nevsky Prospekt in Evening Lights, 1976, Rainy Day, 1977, Leningrad Bridges, 1977, A Night at the Isaaky Square, 1978, Liteyny Bridge, 1982, and others). Some of his paintings are now perceived as literary evidence of the recent era: Nevsky Prospekt decorated brightly colored flags and banners (Nevsky Prospekt in Holiday, 1970, Nevsky Prospekt, 1977), the familiar streets, retaining its appearance in the paintings of the artist (Malaya Sadovaya street, 1979).

In 1960–1980 Alexander Semionov painted a lot in the picturesque suburbs of Leningrad. His paintings allow speak of him as a subtle master of the lyrical landscape. Among them Spring in the garden, 1967, A Midday in Pushkin town, 1968, Relic of the Past, 1968, A Bush of Lilac, 1969, In the Pushkin Town, 1969, Summer Day, 1973, After the rain, 1976, Clear up, 1976, Windy Day, 1976, Chikino Lake, 1978, Griazno Village, 1978, A Path in the village of Rozhdestveno, 1979, A Summer, 1979, and others.

In the 1970s Semionov's paintings were presented at the exhibitions of Soviet art in Japan, and in the 1990s at the auctions and exhibitions of Russian art in France, Italy, the UK, and the US.

Alexander Mikhailovich Semionov died on 23 June 1984 in Leningrad at the age of sixty-three.

In 1987, in the exhibition halls of the Leningrad Union of Artists held an exhibition of the works of Alexander Semionov, shown later in the cities of Leningrad region. His paintings reside in art museums and private collections in Russia, Japan, the US, England, France, and throughout the world.

== See also ==
- Malaya Sadovaya (painting)
- Fine Art of Leningrad
- Leningrad School of Painting
- List of 20th-century Russian painters
- Saint Petersburg Union of Artists

== Principal exhibitions ==
- 1955 (Leningrad): Spring Exhibition of works by Leningrad artists of 1955
- 1956 (Leningrad): The Fall Exhibition of works by Leningrad artists of 1956
- 1957 (Leningrad): 1917–1957. Leningrad Artist's works of Art Exhibition
- 1957 (Moscow): All-Union Art Exhibition of 1957 dedicated to the 40th Anniversary of October Revolution
- 1958 (Leningrad): The Fall Exhibition of works by Leningrad artists of 1958
- 1960 (Leningrad): Exhibition of works by Leningrad artists of 1960
- 1960 (Leningrad): Exhibition of works by Leningrad artists of 1960
- 1961 (Leningrad): Exhibition of works by Leningrad artists of 1961
- 1962 (Leningrad): The Fall Exhibition of works by Leningrad artists of 1962
- 1964 (Leningrad): The Leningrad Fine Arts Exhibition
- 1965 (Leningrad): The Spring Exhibition of works by Leningrad artists of 1965
- 1968 (Leningrad): The Fall Exhibition of works by Leningrad artists of 1968
- 1969 (Leningrad): The Spring Exhibition of works by Leningrad artists of 1969
- 1975 (Leningrad): Our Contemporary regional exhibition of Leningrad artists of 1975
- 1976 (Moscow): The Fine Arts of Leningrad
- 1977 (Leningrad): Art belongs to the people. Anniversary Exhibition of Leningrad artists dedicated to 60th Anniversary of Great October Revolution of 1917
- 1978 (Leningrad): The Fall Exhibition of works by Leningrad artists of 1978
- 1994 (Saint Petersburg): Paintings of 1950-1980s by the Leningrad School's artists
- 1994 (Saint Petersburg): Etude from the life in creativity of the Leningrad School's artists
- 1995 (Saint Petersburg): Lyrical motifs in postwar Leningrad Painting
- 1996 (Saint Petersburg): Paintings of 1940-1990s. The Leningrad School
- 2013 (Saint Petersburg): Paintings of 1940–1980 by the Artists of the Leningrad School, in ARKA Gallery

== Bibliography ==
- Весенняя выставка произведений ленинградских художников 1955 года. Каталог. Л., ЛССХ, 1956. С.16.
- Осенняя выставка произведений ленинградских художников 1956 года. Каталог. Л., Ленинградский художник, 1958. С.22.
- 1917–1957. Выставка произведений ленинградских художников. Каталог. Л., Ленинградский художник, 1958. С.29.
- Всесоюзная художественная выставка, посвящённая 40-летию Великой Октябрьской социалистической революции. Каталог. М., Советский художник, 1957. С.71.
- Осенняя выставка произведений ленинградских художников 1958 года. Каталог. Л., Художник РСФСР, 1959. С.24.
- Выставка произведений ленинградских художников 1960 года. Каталог. Л., Художник РСФСР, 1963. С.16.
- Выставка произведений ленинградских художников 1960 года. Каталог. Л., Художник РСФСР, 1961. С.37.
- Выставка произведений ленинградских художников 1961 года. Каталог. Л., Художник РСФСР, 1964. С.36.
- Осенняя выставка произведений ленинградских художников 1962 года. Каталог. Л., Художник РСФСР, 1962. С.24.
- Ленинград. Зональная выставка 1964 года. Каталог. Л, Художник РСФСР, 1965. C.48.
- Каталог весенней выставки произведений ленинградских художников 1965 года. Л., Художник РСФСР, 1970. С.27.
- Осенняя выставка произведений ленинградских художников 1968 года. Каталог. Л., Художник РСФСР, 1971. С.14.
- Весенняя выставка произведений ленинградских художников 1969 года. Каталог. Л., Художник РСФСР, 1970. C.16.
- Выставка произведений ленинградских художников, посвящённая 25-летию победы в Великой Отечественной войне. Каталог. Л., Художник РСФСР, 1972. С.10.
- Весенняя выставка произведений ленинградских художников 1971 года. Каталог. Л., Художник РСФСР, 1972. C.14.
- Натюрморт. Выставка произведений ленинградских художников. Каталог. Л., Художник РСФСР, 1973. С.12.
- Наш современник. Зональная выставка произведений ленинградских художников 1975 года. Каталог. Л., Художник РСФСР, 1980. C.24.
- Изобразительное искусство Ленинграда. Каталог выставки. Л., Художник РСФСР, 1976. C.30.
- Exhibition of modern Soviet Painting. 1976. Gekkoso Gallery. Catalogue. Tokyo, 1976. P.91,158.
- Портрет современника. Пятая выставка произведений ленинградских художников 1976 года. Каталог. Л., Художник РСФСР, 1983. С.19.
- Выставка произведений ленинградских художников, посвящённая 60-летию Великого Октября. Л., Художник РСФСР, 1982. С.21.
- Осенняя выставка произведений ленинградских художников. 1978 года. Каталог. Л., Художник РСФСР, 1983. С.15.
- Справочник членов Союза художников СССР. Т.2. М., Советский художник, 1979. С.330.
- Александр Михайлович Семёнов. Выставка произведений. Л., ЛОСХ РСФСР, 1987.
- Painture Russe. Catalogue. Paris, Drouot Richelieu, 1991, 26 April. P.7,26.
- Peinture Russe. Catalogue. Paris, Drouot Richelieu, 1991, 24 Septembre. P.8-9.
- Ecole de Saint-Petersburg. Catalogue. Paris, Drouot Richelieu, 13 Mars, 1992. P.87-91.
- Peintures Russes – Русские художники. Catalogue. Bruxelles, Palais Des Beaux-Arts, 17 Fevrier, 1993. Р.51.
- Ленинградские художники. Живопись 1950–1980 годов. Каталог. СПб., 1994. С.4.
- Этюд в творчестве ленинградских художников. Выставка произведений. Каталог. СПб., 1994. С.6.
- Лирика в произведениях художников военного поколения. Выставка произведений. Каталог. СПб., 1995. С.6.
- Живопись 1940–1990 годов. Ленинградская школа. Выставка произведений. СПб., 1996. С.4.
- Цыганов А. Чтобы собирать такие картины, надо быть немного романтиком // Невское время. 1996, 13 марта.
- Фёдоров С. Весна в городе и натюрморт с вербами // Смена. 1996, 6 марта.
- Matthew C. Bown. Dictionary of 20th Century Russian and Soviet Painters 1900-1980s. London, Izomar 1998. ISBN 0-9532061-0-6, ISBN 978-0-9532061-0-0.
- Sergei V. Ivanov. Unknown Socialist Realism. The Leningrad School. St Petersburg, NP-Print, 2007. P.9, 21, 24, 44, 56, 89, 97, 153, 175, 199, 206, 209, 281, 329, 369, 389–400, 404, 405, 414–422. ISBN 5-901724-21-6, ISBN 978-5-901724-21-7.
- Igor N. Pishny. The Leningrad School of painting. Socialist realism of 1930-1980s. Saint Petersburg, Kolomenskaya versta, 2008. ISBN 978-5-91555-005-5.
- Иванов С. О ленинградских пейзажах Александра Семёнова // Петербургские искусствоведческие тетради. Вып. 23. СПб., 2012. С.43–46.
- Иванов С. В. Семёнов Александр Михайлович //Страницы памяти. Справочно-биографический сборник. 1941–1945. Художники Санкт-Петербургского (Ленинградского) Союза художников — ветераны Великой Отечественной войны. Кн.2. СПб, Петрополис, 2014. С.305-306.
