= Veniamin Borisov =

Russian painter (1935-2014)

Veniamin Ivanovich Borisov
- Born: 16 April 1935; Susanino, Kostroma Oblast, Russian SFSR
- Died: 6 October 2014 (aged 79); Saint Petersburg
- Education: Repin Institute of Arts
- Known for: Painting
- Movement: realism

Veniamin Ivanovich Borisov (Russian: Вениами́н Ива́нович Бори́сов; 16 April 1935 – 6 October 2014) was a Soviet Russian painter, a member of the Saint Petersburg Union of Artists (before 1992 – the Leningrad branch of Union of Artists of Russian Federation, lived and worked in Saint Petersburg, regarded as one of the representatives of the Leningrad school of painting.

== Biography ==
Veniamin Ivanovich Borisov was born on 16 April 1935 in Susanino village, Kostroma Oblast of the Russian Federation. Symbolically, it is in this village a famous Russian artist Alexei Savrasov in 1871 painted from nature his most known painting The Rooks Have Come Back.

In 1944 the family moved to the city of Oryol. There the future artist studied in high school and also at the Art Studio. Then he went to the Art College in the town of Yelets. After graduating Art College, Borisov in 1957 went to Leningrad and joined the Department of Painting of the Repin Institute of Arts, where he studied of Vladimir Gorb, Vitaly Vjaltsev, Valery Pimenov. In 1963 Borisov graduated from Repin Institute of Arts in Joseph Serebriany workshop. His graduate work was genre painting In the native village.

Borisov first participated in an exhibition in 1957. Since the mid-1960s he regularly participates in Art exhibitions, showing his work together with works by the leading masters of fine arts of the Leningrad. He painted landscapes, still lifes, genre scenes, and portraits. In 1968 he was admitted to the Leningrad Union of Artists. In 1960–1980 years he repeatedly worked in the House of creativity Staraya Ladoga.

== Creativity ==
Creative manner Borisov distinguished identity, a deep connection with the images of the Russian countryside. His works of 1960-1980s give an idea about search of own pictorial language and themes, among them Ruins in the Pavlovsk Park (1962), Balalaika players (1967), At the Pond (1968), Sergey Esenin (1971), A Field plowed (1975), A Widow (1976), The Quiet evening (1977), village, My Grandmother (both 1978), The City is built (1980), Cottage in Staraya Ladoga, Sunny Day on the Moyka river, Autumn in Staraya Ladoga (all 1981) Country Girl (1986), House near river, Autumn Still Life (both 1989), and others.

His main topic becomes the images of the artist's childhood and youth, the northern village and the peasant way of life, landscapes of the native land and the central Russia. It is embodied also in the numerous still lifes, occupying a special place in his work. Among them are Rich haul (1988), Still Life with supplies (1989), Still life with White Lilac, Flowers of wild rose (both 1990), Still Life with Lilac (1992), Still Life with flowers (1995), Still Life on a pink table-cloth (1997), Wildflowers (2003), and others.

Since the late 1980s Borisov often refers to the theme of the urban landscape, enriching the genre with original works that reflect the life of Saint Petersburg at the crossroads of epochs. Among them Nevsky Prospect (1989), The Ice cream vender, The Arch of Headquarters (both 1991), Spring on Nevsky Prospekt (1992), Church of the Vladimir Icon of the Mother of God (1997), Bank Bridge (2002), and others. Veniamin Borisov was a member of Peter's Academy of Arts and Sciences. His personal exhibitions were in Saint Petersburg in 1994 and 2005.

Veniamin Ivanovich Borisov died on 6 October 2014 in Saint Petersburg in his eightieth year. His paintings reside in Art Museums and private collections in Russia, Japan, in the U.S., Finland, and other countries.

== See also ==
- Leningrad School of Painting
- House of creativity Staraya Ladoga
- List of 20th-century Russian painters
- List of painters of Saint Petersburg Union of Artists
- List of the Russian Landscape painters
- Saint Petersburg Union of Artists

== Sources ==
- Третья республиканская художественная выставка Советская Россия. Каталог. М., Министерство культуры РСФСР, 1967. С.19.
- Каталог весенней выставки произведений ленинградских художников 1969 года. Л., Художник РСФСР, 1970. C.8.
- Выставка произведений ленинградских художников, посвященная 25-летию победы над фашистской Германией. Каталог. Л., Художник РСФСР, 1972. С.6.
- Весенняя выставка произведений ленинградских художников 1971 года. Каталог. Л., Художник РСФСР, 1972. С.7.
- Наш современник. Зональная выставка произведений ленинградских художников 1975 года. Каталог. Л., Художник РСФСР, 1980. C.12.
- Выставка произведений ленинградских художников, посвящённая 60-летию Великого Октября. Л., Художник РСФСР, 1982. С.12.
- Осенняя выставка произведений ленинградских художников. 1978 года. Каталог. Л., Художник РСФСР, 1983. С.6.
- Справочник членов Союза художников СССР. Т. 1. М., Советский художник, 1979. С.142.
- Зональная выставка произведений ленинградских художников 1980 года. Каталог. Л., Художник РСФСР, 1983. C.10.
- Справочник членов Ленинградской организации Союза художников РСФСР. Л., Художник РСФСР, 1989. С.17.
- Интерьер и натюрморт. Выставка произведений живописи художников Российской Федерации. Каталог. Л., Художник РСФСР, 1991. С.48.
- Борисов Вениамин Иванович. Живопись. Выставка произведений. СПб., 1994.
- Ленинградские художники. Живопись 1950–1980 годов. Каталог. СПб., 1994. С.3.
- Этюд в творчестве ленинградских художников. Выставка произведений. Каталог. СПб., 1994. С.3.
- Живопись 1940–1990 годов. Ленинградская школа. Выставка произведений. СПб., 1996. С.3.
- Связь времен. 1932–1997. Художники — члены Санкт-Петербургского Союза художников России. Каталог выставки. СПб., ЦВЗ Манеж, 1997. С.40,284.
- Натюрморт в живописи 1940–1990 годов. Ленинградская школа. Каталог выставки. СПб., 1997. С.3.
- Matthew C. Bown. Dictionary of 20th Century Russian and Soviet Painters 1900-1980s. - London: Izomar, 1998. ISBN 0-9532061-0-6, ISBN 978-0-9532061-0-0.
- Художники — городу. Выставка к 70-летию Санкт-Петербургского Союза художников. Каталог. СПб., Петрополь, 2003. С.179.
- Sergei V. Ivanov. Unknown Socialist Realism. The Leningrad School. Saint Petersburg, NP-Print Edition, 2007. P.21, 357, 395, 396, 398–400, 404–407, 446. ISBN 5-901724-21-6, ISBN 978-5-901724-21-7.
- Anniversary Directory graduates of Saint Petersburg State Academic Institute of Painting, Sculpture, and Architecture named after Ilya Repin, Russian Academy of Arts. 1915–2005. Saint-Petersburg, Pervotsvet Publishing House, 2007. P.90.
- Artists of the Peter's Academy of Arts and Sciences. Saint Petersburg, 2008. P.28-29.
