= Taisia Afonina =

Russian painter

- Таисия Афонина
- Born: 13 May 1913; Nikolayev, Kherson Governorate, Russian Empire
- Died: 19 April 1994 (aged 80); Saint Petersburg, Russia
- Education: Repin Institute of Arts
- Known for: Painting
- Movement: realism

Taisia Kirillovna Afonina (Russian: Таи́сия Кири́лловна Афо́нина; 13 May 1913 – 19 April 1994) was a Soviet painter and watercolorist. She lived and worked in Leningrad, was a member of the Saint Petersburg Union of Artists (before 1992 - the Leningrad branch of Union of Artists of Russian Federation), and is regarded as one of the representatives of the Leningrad school of painting.

== Biography ==
Afonina was born on 13 May 1913 in the city Nikolaev, Kherson Governorate, of the Russian Empire (present-day Mykolaiv, Ukraine), in the family of master Shipyard "Navel" (after October Revolution Shipyard named Marty).

Still Life with Pussy-Willows (1964)

In 1931 Taisia Afonina graduated from nine-year school in city Taganrog and came to Leningrad to obtain an art education. In 1932-1936 she engaged first in the evening classes for working youth, then in the preparatory classes at the Russian Academy of Arts.

In 1936, after preparatory classes, Afonina was adopted at the first course of Painting Department of the Leningrad Institute of Painting, Sculpture and Architecture, where she studied of Mikhail Bernshtein, Victor Oreshnikov, Pavel Naumov.

In 1941, after the beginning of Great Patriotic War, Taisia Afonina, with her young son and mother, evacuated first to Ostashkov, then Vyshny Volochyok, then Luhansk, Ukraine. In 1943, after the liberation of the German fascists Lugansk, Taisia Afonina was involved in rebuilding the city, teaching drawing and painting in Lugansk Art school. In autumn 1943, with a group of artists she went to the city of Krasnodon to draw local club before awarding medals to parents of deceased members of the underground anti-fascist Komsomol organization Young Guard. They fought against the Nazis in the occupied city Krasnodon (in the Ukrainian SSR), and became known to the whole country.

In 1946, in the May edition of the newspaper of the Academy of Fine Arts "For the Socialist Realism", Taisa Afonina wrote: "I saw the pit where they were dumped, the remnants of their bloody clothes, the prison where they were tortured. I talked to their mothers and girlfriends. I wanted to tell, to write about all this, of all their short heroic life".

In 1946, Afonina graduated from the Repin Institute of Arts in Igor Grabar personal Art Studio of monumental painting. Her graduate work was a historical painting named "Girls of Donbas", dedicated to the memory and heroism members of the Anti-Fascist underground.

After graduation Afonina continued to work in Lugansk and returned to Leningrad in 1952. The Kliment Voroshilov Luhansk Museum acquired as early as 1943 the first three paintings by Taisia Afonina: The Germans came, Stealing in Germany, and Meeting. Her paintings were later purchased by the art museums of Leningrad, Kostroma, Krasnodon, Staraya Ladoga, and the Museum of Modern Art in Paris.

== Creativity ==
Her first participation in an art exhibition was in 1940. Since the beginning of 1950s, Antipova constantly involved in art exhibitions of Leningrad artists. She painted landscapes, still-lifes, portraits, and genre compositions. She worked in oil painting and watercolors and was most famous as a master of landscape and still-life painting. In 1946 Taisia Afonina was admitted to the Leningrad Union of Soviet Artists.

In the first years after graduation Taisia Afonin attracted military subjects and pathos revival. Later she worked more in the genres of portrait and lyrical landscape. In the 1950s she visited Ukraine, Carpathians, Meshchersky locations, where she painted a lot of studies from the life. For her works typical method of tonal painting, the interest to transfer effect of lights and plain air, and subtle coloristic relations. Among her works are such paintings as Foundry Conveyor (1947), Portrait of Kizilshtein-Mikhailova, Grapes and Apples (both 1955), Windy Day (1956), Close to Ryazan (1958), Spring, A Light-Blue Night, After the Rain, At the Old Tuchkov Bridge (all 1959), On the Zhdanovka River in Leningrad (1960), Chinese student (1961), Still-life with Pussy-Willows, Portrait of poet Olga Bergholz, Marinka, Briar (all 1964), Portrait of artist Margarita Ruban (1971), Portrait A. Grebenuk, Portrait of an entomologist S. Keleynikova (both 1975), Portrait of a Korean woman Tamara (1977), and Portrait of writer Nikolai Tikhonov (1980).

Taisia Kirillovna Afonina died on 19 April 1994 in Saint Petersburg at the age of 80. Her paintings reside in art museums and private collections in Russia, Finland, USA, Germany, England, France, and others.

== See also ==
- Still life with Pussy-Willows (painting)
- Fine Art of Leningrad
- Leningrad School of Painting
- List of 20th-century Russian painters
- List of painters of Saint Petersburg Union of Artists
- Saint Petersburg Union of Artists

== Sources ==
- Осенняя выставка произведений ленинградских художников 1956 года. Каталог. Л., Ленинградский художник, 1958. С.6.
- Осенняя выставка произведений ленинградских художников 1958 года. Каталог. Л., Художник РСФСР, 1959. С.6.
- Выставка произведений ленинградских художников 1960 года. Каталог. Л., Художник РСФСР, 1963. С.7.
- Выставка произведений ленинградских художников 1960 года. Каталог. Л., Художник РСФСР, 1961. С.8.
- Выставка произведений ленинградских художников 1961 года. Каталог. Л., Художник РСФСР, 1964. С.8.
- Ленинград. Зональная выставка 1964 года. Каталог. Л, Художник РСФСР, 1965. C.8.
- Каталог весенней выставки произведений ленинградских художников 1965 года. Л., Художник РСФСР, 1970. С.7.
- Наш современник. Зональная выставка произведений ленинградских художников 1975 года. Каталог. Л., Художник РСФСР, 1980. C.11.
- Портрет современника. Пятая выставка произведений ленинградских художников 1976 года. Каталог. Л., Художник РСФСР, 1983. С.6.
- Autumn Exhibition of works by Leningrad artists of 1978. Exhibition Catalogue. - Leningrad: Khudozhnik RSFSR, 1983. P.5.
- Зональная выставка произведений ленинградских художников 1980 года. Каталог. Л., Художник РСФСР, 1983. C.9.
- Directory of Members of the Union of Artists of USSR. Vol.1. Moscow, Soviet artist, 1979. P.71.
- Directory of members of the Leningrad branch of Union of Artists of Russian Federation. Leningrad, Khudozhnik RSFSR, 1987. P.9.
- Peinture Russe. Catalogue. Paris, Drouot Richelieu, 24 Septembre 1991. P.43-44.
- Ленинградские художники. Живопись 1950—1980 годов. Каталог. СПб., 1994. С.3.
- Этюд в творчестве ленинградских художников. Выставка произведений. Каталог. СПб., 1994. С.3.
- Лирика в произведениях художников военного поколения. Выставка произведений. Каталог. СПб., 1995. С.3.
- Живопись 1940—1990 годов. Ленинградская школа. Выставка произведений. СПб., 1996. С.3.
- Matthew C. Bown. Dictionary of 20th Century Russian and Soviet Painters 1900-1980s. - London: Izomar, 1998. ISBN 0-9532061-0-6, ISBN 978-0-9532061-0-0.
- Sergei V. Ivanov. Unknown Socialist Realism. The Leningrad School. St Petersburg: NP-Print, 2007. pp. 9, 20, 21, 356, 387, 388, 390, 392-395, 398, 400, 404, 405. ISBN 5-901724-21-6, ISBN 978-5-901724-21-7.
- Иванов С. Тихая жизнь за ленинградским столом // Петербургские искусствоведческие тетради. Выпуск 23. СПб., 2012. С.90-97.
- Taisia Afonina. Still-life with Pussy-Willow // 80 лет Санкт-Петербургскому Союзу художников. Юбилейная выставка. СПб., «Цветпринт», 2012. С.203.
- Sergei V. Ivanov. The Leningrad School of Painting. Essays on the History. St Petersburg, ARKA Gallery Publishing, 2019.
