= Anatoli Nenartovich =

Russian painter

Anatoli Akimovich Nenartovich
- Born: 10 July 1915; Kukhotskaya Volya, Minsk Province, Belorussia, Russian Empire
- Died: 1 January 1988 (aged 72); Leningrad, USSR
- Education: Tavricheskaya Art School, Repin Institute of Arts
- Known for: Painting
- Movement: Realism

Anatoli Nenartovich (Russian: Анато́лий Ненарто́вич; 10 July 1915 – 1 January 1988) was a Soviet Russian painter, who lived and worked in Leningrad and known as representative of the Leningrad school of painting, most famous for his cityscapes with a road building works scenes.

== Biography ==
Anatoli Akimovich Nenartovich was born on 10 July 1915 in the village of Kukhotskaya Volya, Minsk Province, Belorussia, Russian Empire, in a teacher's family.

In 1935 Anatoli Nenartovich came to Leningrad and three years later entered at the Tavricheskaya Art School.

After the beginning of the Great Patriotic War (1941–1945) he took part in the defense of Lutsk, Kiev, in the battles for Voronezh, in the heaviest defensive battles at the Panfilovo and Filonovo stations near Stalingrad. Anatoli Nenartovich finished the war in the operational department of the headquarters of the 8th Air Defense Corps of the South-Western Front. He was wounded, awarded with the medal For victory over Germany.

Anatoli Nenartovich (1915–1988). Asphalt-laying ladies. 1961.

After demobilization in 1945 Anatoli Nenartovich continued his studies and graduated from Tavricheskaya Art School in 1949. Since 1947 he was married to Nadezhda Shteinmiller, a well-known Leningrad artist.

In 1950 Anatoli Nenartovich joined the painting department of the Leningrad Institute of Painting, Sculpture and Architecture. He studied with Leonid Khudiakov, Vasily Sokolov, Alexander Zaytsev.

In 1956 Anatoli Nenartovich graduated from Leningrad Institute of Painting, Sculpture and Architecture namen after Ilya Repin in Boris Ioganson's personal Art Studio. His graduation work was a historical painting named Year of 1905. At the Semyanikov works, dedicated to events of the first Russian revolution of 1905.

Since 1956 Anatoli Nenartovich took part in Art Exhibitions. He painted genre and historical paintings, cityscapes, still lifes, sketches from life, working in oil and tempera technique. In 1956 he was admitted to the Leningrad Union of Artists.

Anatoli Nenartovich is most noted for his cityscapes and sketches from the life, depicting urban scenes with a road and building works. A most actively he developed this motives in the works of the 1950s and the first half of the 1960s. His paintings are characterized by a decorative style and constructive role of the color stains. The colors of his works are bright, saturated, built upon the loud of light and shadow contrasts and exquisite color relationships.

Anatoli Nenartovich is the author of the paintings and cityscape etudes Winter Ship camp on the Neva River, In Winter at the Bridge of Lieutenant Schmidt (both of 1949), Asphalting of a street″ (1956), Construction of Hydro-Electric Power station″, ″A Central heating line laying″ (both 1957), ″Leningrad builders″, ″A Leningrad street″, Laying of the Heating pipe-line (both 1958), ″Women on Asphalting works″, ″Asphalt laying works on Leningrad street″, ″A Gas-pipe laying″, ″Asphalting workers″, ″Asphalting of the street″ (all 1959), Plant (1960), Asphalt-laying ladies (1961), Birches, Sunny (1963), Asphalt Pavers (1961), Asphalt Pavers, New District, Yachts, On the Outskirts (all 1964), Lev Tolstoy Square (1973), Still Life on Red Material (1979), Still Life with a Tea Cup (1980), Still Life with a Watermelon (1981), and others.

Anatoli Akimovich Nenartovich died on 1 January 1988 in Leningrad, USSR. His paintings reside in art museums and private collections in Russia, England, in the U.S., Japan, and throughout the world. In 2018 The National Association of Women in Construction (USA) selected painting of Anatoli Nenartovich Asphalt-laying ladies (1961) for the poster of Annual Conference.

== See also ==
- Leningrad School of Painting
- Saint Petersburg Union of Artists
- List of 20th-century Russian painters

== Bibliography ==
- Осенняя выставка произведений ленинградских художников 1958 года. Каталог. Л., Художник РСФСР, 1959. С.27.
- Выставка произведений ленинградских художников 1960 года. Л., Художник РСФСР, 1961. C.29.
- Зональная выставка "Ленинград". Л., Художник РСФСР, 1965. C.36.
- Каталог весенней выставки произведений ленинградских художников 1965 года. Л., Художник РСФСР, 1970. С.22.
- Весенняя выставка произведений ленинградских художников. Каталог. Л., Художник РСФСР, 1974. С.9.
- Зональная выставка произведений ленинградских художников 1980 года. Каталог. Л., Художник РСФСР, 1983. С.18
- Directory of members of the Leningrad branch of Union of Artists of Russian Federation. Leningrad, Khudozhnik RSFSR, 1987. P.91.
- Этюд в творчестве ленинградских художников. Выставка произведений. Каталог. СПб, 1994. С.6.
- Натюрморт в живописи 1940-1990-х годов. Ленинградская школа. Каталог. СПб, 1996. С.4.
- Matthew C. Bown. Dictionary of 20th Century Russian and Soviet Painters 1900-1980s. London, Izomar, 1998.
- Sergei V. Ivanov. Unknown Socialist Realism. The Leningrad School. Saint Petersburg, NP-Print Edition, 2007. P.9, 18, 21, 366, 390, 393-395, 402, 404, 405.
- Anniversary Directory graduates of Saint Petersburg State Academic Institute of Painting, Sculpture, and Architecture named after Ilya Repin, Russian Academy of Arts. 1915–2005. Saint Petersburg, Pervotsvet Publishing House, 2007. P.76.
