= Alexander Koroviakov =

Russian painter

Alexander Petrovich Koroviakov
- Born: 16 November 1912; Berdskaya, Orenburg Province, Russian Empire
- Died: 12 June 1993 (aged 80); Saint Petersburg
- Education: Repin Institute of Arts
- Known for: Painting, Art teaching
- Movement: Realism

Alexander Petrovich Koroviakov (Russian: Алекса́ндр Петро́вич Коровя́ков; 16 November 1912 – 12 June 1993) was a Soviet, Russian painter and art teacher, lived and worked in Leningrad – Saint Petersburg, a member of the Saint Petersburg Union of Artists (before 1992 the Leningrad branch of Union of Artists of Russian Federation), regarded as a representative of the Leningrad school of painting.

== Biography ==
Koroviakov was born on 16 November 1912 in Berdskaya, near Orenburg, Orenburg Province, Russian Empire.

In 1932 Alexander Koroviakov entered to the Fine Art College (Penza). After graduating he comes to Leningrad and continued his study at Leningrad Institute of Painting, Sculpture and Architecture named after Ilya Repin since 1937. He studied with Boris Fogel, Genrikh Pavlovsky, and Semion Abugov.

In 1941, July, Alexander Koroviakov has gone to the Red Army as a volunteer from the last academic year. Не took part in Volhovsky Front, in the battles for Leningrad, in the liberation of Baltic states. Не was wounded and demobilized as a sergeant in 1945. Alexander Koroviakov was awarded by an Order of the Red Star, the Medal "For the Victory over Germany in the Great Patriotic War 1941–1945" and the Medal "For the Defence of Leningrad".

In September 1945 Alexander Koroviakov resumed his study in the Leningrad Institute of Painting, Sculpture and Architecture named after Ilya Repin and graduated from Rudolf Frentz workshop in 1947. His degree work was a "Wounded Commander". In 1947 he came back to Penza for teaching painting and drawing in Fine Art College.

Since 1949 Alexander Koroviakov has participated in Art Exhibitions. He painted portraits, landscapes, still lifes, genre paintings. Most famous for his still life paintings and cityscapes of Leningrad.

In the 1954 Alexander Koroviakov returned to Leningrad and start to teach painting and drawing in the famous Leningrad Secondary Art School under the Academy of Arts of the USSR, where he worked until 1983.

Alexander Koroviakov was very active in the exhibition life of Leningrad. In 1956 he took part at Autumn exhibition (Leningrad, 1956) where he demonstrated the works: "The First Snow" and "The Palace Square" (both 1956). He designated his main direction of the creation: Leningrad cityscape from this moment. His basic technique was working directly from life. Among his works there were "Spring in Leningrad", "St. Isaak's Square", "Near the Pier" (all 1957), "Kronwerk Strait" (1960), "Stadium under the name of Lenin", "Lenin Street", "Factory District" (all 1960), "At the Islands", "After the Snowfall", "Leningrad" (all 1962), "Wet Asphalt" (1963), "Winter Palace", "Near Peter and Paul Fortress" (both 1965), "On the Nevka River" (1964) and many others. Besides the Leningrad motifs Alexander Koroviakov also worked on tradition landscape. He preferred intimate subjects: a corner of autumn garden or snow-covered yard, sparkling of light spots on the water. For example, in the works "Autumn Garden" (1965) and "At the Seliger Lake" (1965). In 1960-1980 Alexander Koroviakov was keen by theme of Still life. His compositions were original, complicated by their technique and had associative content. Like in "Autumn Still life" (1972), "Dog Rose" (1969), "Still life with Cabbage" (1972),"Bouquet" (1979). Alexander Koroviakov experimented a lot on painting technique, he tended to effects of capacity, semitransparency and polycoating of image. In 1989 -1992 his works were presented at auctions and exhibitions of Russian paintings at France with great successes.

Alexander Koroviakov was a member of the Leningrad Union of Soviet Artists since 1955.

Alexander Petrovich Koroviakov died on 12 June 1993 in Saint Petersburg in the eighty-first year of life. His paintings reside in Art museums and private collections in Russia, Japan, in the U.S., China, France, and throughout the world.

== See also ==
- Leningrad School of Painting
- List of painters of Saint Petersburg Union of Artists
- List of the Russian Landscape painters
- Saint Petersburg Union of Artists

== Bibliography ==
- Центральный Государственный Архив литературы и искусства. СПб. Ф.78. Оп.8.ч.2. Д.309.
- Осенняя выставка произведений ленинградских художников. 1956 года. Каталог. Л., Ленинградский художник, 1958. С.14.
- 1917—1957. Выставка произведений ленинградских художников. Каталог. Л., Ленинградский художник, 1958. С. 18.
- Осенняя выставка произведений ленинградских художников 1958 года. Каталог. Л., Художник РСФСР, 1959. С.15.
- Выставка произведений ленинградских художников 1960 года. Каталог. Л., Художник РСФСР, 1963. С.11.
- Выставка произведений ленинградских художников 1960 года. Каталог. Л., Художник РСФСР, 1961. С.22.
- Осенняя выставка произведений ленинградских художников 1962 года. Каталог. Л., Художник РСФСР, 1962. С.15.
- Ленинград. Зональная выставка. Л., Художник РСФСР, 1965. С.27.
- Каталог весенней выставки произведений ленинградских художников 1965 года. Л., Художник РСФСР, 1970. С.17.
- Каталог произведений художников Российской Федерации, переданных в дар организациям и учреждениям культуры (1963—1971 гг.). М., СХ РСФСР, 1972. С.51.
- Справочник членов Союза художников СССР. Т.1. М., Советский художник, 1979. С.540.
- Выставки советского изобразительного искусства. Справочник. Т.5. 1954—1958 годы. М., Советский художник, 1981. С.57, 259, 386, 348, 571.
- Справочник членов Ленинградской организации Союза художников РСФСР. Л., Художник РСФСР, 1987. С.62.
- Peinture Russe. Catalogue. Paris, Drouot Richelieu, 18 Fevrier 1991. Р.7,23—24.
- Sots’Art a St Petersbourg. Catalogue. St Germain en Laye, 23 Fevrier 1992. Р.6.
- Выставка произведений художников — участников Великой Отечественной войны Санкт-Петербургского Союза художников России. СПб., ПСХ, 1993. С.3.
- Ленинградские художники. Живопись 1950—1980 годов. Каталог. СПб., Выставочный центр ПСХ, 1994. С.3.
- Этюд в творчестве ленинградских художников. Выставка произведений. Каталог. СПб., Мемориальный музей Н. А. Некрасова, 1994. С.4.
- Лирика в произведениях художников военного поколения. Выставка произведений. Каталог. СПб., Мемориальный музей Н. А. Некрасова, 1995. С.4.
- Живопись 1940—1990 годов. Ленинградская школа. Выставка произведений. СПб., Мемориальный музей Н. А. Некрасова, 1996. С.3.
- Натюрморт в живописи 1940—1990 годов. Ленинградская школа. Каталог выставки. СПб., Мемориальный музей Н. А. Некрасова, 1997. С.3.
- Мы помним... Художники, искусствоведы — участники Великой Отечественной войны. М., Союз художников России, 2000. С.145.
- Sergei V. Ivanov. Unknown Socialist Realism. The Leningrad School. Saint Petersburg: NP-Print Edition, 2007. P.9, 18, 21, 27, 54, 300, 336, 342, 345, 346, 349, 362, 387, 390—396, 403—405, 431. ISBN 5-901724-21-6, ISBN 978-5-901724-21-7
- Юбилейный Справочник выпускников Санкт-Петербургского академического института живописи, скульптуры и архитектуры имени И. Е. Репина Российской Академии художеств. 1915—2005. СПб., «Первоцвет», 2007. С.58.
- Коровяков А. П. Стадион Ленина // 80 лет Санкт-Петербургскому Союзу художников. Юбилейная выставка. СПб., «Цветпринт», 2012. С.204.
