= Mikhail Kaneev =

Russian painter

Mikhail Alexandrovich Kaneev
- Born: 5 April 1923; Kostroma Province, USSR
- Died: 6 March 1983 (aged 59); Leningrad, USSR
- Education: Repin Institute of Arts
- Known for: Painting
- Movement: Realism

Mikhail Alexandrovich Kaneev (Russian: Кане́ев Михаи́л Алекса́ндрович; 5 April 1923 – 6 March 1983) was a Soviet Russian painter and art teacher, lived and worked in Leningrad, a member of the Leningrad Union of Artists, regarded as a known representative of the Leningrad school of painting, most famous for his cityscapes of Leningrad and ancient Russian towns.

== Biography ==
Mikhail Alexandrovich Kaneev was born on 5 April 1923 in Kaneevo village, Kostroma Province of USSR. In 1927 his family moved to Leningrad. In 1937 Mikhail Kaneev entered in the Leningrad Secondary Art School (now known as the Art School named after Boris Ioganson) at the All-Russian Academy of Arts, which ends in 1941.

In the same year Mikhail Kaneev entered at the first course of Department of Painting at the Leningrad Institute of Painting, Sculpture and Architecture. Since the beginning of the Great Patriotic War he was drafted into the Red Army and returned to classes only after the Victory in 1945. He studied of Ivan Stepashkin, Leonid Ovsiannikov, Mikhail Avilov, and Yuri Neprintsev.

In 1951 Mikhail Kaneev graduated from Ilya Repin Institute in Rudolf Frentz workshop. His graduation work was historical painting "By Stalin's route" (the first ever nonstop flight by Valery Chkalov, Georgiy Baidukov, and Alexander Beliakov on the route Moscow – Vancouver in 1937).

Since 1953 Mikhail Kaneev has participated in Art Exhibitions. He painted landscapes, cityscapes, genre paintings, etudes done from nature. Mostly known as a master of the cityscapes of the Leningrad and ancient Russian towns. Decorative and graphic style of his paintings were distinguished by clarity of the silhouette, black and white contrasts. The artist often used a black stroke that makes it possible to paint the light places without the addition of white pigment, seeking the intensity of color.

Mikhail Kaneev was a member of the Leningrad Union of Artists since 1953. In 1961–1983 Kaneev taught at the Herzen Pedagogical University in Leningrad, where he was professor and a head of Drawing Department. In 1982 Mikhail Kaneev was awarded the Honorary title of the Honored Art Worker of the Russian Federation.

Mikhail Alexandrovich Kaneev died in Leningrad on 6 March 1983 in the sixtieth year of life. His paintings reside in State Russian Museum, in Art museums and private collections in Russia, USA, France, England, Japan, and throughout the world.

== See also ==
- Leningrad School of Painting
- List of Russian artists
- List of 20th-century Russian painters
- List of painters of Saint Petersburg Union of Artists
- List of the Russian Landscape painters
- Saint Petersburg Union of Artists

== Bibliography ==
- Осенняя выставка произведений ленинградских художников 1956 года. Каталог. Л., Ленинградский художник, 1958. С.12.
- 1917–1957. Выставка произведений ленинградских художников. Каталог. Л., Ленинградский художник, 1958. С.16.
- Осенняя выставка произведений ленинградских художников 1958 года. Каталог. Л., Художник РСФСР, 1959. С.13.
- Выставка произведений ленинградских художников 1960 года. Каталог. Л., Художник РСФСР, 1961. С.20.
- Exhibition of modern Soviet Painting. 1983. Gekkoso Gallery. Catalogue. Tokyo, 1983. P. 18.
- Artists of the USSR. Biography and Bibliography Dictionary. Vol. 4, part 2. Moscow, Iskusstvo. 1995. P. 170.
- Matthew C. Bown. Dictionary of 20th Century Russian and Soviet Painters 1900-1980s. London, Izomar. 1998. ISBN 0-9532061-0-6, ISBN 978-0-9532061-0-0.
- Верность традициям. Художник-педагог М. А. Канеев. СПБ, Издательство РПГУ им. А. И. Герцена. 2005.
- Sergei V. Ivanov. Unknown Socialist Realism. The Leningrad School. Saint Petersburg, NP-Print Edition, 2007. P. 9, 20, 21, 361, 388, 390–402, 404–406. ISBN 5-901724-21-6, ISBN 978-5-901724-21-7.
- Anniversary Directory graduates of Saint Petersburg State Academic Institute of Painting, Sculpture, and Architecture named after Ilya Repin, Russian Academy of Arts. 1915–2005. Saint-Petersburg, Pervotsvet Publishing. 2007. P. 64.
