= Boris Korneev (painter) =

Russian painter (1922–1973)

- Борис Корнеев
- Born: 15 February 1922; Petrozavodsk, Soviet Russia
- Died: 24 December 1973 (aged 51); Leningrad, USSR
- Education: Repin Institute of Arts
- Known for: Painting; art teaching
- Movement: Realism
- Awards: Honored Artist of the Russian Federation

Boris Vasilievich Korneev (Russian: Борис Васильевич Корнеев; 15 February 1922 – 24 December 1973) was a Soviet Russian painter and art teacher, Honored Artist of the Russian Federation, professor of the Leningrad Institute of Painting, Sculpture and Architecture named after Ilya Repin, lived and worked in Leningrad, regarded as one of the major representatives of the Leningrad school of painting, most famous for his genre painting and portraits.

== Biography ==
Boris Vasilievich Korneev was born on 15 February 1922 in Petrozavodsk, Karelia Province, Soviet Russia. In 1938, Boris Korneev entered the Leningrad Art Colledge and graduated only after the war. During the war he was in the army at 749 infantry and participated in the breakthrough of the Blockade of Leningrad at the liberation of Baltic countries, Karelia, Poland, Czechoslovakia. He was awarded by Order of Glory third class, Order of the Badge of Honour, Medal "For Courage", Medal "For the Defence of Leningrad", Medal "For the Victory over Germany in the Great Patriotic War 1941–1945", Medal "For the Liberation of Prague".

In 1946, Korneev entered to the painting department of the Leningrad Institute of Painting, Sculpture and Architecture named after Ilya Repin and graduated from it in 1952. His professors were Boris Fogel, Semion Abugov, Victor Oreshnikov, Yuri Neprintsev, Genrikh Pavlovsky, Andrei Mylnikov. His principal professor was Victor Oreshnikov and the diploma work was "Schoolchildren at the Concert in Leningrad Philharmonic" (Altai State Museum of Fine Arts).

Since 1952, Boris Korneev has participated in art exhibitions. He painted portraits, genre paintings, landscapes, and still lifes. His personal exhibitions were in the Museum of Academy of Arts Leningrad (1975), and in the Nekrasov Apartment Museum Saint Petersburg (1997). In 1989 - 1992 his works were presented in auctions and exhibitions of Russian painting L' Ecole de Leningrad at France.

Boris Korneev was a member of the Leningrad Union of Artists since 1954.

In years 1962–1973 Boris Korneev worked as a teacher of Ilya Repin Institute and a professor of Drawing Department since (1973). Since 1970 he was a head of Painting section of the Leningrad Union of Artists, a deputy vice-chairman of the Leningrad Union of Artists and a Secretary of the Union of Artists of Russian Federation.

In 1971 he was awarded by Order of the Badge of Honour.

In 1965 he was taking possession of Honored Artist of the Russian Federation after his series "Roads of War".

The leading genres of his creation were theme painting and portrait oа contemporary. An artist was attracted by heroic subjects and by strong and romantic personality. Among his works: Main Street in Biysk (1953), Altay (Teletskoe Lake)?, Portrait of Artist M. A. Kozlovskaya (both 1954), Birch, Andrei, Sunday (all 1956), Portrait of Artist V. F. Zagonek, Northern Night (both1957), Severe Land. Spring, Great Bay (both1958), Katya Baltina from the Brigade of Finishers (1959), Development of North, To the Evening, Workwoman (all 1960), Country needs Metall. Geologists (1961), Wet Morning, Selfportrait (both1962), Ice Highway. Ladoga 23 of April 1942, Discoverer of Yakutia Diamonds L. A. Popugaev, Road of Life, The Year of 1941 (all 1964), Kola makes a noisy (1966), Country, In the Steppe near Kherson, Gold of Polar Region (all 1967), Portrait of Herdsman V. Baykov (1970), M. M. Eparyn, capitan of Murmansk Fish Port, Cosmetologist А. Sakeranskaya, Portrait of Son (all 1971), At the Vacations, Tanya, N. E. Efimov, worker of Factory Printing Court, Former Commander of Company of 466 Regiment of Leningrad Front, Leningrad. The Year of 1944 (all 1972), Returning, Girl against a Pink background (both 1973).

Boris Vasilievich Korneev died on December 24, 1973, in Leningrad at age 51. His paintings reside in the State Russian Museum, State Tretyakov gallery, in Art museums and private collections in Russia, in the U.S., England, France, and others.

== See also ==
- Leningrad School of Painting
- List of Russian artists
- List of 20th-century Russian painters
- List of painters of Saint Petersburg Union of Artists
- List of the Russian Landscape painters
- Saint Petersburg Union of Artists

== Bibliography ==
- Весенняя выставка произведений ленинградских художников 1954 года. Каталог. Л., Изогиз, 1954. С.12.
- Осенняя выставка произведений ленинградских художников 1956 года. Каталог. Leningrad, Leningrad artist, 1958. P.14.
- 1917 — 1957. Выставка произведений ленинградских художников. Каталог. Leningrad, Khudozhnik RSFSR, 1958. P.18.
- All-Union Art Exhibition of 1957 dedicated to the 40th Anniversary of October Revolution. Catalogue. Moscow, Soviet artist, 1957. P.37.
- The Fall Exhibition of works by Leningrad artists of 1958. Catalogue. Leningrad, Khudozhnik RSFSR, 1959. P.15.
- Шведова В. Над чем работают ленинградские художники // Художник. 1959, № 9. — С. 5—9.
- Выставка произведений ленинградских художников 1960 года. Каталог — Л.: Художник РСФСР, 1963. — С.11.
- Выставка произведений ленинградских художников 1960 года. Каталог — Л.: Художник РСФСР, 1961. — С.22.
- "Soviet Russia" the First Republican exhibition of 1960. Catalogue. Moscow, Ministry of culture of Russian Federation, 1960. P.43.
- Шмаринов Д. Новый этап — новые задачи // Художник. 1960, № 8. С.2.
- Выставка произведений ленинградских художников 1961 года. Каталог Л., Художник РСФСР, 1964. С.22.
- Герман М. Первые впечатления. Заметки о живописи и графике на осенней выставке // Вечерний Ленинград, 1961, 23 сентября.
- Вишняков Б. С позиций жизненной правды // Художник. 1962, № 2. С.8.
- Осенняя выставка произведений ленинградских художников 1962 года. Каталог Л., Художник РСФСР, 1962. С.15.
- Леонова Н. Герои картин — советские люди // Вечерний Ленинград, 1964, 18 января.
- Ленинград. Зональная выставка 1964 года. Каталог. Л, Художник РСФСР, 1965. C.26.
- Молдавский Д. «Ленинград». На зональных художественных выставках // Литературная Россия, 1964, 27 ноября.
- Буткевич О. От находок к открытиям. Заметки с выставки «Ленинград» // Советская культура, 1964, 26 декабря.
- Дмитренко А. Взором современника // Смена, 1964, 27 декабря.
- Кривенко И. «Ленинград» (раздел живописи) // Художник. 1965, № 3. — С.27—36.
- Вьюнова И. Главный герой — современник // Искусство. 1965, № 3. — С.9.
- Советская Россия. Вторая Республиканская художественная выставка. Каталог — М.: Советский художник, 1965. — С.22.
- Третья Республиканская художественная выставка «Советская Россия». Каталог. М.: МК РСФСР, 1967. — C.32.
- Весенняя выставка произведений ленинградских художников 1971 года. Каталог — Л.: Художник РСФСР, 1972. — С.10.
- Наш современник. Каталог выставки произведений ленинградских художников 1971 года — Л.: Художник РСФСР, 1972. — С.13.
- Наш современник. Вторая выставка произведений ленинградских художников 1972 года — Л.: Художник РСФСР, 1973. — С.7.
- Наш современник. Третья выставка произведений ленинградских художников 1973 года — Л.: Художник РСФСР, 1974. — С.9.
- По Родной стране. Выставка произведений ленинградских художников. Каталог. — Л.: Художник РСФСР, 1974. — С.15.
- Наш современник. Зональная выставка произведений ленинградских художников 1975 года. Каталог — Л.: Художник РСФСР, 1980. — С.17.
- Дмитренко А. Мир современника. // Ленинградская правда, 1975, 12 октября.
- Советская Россия. Пятая республиканская выставка. — М.: Советский художник, 1975. — С.22.
- Борис Васильевич Корнеев. Каталог выставки произведений. — Л.: Художник РСФСР, 1975. — 52 с.
- Изобразительное искусство Ленинграда. Каталог выставки — Л.: Художник РСФСР, 1976. — С.20.
- Портрет современника. Пятая выставка произведений ленинградских художников 1976 года. Каталог — Л.: Художник РСФСР, 1983. — С.12.
- Выставка произведений ленинградских художников, посвящённая 40-летию полного освобождения Ленинграда от вражеской блокады. Каталог — Л.: Художник РСФСР, 1984. — С.10,27.
- L' École de Leningrad. Auction Catalogue. — Paris: Drouot Richelieu, 16Juin 1989. — p. 46-47.
- L' École de Leningrad. Auction Catalogue. — Paris: Drouot Richelieu, 27 Novembre 1989. — p. 27.
- L' École de Leningrad. Auction Catalogue. — Paris: Drouot Richelieu, 12 Mars 1990. — p. 72-73.
- Peinture Russe. Catalogue. — Paris: Drouot Richelieu, 18 Fevrier, 1991. — p. 7,57.
- L' École de Leningrad. Auction Catalogue. — Paris: Drouot Richelieu, 11 Juin 1990. — p. 58-59.
- L' École de Leningrad. Auction Catalogue. — Paris: Drouot Richelieu, 21 Decembre 1990. — p. 10-11.
- Ленинградские художники. Живопись 1950—1980 годов. Каталог — Санкт-Петербург: Выставочный центр ПСХ, 1994. — С.3.
- Этюд в творчестве ленинградских художников. Выставка произведений. Каталог — Санкт-Петербург: Мемориальный музей Н. А. Некрасова, 1994. — С.4.
- Живопись 1940—1990 годов. Ленинградская школа. Выставка произведений. — Санкт-Петербург: Мемориальный музей Н. А. Некрасова, 1996. — С.3.
- Борис Корнеев. Живопись. Выставка произведений к 75-летию со дня рождения. Каталог. — Санкт-Петербург: Мемориальный музей Н. А. Некрасова, 1997. — 6 с.
- Связь времён. 1932—1997. Художники — члены Санкт-Петербургского Союза художников России. Каталог выставки. — Санкт-Петербург: ЦВЗ «Манеж», 1997. — С.34,283.
- Matthew C. Bown. Dictionary of 20th Century Russian and Soviet Painters 1900-1980s. – London: Izomar 1998. ISBN 0-9532061-0-6, ISBN 978-0-9532061-0-0.
- Мы помним… Художники, искусствоведы — участники Великой Отечественной войны. — М.: Союз художников России, 2000. — С.144.
- Sergei V. Ivanov. Unknown Socialist Realism. The Leningrad School. – Saint Petersburg: NP-Print Edition, 2007. – pp. 9, 20, 21, 24. 362, 389–399, 403–406, 442, 446. ISBN 5-901724-21-6, ISBN 978-5-901724-21-7.
