= Anatoli Vasiliev =

Russian painter

Anatoli Ilych Vasiliev
- Born: 18 March 1917; Petrograd, Russian Empire
- Died: 4 June 1994 (aged 77); Saint Petersburg, Russian Federation
- Education: Repin Institute of Arts
- Known for: Painting
- Movement: Realism
- Awards: Order of Red Star

Anatoli Ilych Vasiliev (Russian: Анато́лий Ильи́ч Васи́льев; 18 March 1917 – 4 June 1994) was a Russian and Soviet realist painter, who lived and worked in Leningrad. He was a member of the Saint Petersburg Union of Artists (before 1992 named as the Leningrad branch of Union of Artists of Russian Federation), and regarded as one of the representatives of the Leningrad school of painting, most famous for his historical paintings and etudes done from nature.

== Biography ==
Anatoli Ilych Vasiliev was born on 18 March 1917 in Petrograd (former Saint Petersburg), Russian Empire, in a working-class family. In 1934 he entered at the Tavricheskaya Art School, where he studied under S. Bootler, S. Chugunov, V. Levitsky, and M. Aslamazian.

After graduation in 1938, Anatoli Vasiliev was adopted at the first course of Department of Painting at the Leningrad Institute of Painting, Sculpture and Architecture, where he studied under noted educators Veniamin Belkin, Pavel Naumov, Mikhail Bernshtein, Nikolai Rutkovsky, and Igor Grabar.

In July 1941 Vasiliev as volunteer went into the Red Army and took part in the Great Patriotic War, which led the Soviet people against Nazi Germany and its allies. He participated in the Battle of Leningrad, and in the battles of Narva, Shlisselburg, and Kingisepp. He was wounded and marked by military awards.

After demobilization in 1945, Anatoli Vasiliev continued his studies in the Leningrad Institute of Painting, Sculpture and Architecture named after Ilya Repin and graduated in 1950 from Victor Oreshnikov studio, together with Evgenia Antipova, Nina Veselova, Vecheslav Zagonek, Tatiana Kopnina, Nikolai Mukho, Alexander Pushnin, Alexander Sokolov, Yuri Tulin, and other young artists. His graduation work was history painting named "Mikhail Lomonosov - the father of Russian science"

In 1950 Anatoli Vasiliev was admitted to the Leningrad Union of Soviet Artists (since 1992 known as the Saint Petersburg Union of Artists). He has participated in art exhibitions since 1937, mainly as a master of historical paintings and etudes done from nature. From 1950 until the 1970s, he made trips through the Urals and the Kama River, visit Baikal Lake and Buryatia, and also the Russian North. His personal exhibition was in Saint-Petersburg in 1995.

Anatoli Ilych Vasiliev died on 4 June 1994 in Saint Petersburg. His paintings reside in art museums and private collections in Russia, Japan, France, England, Germany, Italy, in the U.S., and others.

== See also ==
- Leningrad School of Painting
- List of Russian artists
- List of 20th-century Russian painters
- List of painters of Saint Petersburg Union of Artists
- Saint Petersburg Union of Artists
- Academicheskaya Dacha

== Sources ==
- Artists of the peoples of the USSR. Biography Dictionary. Volume 2. - Moscow: Iskusstvo Edition, 1972. - pp. 179–180.
- Irina Romanycheva. Academic Dacha. History and traditions. - Saint Petersburg: Petropol Publishing House, 2009. - p. 83.
- Sergei V. Ivanov. Unknown Socialist Realism. The Leningrad School. - Saint Petersburg: NP-Print Edition, 2007. – pp. 9, 18, 26, 29, 52, 230, 257, 261, 358, 388, 390–400, 402–405, 413, 415, 416, 418–422. ISBN 5-901724-21-6, ISBN 978-5-901724-21-7.
