= Piotr Alberti =

Russian painter

Piotr Filipovich Alberti
- Born: November 25, 1913; Astrakhan, Russian Empire
- Died: October 7, 1994 (aged 80); Saint Petersburg, Russia
- Education: Repin Institute of Arts.
- Known for: Painting
- Movement: Realism
- Awards: Medal "For the Defence of Leningrad" Medal "For the Victory Over Germany" Medal "For Courage"

Piotr Filipovich Alberti (Russian: Пéтр Фили́ппович Альбе́рти; November 25, 1913 – October 7, 1994) was a Soviet, Russian painter, lived and worked in Leningrad, regarded as one of representatives of the Leningrad school of painting.

== Biography ==
Alberti was born November 25, 1913, in Astrakhan city, Russian Empire, on the Volga River in the family of a railway officer. In 1927 he enrolled in Astrakhan Art School, where he studied with renowned artist and art educator Pavel Vlasov, students who were Boris Kustodiev and Ivan Goryushkin-Sorokopudov. In 1932 Alberti graduated from Astrakhan Art School and left to Leningrad where he entered the preparatory course at the Russian Academy for Fine Arts.

In 1935 Alberti was admitted to the Painting Department of the Leningrad Institute of Painting, Sculpture and Architecture, where he studied until 1936, then left the studies and joined the LenIZO Association of Artists. In 1938 he married the artist Valentina Belova (d. 1955).

In 1941, Alberti volunteered for the Red Army. From October 30, 1941, to May 9, 1945, as a private soldier in Reserve Infantry Regiment 267 of the Leningrad Front, he participated in Battles at Leningrad, in the liberation of the Baltic republics. In 1944, he was seriously injured, was treated in the Leningrad military evacuation hospital № 991. He was awarded the medals "For Courage", "For Defense of Leningrad", and "For Victory over Germany".

== Creativity ==
In 1945, after demobilization, Alberti returned to work in LenIZO. For the first time he took part in Art exhibition in 1938. Since 1951 Alberti was a permanent exhibitor of the Leningrad Art exhibitions, where he showed his work among with works by the leading masters of fine arts of Leningrad. He painted portraits, landscapes, genre scenes, still lifes. Among his works of 1950 - early 1960s were «Chess Players» (1951), «Flowers» (1956), «The Anichkov Bridge», «Asphalt laying workers», «A Young woman in a Boat» (all 1959), «Still Life with Palette», «A Portrait of a Man», «A Portrait of wife» (all 1960).

In 1957, Alberti was admitted to the Union of Leningrad artists. In 1958 he married a second time on A. Sharanovich (died 1966). In 1960–1970, Alberti some times worked in House of creativity «Staraya Ladoga», visited North Caucasus and House of creativity on the Senezh Lake. In the years of 1970–1980 he participated in exhibitions of contemporary Soviet Art in Japan in the Gikosso gallery. In 1989–1992 his works were exhibited at the exhibitions and auctions of Russian paintings L'École de Leningrad and others in France, Belgium, United Kingdom.

His painting style was distinguished by a broad painting, vivid colors, energetic separate swab. Alberti often uses impasto style of blending paints and intricate texture of canvas. This is especially true of his later still lifes with fruits and flowers. Alberti attached great importance to the painting from the life. While working on the genre composition, he painted numerous nature studies, many of which have independent artistic value.

In the 1950s – early 1960s his leading genre was the portrait. Later Alberti often turned to genre composition and landscape painting. Among the best known works created in this period were genre paintings «Pioneers», «Girlfriends», «Veranda» (all 1961), «The Lesson of Labor», «Children» (1964), as well as landscapes «Young Aspen» (1968), «The Lake» (1974), and still lifes «Autumn. Still Life» (1972), «Joinery Workshop» (1976).

Since the late 1970s, Alberti was particularly keen on working in the genre of still life. He made a varied sets, but most often it was his favorite peonies, juicy watermelon, an easel with brushes and paints. Among the works of this period were «Still Life» (1977), «Still Life with Melon», «Peonies and Cherries on a Tray» (both 1980), «Peonies» (1991), «Still Life with Watermelon» (1992).

Alberti died on October 7, 1994, in Saint Petersburg in the eighty-first year of life. His paintings reside in art museums and private collections in Russia, Finland, in the U.S., Japan, Germany, England, Belgium, France, and other countries.

== See also ==
- Fine Art of Leningrad
- Leningrad School of Painting
- List of 20th-century Russian painters
- List of painters of Saint Petersburg Union of Artists
- Saint Petersburg Union of Artists

== Exhibitions ==
Principal Exhibitions by Piotr Alberti
- 1951 (Leningrad): Exhibition of works by Leningrad artists of 1951, with Piotr Alberti, Vsevolod Bazhenov, Piotr Belousov, Piotr Buchkin, Rudolf Frentz, Nikolai Galakhov, Vladimir Gorb, Tatiana Kopnina, Nikolai Kostrov, Anna Kostrova, Alexander Lubimov, Evsey Moiseenko, Mikhail Natarevich, Yuri Neprintsev, Vladimir Ovchinnikov, Sergei Osipov, Alexander Pushnin, Ivan Savenko, Gleb Savinov, Alexander Samokhvalov, Vladimir Seleznev, Alexander Shmidt, Nadezhda Shteinmiller, Nikolai Timkov, Leonid Tkachenko, Mikhail Tkachev, Yuri Tulin, Igor Veselkin, Nina Veselova, Rostislav Vovkushevsky, Vecheslav Zagonek, and other important Leningrad artists.
- 1956 (Leningrad): The Fall Exhibition of works by Leningrad artists of 1956, with Piotr Alberti, Taisia Afonina, Vsevolod Bazhenov, Irina Baldina, Nikolai Baskakov, Yuri Belov, Piotr Belousov, Olga Bogaevskaya, Piotr Buchkin, Sergei Frolov, Nikolai Galakhov, Vladimir Gorb, Abram Grushko, Alexei Eriomin, Mikhail Kaneev, Marina Kozlovskaya, Tatiana Kopnina, Maya Kopitseva, Boris Korneev, Alexander Koroviakov, Elena Kostenko, Nikolai Kostrov, Anna Kostrova, Gevork Kotiantz, Yaroslav Krestovsky, Ivan Lavsky, Oleg Lomakin, Dmitry Maevsky, Gavriil Malish, Alexei Mozhaev, Nikolai Mukho, Samuil Nevelshtein, Sergei Osipov, Vladimir Ovchinnikov, Lev Russov, Ivan Savenko, Gleb Savinov, Vladimir Seleznev, Alexander Semionov, Arseny Semionov, Yuri Shablikin, Boris Shamanov, Alexander Shmidt, Nadezhda Shteinmiller, Victor Teterin, Nikolai Timkov, Mikhail Tkachev, Mikhail Trufanov, Yuri Tulin, Boris Ugarov, Piotr Vasiliev, Igor Veselkin, Rostislav Vovkushevsky, Vecheslav Zagonek, Ruben Zakharian, Sergei Zakharov, and other important Leningrad artists.
- 1960 (Leningrad): Exhibition of works by Leningrad artists of 1960, with Piotr Alberti, Evgenia Antipova, Taisia Afonina, Genrikh Bagrov, Vsevolod Bazhenov, Nikolai Baskakov, Zlata Bizova, Olga Bogaevskaya, Nikolai Galakhov, Vladimir Gorb, Abram Grushko, Alexei Eriomin, Mikhail Kaneev, Mikhail Kozell, Marina Kozlovskaya, Boris Korneev, Alexander Koroviakov, Elena Kostenko, Nikolai Kostrov, Anna Kostrova, Gevork Kotiantz, Yaroslav Krestovsky, Boris Lavrenko, Ivan Lavsky, Oleg Lomakin, Dmitry Maevsky, Alexei Mozhaev, Evsey Moiseenko, Nikolai Mukho, Andrey Milnikov, Piotr Nazarov, Vera Nazina, Mikhail Natarevich, Samuil Nevelshtein, Dmitry Oboznenko, Sergei Osipov, Nikolai Pozdneev, Maria Rudnitskaya, Vladimir Sakson, Alexander Samokhvalov, Alexander Semionov, Arseny Semionov, Yuri Shablikin, Boris Shamanov, Alexander Shmidt, Elena Skuin, Alexander Sokolov, Alexander Stolbov, Victor Teterin, Nikolai Timkov, Yuri Tulin, Boris Ugarov, Ivan Varichev, Rostislav Vovkushevsky, Vecheslav Zagonek, Ruben Zakharian, and other important Leningrad artists.
- 1960 (Leningrad): Exhibition of works by Leningrad artists of 1960, with Piotr Alberti, Evgenia Antipova, Taisia Afonina, Genrikh Bagrov, Vsevolod Bazhenov, Irina Baldina, Nikolai Baskakov, Yuri Belov, Piotr Belousov, Olga Bogaevskaya, Piotr Buchkin, Zlata Bizova, Vladimir Chekalov, Sergei Frolov, Nikolai Galakhov, Vladimir Gorb, Elena Gorokhova, Abram Grushko, Alexei Eriomin, Mikhail Kaneev, Engels Kozlov, Marina Kozlovskaya, Tatiana Kopnina, Maya Kopitseva, Boris Korneev, Alexander Koroviakov, Elena Kostenko, Nikolai Kostrov, Anna Kostrova, Gevork Kotiantz, Vladimir Krantz, Yaroslav Krestovsky, Valeria Larina, Boris Lavrenko, Ivan Lavsky, Piotr Litvinsky, Oleg Lomakin, Dmitry Maevsky, Gavriil Malish, Nikita Medovikov, Evsey Moiseenko, Nikolai Mukho, Andrey Milnikov, Vera Nazina, Mikhail Natarevich, Anatoli Nenartovich, Samuil Nevelshtein, Dmitry Oboznenko, Vladimir Ovchinnikov, Vecheslav Ovchinnikov, Sergei Osipov, Nikolai Pozdneev, Alexander Pushnin, Lev Russov, Galina Rumiantseva, Maria Rudnitskaya, Ivan Savenko, Vladimir Sakson, Gleb Savinov, Alexander Samokhvalov, Alexander Semionov, Arseny Semionov, Yuri Shablikin, Boris Shamanov, Alexander Shmidt, Nadezhda Shteinmiller, Elena Skuin, Galina Smirnova, Alexander Sokolov, Alexander Stolbov, Victor Teterin, Nikolai Timkov, Mikhail Tkachev, Leonid Tkachenko, Mikhail Trufanov, Yuri Tulin, Boris Ugarov, Ivan Varichev, Anatoli Vasiliev, Valery Vatenin, Nina Veselova, Rostislav Vovkushevsky, Vecheslav Zagonek, Sergei Zakharov, Ruben Zakharian, and other important Leningrad artists.
- 1961 (Leningrad): Exhibition of works by Leningrad artists of 1961, with Piotr Alberti, Evgenia Antipova, Taisia Afonina, Vsevolod Bazhenov, Irina Baldina, Nikolai Baskakov, Yuri Belov, Piotr Belousov, Olga Bogaevskaya, Piotr Buchkin, Zlata Bizova, Nikolai Galakhov, Elena Gorokhova, Abram Grushko, Alexei Eriomin, Mikhail Kaneev, Mikhail Kozell, Engels Kozlov, Marina Kozlovskaya, Maya Kopitseva, Boris Korneev, Elena Kostenko, Anna Kostrova, Gevork Kotiantz, Yaroslav Krestovsky, Valeria Larina, Boris Lavrenko, Ivan Lavsky, Oleg Lomakin, Dmitry Maevsky, Gavriil Malish, Nikita Medovikov, Evsey Moiseenko, Alexei Mozhaev, Nikolai Mukho, Vera Nazina, Mikhail Natarevich, Anatoli Nenartovich, Samuil Nevelshtein, Yuri Neprintsev, Dmitry Oboznenko, Sergei Osipov, Vladimir Ovchinnikov, Nikolai Pozdneev, Alexander Pushnin, Galina Rumiantseva, Lev Russov, Maria Rudnitskaya, Ivan Savenko, Gleb Savinov, Vladimir Sakson, Alexander Samokhvalov, Vladimir Seleznev, Arseny Semionov, Alexander Semionov, Yuri Shablikin, Boris Shamanov, Alexander Shmidt, Nadezhda Shteinmiller, Elena Skuin, Galina Smirnova, Alexander Sokolov, Alexander Stolbov, Victor Teterin, Nikolai Timkov, Leonid Tkachenko, Mikhail Trufanov, Yuri Tulin, Boris Ugarov, Ivan Varichev, Anatoli Vasiliev, Piotr Vasiliev, Valery Vatenin, Lazar Yazgur, Vecheslav Zagonek, Sergei Zakharov, Maria Zubreeva, and other important Leningrad artists.
- 1962 (Leningrad): The Fall Exhibition of works by Leningrad artists of 1962, with Piotr Alberti, Evgenia Antipova, Taisia Afonina, Sergei Babkov, Irina Baldina, Nikolai Baskakov, Vsevolod Bazhenov, Yuri Belov, Dmitry Belyaev, Olga Bogaevskaya, Nikolai Galakhov, Ivan Godlevsky, Vladimir Gorb, Abram Grushko, Alexei Eremin, Mikhail Kaneev, Maria Kleschar-Samokhvalova, Maya Kopitseva, Boris Korneev, Alexander Koroviakov, Victor Korovin, Elena Kostenko, Gevork Kotiantz, Mikhail Kozell, Engels Kozlov, Marina Kozlovskaya, Yaroslav Krestovsky, Valeria Larina, Boris Lavrenko, Ivan Lavsky, Anatoli Levitin, Oleg Lomakin, Gavriil Malish, Boris Maluev, Evsey Moiseenko, Nikolai Mukho, Piotr Nazarov, Vera Nazina, Mikhail Natarevich, Yaroslav Nikolaev, Dmitry Oboznenko, Lev Orekhov, Lia Ostrova, Vladimir Ovchinnikov, Sergei Osipov, Genrikh Pavlovsky, Varlen Pen, Nikolai Pozdneev, Stepan Privedentsev, Semion Rotnitsky, Galina Rumiantseva, Ivan Savenko, Gleb Savinov, Alexander Semionov, Arseny Semionov, Nadezhda Shteinmiller, Elena Skuin, Kim Slavin, Alexander Sokolov, Alexander Stolbov, Alexander Tatarenko, Victor Teterin, Nikolai Timkov, Mikhail Trufanov, Yuri Tulin, Boris Ugarov, Ivan Varichev, Anatoli Vasiliev, Valery Vatenin, Rostislav Vovkushevsky, Vecheslav Zagonek, Elena Zhukova, and other important Leningrad artists.
- 1964 (Leningrad): The Leningrad Fine Arts Exhibition, with Piotr Alberti, Evgenia Antipova, Taisia Afonina, Irina Baldina, Nikolai Baskakov, Evgenia Baykova, Vsevolod Bazhenov, Yuri Belov, Piotr Belousov, Olga Bogaevskaya, Piotr Buchkin, Zlata Bizova, Vladimir Chekalov, Sergei Frolov, Nikolai Galakhov, Vasily Golubev, Tatiana Gorb, Abram Grushko, Alexei Eriomin, Mikhail Kaneev, Yuri Khukhrov, Mikhail Kozell, Marina Kozlovskaya, Tatiana Kopnina, Maya Kopitseva, Boris Korneev, Alexander Koroviakov, Elena Kostenko, Nikolai Kostrov, Anna Kostrova, Gevork Kotiantz, Yaroslav Krestovsky, Valeria Larina, Boris Lavrenko, Ivan Lavsky, Piotr Litvinsky, Oleg Lomakin, Dmitry Maevsky, Gavriil Malish, Evsey Moiseenko, Nikolai Mukho, Piotr Nazarov, Vera Nazina, Mikhail Natarevich, Anatoli Nenartovich, Yuri Neprintsev, Dmitry Oboznenko, Sergei Osipov, Vladimir Ovchinnikov, Nikolai Pozdneev, Alexander Pushnin, Galina Rumiantseva, Ivan Savenko, Gleb Savinov, Vladimir Sakson, Alexander Samokhvalov, Vladimir Seleznev, Arseny Semionov, Alexander Semionov, Yuri Shablikin, Boris Shamanov, Alexander Shmidt, Nadezhda Shteinmiller, Elena Skuin, Galina Smirnova, Alexander Sokolov, Ivan Sorokin, Victor Teterin, Nikolai Timkov, Mikhail Tkachev, Mikhail Trufanov, Yuri Tulin, Vitaly Tulenev, Boris Ugarov, Ivan Varichev, Anatoli Vasiliev, Piotr Vasiliev, Valery Vatenin, Lazar Yazgur, Vecheslav Zagonek, Sergei Zakharov, Ruben Zakharian, and other important Leningrad artists.
- 1965 (Leningrad): The Spring Exhibition of works by Leningrad artists of 1965, with Piotr Alberti, Evgenia Antipova, Taisia Afonina, Vsevolod Bazhenov, Yuri Belov, Olga Bogaevskaya, Vladimir Gavrilov, Irina Getmanskaya, Vasily Golubev, Irina Dobrekova, Maya Kopitseva, Alexander Koroviakov, Mikhail Kozell, Engels Kozlov, Elena Kostenko, Gevork Kotiantz, Vladimir Krantz, Valeria Larina, Boris Lavrenko, Ivan Lavsky, Oleg Lomakin, Dmitry Maevsky, Gavriil Malish, Valentina Monakhova, Nikolai Mukho, Vera Nazina, Mikhail Natarevich, Anatoli Nenartovich, Dmitry Oboznenko, Sergei Osipov, Lev Orekhov, Victor Otiev, Nikolai Pozdneev, Maria Rudnitskaya, Ivan Savenko, Vladimir Sakson, Alexander Semionov, Arseny Semionov, Boris Shamanov, Alexander Shmidt, Nadezhda Shteinmiller, Elena Skuin, Alexander Stolbov, Victor Teterin, Nikolai Timkov, Yuri Tulin, Vitaly Tulenev, Boris Ugarov, Ivan Varichev, Anatoli Vasiliev, Igor Veselkin, Rostislav Vovkushevsky, Lazar Yazgur, Vecheslav Zagonek, Ruben Zakharian, and other important Leningrad artists.
- 1968 (Leningrad): The Fall Exhibition of works by Leningrad artists of 1968, with Piotr Alberti, Vsevolod Bazhenov, Sergei Frolov, Nikolai Galakhov, Tatiana Gorb, Vladimir Gorb, Mikhail Kaneev, Mikhail Kozell, Engels Kozlov, Elena Kostenko, Nikolai Kostrov, Anna Kostrova, Gevork Kotiantz, Vladimir Krantz, Ivan Lavsky, Dmitry Maevsky, Gavriil Malish, Nikolai Mukho, Mikhail Natarevich, Sergei Osipov, Vladimir Ovchinnikov, Lev Orekhov, Victor Otiev, Maria Rudnitskaya, Ivan Savenko, Vladimir Sakson, Alexander Semionov, Arseny Semionov, Boris Shamanov, Alexander Shmidt, Elena Skuin, Alexander Stolbov, German Tatarinov, Mikhail Trufanov, Yuri Tulin, Ivan Varichev, Anatoli Vasiliev, Rostislav Vovkushevsky, Lazar Yazgur, Vecheslav Zagonek, Sergei Zakharov, Ruben Zakharian, and other important Leningrad artists.
- 1978 (Leningrad): The Fall Exhibition of works by Leningrad artists of 1978, with Piotr Alberti, Taisia Afonina, Genrikh Bagrov, Irina Baldina, Nikolai Baskakov, Evgenia Baykova, Vsevolod Bazhenov, Piotr Belousov, Veniamin Borisov, Zlata Bizova, Evgeny Chuprun, Sergei Frolov, Nikolai Galakhov, Vladimir Gorb, Irina Dobrekova, Alexei Eriomin, Mikhail Kaneev, Yuri Khukhrov, Maya Kopitseva, Elena Kostenko, Nikolai Kostrov, Anna Kostrova, Gevork Kotiantz, Mikhail Kozell, Marina Kozlovskaya, Vladimir Krantz, Dmitry Maevsky, Gavriil Malish, Nikolai Mukho, Vera Nazina, Alexander Naumov, Dmitry Oboznenko, Victor Otiev, Evgeny Pozdniakov, Alexander Semionov, Yuri Shablikin, Boris Shamanov, Alexander Stolbov, Alexander Tatarenko, German Tatarinov, Nikolai Timkov, Leonid Tkachenko, Yuri Tulin, Vitaly Tulenev, Boris Ugarov, Ivan Varichev, Anatoli Vasiliev, Ruben Zakharian, and other important Leningrad artists.
- 1994 (Saint Petersburg): Paintings of 1950-1980s by the Leningrad School's artists, with Piotr Alberti, Taisia Afonina, Vsevolod Bazhenov, Piotr Buchkin, Irina Baldina, Veniamin Borisov, Yuri Belov, Piotr Belousov, Vladimir Chekalov, Evgeny Chuprun, Nikolai Galakhov, Irina Dobrekova, Alexei Eriomin, Mikhail Kaneev, Yuri Khukhrov, Mikhail Kozell, Maya Kopitseva, Marina Kozlovskaya, Boris Korneev, Alexander Koroviakov, Elena Kostenko, Piotr Litvinsky, Boris Lavrenko, Dmitry Maevsky, Alexei Mozhaev, Valentina Monakhova, Mikhail Natarevich, Alexander Naumov, Anatoli Nenartovich, Yuri Neprintsev, Samuil Nevelshtein, Dmitry Oboznenko, Lev Orekhov, Sergei Osipov, Vladimir Ovchinnikov, Victor Otiev, Nikolai Pozdneev, Evgeny Pozdniakov, Lev Russov, Galina Rumiantseva, Kapitolina Rumiantseva, Alexander Samokhvalov, Alexander Semionov, Nadezhda Shteinmiller, German Tatarinov, Nikolai Timkov, Mikhail Tkachev, Leonid Tkachenko, Anatoli Vasiliev, Piotr Vasiliev, Rostislav Vovkushevsky, Lazar Yazgur, Vecheslav Zagonek, and other important Leningrad artists.
- 1994 (Saint Petersburg): Etudes done from nature in creativity of the Leningrad School's artists, with Piotr Alberti, Taisia Afonina, Evgenia Antipova, Vsevolod Bazhenov, Irina Baldina, Veniamin Borisov, Zlata Bizova, Vladimir Chekalov, Evgeny Chuprun, Nikolai Galakhov, Tatiana Gorb, Abram Grushko, Irina Dobrekova, Alexei Eriomin, Mikhail Kaneev, Yuri Khukhrov, Mikhail Kozell, Maya Kopitseva, Marina Kozlovskaya, Boris Korneev, Alexander Koroviakov, Elena Kostenko, Piotr Litvinsky, Boris Lavrenko, Ivan Lavsky, Dmitry Maevsky, Alexei Mozhaev, Valentina Monakhova, Nikolai Mukho, Mikhail Natarevich, Alexander Naumov, Anatoli Nenartovich, Dmitry Oboznenko, Lev Orekhov, Sergei Osipov, Vladimir Ovchinnikov, Victor Otiev, Nikolai Pozdneev, Evgeny Pozdniakov, Galina Rumiantseva, Kapitolina Rumiantseva, Lev Russov, Alexander Samokhvalov, Alexander Semionov, Nadezhda Shteinmiller, German Tatarinov, Nikolai Timkov, Mikhail Tkachev, Leonid Tkachenko, Anatoli Vasiliev, Igor Veselkin, Lazar Yazgur, Vecheslav Zagonek, Ruben Zakharian, and other important Leningrad artists.
- 1995 (Saint Petersburg): Lyrical motives in the works of artists of the war generation, with Piotr Alberti, Taisia Afonina, Evgenia Antipova, Vsevolod Bazhenov, Irina Baldina, Veniamin Borisov, Yuri Belov, Piotr Belousov, Piotr Buchkin, Vladimir Chekalov, Evgeny Chuprun, Sergei Frolov, Nikolai Galakhov, Abram Grushko, Mikhail Kaneev, Yuri Khukhrov, Mikhail Kozell, Maya Kopitseva, Marina Kozlovskaya, Boris Korneev, Alexander Koroviakov, Elena Kostenko, Ivan Lavsky, Dmitry Maevsky, Gavriil Malish, Nikolai Mukho, Mikhail Natarevich, Anatoli Nenartovich, Yuri Neprintsev, Samuil Nevelshtein, Lev Orekhov, Sergei Osipov, Vladimir Ovchinnikov, Victor Otiev, Nikolai Pozdneev, Evgeny Pozdniakov, Lev Russov, Galina Rumiantseva, Kapitolina Rumiantseva, Alexander Samokhvalov, Alexander Semionov, Alexander Shmidt, Nadezhda Shteinmiller, Alexander Sokolov, Alexander Tatarenko, German Tatarinov, Victor Teterin, Nikolai Timkov, Mikhail Tkachev, Leonid Tkachenko, Anatoli Vasiliev, Piotr Vasiliev, Igor Veselkin, Rostislav Vovkushevsky, Maria Zubreeva, and other important Leningrad artists.
- 1996 (Saint Petersburg): Paintings of 1940-1990s. The Leningrad School, with Piotr Alberti, Taisia Afonina, Vsevolod Bazhenov, Irina Baldina, Veniamin Borisov, Vladimir Chekalov, Evgeny Chuprun, Nikolai Galakhov, Tatiana Gorb, Abram Grushko, Alexei Eriomin, Mikhail Kaneev, Mikhail Kozell, Maya Kopitseva, Marina Kozlovskaya, Alexander Koroviakov, Vladimir Krantz, Boris Lavrenko, Ivan Lavsky, Piotr Litvinsky, Dmitry Maevsky, Valentina Monakhova, Mikhail Natarevich, Anatoli Nenartovich, Samuil Nevelshtein, Lev Orekhov, Sergei Osipov, Vladimir Ovchinnikov, Victor Otiev, Nikolai Pozdneev, Evgeny Pozdniakov, Lev Russov, Galina Rumiantseva, Kapitolina Rumiantseva, Alexander Samokhvalov, Alexander Semionov, Nadezhda Shteinmiller, German Tatarinov, Nikolai Timkov, Mikhail Tkachev, Leonid Tkachenko, Anatoli Vasiliev, Igor Veselkin, Rostislav Vovkushevsky, Ruben Zakharian, and other important Leningrad artists.

== Sources ==
- Центральный Государственный Архив литературы и искусства. СПб. Ф.78. Оп.8. Д.197.
- Выставка произведений ленинградских художников 1951 года. Каталог. Л., Лениздат, 1951. С.7.
- Осенняя выставка произведений ленинградских художников. 1956 года. Каталог. Л., Ленинградский художник, 1958. С.5.
- Выставка произведений художников-астраханцев и художников, учившихся или работавших в Астрахани, посвящённая 400-летию города. Каталог. Астрахань, Астраханская картинная галерея им. Б. М. Кустодиева, 1958.
- Выставка произведений ленинградских художников 1960 года. Каталог. Л., Художник РСФСР, 1963. С.7.
- Выставка произведений ленинградских художников 1960 года. Каталог. Л., Художник РСФСР, 1961. С.7.
- Выставка произведений ленинградских художников 1961 года. Каталог. Л., Художник РСФСР, 1964. С.7.
- Осенняя выставка произведений ленинградских художников 1962 года. Каталог. Л., Художник РСФСР, 1962. С.7.
- Ленинград. Зональная выставка. Л., Художник РСФСР, 1965. С.7.
- Каталог весенней выставки произведений ленинградских художников 1965 года. Л., Художник РСФСР, 1970. С.7.
- Осенняя выставка произведений ленинградских художников 1968 года. Каталог. Л., Художник РСФСР, 1971. С.5.
- Художники народов СССР. Биобиблиографический словарь. Т. 1. М., Искусство, 1970. С.119.
- Натюрморт. Выставка произведений ленинградских художников 1973 года. Живопись. Графика. Каталог. Л., Художник РСФСР, 1973. С.7.
- Каталог Осенней выставки произведений ленинградских художников 1971 года. Л., Художник РСФСР, 1973. С.5.
- Выставка произведений художников — ветеранов Великой Отечественной войны. Л., ЛОСХ РСФСР, 1977. С.3.
- Выставка произведений художников — ветеранов Великой Отечественной войны. Л., ЛОСХ РСФСР, 1978. С.3.
- Осенняя выставка произведений ленинградских художников. 1978 года. Каталог. Л., Художник РСФСР, 1983. С.5.
- Справочник членов Союза художников СССР. Т.1. М., Советский художник, 1979. С.39.
- Выставка произведений художников — ветеранов Великой Отечественной войны. Л., ЛОСХ РСФСР, 1981. С.2.
- Выставка произведений художников — ветеранов Великой Отечественной войны. Л., ЛОСХ РСФСР, 1987. С.3.
- Справочник членов Ленинградской организации Союза художников РСФСР. Л., Художник РСФСР, 1987. С.5.
- Charmes Russes. Catalogue. Paris, Drouot Richelieu. 1991, 15 Mai. Р.48-51.
- Peinture Russe. Catalogue. Paris, Drouot Richelieu. 1991, 24 Septembre. Р.53.
- L' École de Leningrad. Catalogue. Paris, Drouot Richelieu. 1991, 25 Novembre. Р.12-13.
- Charmes Russes. Catalogue. Paris, Drouot Richelieu. 1991, 9 Decembre. Р.20.
- Sots’Art a St Petersbourg. Catalogue. St Germain en Laye, 1992, 23 Fevrier. Р.1,4.
- Выставка произведений художников — участников Великой Отечественной войны Санкт-Петербургского Союза художников России. СПб., 1993. С.3.
- Ленинградские художники. Живопись 1950—1980 годов. Каталог. СПб., 1994. С.3.
- Этюд в творчестве ленинградских художников. Выставка произведений. Каталог. СПб., 1994. С.3.
- Лирика в произведениях художников военного поколения. Выставка произведений. Каталог. СПб., 1995. С.3.
- Живопись 1940—1990 годов. Ленинградская школа. Выставка произведений. СПб., 1996. С.3.
- Натюрморт в живописи 1940—1990 годов. Ленинградская школа. Каталог выставки. СПб., 1997. С.3.
- Matthew Cullerne Bown. A Dictionary of Twentieth Century Russian And Soviet Painters. 1900 — 1980s. London, Izomar Limited, 1998.
- Мы помним… Художники, искусствоведы — участники Великой Отечественной войны. М., Союз художников России, 2000. С.27.
- Иванов С. Неизвестный соцреализм. Ленинградская школа. СПб., НП-Принт, 2007. С.18, 24, 356, 389, 390, 392–397, 400, 402, 404, 405. ISBN 5-901724-21-6, ISBN 978-5-901724-21-7.
- Иванов С. Инвестиции в советскую живопись: ленинградская школа // Петербургские искусствоведческие тетради. Вып. 31. СПб, 2014. С.54-60.
- Иванов С.В. Альберти Пётр Филиппович // Страницы памяти. Справочно-биографический сборник. 1941—1945. Художники Санкт-Петербургского (Ленинградского) Союза художников — ветераны Великой Отечественной войны. СПб., Петрополис, 2014. Кн.1. С.23—25.
