= Arseny Semionov =

Russian artist (1911–1992)

- Semionov
- Born: 23 January 1911; Maksimkovo, Vitebsk Governorate, Russian Empire
- Died: 13 September 1992 (aged 81); Saint Petersburg, Russia
- Education: Repin Institute of Arts
- Known for: Painting, art teaching
- Movement: Realism
- Awards: Order of the Red Star Order of the Patriotic War 1st and 2nd class Medal For the Victory Over Germany

Arseny Nikiforovich Semionov (Russian: Арсе́ний Ники́форович Семёнов; 23 January 1911 – 13 September 1992) was a Soviet painter and art teacher who lived and worked in Leningrad. He was a member of the Leningrad Union of Artists and is regarded as one of the representatives of the Leningrad school of painting. He is most famous for his landscape and cityscape paintings.

== Biography ==
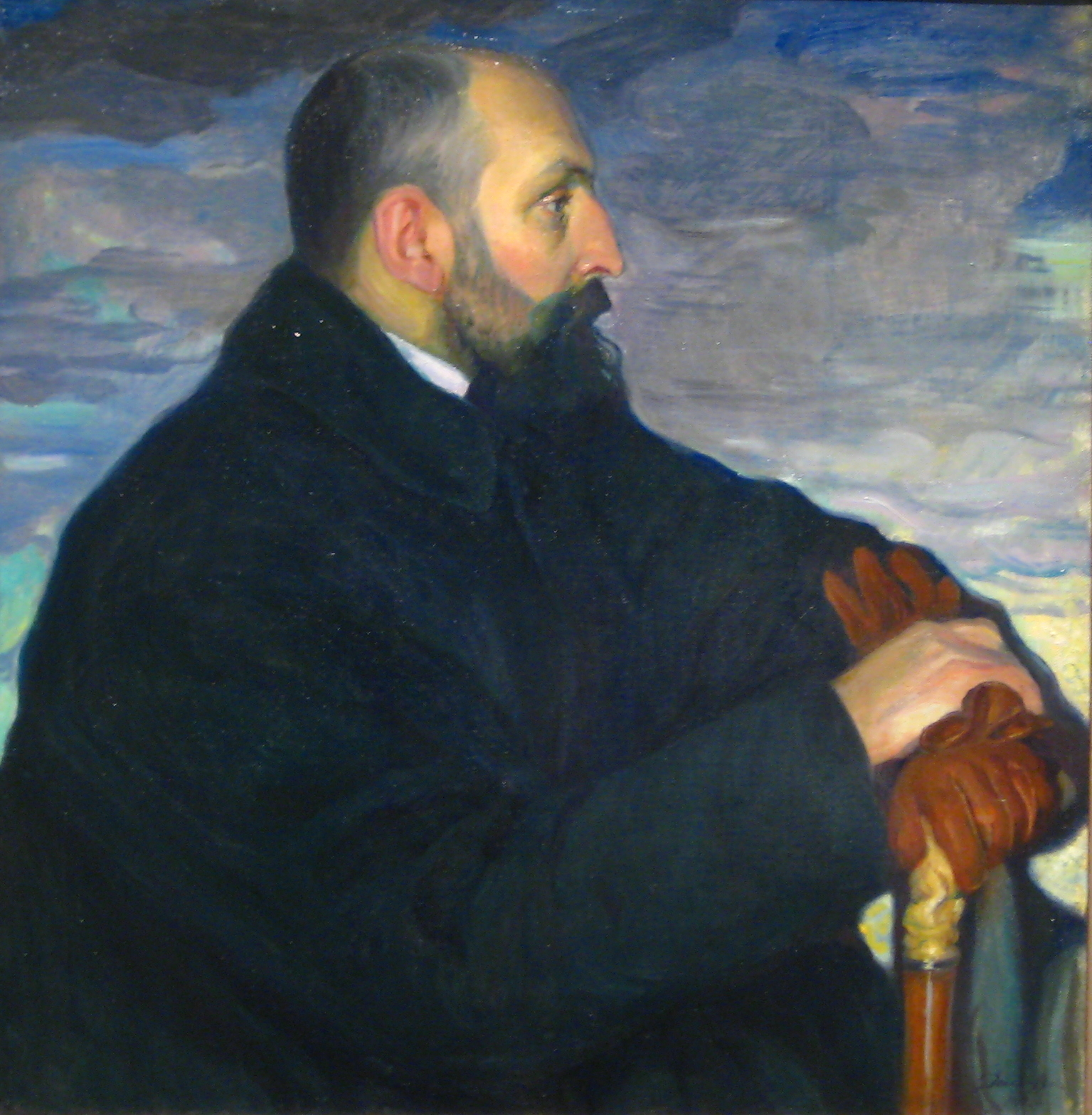
D. Kardovsky, by O. Dell-Vos-Kardovskaya. 1913

Arseny Nikiforovich Semionov was born on 23 January 1911 in the village of Maksimkovo, Polotsk Uyezd, Vitebsk Governorate, Russian Empire in the family of the master-builder of railway bridges. His father died when Arseny was four years old. Semionov spent his childhood in the Belarusian town of Bykhaw. In 1927 Arseny Semionov moved to Leningrad, where he worked as a general worker, while engaging his free time with painting and drawing at the private art studio of Alfred Eberling, an art teacher and member of AKhRR (Association of Artists of Revolutionary Russia). In 1930, Arseny Semionov took preparatory courses at the Academy of Fine Arts and in the same year he became a student of the Institute of Proletarian Fine Art. Semionov university years coincided with significant reforms within the institution and the system of art education in general. Between 1934 and 1937, Semionov worked in the Dmitry Kardovsky studio. Classes taught by Kardovsky and Kardovsky's personality had a great influence on Semionov. In 1937, shortly before graduation from the institute, Semenov became ill and had to pause his education. After his recovery he obtained a certificate verifying completion of five courses at the department of painting without doing graduate work. He was sent to work in the Penza Art College, where in 1938, he accepted membership in the Penza Organization of Soviet Artists.

With onset of Great Patriotic War, Semionov served in the Red Army's armored forces from 1939 to 1944, dispatched in the Trans-Baikal and Mongolia. He took part in the fights for Khalkhin Gol. He rose from private to commander of a tank battalion. He was wounded five times, marked by military awards, including the Order of the Red Star, Order of the Patriotic War the first and second degrees, and by medals. In 1944, Arseny Semionov was discharged on account of his injury.

Semionov taught at the High School of Arts at the Surikov Arts Institute in Moscow from 1944 to 1947. In 1946 Semionov became a member of the Moscow organization of Soviet artists, which allowed him access to participation in Moscow exhibitions. However, the paintings were created after a long break at work, and for the most part remained unfinished. In September 1947 Arseny Semionov returned to Leningrad and received position as a lecturer at the faculty of general painting of the Leningrad Higher School of Industrial Arts named after Vera Mukhina, where he worked for over forty years. In the same 1947 he was accepted as a member of the Leningrad Union of Artists. Since the late 1940s Arseny Semionov participates in exhibitions of Leningrad artists. By 1951 he graduated from Repin Institute of Arts with painting "Motherhood".

Arseny Nikiforovich Semionov died on 13 September 1992 in St Petersburg in the eighty-second year of life. His paintings reside in Art museums and private collections in Russia, Japan, France, in the U.S., England and throughout the world. In 2006 in Saint Petersburg in the Anna Akhmatova Museum hosted an exhibition of works by Arseny Semionov, timed to the publication of the monograph devoted to the life and art of artist.

== Works ==
Throughout his life, Arseny Semionov combined an active teaching career with creative activity. He painted cityscapes and landscapes, still lifes, genre scenes, portraits, and numerous etudes done from the life. He made creative trips to Staraya Ladoga, the Baltic States, Transcarpathia and Crimea. His personal exhibitions took place in Leningrad in 1966, 1977, and in Saint Petersburg in 2006.

Ars. Semionov. In Yalta. 1957

By late 1940s and early 1950s, he tended to a definite number of themes and images. Leningrad motifs and ancient Russian cities dominated his works throughout his life, although the methods of their scenic development changed in the direction of the artificial fixation of transience, the desire to convey the freshness and immediacy of color experience in the work of 1950–1960 years, to the search for more subtle and distributions of colors in the works of the late 1960s and 1970s, more decorative, based on the active use of local color and constructive drawing.

=== Crimea ===
In the 1950s, which can conditionally be attributed to the early period of the artist, Semionov often spend summer time in the Crimea. The themes of his work becomes Yalta and Gurzuf, picturesque corners of the old town and the rest on the seaside promenade. Semionov likes the southern sun and the sonorous brightness of colors. He eagerly seeks to convey on canvas his immediate impressions of the southern nature and life of the street, filled with the sun, contrasts of light and shadows and sporadic movement. The painting In Yalta (1957) is one of the best examples of the work of Semionov of the "Crimean" period. It illustrates the recognizable creative style of the artist of the late 1950s and early 1960s. Much of what was acquired in this early «Crimean» period of his work will be preserved in the individual manner of Semionov as its characteristic and recognizable features. The most interesting examples of the creativity of Semionov of this period can serve the works Crimea Theme (1955), A Little Street in Yalta (1958), A Pier in the Yalta, Embankment in Yalta, Yalta Cargo Port, Yalta Embankment, Yalta. In the Park (all 1959), and others.

=== Leningrad Theme ===
In 1950–1960, the cityscape invariably occupied a prominent place in the work of Semionov. Some of them, such as Spring Day (1959), which depicts the perspective of one of the most beautiful streets of Leningrad, belongs to the best cityscapes created by Arseny Semionov in this genre at the turn of the 1950s and 1960s.

Among the works he created in this genre should be called Spring City Landscape and Spring on the outskirts of Leningrad (both 1956), Narva Gate in Leningrad, Marti Shipyards in Leningrad, On the Neva River Embankment (all 1957), Boat Station at the Fontanka River (1958), Nevsky Prospekt, Flower Market (all 1959), Fontanka River and Factory Motive (both 1960), St Isaac's Square in Leningrad, Okhtinsky Bridge, The University Embankment, At the Kirov Prospekt (all 1961), The Neva River Embankment (1962), Spring on the Neva River (1963), Construction Zanevsky Bridge at the Neva River, The Leningrad. View at the University Embankment, The Leningrad Factory Theme, Alexanrovsky Park in Leningrad (all 1964), Leningrad in Winter (1965), and many others.

=== Old Russian Towns ===
A special impact on the work of Semionov had a trips to the ancient Russian cities Pskov, Staritsa, Izborsk, Torzhok, Suzdal, Staraya Ladoga, Kostroma and work there. Having first discovered Pskov and Staraya Ladoga in the late 1950s, Semionov devoted many years to this topic. As an artist, he was attracted by living history, ancient architecture and a special way of life, organically combined with the surrounding nature. According to his works of this cycle, one can trace how his individual style has changed in 1960s in the direction of enhancing the decorativeness of painting and the sophistication of color. An example of these changes is the painting Old Ladoga (1964), in which the artist convincingly demonstrated a new understanding of color.

Among the works painted by him from the life during numerous trips to ancient Russian cities, are Pskov Cathedral, Pskov. Blue Gate, A Little Bridge in Pskov (all 1958), Landscape with a River, Pskov Ancient Town (both 1960), Old Ladoga. Winter Landscape, Old Ladoga. The Village Council (both 1961), Fisherman moorage in New Ladoga, New Ladoga in Holiday (both 1962), Fisherman's village, Old Ladoga. View at the Volkhov River, Pskov Cremlin (all 1963),Old Ladoga Town (1964), Old Ladoga (1965), St Sophia Cathedral in Novgorod the Great (1966), Suzdal. View of the Kremlin, Suzdal. A Monuments of Architecture (both 1968), Torzhok city (1969), View of Suzdal, View at the Cathedrals in Torzhok, Street in Torzhok (all 1971), and others.

In the 1960s Semionov repeatedly traveled to the Baltic and the Carpathians (Group of Houses in West Ukraine, 1966; West Ukraine landscape with a Road, 1966; West Ukraine Village, 1966), as well as visiting France and Italy. In his paintings appear more subtle and generalized colors. Disappears excessive fragmentation, it replaces the large wholeness and contemplation. Semionov often uses local color. In his painting is enhanced imagery and decorative. In some works of this period discern the influence of Sergei Osipov, a talented painter, with whom Arseny Semionov linked the long-standing friendship, the creative journey, and common pedagogical work at the Department of Painting of the Vera Mukhina Institute.

=== Still-Life ===
In the 1970s Arseny Semionov successfully appealed to a relatively rare for him genre of still life, creating a variety of decorative and fine works of art. Among them are marked at the art shows and in publications Still Life with a Flower (1972), Still Life with antique sculpture (1971), Still Life with Flowers (1975), Still Life with Teapot (1972), Still Life with Jug and Apples (1971) and others.

=== Self-Portrait ===
Arseny Semenov rarely painted portraits. They were mostly images of family: his wife and daughter. Stand out self-portraits the artist painted them in the years of 1950–1960s. These works, in particular, Self-Portrait (1962) and Self-Portrait of 1964, open new facets of the artist's talents, making for a different look at the rest of his work. In a small laconic work Semionov used amazingly accurate means of expression, which allow him with the utmost frankness and depth to say about himself, about his generation and epoch.

In 1966, in Leningrad, there was an exhibition of works by Arseny Semionov dedicated to the 55th anniversary of the artist, and to 20 years of his teaching work at the Department of Painting of the Vera Mukhina Institute. In 1977, in the halls of the Leningrad Union of Artists, there was a joint exhibition of paintings by Arseny Semionov, Sergei Osipov and Cyril Gushchin.

== Principal exhibitions ==
See Principal exhibitions by Arseny Semionov
- 1954 (Leningrad): The Spring Exhibition of works by Leningrad artists of 1954, with Evgenia Antipova, Nikolai Baskakov, Sergei Frolov, Nikolai Galakhov, Vladimir Gorb, Maya Kopitseva, Boris Korneev, Elena Kostenko, Anna Kostrova, Gevork Kotiantz, Valeria Larina, Boris Lavrenko, Ivan Lavsky, Gavriil Malish, Alexei Mozhaev, Nikolai Mukho, Samuil Nevelshtein, Yuri Neprintsev, Sergei Osipov, Lev Russov, Ivan Savenko, Vladimir Seleznev, Arseny Semionov, Alexander Shmidt, Elena Skuin, Victor Teterin, Nikolai Timkov, Mikhail Tkachev, Leonid Tkachenko, Vecheslav Zagonek, and other important Leningrad artists.
- 1955 (Leningrad): The Spring Exhibition of works by Leningrad artists of 1955, with Evgenia Antipova, Irina Baldina, Vladimir Gorb, Alexei Eriomin, Maya Kopitseva, Gevork Kotiantz, Boris Lavrenko, Ivan Lavsky, Dmitry Maevsky, Gavriil Malish, Nikolai Mukho, Lev Orekhov, Sergei Osipov, Lev Russov, Ivan Savenko, Arseny Semionov, Alexander Semionov, Yuri Shablikin, Alexander Shmidt, Elena Skuin, Nikolai Timkov, Leonid Tkachenko, Yuri Tulin, Piotr Vasiliev, Vecheslav Zagonek, Ruben Zakharian, and other important Leningrad artists.
- 1956 (Leningrad): The Fall Exhibition of works by Leningrad artists of 1956, with Piotr Alberti, Taisia Afonina, Vsevolod Bazhenov, Irina Baldina, Nikolai Baskakov, Yuri Belov, Piotr Belousov, Piotr Buchkin, Sergei Frolov, Nikolai Galakhov, Vladimir Gorb, Abram Grushko, Alexei Eriomin, Mikhail Kaneev, Marina Kozlovskaya, Tatiana Kopnina, Maya Kopitseva, Boris Korneev, Alexander Koroviakov, Elena Kostenko, Nikolai Kostrov, Anna Kostrova, Gevork Kotiantz, Yaroslav Krestovsky, Ivan Lavsky, Oleg Lomakin, Dmitry Maevsky, Gavriil Malish, Alexei Mozhaev, Nikolai Mukho, Samuil Nevelshtein, Sergei Osipov, Vladimir Ovchinnikov, Lev Russov, Ivan Savenko, Gleb Savinov, Vladimir Seleznev, Alexander Semionov, Arseny Semionov, Yuri Shablikin, Boris Shamanov, Alexander Shmidt, Nadezhda Shteinmiller, Victor Teterin, Nikolai Timkov, Mikhail Tkachev, Mikhail Trufanov, Yuri Tulin, Piotr Vasiliev, Igor Veselkin, Rostislav Vovkushevsky, Vecheslav Zagonek, Ruben Zakharian, Sergei Zakharov, and other important Leningrad artists.
- 1957 (Leningrad): 1917–1957. Leningrad Artist's works of Art Exhibition, with Evgenia Antipova, Vsevolod Bazhenov, Irina Baldina, Nikolai Baskakov, Piotr Belousov, Piotr Buchkin, Zlata Bizova, Vladimir Chekalov, Sergei Frolov, Nikolai Galakhov, Abram Grushko, Alexei Eriomin, Mikhail Kaneev, Engels Kozlov, Tatiana Kopnina, Maya Kopitseva, Boris Korneev, Alexander Koroviakov, Nikolai Kostrov, Anna Kostrova, Gevork Kotiantz, Yaroslav Krestovsky, Boris Lavrenko, Ivan Lavsky, Oleg Lomakin, Dmitry Maevsky, Gavriil Malish, Alexei Mozhaev, Evsey Moiseenko, Nikolai Mukho, Mikhail Natarevich, Samuil Nevelshtein, Dmitry Oboznenko, Lev Orekhov, Sergei Osipov, Vladimir Ovchinnikov, Nikolai Pozdneev, Alexander Pushnin, Lev Russov, Galina Rumiantseva, Ivan Savenko, Gleb Savinov, Alexander Samokhvalov, Arseny Semionov, Alexander Semionov, Boris Shamanov, Alexander Shmidt, Nadezhda Shteinmiller, Galina Smirnova, Ivan Sorokin, Victor Teterin, Mikhail Tkachev, Leonid Tkachenko, Yuri Tulin, Ivan Varichev, Nina Veselova, Rostislav Vovkushevsky, Anatoli Vasiliev, Lazar Yazgur, Vecheslav Zagonek, Ruben Zakharian, Sergei Zakharov, Maria Zubreeva, and other important Leningrad artists.
- 1958 (Leningrad): The Fall Exhibition of works by Leningrad artists of 1958, with Taisia Afonina, Irina Baldina, Evgenia Baykova, Vsevolod Bazhenov, Piotr Belousov, Yuri Belov, Zlata Bizova, Sergei Frolov, Nikolai Galakhov, Elena Gorokhova, Abram Grushko, Alexei Eriomin, Mikhail Kaneev, Marina Kozlovskaya, Tatiana Kopnina, Boris Korneev, Alexander Koroviakov, Elena Kostenko, Nikolai Kostrov, Anna Kostrova, Gevork Kotiantz, Yaroslav Krestovsky, Valeria Larina, Boris Lavrenko, Ivan Lavsky, Piotr Litvinsky, Oleg Lomakin, Dmitry Maevsky, Gavriil Malish, Alexei Mozhaev, Evsey Moiseenko, Nikolai Mukho, Anatoli Nenartovich, Yuri Neprintsev, Dmitry Oboznenko, Sergei Osipov, Vladimir Ovchinnikov, Nikolai Pozdneev, Alexander Pushnin, Maria Rudnitskaya, Galina Rumiantseva, Lev Russov, Ivan Savenko, Gleb Savinov, Alexander Samokhvalov, Arseny Semionov, Alexander Semionov, Yuri Shablikin, Boris Shamanov, Alexander Shmidt, Nadezhda Shteinmiller, Elena Skuin, Alexander Sokolov, Nikolai Timkov, Yuri Tulin, Ivan Varichev, Anatoli Vasiliev, Piotr Vasiliev, Igor Veselkin, Vecheslav Zagonek, and other important Leningrad artists.
- 1960 (Leningrad): Exhibition of works by Leningrad artists of 1960, with Piotr Alberti, Evgenia Antipova, Taisia Afonina, Genrikh Bagrov, Vsevolod Bazhenov, Nikolai Baskakov, Zlata Bizova, Nikolai Galakhov, Vladimir Gorb, Abram Grushko, Alexei Eriomin, Mikhail Kaneev, Mikhail Kozell, Marina Kozlovskaya, Boris Korneev, Alexander Koroviakov, Elena Kostenko, Nikolai Kostrov, Anna Kostrova, Gevork Kotiantz, Yaroslav Krestovsky, Boris Lavrenko, Ivan Lavsky, Oleg Lomakin, Dmitry Maevsky, Alexei Mozhaev, Evsey Moiseenko, Nikolai Mukho, Andrey Milnikov, Piotr Nazarov, Vera Nazina, Mikhail Natarevich, Samuil Nevelshtein, Dmitry Oboznenko, Sergei Osipov, Nikolai Pozdneev, Maria Rudnitskaya, Vladimir Sakson, Alexander Samokhvalov, Alexander Semionov, Arseny Semionov, Yuri Shablikin, Boris Shamanov, Alexander Shmidt, Elena Skuin, Alexander Sokolov, Alexander Stolbov, Victor Teterin, Nikolai Timkov, Yuri Tulin, Ivan Varichev, Rostislav Vovkushevsky, Vecheslav Zagonek, Ruben Zakharian, and other important Leningrad artists.
- 1960 (Leningrad): Exhibition of works by Leningrad artists of 1960, with Piotr Alberti, Evgenia Antipova, Taisia Afonina, Genrikh Bagrov, Vsevolod Bazhenov, Irina Baldina, Nikolai Baskakov, Yuri Belov, Piotr Belousov, Piotr Buchkin, Zlata Bizova, Vladimir Chekalov, Sergei Frolov, Nikolai Galakhov, Vladimir Gorb, Elena Gorokhova, Abram Grushko, Alexei Eriomin, Mikhail Kaneev, Engels Kozlov, Marina Kozlovskaya, Tatiana Kopnina, Maya Kopitseva, Boris Korneev, Alexander Koroviakov, Elena Kostenko, Nikolai Kostrov, Anna Kostrova, Gevork Kotiantz, Vladimir Krantz, Yaroslav Krestovsky, Valeria Larina, Boris Lavrenko, Ivan Lavsky, Piotr Litvinsky, Oleg Lomakin, Dmitry Maevsky, Gavriil Malish, Nikita Medovikov, Evsey Moiseenko, Nikolai Mukho, Andrey Milnikov, Vera Nazina, Mikhail Natarevich, Anatoli Nenartovich, Samuil Nevelshtein, Dmitry Oboznenko, Vladimir Ovchinnikov, Vecheslav Ovchinnikov, Sergei Osipov, Nikolai Pozdneev, Alexander Pushnin, Lev Russov, Galina Rumiantseva, Maria Rudnitskaya, Ivan Savenko, Vladimir Sakson, Gleb Savinov, Alexander Samokhvalov, Alexander Semionov, Arseny Semionov, Yuri Shablikin, Boris Shamanov, Alexander Shmidt, Nadezhda Shteinmiller, Elena Skuin, Galina Smirnova, Alexander Sokolov, Alexander Stolbov, Victor Teterin, Nikolai Timkov, Mikhail Tkachev, Leonid Tkachenko, Mikhail Trufanov, Yuri Tulin, Ivan Varichev, Anatoli Vasiliev, Valery Vatenin, Nina Veselova, Rostislav Vovkushevsky, Vecheslav Zagonek, Sergei Zakharov, Ruben Zakharian, and other important Leningrad artists.
- 1961 (Leningrad): Exhibition of works by Leningrad artists of 1961, with Piotr Alberti, Evgenia Antipova, Taisia Afonina, Vsevolod Bazhenov, Irina Baldina, Nikolai Baskakov, Yuri Belov, Piotr Belousov, Piotr Buchkin, Zlata Bizova, Nikolai Galakhov, Elena Gorokhova, Abram Grushko, Alexei Eriomin, Mikhail Kaneev, Mikhail Kozell, Engels Kozlov, Marina Kozlovskaya, Maya Kopitseva, Boris Korneev, Elena Kostenko, Anna Kostrova, Gevork Kotiantz, Yaroslav Krestovsky, Valeria Larina, Boris Lavrenko, Ivan Lavsky, Oleg Lomakin, Dmitry Maevsky, Gavriil Malish, Nikita Medovikov, Evsey Moiseenko, Alexei Mozhaev, Nikolai Mukho, Vera Nazina, Mikhail Natarevich, Anatoli Nenartovich, Samuil Nevelshtein, Yuri Neprintsev, Dmitry Oboznenko, Sergei Osipov, Vladimir Ovchinnikov, Nikolai Pozdneev, Alexander Pushnin, Galina Rumiantseva, Lev Russov, Maria Rudnitskaya, Ivan Savenko, Gleb Savinov, Vladimir Sakson, Alexander Samokhvalov, Vladimir Seleznev, Arseny Semionov, Alexander Semionov, Yuri Shablikin, Boris Shamanov, Alexander Shmidt, Nadezhda Shteinmiller, Elena Skuin, Galina Smirnova, Alexander Sokolov, Alexander Stolbov, Victor Teterin, Nikolai Timkov, Leonid Tkachenko, Mikhail Trufanov, Yuri Tulin, Ivan Varichev, Anatoli Vasiliev, Piotr Vasiliev, Valery Vatenin, Lazar Yazgur, Vecheslav Zagonek, Sergei Zakharov, Maria Zubreeva, and other important Leningrad artists.
- 1962 (Leningrad): The Fall Exhibition of works by Leningrad artists of 1962, with Piotr Alberti, Evgenia Antipova, Taisia Afonina, Vsevolod Bazhenov, Nikolai Galakhov, Yuri Belov, Vladimir Gorb, Abram Grushko, Alexei Eremin, Engels Kozlov, Alexander Koroviakov, Boris Lavrenko, Ivan Lavsky, Valeria Larina, Oleg Lomakin, Gavriil Malish, Evsey Moiseenko, Nikolai Mukho, Piotr Nazarov, Vera Nazina, Mikhail Natarevich, Dmitry Oboznenko, Lev Orekhov, Vladimir Ovchinnikov, Sergei Osipov, Nikolai Pozdneev, Galina Rumiantseva, Gleb Savinov, Alexander Semionov, Arseny Semionov, Nadezhda Shteinmiller, Alexander Sokolov, Alexander Stolbov, Alexander Tatarenko, Victor Teterin, Nikolai Timkov, Mikhail Trufanov, Yuri Tulin, Ivan Varichev, Anatoli Vasiliev, Valery Vatenin, Rostislav Vovkushevsky, Vecheslav Zagonek, and other important Leningrad artists.
- 1964 (Leningrad): The Leningrad Fine Arts Exhibition, with Piotr Alberti, Evgenia Antipova, Taisia Afonina, Irina Baldina, Nikolai Baskakov, Evgenia Baykova, Vsevolod Bazhenov, Yuri Belov, Piotr Belousov, Piotr Buchkin, Zlata Bizova, Vladimir Chekalov, Sergei Frolov, Nikolai Galakhov, Vasily Golubev, Tatiana Gorb, Abram Grushko, Alexei Eriomin, Mikhail Kaneev, Yuri Khukhrov, Mikhail Kozell, Marina Kozlovskaya, Tatiana Kopnina, Maya Kopitseva, Boris Korneev, Alexander Koroviakov, Elena Kostenko, Nikolai Kostrov, Anna Kostrova, Gevork Kotiantz, Yaroslav Krestovsky, Valeria Larina, Boris Lavrenko, Ivan Lavsky, Piotr Litvinsky, Oleg Lomakin, Dmitry Maevsky, Gavriil Malish, Evsey Moiseenko, Nikolai Mukho, Piotr Nazarov, Vera Nazina, Mikhail Natarevich, Anatoli Nenartovich, Yuri Neprintsev, Dmitry Oboznenko, Sergei Osipov, Vladimir Ovchinnikov, Nikolai Pozdneev, Alexander Pushnin, Galina Rumiantseva, Ivan Savenko, Gleb Savinov, Vladimir Sakson, Alexander Samokhvalov, Vladimir Seleznev, Arseny Semionov, Alexander Semionov, Yuri Shablikin, Boris Shamanov, Alexander Shmidt, Nadezhda Shteinmiller, Elena Skuin, Galina Smirnova, Alexander Sokolov, Ivan Sorokin, Victor Teterin, Nikolai Timkov, Mikhail Tkachev, Mikhail Trufanov, Yuri Tulin, Vitaly Tulenev, Ivan Varichev, Anatoli Vasiliev, Piotr Vasiliev, Valery Vatenin, Lazar Yazgur, Vecheslav Zagonek, Sergei Zakharov, Ruben Zakharian, and other important Leningrad artists.
- 1965 (Leningrad): The Spring Exhibition of works by Leningrad artists of 1965, with Piotr Alberti, Evgenia Antipova, Taisia Afonina, Vsevolod Bazhenov, Yuri Belov, Vladimir Gavrilov, Irina Getmanskaya, Vasily Golubev, Irina Dobrekova, Maya Kopitseva, Alexander Koroviakov, Mikhail Kozell, Engels Kozlov, Elena Kostenko, Gevork Kotiantz, Vladimir Krantz, Valeria Larina, Boris Lavrenko, Ivan Lavsky, Oleg Lomakin, Dmitry Maevsky, Gavriil Malish, Valentina Monakhova, Nikolai Mukho, Vera Nazina, Mikhail Natarevich, Anatoli Nenartovich, Dmitry Oboznenko, Sergei Osipov, Lev Orekhov, Victor Otiev, Nikolai Pozdneev, Maria Rudnitskaya, Ivan Savenko, Vladimir Sakson, Alexander Semionov, Arseny Semionov, Boris Shamanov, Alexander Shmidt, Nadezhda Shteinmiller, Elena Skuin, Alexander Stolbov, Victor Teterin, Nikolai Timkov, Yuri Tulin, Vitaly Tulenev, Ivan Varichev, Anatoli Vasiliev, Igor Veselkin, Rostislav Vovkushevsky, Lazar Yazgur, Vecheslav Zagonek, Ruben Zakharian, and other important Leningrad artists.
- 1968 (Leningrad): The Fall Exhibition of works by Leningrad artists of 1968, with Piotr Alberti, Vsevolod Bazhenov, Sergei Frolov, Nikolai Galakhov, Tatiana Gorb, Vladimir Gorb, Mikhail Kaneev, Mikhail Kozell, Engels Kozlov, Elena Kostenko, Nikolai Kostrov, Anna Kostrova, Gevork Kotiantz, Vladimir Krantz, Ivan Lavsky, Dmitry Maevsky, Gavriil Malish, Nikolai Mukho, Mikhail Natarevich, Sergei Osipov, Vladimir Ovchinnikov, Lev Orekhov, Victor Otiev, Maria Rudnitskaya, Ivan Savenko, Vladimir Sakson, Alexander Semionov, Arseny Semionov, Boris Shamanov, Alexander Shmidt, Elena Skuin, Alexander Stolbov, German Tatarinov, Mikhail Trufanov, Yuri Tulin, Ivan Varichev, Anatoli Vasiliev, Rostislav Vovkushevsky, Lazar Yazgur, Vecheslav Zagonek, Sergei Zakharov, Ruben Zakharian, and other important Leningrad artists.
- 1972 (Leningrad): Our Contemporary The Second Exhibition of works by Leningrad artists of 1972, with Irina Baldina, Nikolai Baskakov, Piotr Belousov, Nikolai Galakhov, Irina Getmanskaya, Tatiana Gorb, Irina Dobrekova, Alexei Eriomin, Engels Kozlov, Maya Kopitseva, Boris Korneev, Elena Kostenko, Nikolai Kostrov, Anna Kostrova, Gevork Kotiantz, Boris Lavrenko, Oleg Lomakin, Dmitry Maevsky, Vera Nazina, Samuil Nevelshtein, Dmitry Oboznenko, Sergei Osipov, Kapitolina Rumiantseva, Ivan Savenko, Vladimir Sakson, Arseny Semionov, Alexander Shmidt, Nikolai Timkov, Anatoli Vasiliev, Vecheslav Zagonek, and other important Leningrad artists.
- 1972 (Leningrad): Across the Motherland Exhibition of Leningrad artists dedicated to 50th Anniversary of USSR, with Evgenia Antipova, Nikolai Baskakov, Olga Bogaevskaya, Sergei Frolov, Nikolai Galakhov, Vasily Golubev, Tatiana Gorb, Vladimir Gorb, Irina Dobrekova, Mikhail Kaneev, Mikhail Kozell, Marina Kozlovskaya, Engels Kozlov, Maya Kopitseva, Boris Korneev, Elena Kostenko, Nikolai Kostrov, Anna Kostrova, Gevork Kotiantz, Yaroslav Krestovsky, Ivan Lavsky, Oleg Lomakin, Dmitry Maevsky, Gavriil Malish, Evsey Moiseenko, Piotr Nazarov, Samuil Nevelshtein, Dmitry Oboznenko, Sergei Osipov, Nikolai Pozdneev, Ivan Savenko, Gleb Savinov, Vladimir Sakson, Arseny Semionov, Alexander Sokolov, German Tatarinov, Victor Teterin, Nikolai Timkov, Mikhail Trufanov, Yuri Tulin, Vitaly Tulenev, Ivan Varichev, Igor Veselkin, Valery Vatenin, Vecheslav Zagonek, and other important Leningrad artists.
- 1975 (Leningrad): Our Contemporary regional exhibition of Leningrad artists of 1975, with Evgenia Antipova, Taisia Afonina, Vsevolod Bazhenov, Irina Baldina, Nikolai Baskakov, Piotr Belousov, Veniamin Borisov, Zlata Bizova, Nikolai Galakhov, Vasily Golubev, Elena Gorokhova, Abram Grushko, Irina Dobrekova, Alexei Eriomin, Mikhail Kaneev, Yuri Khukhrov, Mikhail Kozell, Marina Kozlovskaya, Engels Kozlov, Maya Kopitseva, Boris Korneev, Elena Kostenko, Nikolai Kostrov, Anna Kostrova, Gevork Kotiantz, Vladimir Krantz, Yaroslav Krestovsky, Boris Lavrenko, Oleg Lomakin, Dmitry Maevsky, Gavriil Malish, Evsey Moiseenko, Piotr Nazarov, Vera Nazina, Mikhail Natarevich, Yuri Neprintsev, Samuil Nevelshtein, Dmitry Oboznenko, Sergei Osipov, Vladimir Ovchinnikov, Nikolai Pozdneev, Alexander Pushnin, Galina Rumiantseva, Kapitolina Rumiantseva, Ivan Savenko, Gleb Savinov, Vladimir Sakson, Alexander Samokhvalov, Arseny Semionov, Alexander Semionov, Yuri Shablikin, Boris Shamanov, Alexander Shmidt, Nadezhda Shteinmiller, Elena Skuin, Galina Smirnova, Alexander Stolbov, Victor Teterin, Nikolai Timkov, Leonid Tkachenko, Mikhail Trufanov, Yuri Tulin, Vitaly Tulenev, Ivan Varichev, Anatoli Vasiliev, Igor Veselkin, Valery Vatenin, Lazar Yazgur, Vecheslav Zagonek, and other important Leningrad artists.
- 1976 (Moscow): The Fine Arts of Leningrad, with Mikhail Avilov, Evgenia Antipova, Nathan Altman, Irina Baldina, Nikolai Baskakov, Yuri Belov, Piotr Belousov, Isaak Brodsky, Piotr Buchkin, Rudolf Frentz, Nikolai Galakhov, Vasily Golubev, Abram Grushko, Alexei Eriomin, Mikhail Kaneev, Engels Kozlov, Marina Kozlovskaya, Maya Kopitseva, Boris Korneev, Elena Kostenko, Nikolai Kostrov, Anna Kostrova, Gevork Kotiantz, Boris Lavrenko, Oleg Lomakin, Alexander Lubimov, Dmitry Maevsky, Gavriil Malish, Evsey Moiseenko, Mikhail Natarevich, Vera Nazina, Yuri Neprintsev, Samuil Nevelshtein, Dmitry Oboznenko, Sergei Osipov, Vladimir Ovchinnikov, Nikolai Pozdneev, Alexander Pushnin, Victor Oreshnikov, Ivan Savenko, Vladimir Sakson, Gleb Savinov, Alexander Samokhvalov, Vladimir Seleznev, Alexander Semionov, Arseny Semionov, Boris Shamanov, Nadezhda Shteinmiller, Elena Skuin, Galina Smirnova, Alexander Sokolov, Victor Teterin, Nikolai Timkov, Mikhail Trufanov, Yuri Tulin, Ivan Varichev, Anatoli Vasiliev, Valery Vatenin, Nina Veselova, Vecheslav Zagonek, Sergei Zakharov, and other important Leningrad artists.
- 1977 (Leningrad): Exhibition of works by Arseny Semionov, Sergei Osipov, and Kirill A. Guschin.
- 1994 (Pont-Audemer): Dessins, Gravures, Sculptures et Tableaux du XX siecle du fonds de L' Union des Artistes de Saint-Petersbourg, with Abram Grushko, Vasily Golubev, Elena Kostenko, Maya Kopitseva, Gevork Kotiantz, Marina Kozlovskaya, Valeria Larina, Boris Lavrenko, Valentina Monakhova, Mikhail Natarevich, Ivan Savenko, Vladimir Sakson, Arseny Semionov, Alexander Shmidt, Elena Skuin, Nikolai Timkov, Yuri Tulin, Vitaly Tulenev, Ivan Varichev, Igor Veselkin, and other important Leningrad artists.
- 2006 (Saint Petersburg): Exhibition of works by Arseny Semionov in Anna Akhmatova Memorial Museum.

== See also ==
- Fine Art of Leningrad
- Leningrad School of Painting
- List of Russian artists
- List of 20th-century Russian painters
- List of painters of Saint Petersburg Union of Artists
- List of the Russian Landscape painters
- Saint Petersburg Union of Artists
