= Nadezhda Shteinmiller =

Russian artist (1915–1991)

Nadezhda Pavlovna Shteinmiller
- Born: 16 February 1915; Petrograd, Russian Empire
- Died: 11 November 1991 (aged 76); Leningrad, USSR
- Education: Repin Institute of Arts
- Known for: Painting, graphics, scenography
- Movement: Realism

Nadezhda Pavlovna Shteinmiller (Russian: Наде́жда Па́вловна Штейнми́ллер; 16 February 1915 – 11 November 1991) was a Russian Soviet realist painter, graphic artist, art teacher, scenographer, and stage designer who lived and worked in Leningrad. She was a member of the Leningrad Union of Artists, regarded as one of the leading representatives of the Leningrad School of Painting.

== Biography ==
Nadezhda Pavlovna Shteinmiller was born on 16 February 1915 in Petrograd, Russian Empire.

In 1937, Nadezhda Shteinmiller entered at the first course of the Leningrad Institute of Painting, Sculpture and Architecture. There she studied under Boris Fogel, Mikhail Bernshtein, Alexander Zaytsev, and Igor Grabar.

In 1946, Nadezhda Shteinmiller graduated from the Leningrad Institute of Painting, Sculpture and Architecture named after Ilya Repin as stage designer in Mikhail Bobishov workshop. Her graduated work was design the play by E. Rostand's "Cyrano de Bergerac."

Since 1947, Nadezhda Shteinmiller has participated in Art Exhibitions. She painted portraits, cityscapes, still lifes, landscapes, genre paintings, sketches for the theatre costumes and set-scenes. She worked in watercolor, oil and tempera paintings. A talented colorist, mastered techniques of plein air painting.

The beauty of color and fundamental composition attached to her works soft poetic sounds, raising levels of everyday scenes to complete and profound image. Development of a picturesque manners went in the direction of strengthening decorative qualities of painting.

Since 1946, Nadezhda Shteinmiller was a member of the Leningrad Union of Artists. In years of 1940-1960s, Nadezhda Shteinmiller taught drawings and painting in the Leningrad's Higher School of Art and Industry (since 1953 named after Vera Mukhina).

Nadezhda Pavlovna Shteinmiller died on 11 November 1991 in Leningrad. Her paintings reside in museums and private collections in Russia, Germany, France, England, the U.S., Italy and others.

== See also ==
- Leningrad School of Painting
- List of 20th-century Russian painters
- List of painters of Saint Petersburg Union of Artists
- Saint Petersburg Union of Artists

== Principal exhibitions ==
Principal Exhibitions by Nadezhda Shteinmiller
- 1951 (Leningrad): Exhibition of works by Leningrad artists of 1951, with Piotr Alberti, Vsevolod Bazhenov, Piotr Belousov, Piotr Buchkin, Rudolf Frentz, Nikolai Galakhov, Vladimir Gorb, Tatiana Kopnina, Alexander Lubimov, Evsey Moiseenko, Mikhail Natarevich, Yuri Neprintsev, Vladimir Ovchinnikov, Sergei Osipov, Alexander Pushnin, Ivan Savenko, Gleb Savinov, Alexander Samokhvalov, Vladimir Seleznev, Alexander Shmidt, Nadezhda Shteinmiller, Nikolai Timkov, Leonid Tkachenko, Mikhail Tkachev, Yuri Tulin, Igor Veselkin, Rostislav Vovkushevsky, Vecheslav Zagonek, and other important Leningrad artists.
- 1956 (Leningrad): The Fall Exhibition of works by Leningrad artists of 1956, with Piotr Alberti, Taisia Afonina, Vsevolod Bazhenov, Irina Baldina, Nikolai Baskakov, Yuri Belov, Piotr Belousov, Piotr Buchkin, Sergei Frolov, Nikolai Galakhov, Vladimir Gorb, Abram Grushko, Alexei Eriomin, Mikhail Kaneev, Marina Kozlovskaya, Tatiana Kopnina, Maya Kopitseva, Boris Korneev, Alexander Koroviakov, Elena Kostenko, Nikolai Kostrov, Anna Kostrova, Gevork Kotiantz, Yaroslav Krestovsky, Ivan Lavsky, Oleg Lomakin, Dmitry Maevsky, Gavriil Malish, Alexei Mozhaev, Nikolai Mukho, Samuil Nevelshtein, Sergei Osipov, Vladimir Ovchinnikov, Lev Russov, Ivan Savenko, Gleb Savinov, Vladimir Seleznev, Alexander Semionov, Arseny Semionov, Yuri Shablikin, Boris Shamanov, Alexander Shmidt, Nadezhda Shteinmiller, Victor Teterin, Nikolai Timkov, Mikhail Tkachev, Mikhail Trufanov, Yuri Tulin, Rostislav Vovkushevsky, Vecheslav Zagonek, Ruben Zakharian, Sergei Zakharov, and other important Leningrad artists.
- 1957 (Leningrad): 1917 – 1957. Leningrad Artist's works of Art Exhibition, with Evgenia Antipova, Vsevolod Bazhenov, Irina Baldina, Nikolai Baskakov, Piotr Belousov, Piotr Buchkin, Zlata Bizova, Vladimir Chekalov, Sergei Frolov, Nikolai Galakhov, Abram Grushko, Alexei Eriomin, Mikhail Kaneev, Engels Kozlov, Tatiana Kopnina, Maya Kopitseva, Boris Korneev, Alexander Koroviakov, Nikolai Kostrov, Anna Kostrova, Gevork Kotiantz, Yaroslav Krestovsky, Boris Lavrenko, Ivan Lavsky, Oleg Lomakin, Dmitry Maevsky, Gavriil Malish, Alexei Mozhaev, Evsey Moiseenko, Nikolai Mukho, Mikhail Natarevich, Samuil Nevelshtein, Dmitry Oboznenko, Lev Orekhov, Sergei Osipov, Vladimir Ovchinnikov, Nikolai Pozdneev, Alexander Pushnin, Lev Russov, Galina Rumiantseva, Ivan Savenko, Gleb Savinov, Alexander Samokhvalov, Arseny Semionov, Alexander Mikhailovich Semionov, Boris Shamanov, Alexander Shmidt, Nadezhda Shteinmiller, Galina Smirnova, Ivan Sorokin, Victor Teterin, Mikhail Tkachev, Leonid Tkachenko, Yuri Tulin, Ivan Varichev, Nina Veselova, Rostislav Vovkushevsky, Anatoli Vasiliev, Vecheslav Zagonek, Ruben Zakharian, Sergei Zakharov, Maria Zubreeva, and other important Leningrad artists.
- 1957 (Moscow): All-Union Art Exhibition of 1957 dedicated to the 40th Anniversary of October Revolution, with Vsevolod Bazhenov, Nikolai Baskakov, Irina Baldina, Piotr Belousov, Piotr Buchkin, Zlata Bizova, Nikolai Galakhov, Elena Gorokhova, Alexei Eriomin, Engels Kozlov, Maya Kopitseva, Boris Korneev, Boris Lavrenko, Oleg Lomakin, Nikita Medovikov, Evsey Moiseenko, Mikhail Natarevich, Samuil Nevelshtein, Yuri Neprintsev, Dmitry Oboznenko, Vladimir Ovchinnikov, Nikolai Pozdneev, Alexander Pushnin, Ivan Savenko, Gleb Savinov, Alexander Samokhvalov, Alexander Semionov, Nadezhda Shteinmiller, Victor Teterin, Nikolai Timkov, Mikhail Trufanov, Yuri Tulin, Ivan Varichev, Piotr Vasiliev, Nina Veselova, Sergei Zakharov, Maria Zubreeba, and other important Leningrad artists.
- 1958 (Leningrad): The Fall Exhibition of works by Leningrad artists of 1958, with Taisia Afonina, Piotr Belousov, Vsevolod Bazhenov, Irina Baldina, Yuri Belov, Bizova Zlata, Sergei Frolov, Nikolai Galakhov, Elena Gorokhova, Abram Grushko, Alexei Eriomin, Mikhail Kaneev, Marina Kozlovskaya, Tatiana Kopnina, Boris Korneev, Alexander Koroviakov, Elena Kostenko, Nikolai Kostrov, Anna Kostrova, Gevork Kotiantz, Yaroslav Krestovsky, Boris Lavrenko, Ivan Lavsky, Oleg Lomakin, Dmitry Maevsky, Gavriil Malish, Alexei Mozhaev, Evsey Moiseenko, Nikolai Mukho, Anatoli Nenartovich, Yuri Neprintsev, Dmitry Oboznenko, Sergei Osipov, Vladimir Ovchinnikov, Nikolai Pozdneev, Alexander Pushnin, Galina Rumiantseva, Lev Russov, Ivan Savenko, Gleb Savinov, Alexander Samokhvalov, Arseny Semionov, Alexander Semionov, Yuri Shablikin, Boris Shamanov, Alexander Shmidt, Nadezhda Shteinmiller, Elena Skuin, Nikolai Timkov, Yuri Tulin, Ivan Varichev, Anatoli Vasiliev, Igor Veselkin, Vecheslav Zagonek, and other important Leningrad artists.
- 1960 (Leningrad): Exhibition of works by Leningrad artists of 1960, with Piotr Alberti, Evgenia Antipova, Taisia Afonina, Genrikh Bagrov, Vsevolod Bazhenov, Irina Baldina, Nikolai Baskakov, Yuri Belov, Piotr Buchkin, Zlata Bizova, Vladimir Chekalov, Nikolai Galakhov, Vladimir Gorb, Elena Gorokhova, Abram Grushko, Alexei Eriomin, Mikhail Kaneev, Engels Kozlov, Marina Kozlovskaya, Tatiana Kopnina, Maya Kopitseva, Boris Korneev, Alexander Koroviakov, Elena Kostenko, Nikolai Kostrov, Anna Kostrova, Gevork Kotiantz, Yaroslav Krestovsky, Valeria Larina, Boris Lavrenko, Ivan Lavsky, Oleg Lomakin, Dmitry Maevsky, Gavriil Malish, Nikita Medovikov, Evsey Moiseenko, Nikolai Mukho, Andrey Milnikov, Vera Nazina, Mikhail Natarevich, Anatoli Nenartovich, Samuil Nevelshtein, Dmitry Oboznenko, Vladimir Ovchinnikov, Vecheslav Ovchinnikov, Sergei Osipov, Nikolai Pozdneev, Alexander Pushnin, Lev Russov, Galina Rumiantseva, Maria Rudnitskaya, Ivan Savenko, Vladimir Sakson, Gleb Savinov, Alexander Samokhvalov, Alexander Semionov, Arseny Semionov, Yuri Shablikin, Boris Shamanov, Alexander Shmidt, Nadezhda Shteinmiller, Elena Skuin, Galina Smirnova, Alexander Sokolov, Alexander Stolbov, Victor Teterin, Nikolai Timkov, Mikhail Tkachev, Leonid Tkachenko, Mikhail Trufanov, Yuri Tulin, Ivan Varichev, Anatoli Vasiliev, Valery Vatenin, Rostislav Vovkushevsky, Vecheslav Zagonek, Sergei Zakharov, Ruben Zakharian, and other important Leningrad artists.
- 1961 (Leningrad): Exhibition of works by Leningrad artists of 1961, with Piotr Alberti, Evgenia Antipova, Taisia Afonina, Vsevolod Bazhenov, Irina Baldina, Nikolai Baskakov, Yuri Belov, Piotr Buchkin, Zlata Bizova, Nikolai Galakhov, Elena Gorokhova, Abram Grushko, Alexei Eriomin, Mikhail Kaneev, Mikhail Kozell, Engels Kozlov, Marina Kozlovskaya, Maya Kopitseva, Boris Korneev, Elena Kostenko, Gevork Kotiantz, Yaroslav Krestovsky, Valeria Larina, Boris Lavrenko, Ivan Lavsky, Oleg Lomakin, Dmitry Maevsky, Gavriil Malish, Nikita Medovikov, Evsey Moiseenko, Alexei Mozhaev, Nikolai Mukho, Vera Nazina, Mikhail Natarevich, Anatoli Nenartovich, Samuil Nevelshtein, Yuri Neprintsev, Dmitry Oboznenko, Sergei Osipov, Vladimir Ovchinnikov, Nikolai Pozdneev, Alexander Pushnin, Galina Rumiantseva, Lev Russov, Maria Rudnitskaya, Ivan Savenko, Gleb Savinov, Vladimir Sakson, Alexander Samokhvalov, Vladimir Seleznev, Arseny Semionov, Alexander Semionov, Yuri Shablikin, Boris Shamanov, Alexander Shmidt, Nadezhda Shteinmiller, Elena Skuin, Smirnova Galina, Alexander Sokolov, Alexander Stolbov, Victor Teterin, Nikolai Timkov, Leonid Tkachenko, Mikhail Trufanov, Yuri Tulin, Ivan Varichev, Anatoli Vasiliev, Piotr Vasiliev, Valery Vatenin, Leonid Yazgur, Vecheslav Zagonek, Sergei Zakharov, Maria Zubreeva, and other important Leningrad artists.
- 1962 (Leningrad): The Fall Exhibition of works by Leningrad artists of 1962, with Piotr Alberti, Evgenia Antipova, Taisia Afonina, Vsevolod Bazhenov, Ivan Varichev, Valery Vatenin, Rostislav Vovkushevsky, Nikolai Galakhov, Vladimir Gorb, Abram Grushko, Alexei Eremin, Boris Lavrenko, Ivan Lavsky, Valeria Larina, Oleg Lomakin, Gavriil Malish, Evsey Moiseenko, Nikolai Mukho, Piotr Nazarov, Vera Nazina, Mikhail Natarevich, Dmitry Oboznenko, Lev Orekhov, Vladimir Ovchinnikov, Sergei Osipov, Nikolai Pozdneev, Galina Rumiantseva, Gleb Savinov, Alexander Semionov, Arseny Semionov, Nadezhda Shteinmiller, Alexander Tatarenko, Victor Teterin, Nikolai Timkov, Mikhail Trufanov, Yuri Tulin, and other important Leningrad artists.
- 1964 (Leningrad): The Leningrad Fine Arts Exhibition, with Piotr Alberti, Evgenia Antipova, Taisia Afonina, Vsevolod Bazhenov, Irina Baldina, Nikolai Baskakov, Yuri Belov, Piotr Buchkin, Zlata Bizova, Vladimir Chekalov, Nikolai Galakhov, Vasily Golubev, Tatiana Gorb, Abram Grushko, Alexei Eriomin, Mikhail Kaneev, Mikhail Kozell, Marina Kozlovskaya, Tatiana Kopnina, Maya Kopitseva, Boris Korneev, Alexander Koroviakov, Elena Kostenko, Gevork Kotiantz, Yaroslav Krestovsky, Valeria Larina, Boris Lavrenko, Ivan Lavsky, Piotr Litvinsky, Oleg Lomakin, Dmitry Maevsky, Gavriil Malish, Evsey Moiseenko, Nikolai Mukho, Piotr Nazarov, Vera Nazina, Mikhail Natarevich, Anatoli Nenartovich, Yuri Neprintsev, Dmitry Oboznenko, Sergei Osipov, Vladimir Ovchinnikov, Nikolai Pozdneev, Alexander Pushnin, Galina Rumiantseva, Ivan Savenko, Gleb Savinov, Vladimir Sakson, Alexander Samokhvalov, Vladimir Seleznev, Arseny Semionov, Alexander Semionov, Yuri Shablikin, Boris Shamanov, Alexander Shmidt, Nadezhda Shteinmiller, Elena Skuin, Smirnova Galina, Alexander Sokolov, Ivan Sorokin, Victor Teterin, Nikolai Timkov, Mikhail Tkachev, Mikhail Trufanov, Yuri Tulin, Vitaly Tulenev, Ivan Varichev, Anatoli Vasiliev, Piotr Vasiliev, Valery Vatenin, Leonid Yazgur, Vecheslav Zagonek, Sergei Zakharov, Ruben Zakharian, and other important Leningrad artists.
- 1975 (Leningrad): Our Contemporary regional exhibition of Leningrad artists of 1975, with Evgenia Antipova, Taisia Afonina, Vsevolod Bazhenov, Irina Baldina, Nikolai Baskakov, Piotr Belousov, Veniamin Borisov, Zlata Bizova, Nikolai Galakhov, Vasily Golubev, Elena Gorokhova, Abram Grushko, Irina Dobrekova, Alexei Eriomin, Mikhail Kaneev, Yuri Khukhrov, Mikhail Kozell, Marina Kozlovskaya, Engels Kozlov, Maya Kopitseva, Boris Korneev, Elena Kostenko, Gevork Kotiantz, Vladimir Krantz, Yaroslav Krestovsky, Boris Lavrenko, Oleg Lomakin, Dmitry Maevsky, Gavriil Malish, Evsey Moiseenko, Piotr Nazarov, Vera Nazina, Mikhail Natarevich, Yuri Neprintsev, Samuil Nevelshtein, Dmitry Oboznenko, Sergei Osipov, Vladimir Ovchinnikov, Nikolai Pozdneev, Alexander Pushnin, Galina Rumiantseva, Ivan Savenko, Gleb Savinov, Vladimir Sakson, Alexander Samokhvalov, Arseny Semionov, Alexander Semionov, Yuri Shablikin, Boris Shamanov, Alexander Shmidt, Nadezhda Shteinmiller, Elena Skuin, Galina Smirnova, Alexander Stolbov, Victor Teterin, Nikolai Timkov, Leonid Tkachenko, Mikhail Trufanov, Yuri Tulin, Vitaly Tulenev, Ivan Varichev, Anatoli Vasiliev, Igor Veselkin, Valery Vatenin, Leonid Yazgur, Vecheslav Zagonek, and other important Leningrad artists.
- 1976 (Moscow): The Fine Arts of Leningrad, with Mikhail Avilov, Evgenia Antipova, Nathan Altman, Irina Baldina, Nikolai Baskakov, Yuri Belov, Piotr Belousov, Isaak Brodsky, Piotr Buchkin, Rudolf Frentz, Nikolai Galakhov, Vasily Golubev, Abram Grushko, Alexsei Eriomin, Sergei Zakharov, Mikhail Kaneev, Engels Kozlov, Marina Kozlovskaya, Maya Kopitseva, Boris Korneev, Elena Kostenko, Gevork Kotiantz, Boris Lavrenko, Oleg Lomakin, Dmitry Maevsky, Gavriil Malish, Evsey Moiseenko, Mikhail Natarevich, Vera Nazina, Yuri Neprintsev, Samuil Nevelshtein, Dmitry Oboznenko, Sergei Osipov, Vladimir Ovchinnikov, Nikolai Pozdneev, Alexander Pushnin, Victor Oreshnikov, Ivan Savenko, Vladimir Sakson, Gleb Savinov, Alexander Samokhvalov, Vladimir Seleznev, Alexander Semionov, Arseny Semionov, Boris Shamanov, Nadezhda Shteinmiller, Elena Skuin, Victor Teterin, Nikolai Timkov, Mikhail Trufanov, Yuri Tulin, Ivan Varichev, Vecheslav Zagonek, and other important Leningrad artists.
- 1994 (Saint Petersburg): The Leningrad Artists. Paintings of 1950-1980s, with Piotr Alberti, Taisia Afonina, Vsevolod Bazhenov, Piotr Buchkin, Irina Baldina, Veniamin Borisov, Yuri Belov, Piotr Belousov, Vladimir Chekalov, Nikolai Galakhov, Irina Dobrekova, Alexei Eriomin, Mikhail Kaneev, Yuri Khukhrov, Mikhail Kozell, Maya Kopitseva, Marina Kozlovskaya, Boris Korneev, Alexander Koroviakov, Elena Kostenko, Piotr Litvinsky, Boris Lavrenko, Dmitry Maevsky, Alexei Mozhaev, Valentina Monakhova, Mikhail Natarevich, Alexander Naumov, Anatoli Nenartovich, Yuri Neprintsev, Samuil Nevelshtein, Dmitry Oboznenko, Lev Orekhov, Sergei Osipov, Vladimir Ovchinnikov, Victor Otiev, Nikolai Pozdneev, Evgeny Pozdniakov, Lev Russov, Galina Rumiantseva, Kapitolina Rumiantseva, Alexander Samokhvalov, Alexander Semionov, Nadezhda Shteinmiller, German Tatarinov, Nikolai Timkov, Mikhail Tkachev, Leonid Tkachenko, Anatoli Vasiliev, Leonid Yazgur, Vecheslav Zagonek, and other important Leningrad artists.
- 1994 (Saint Petersburg): Painting from the life by Leningrad artists, with Piotr Alberti, Taisia Afonina, Evgenia Antipova, Vsevolod Bazhenov, Irina Baldina, Veniamin Borisov, Zlata Bizova, Vladimir Chekalov, Nikolai Galakhov, Tatiana Gorb, Abram Grushko, Irina Dobrekova, Alexei Eriomin, Mikhail Kaneev, Yuri Khukhrov, Mikhail Kozell, Maya Kopitseva, Marina Kozlovskaya, Boris Korneev, Alexander Koroviakov, Elena Kostenko, Piotr Litvinsky, Boris Lavrenko, Ivan Lavsky, Dmitry Maevsky, Alexei Mozhaev, Valentina Monakhova, Nikolai Mukho, Mikhail Natarevich, Alexander Naumov, Anatoli Nenartovich, Dmitry Oboznenko, Lev Orekhov, Sergei Osipov, Vladimir Ovchinnikov, Victor Otiev, Nikolai Pozdneev, Evgeny Pozdniakov, Galina Rumiantseva, Kapitolina Rumiantseva, Lev Russov, Alexander Samokhvalov, Alexander Semionov, Nadezhda Shteinmiller, German Tatarinov, Nikolai Timkov, Mikhail Tkachev, Leonid Tkachenko, Anatoli Vasiliev, Igor Veselkin, Leonid Yazgur, Vecheslav Zagonek, Ruben Zakharian, and other important Leningrad artists.
- 1995 (Saint Petersburg): The Lyrics in the works of artists of the war generation, with Piotr Alberti, Taisia Afonina, Evgenia Antipova, Vsevolod Bazhenov, Irina Baldina, Veniamin Borisov, Yuri Belov, Piotr Belousov, Piotr Buchkin, Nikolai Galakhov, Abram Grushko, Mikhail Kaneev, Yuri Khukhrov, Mikhail Kozell, Maya Kopitseva, Marina Kozlovskaya, Boris Korneev, Alexander Koroviakov, Elena Kostenko, Dmitry Maevsky, Gavriil Malish, Nikolai Mukho, Mikhail Natarevich, Anatoli Nenartovich, Yuri Neprintsev, Samuil Nevelshtein, Sergei Osipov, Vladimir Ovchinnikov, Victor Otiev, Nikolai Pozdneev, Evgeny Pozdniakov, Lev Russov, Galina Rumiantseva, Kapitolina Rumiantseva, Alexander Samokhvalov, Alexander Semionov, Alexander Shmidt, Nadezhda Shteinmiller, Alexander Tatarenko, German Tatarinov, Victor Teterin, Nikolai Timkov, Mikhail Tkachev, Leonid Tkachenko, Anatoli Vasiliev, Igor Veselkin, Rostislav Vovkushevsky, and other important Leningrad artists.
- 1996 (Saint Petersburg): Paintings of 1940-1990s. The Leningrad School, with Piotr Alberti, Taisia Afonina, Vsevolod Bazhenov, Irina Baldina, Veniamin Borisov, Vladimir Chekalov, Evgeny Chuprun, Nikolai Galakhov, Tatiana Gorb, Abram Grushko, Alexei Eriomin, Mikhail Kaneev, Mikhail Kozell, Maya Kopitseva, Marina Kozlovskaya, Alexander Koroviakov, Vladimir Krantz, Boris Lavrenko, Ivan Lavsky, Piotr Litvinsky, Dmitry Maevsky, Valentina Monakhova, Mikhail Natarevich, Anatoli Nenartovich, Samuil Nevelshtein, Lev Orekhov, Sergei Osipov, Vladimir Ovchinnikov, Victor Otiev, Nikolai Pozdneev, Evgeny Pozdniakov, Lev Russov, Galina Rumiantseva, Kapitolina Rumiantseva, Alexander Samokhvalov, Alexander Semionov, Nadezhda Shteinmiller, German Tatarinov, Nikolai Timkov, Mikhail Tkachev, Leonid Tkachenko, Anatoli Vasiliev, Igor Veselkin, Rostislav Vovkushevsky, Ruben Zakharian, and other important Leningrad artists.

== Bibliography ==
- Exhibition of works by Leningrad artists of 1951. Exhibition catalogue. – Leningrad: Lenizdat, 1951. – p. 22.
- The Fall Exhibition of works by Leningrad artists of 1956. Catalogue. – Leningrad: Leningrad artist, 1958. – p. 68.
- 1917 – 1957. Exhibition of works by Leningrad artists. Catalogue. – Leningrad: Khudozhnik RSFSR, 1958. – p. 86.
- All-Union Art Exhibition of 1957 dedicated to the 40th Anniversary of October Revolution. Catalogue. – Moscow: Soviet artist, 1957. – p. 258.
- The Fall Exhibition of works by Leningrad artists of 1958. Catalogue. – Leningrad: Khudozhnik RSFSR, 1959. – p. 50.
- Exhibition of works by Leningrad artists of 1960. Exhibition catalogue. – Leningrad: Khudozhnik RSFSR, 1961. – p. 46.
- Soviet Russia republic exhibition of 1960. Exhibition catalogue. – Moscow: Ministry of culture of Russian Federation, 1960. – p. 93.
- Exhibition of works by Leningrad artists of 1961. Exhibition catalogue. – Leningrad: Khudozhnik RSFSR, 1964. – p. 44.
- Autumn Exhibition of works by Leningrad artists of 1962. Exhibition Catalogue. – Leningrad: : Khudozhnik RSFSR, 1962. – p. 28.
- The Leningrad Fine Arts Exhibition. – Leningrad: Khudozhnik RSFSR, 1965. – pp. 62, 142.
- Art works by Russian Federation Artists grants to Museums and Culture Institutions (1963–1971). Official Catalogue. – Moscow: Russian Federation Union of Artists, 1972. – p. 128.
- Our Contemporary regional exhibition of Leningrad artists of 1975. Catalogue. – Leningrad: Khudozhnik RSFSR, 1980. – p. 66.
- The Fine Arts of Leningrad. Exhibition catalogue. – Leningrad: Khudozhnik RSFSR, 1976. – p. 261.
- Directory of members of the Union of Artists of USSR. Volume 2. – Moscow: Soviet artist, 1979. – p. 603.
- Exhibitions of the Soviet art. Directory. Volume 5. 1954 – 1958. – Moscow: Soviet Artist, 1981. – pp. 24, 122, 260, 379, 384, 387, 549, 571.
- Directory of members of the Leningrad branch of Union of Artists of Russian Federation.- Leningrad: Khudozhnik RSFSR, 1987. – p. 149.
- Painting from the life by Leningrad artists. Exhibition catalogue. – Saint Petersburg: Nikolai Nekrasov Memorial museum, 1994. – p. 6.
- The Lyrics in the works of artists of the war generation. Painting, drawings. Exhibition catalogue. – Saint Petersburg: Nikolai Nekrasov Memorial museum, 1995. – p. 6.
- Sergei V. Ivanov. Unknown Socialist Realism. The Leningrad School. – Saint Petersburg: NP-Print Edition, 2007. – pp. 9, 27, 249, 297, 307, 373, 387, 389, 391–395, 404, 405, 413–417, 422, 423. ISBN 5-901724-21-6, ISBN 978-5-901724-21-7.
- Anniversary Directory graduates of Saint Petersburg State Academic Institute of Painting, Sculpture, and Architecture named after Ilya Repin, Russian Academy of Arts. 1915 – 2005. – Saint Petersburg: Pervotsvet Publishing House, 2007. p. 57. ISBN 978-5-903677-01-6.
