= Saint Petersburg Union of Artists =

Russian union of artists

- Санкт-Петербургский Союз художников
- Formation: 2 August 1932
- Type: Non-profit organization
- Location: Saint Petersburg, Russia
- Website: www.spbsh.ru

Union of Artists of Saint Petersburg (Russian: Санкт-Петербургский Союз художников) was established on August 2, 1932, as a creative union of the Leningrad artists and arts critics. Prior to 1959, it was called "Leningrad Union of Soviet Artists". From 1959 (when it joined the Union of Artists of the RSFSR), it was called as Leningrad branch of Union of Artists of Russian Federation. After the renaming of the city in 1991, it became known as the Saint Petersburg Union of Artists.

== Members ==
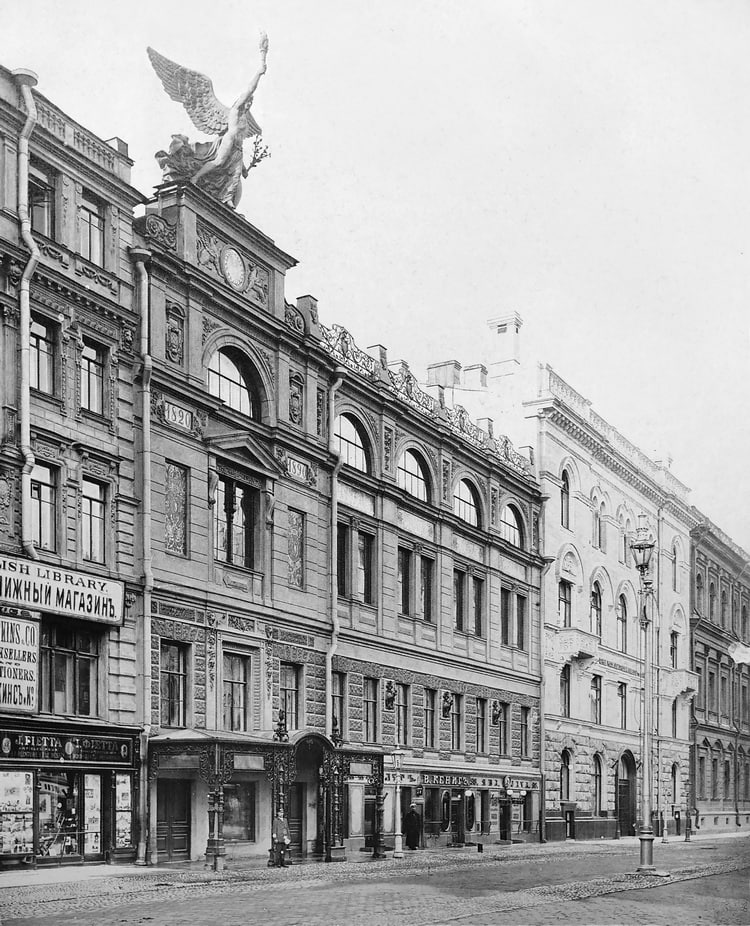
House of the Union of Artists on Bolshaya Morskaya in 1912, when it housed the Imperial Society for the Encouragement of the Arts

Members of Union of Artists of Saint Petersburg in different years were Mikhail Avilov, Nathan Altman, Mikhail Anikushin, Piotr Alberti, Evgenia Antipova, Taisia Afonina, Vsevolod Bazhenov, Irina Baldina, Nikolai Baskakov, Evgenia Baykova, Piotr Belousov, Yuri Belov, Ivan Bilibin, Veniamin Borisov, Boris F. Borzin, Isaak Brodsky, Piotr Buchkin, Vladimir Chekalov, Evgeny Chuprun, Natalia Dik, Rudolf Frentz, Sergei Frolov, Nikolai Galakhov, Irina Getmanskaya, Vasily Golubev, Vladimir Gorb, Tatiana Gorb, Abram Grushko, Irina Dobrekova, Alexei Eriomin, Mikhail Kaneev, Yuri Khukhrov, Boris Korneev, Georgy Kovenchuk, Engels Kozlov, Mikhail Kozell, Tatiana Kopnina, Maya Kopitseva, Elena Kostenko, Nikolai Kostrov, Anna Kostrova, Gevork Kotiantz, Vladimir Krantz, Alexander Laktionov, Valeria Larina, Boris Lavrenko, Ivan Lavsky, Oleg Lomakin, Vladimir Lebedev, Alexander Lubimov, Kasimir Malevich, Dmitry Maevsky, Gavriil Malish, Valentina Monakhova, Nikolai Mukho, Alexander Matveev, Dmitry Mitrokhin, Evsey Moiseenko, Mikhail Natarevich, Piotr Nazarov, Anatoli Nenartovich, Samuil Nevelshtein, Yuri Neprintsev, Dmitry Oboznenko, Vladimir Ovchinnikov, Sergei Osipov, Alexander Osmerkin, Lev Orekhov, Victor Otiev, Anna Ostroumova-Lebedeva, Alexey Parygin, Nikolai Pozdneev, Kuzma Petrov-Vodkin, Nikolay Punin, Maria Rudnitskaya, Galina Rumiantseva, Kapitolina Rumiantseva, Lev Russov, Arcady Rylov, Ivan Savenko, Vladimir Sakson, Alexander Samokhvalov, Alexander Savinov, Vladimir Seleznev, Arseny Semionov, Alexander Semionov, Gleb Savinov, Elena Skuin, Galina Smirnova, Yuri Shablikin, Boris Shamanov, Alexander Shmidt, Nadezhda Shteinmiller, Alexander Sokolov, Alexander Stolbov, Alexander Tatarenko, Victor Teterin, German Tatarinov, Nikolai Timkov, Leonid Tkachenko, Mikhail Tkachev, Yuri Tulin, Vitaly Tulenev, Pavel Filonov, Boris Ugarov, Ivan Varichev, Anatoli Vasiliev, Piotr Vasiliev, Valery Vatenin, Nina Veselova, Igor Veselkin, Rostislav Vovkushevsky, Lazar Yazgur, Vecheslav Zagonek, Sergei Zakharov, Ruben Zakharian, Maria Zubreeva, and many other eminent masters.

== Structure ==
Union of Artists of Saint Petersburg comprises 11 creative sections. There are sections: painting, drawing, sculpture, ceramics, arts and crafts, theater and cinema, monumental art, poster, critics and art history, photography, restoration. As of January 1, 2010, the Union included 3,500 members.

== Chairmen ==
Saint Petersburg Union has consistently led by the following artists:

- Petrov-Vodkin Kuzma Sergeevich (1932–1937),
- Manizer Matvey Genrikhovich (1937–1941),
- Serov Vladimir Alexandrovich (1941–1948),
- Nikolaev Yaroslav Sergeevich (1948–1951),
- Sokolov Vasily Vasilievich (1951–1953),
- Kosov Grigory Vasilievich (1953–1953),
- Serebriany Joseph Alexandrovich (1954–1957),
- Sokolov Vasily Vasilievich (1957–1962),
- Anikushin Mikhail Konstantinovich (1962–1972),
- Fomin Piotr Timofeevich (1972–1975),
- Ugarov Boris Sergeevich (1975–1979),
- Lokhovinin Yuri Nikolayevich (1975–1986),
- Anikushin Mikhail Konstantinovich (1986–1990),
- Maltsev Evgene Demyanovich (1990–1997),
- Charkin Albert Serafimovich (1997—2017),
- Saykov, Alexander Vasilyevich (2017—2018),
- Bazanov, Andrey Nikolaevich (since 2018).

== See also ==
- Fine Art of Leningrad
- List of painters of Saint Petersburg Union of Artists
- List of Russian artists
- List of 20th-century Russian painters
- List of the Russian Landscape painters

== Gallery ==
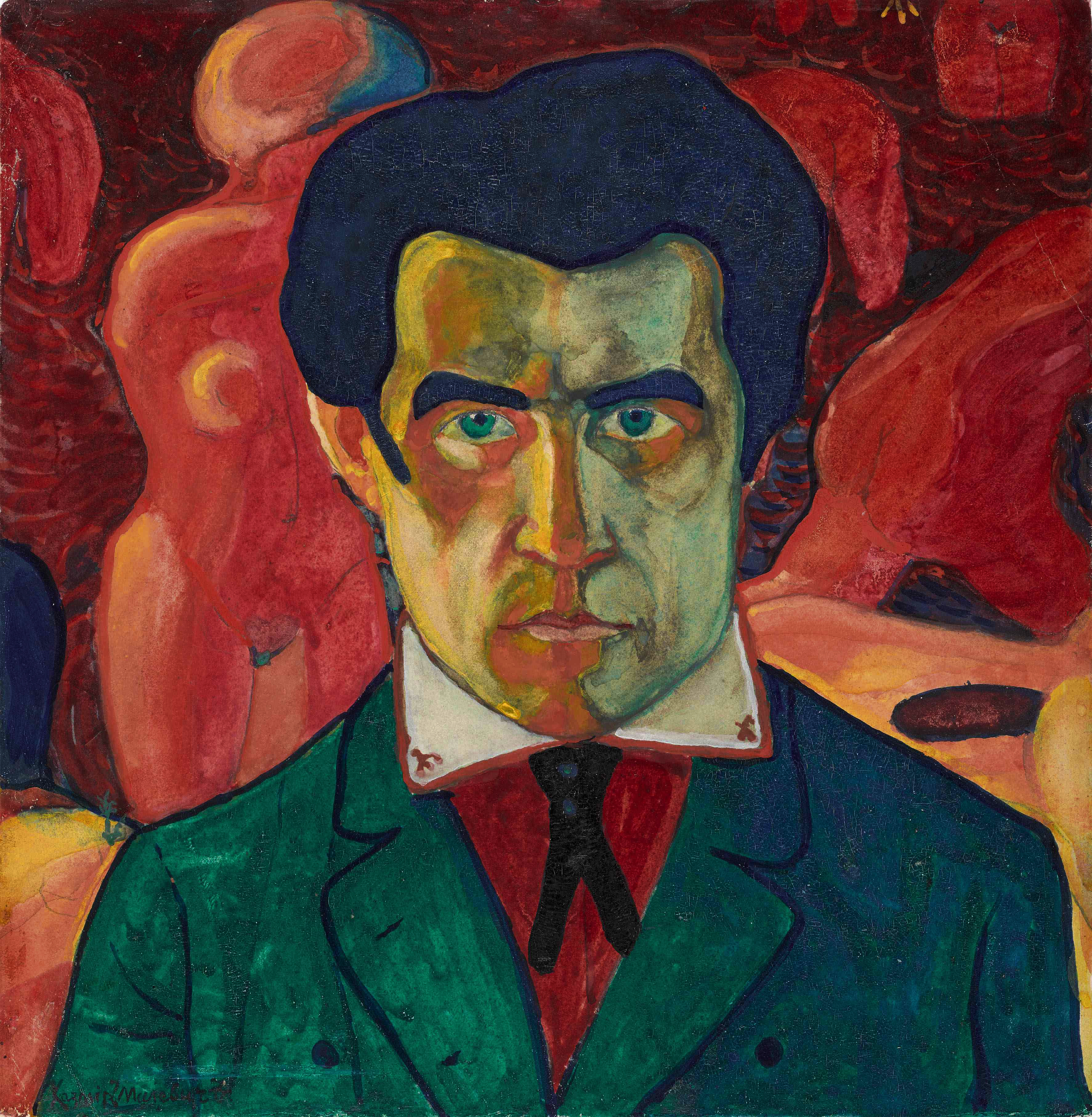
K. Malevich. Selfportrait. 1911

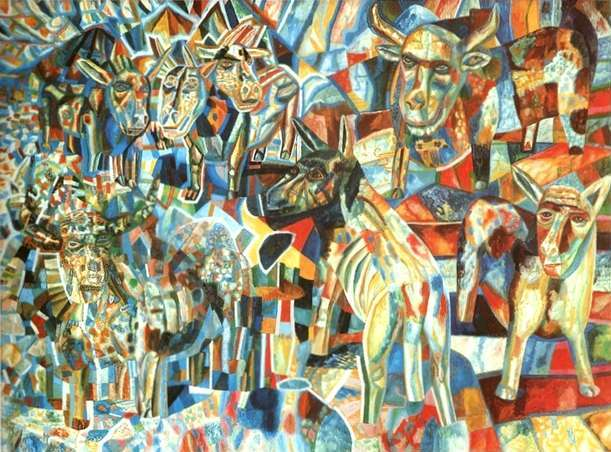
P. Filonov. Animals. 1930

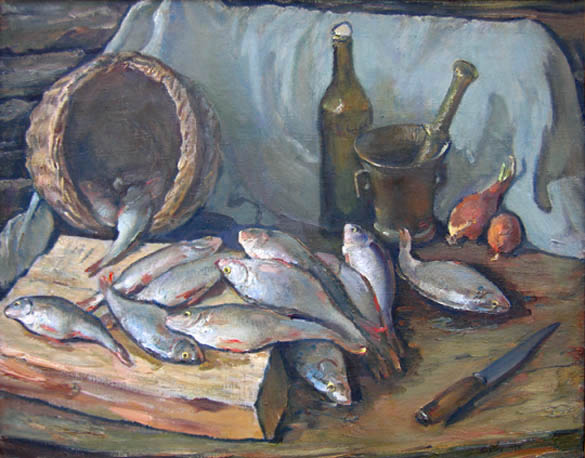
B. F. Borzin. Fish and Basket, 1978

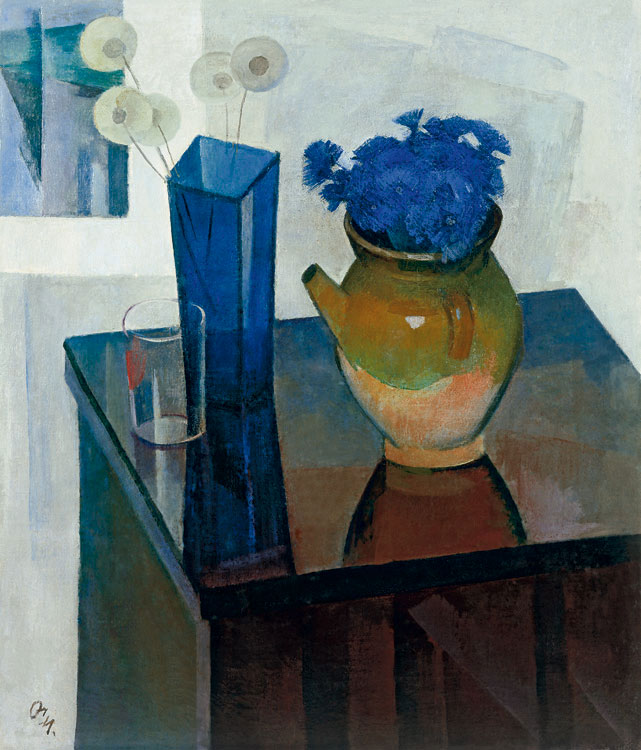
S. Osipov. Cornflowers. 1976

== Sources ==
- Художники народов СССР. Биобиблиографический словарь. Т. 1.. — М: Искусство, 1970.
- Художники народов СССР. Биобиблиографический словарь. Т. 2. — М: Искусство, 1972.
- Directory of members of the Union of Artists of USSR. Volume 1,2. - Moscow: Soviet artist, 1979.
- Художники народов СССР. Биобиблиографический словарь. Т. 4. Кн. 1. — М: Искусство, 1983.
- Directory of members of the Leningrad branch of Union of Artists of Russian Federation. - Leningrad: Khudozhnik RSFSR, 1987.
- Художники народов СССР. Биобиблиографический словарь. Т. 4. Кн. 2. — Санкт-Петербург: Гуманитарное агентство Академический проект, 1995.
- Matthew C. Bown. Dictionary of 20th Century Russian and Soviet Painters 1900-1980s. - London: Izomar, 1998. ISBN 0-9532061-0-6, ISBN 978-0-9532061-0-0.
- Sergei V. Ivanov. Unknown Socialist Realism. The Leningrad School.- Saint Petersburg: NP-Print Edition, 2007. – ISBN 5-901724-21-6, ISBN 978-5-901724-21-7.
- Anniversary Directory graduates of Saint Petersburg State Academic Institute of Painting, Sculpture, and Architecture named after Ilya Repin, Russian Academy of Arts. 1915 - 2005. - Saint Petersburg: Pervotsvet Publishing House, 2007.
