= Boris Fedorovich Borzin =

Soviet realism painter (1923–1991)

Boris F. Borzin
- Борис Ф. Борзин
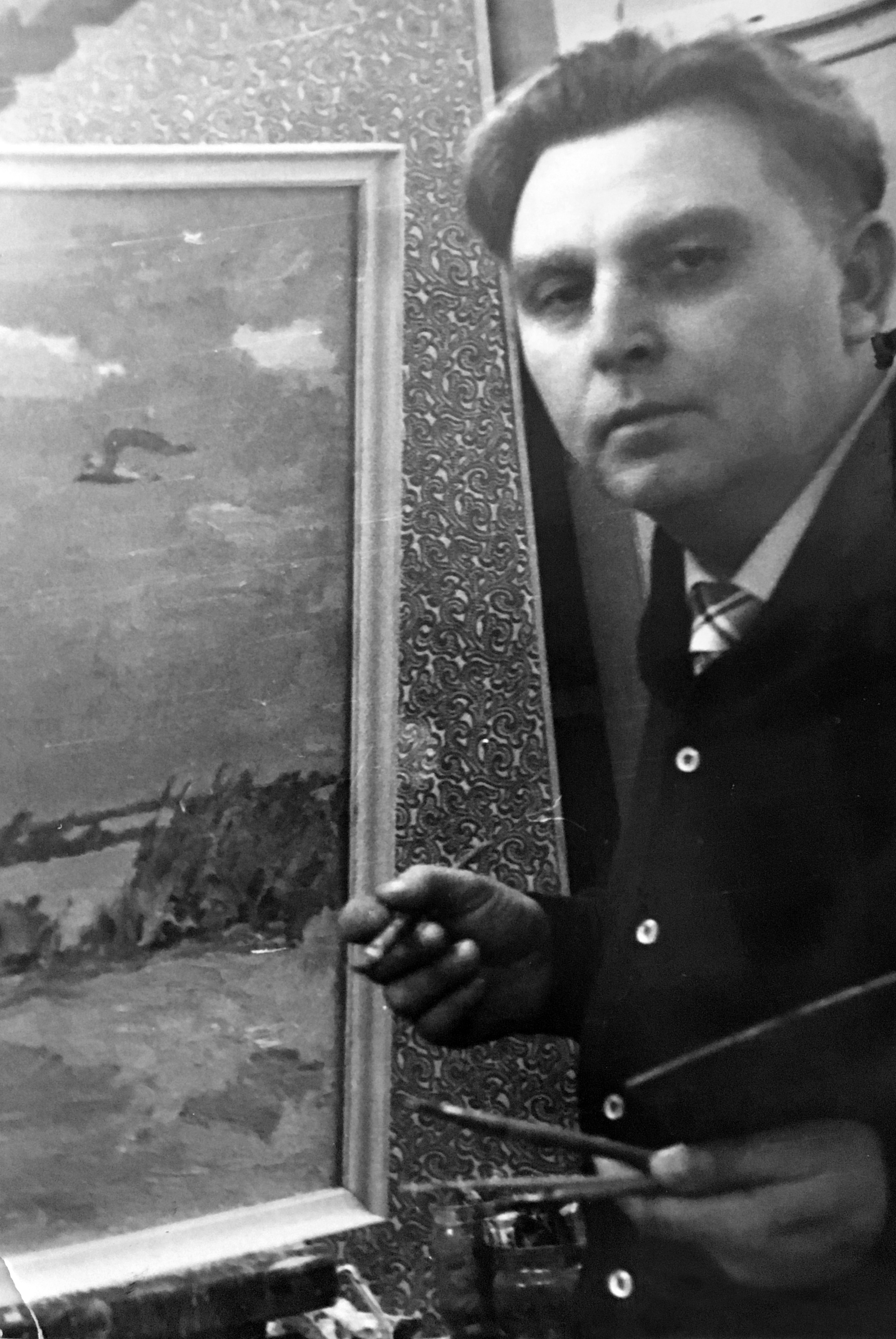
- Born: 29 December 1923; Russian SFSR (modern-day Ukraine)
- Died: 1991 (aged 67–68); Saint Petersburg, Russian Federation
- Known for: Fine artist; educator; historian; conservator
- Movement: Socialist Realism
- Awards: Silver medal of the Academy of Artists of USSR; Order of the Red Star; Order of the Patriotic War; Medal "For the Defence of Stalingrad"; Medal "For the Victory over Germany in the Great Patriotic War 1941–1945"; Medal "For Courage" (Russia)

Boris Fedorovich Borzin (other spellings: Borsin, Borzine; Russian: Борис Фёдорович Борзин; 29 December 1923 – 1991) was a Ukrainian-born Soviet realist painter, graphic artist, conservator, art historian, author, and a tenured professor of fine art for 30 years at the Herzen State Pedagogical University of Russia (formerly Leningrad State Pedagogical Institute). Borzin was also a veteran of the Great Patriotic War.

== Biography ==
Boris F. Borzin was a graduate of the Lithuanian State Art Institute. His post-graduate work was done at the department of higher education at the Moscow State Stroganov Academy of Design and Applied Arts and the Russian Academy of Arts in Saint Petersburg, Russia.

Boris was a member of the Saint Petersburg Union of Artists, taking part in more than sixty art exhibitions in St. Petersburg, Moscow, and elsewhere. Many of his works are owned by private collectors and art galleries, and were acquired by Fine Arts Foundation of the Russian Federation and later by the Russian State Museum in St. Petersburg as well as other state museums. He participated in and helped organize yearly exhibitions of Veterans of the Great Patriotic War, and exhibited in almost all of the Exhibitions of Leningrad Artists, Our Contemporary exhibitions, and showings of the works "Russian Landscape" and "50 years of Soviet Power" among others. Throughout his artistic career, Borzin always remained true to the traditions of Soviet realism and the Leningrad School of Artists. His main genres were landscape, portrait, and still-life.

A large number of his works were donated to and acquired by Russian museums and Russian State Art foundations. Some of his works are in permanent collections in the Tretyakov Gallery ("Self Portrait"), State Russian Museum (oil painting "Window. Poplar branch.", two graphic portraits, and eight portrait drawings) and the Museum of the History of St. Petersburg (three landscape oil paintings), the Benois Family Museum (landscape oil painting), the Yelagin Palace Museum (landscape oil painting), and others.

Borzin served in the Second World War from 1941 until 1945 and was awarded seven metals. Throughout his life he painted many war genre paintings, such as his well-known triptych "Leningrad - Boundaries of Glory", displayed in the October exhibition of Leningrad Artists (now owned by Museum of the Defense and Siege of Leningrad), and his graphic portraits of veterans that were exhibited at the "30 years after Victory in the Great Patriotic War Exhibition" (acquired by the Russian State Arts Foundation).

After the war, Borzin led a team of restorers and conservators in the restoration of murals and ceiling paintings of a number of historic landmarks in St. Petersburg and its surroundings, most notably the Hermitage Museum, the Summer Palace, Yelagin Palace, Saint Isaac's Cathedral, and Monplaisir Palace. He wrote a book on the subject entitled Decorative Art in Time of Peter The Great and for his work was awarded the Silver Medal of the Academy of Arts of USSR. He also wrote several publications on the topic of artistic education, art history, and preservation of art.

In 1991, two posthumous exhibitions of Borzin's paintings and graphic works took place in St. Petersburg in Rossi Pavilion of the Summer Gardens and in the Benois Family Museum in Peterhoff. In 1992 a large personal exhibition of Boris's works was opened in Yelagin Palace in St. Petersburg; his drawings of famous chess players were exhibited at the Chess Club of Chigorin Memorial; and in spring, the St. Petersburg Philharmonic Hall displayed his graphic portraits of famous musicians sketched during the concerts.

== Awards and Medals ==
- Order of the Red Star
- Order of the Patriotic War, 2nd Class, twice
- Medal Order of Glory
- Medal "for Courage" (Russia)
- Medal "for the defense of Stalingrad"
- Medal "For the Victory over Germany in the Great Patriotic War 1941–1945"
- Medal "For Contribution to the History of Russian Art"

== Gallery ==
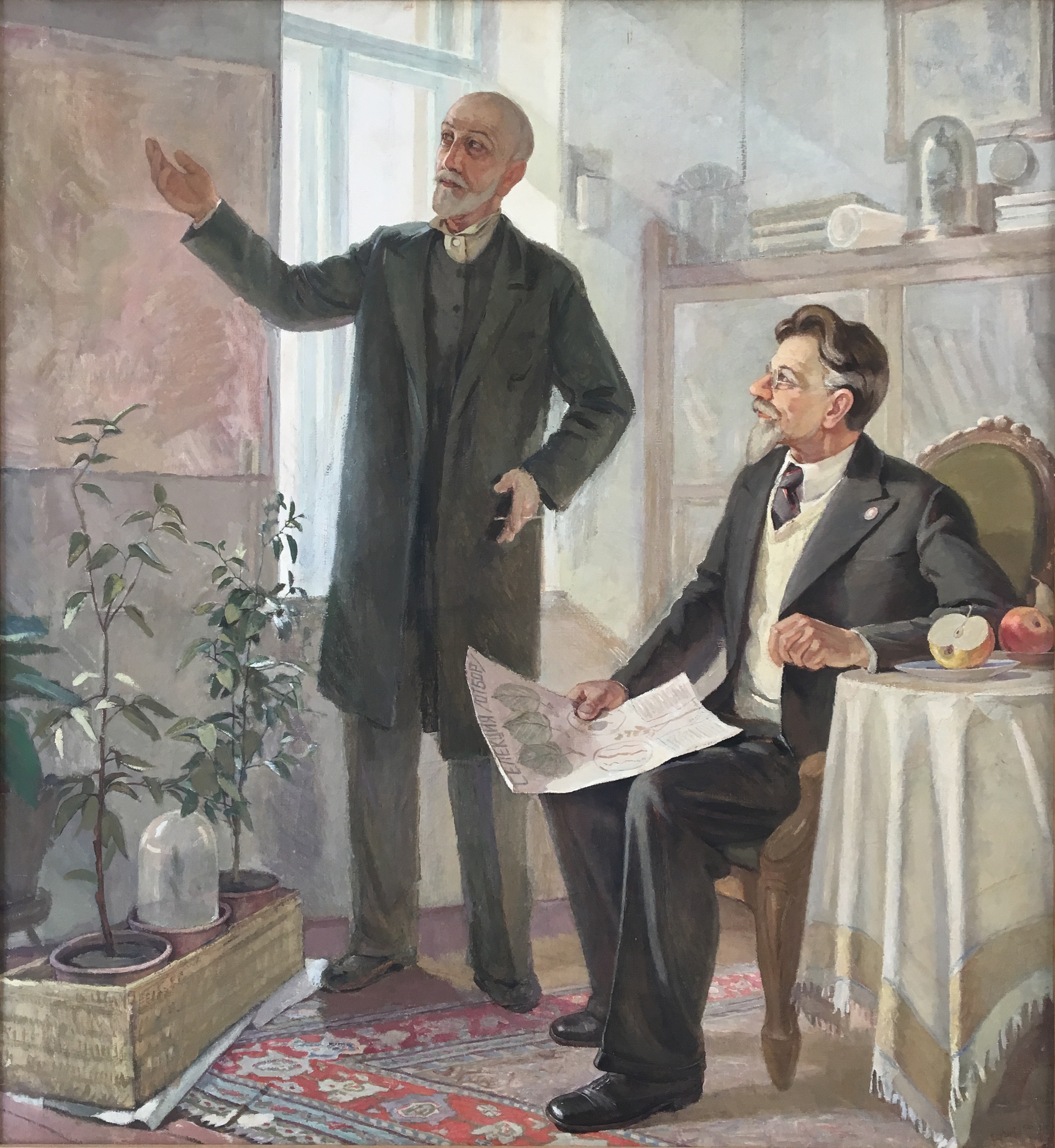
"Professors in their studio" oil on canvas

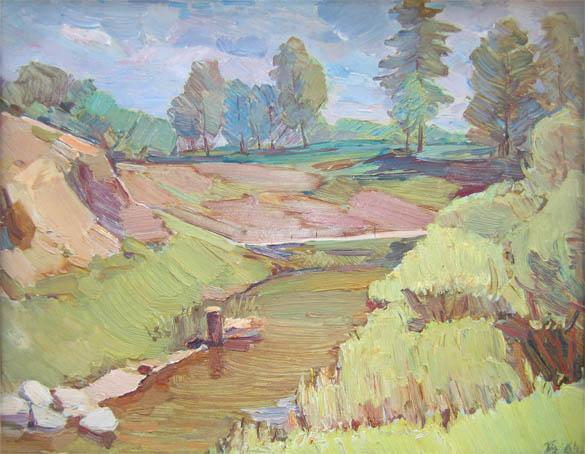
"Creek" oil on board

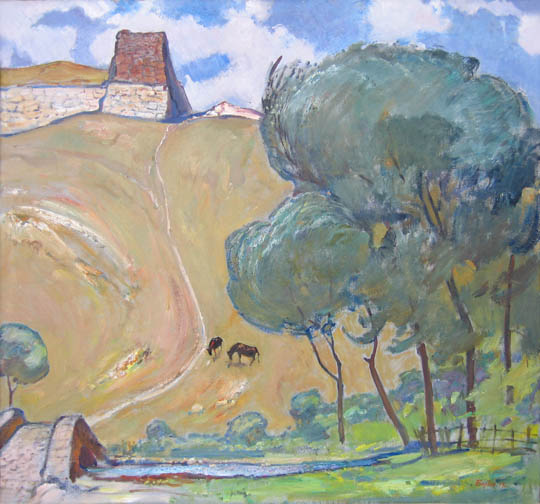
oil on canvas

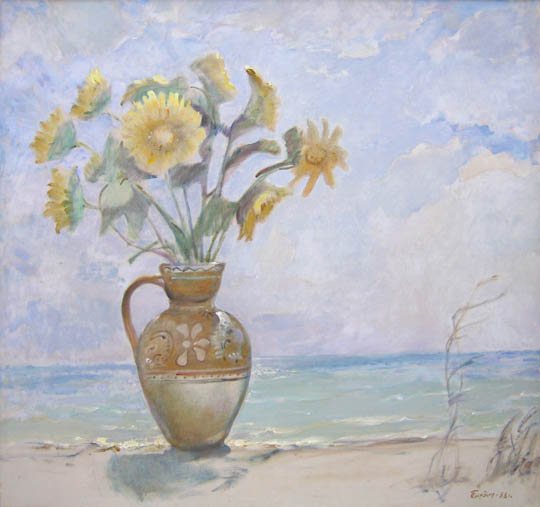
"Sunflowers on the beach" - oil on canvas

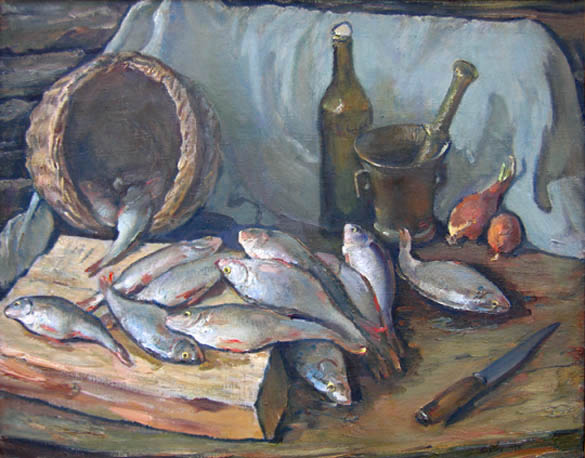
"Still-life Catch of the day" - oil on canvas

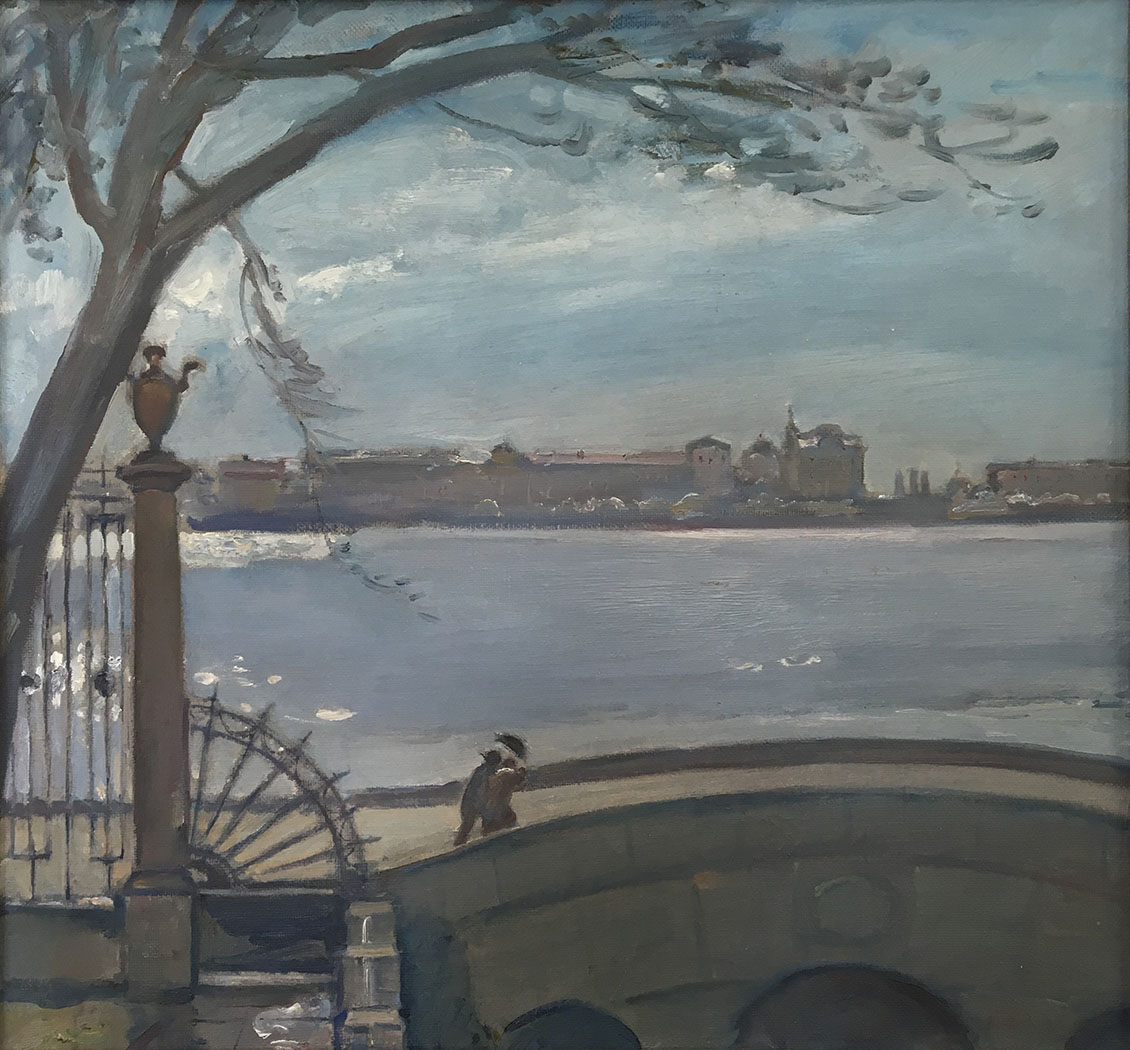
"Bridge by Summer gardens" - oil on canvas

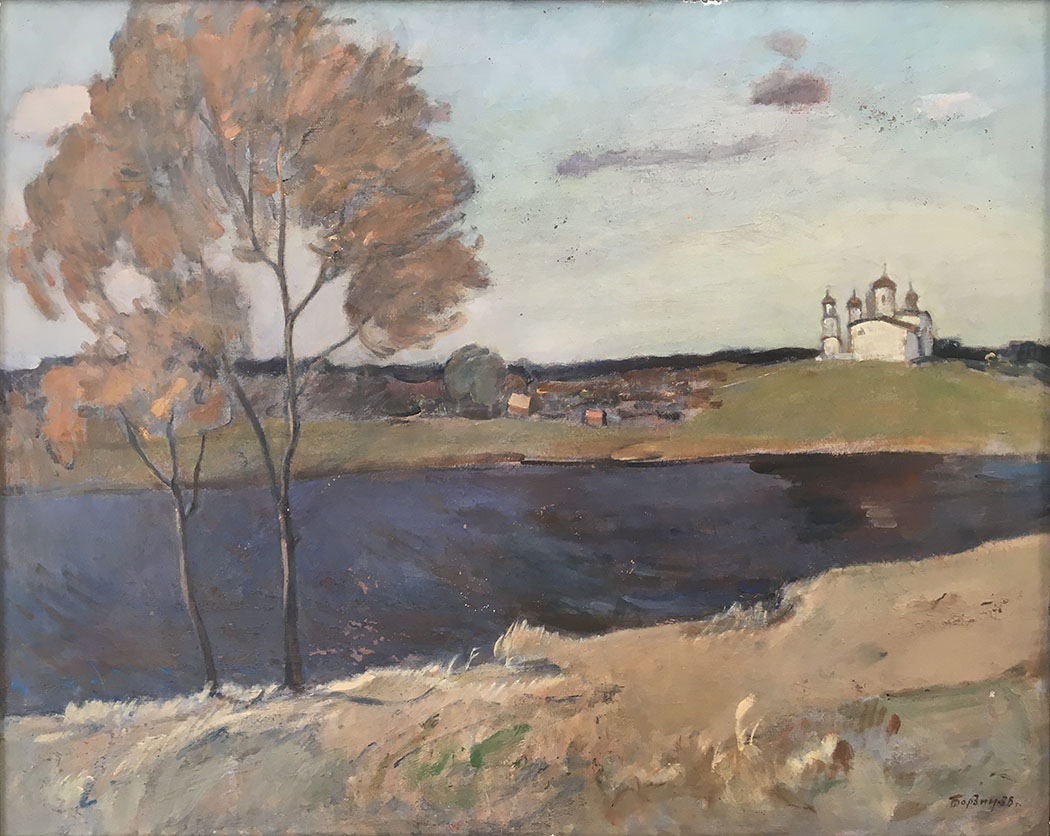
"Church by the riverbed" - oil on canvas

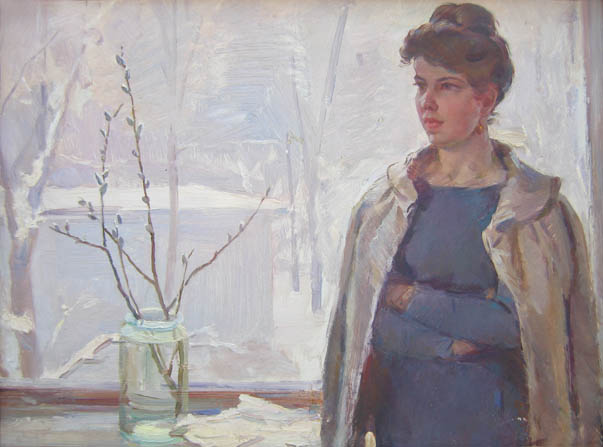
"Student by the window" - oil on board

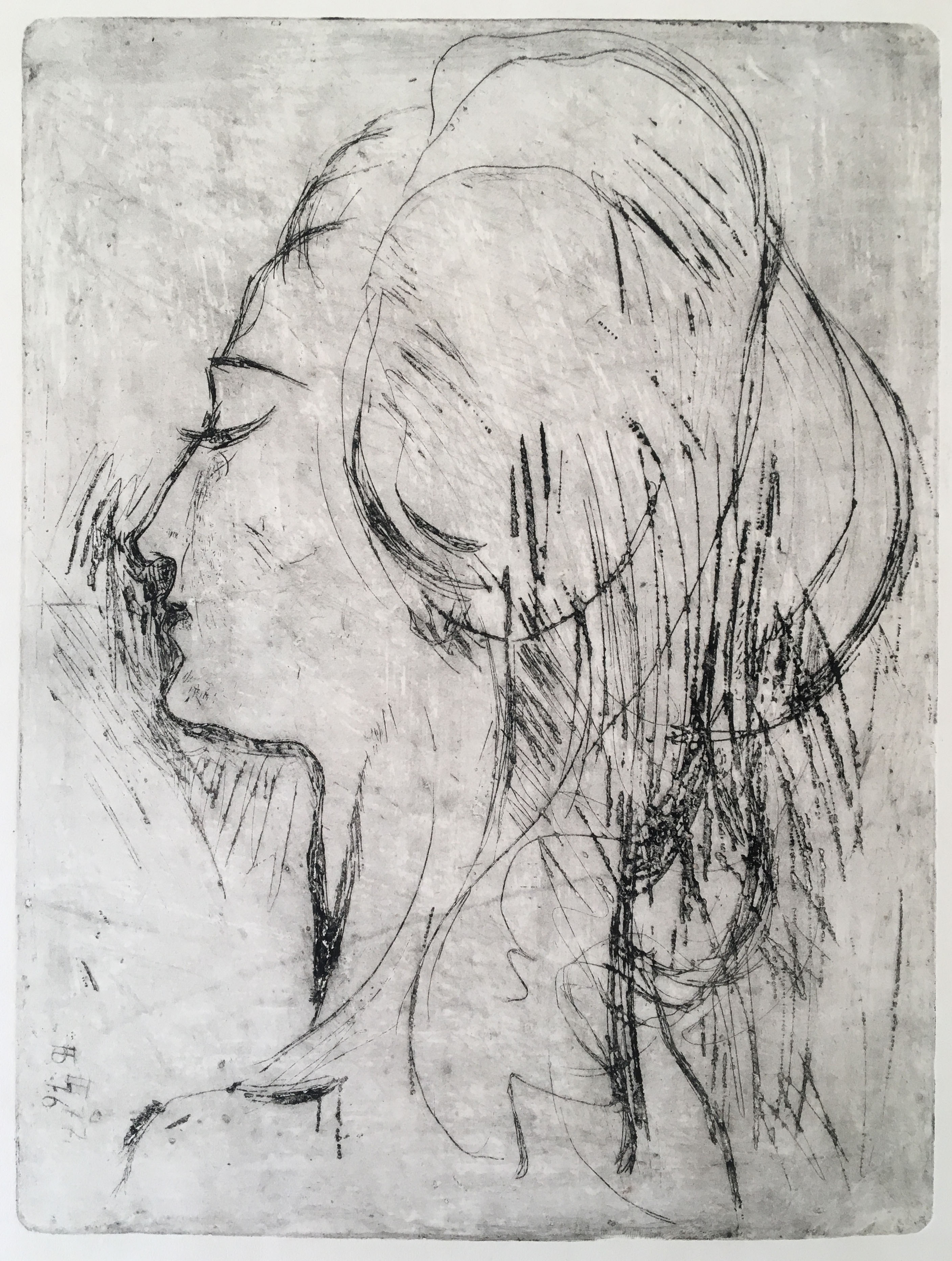
drawing of a woman - charcoal

== See also ==
- List of 20th century Russian painters
- List of painters of Saint Petersburg Union of Artists
- List of Russian landscape painters

== Bibliography ==
- 'Decorative Art of The Time of Peter The Great' (Росписи Петровкого Времени) - Published in Leningrad : "Khudozhnik RSFSR", 1986.
- 'Summer Garden and Summer Palace of Peter I' (Летний Сад И Летний Дворец Петра 1) - Leningrad : Lenizdat, 1988 By: O. N. Kuznetsova, B. F. Borzin
- Борзин, Борис Федорович. Монументально-декоративная живопись в России в первой четверти XVIII века [Текст] : Автореферат дис. на соискание ученой степени кандидата искусствоведения / Ин-т живописи, скульптуры и архитектуры им. И. Е. Репина Акад. художеств СССР. - Ленинград
