= Kapitolina Rumiantseva =

Russian artist (1925-2002)

Kapitolina Alexeevna Rumiantseva
- Born: December 16, 1925; Leningrad, USSR
- Died: August 8, 2002 (aged 76); Saint Petersburg, Russian Federation
- Education: Tavricheskaya Art School
- Known for: Painting, Graphics
- Movement: Realism

Kapitolina Alexeevna Rumiantseva (Russian: Капитоли́на Алексе́евна Румя́нцева; December 16, 1925 in Leningrad, USSR – August 8, 2002 in Saint Petersburg, Russian Federation) was a Russian Soviet realist painter and graphic artist, who lived and worked in Saint Petersburg (formerly Leningrad). She was a member of the Saint Petersburg Union of Artists (before 1992 named as the Leningrad branch of Union of Artists of Russian Federation), regarded as one of representatives of the Leningrad school of painting, most famous for her still life paintings.

== Biography ==
Kapitolina Alexeevna Rumiantseva was born December 16, 1925, in the Leningrad.

In 1945, Kapitolina Rumiantseva entered at the Tavricheskaya Art School, where she studied of George Shakh, Dina Rezanskaya, Valentina Petrova, and Mikhail Shuvaev. She graduated Art School in 1950.

After graduation, in 1950–1969 years Kapitolina Rumiantseva taught drawing and painting in secondary art school. Since 1970, Kapitolina Rumiantseva has participated in Art Exhibitions. She painted landscapes, still lifes, genre scenes, sketches from the life. Most famous for her sensual still lifes with wildlife flowers and fruits in interior and exterior.

Her painting style evolved in the direction to decorative and local color while maintaining interest to the object, for transfer of its texture and material tangibility. Her images invariably filled with lyricism and poetic sound.

In 1973 Kapitolina Rumiantseva was admitted to the Leningrad Union of Artists (since 1992 known as the Saint Petersburg Union of Artists).

At the beginning of 1990 her works were at expositions of some exhibitions abroad with other Leningrad artists[][][].

Kapitolina Alexeevna Rumiantseva died in Saint Petersburg in 2002. Her paintings reside in museums and private collections in Russia, France, Korea, in the U.S., England, Germany, China, Italy, and others.

Her style of painting developed to the intensification of ornamentality nevertheless without loss of an interest to the object with its touchableness. Her images are lyrical and very poetical. She is an author of paintings: «Stil life with Fruits» (1965)[], «Stil life with Melon»[] (1968), «Stil life with White Cup»[] (1969), «Irises»[] (1970), «Stil life with Orange», «Peones»[] (1971), «Dream»[], «Elder»[] (both 1972), «Stil life with Apple Tree Branches»[] (1973), «In the Garden at Early Spring», «Cloudy Day», «Натюрморт с рыбами»[] (all 1974), «After the Rain»[] (1980), «Autumn in Ozerki» (1985), «Autumn» (1987)[], «Peones»[] (1990), «Lilac»[] (1991) and others.

== See also ==
- Leningrad School of Painting
- List of Russian artists
- List of 20th-century Russian painters
- List of painters of Saint Petersburg Union of Artists
- Saint Petersburg Union of Artists
