= Lev Orekhov =

Russian painter

Lev Nikolaevich Orekhov
- Born: November 8, 1913; Tula, Russian Empire
- Died: November 6, 1992 (aged 78); Saint Petersburg, Russian Federation
- Education: Repin Institute of Arts
- Known for: Painting, Graphics
- Movement: Realism

Lev Nikolaevich Orekhov (Russian: Ле́в Никола́евич Оре́хов; November 8, 1913 – November 6, 1992) was a Russian Soviet painter, who lived and worked in Leningrad. He was regarded as one of the representatives of the Leningrad school of painting.

== Biography ==
Lev Nikolaevich Orekhov was born November 8, 1913, in the industrial city of Tula, located in the Moscow region of the Russian Empire.

In 1932, Orekhov entered at the first course of the painting department of the Leningrad Institute of Painting, Sculpture and Architecture. There, he studied under Boris Fogel, Semion Abugov, Genrikh Pavlovsky.

In 1939, Lev Orekhov graduated from the Leningrad Institute of Painting, Sculpture and Architecture in Alexander Osmerkin workshop. His graduation work was a genre painting named A Rest of collective farmers in haymaking time during the lunch break.

From 1939, Lev Orekhov participated in art exhibitions. He painted portraits, landscapes, still-life, genre scenes, and sketches from the life. In the 1950s, he was most famous for his Crimea etudes done from nature, later for summer landscapes and genre scenes of Russian countryside life.

In the 1950s, Lev Orekhov painted plein air, with special attention to lighting and tonal relationships. He painted with an accented stroke. In the 1960s, his style morphed towards a more decorative and graphic quality of painting. His drawing and composition become more abstract.

Since 1946, Lev Orekhov was a member of the Leningrad Union of Soviet Artists. He died on November 6, 1992, in Saint Petersburg. His paintings reside in museums and private collections in Russia, France, England, the U.S., Italy, and other countries.

== See also ==
- Leningrad School of Painting
- List of painters of Saint Petersburg Union of Artists
- List of the Russian Landscape painters
- Saint Petersburg Union of Artists

== Bibliography ==
- Russian Fine & Decorative Art. - Dallas, Texas: Heritage Auction Galleries, November 14, 2008. - p. 198.
- Sergei V. Ivanov. Unknown Socialist Realism. The Leningrad School. - Saint Petersburg: NP-Print Edition, 2007. – pp. 9, 27, 233, 295, 367, 386, 387, 390, 394–397, 400, 402, 404–406, 412, 414, 416–418, 420, 422, 423. ISBN 5-901724-21-6, ISBN 978-5-901724-21-7.
