= Valentina Monakhova =

Russian painter

Valentina Vasilievna Monakhova
- Born: 23 August 1932 (age 94); Leningrad, USSR
- Education: Repin Institute of Arts
- Known for: Painting
- Movement: Realism; Socialist realism

Valentina Vasilievna Monakhova (Russian: Валенти́на Васи́льевна Мона́хова; born 23 August 1932 in Leningrad, USSR) is a Soviet Russian painter, watercolorist, graphic artist, and art teacher, living and working in Saint Petersburg regarded as one of representatives of the Leningrad school of painting.

== Biography ==
Valentina Vasilievna Monakhova (born Valentina Vasilieva) was born on 23 August 1932 in Leningrad, USSR. In 1952 she entered the painting department of the Leningrad Institute of Painting, Sculpture and Architecture named after Ilya Repin. She studied at Leonid Khudiakov, Vasily Sokolov, Valery Pimenov, Alexander Zaytsev.

In 1958 Valentina Monakhova graduated from Ilya Repin Institute, Boris Ioganson personal art studio. Her graduation work was genre painting named "Uzbek Family", painted on the material of artist's journeys in Central Asia.

Valentina Monakhova began to participate in Art Exhibitions Since 1959. She paints portraits, genre paintings, landscapes, still life, sketches from the life. Valentina Monakhova works in the technique of oil painting, tempera painting, and watercolors. Her personal exhibition was in 1985 in Leningrad.

In 1958—1961 Monakhova worked in Central Asia and created big series of paintings and sketches on the theme of the East. Subsequently, the leading theme of her work became the image of young people to be disclosed primarily in the genre of portrait. Since the 1980s Valentina Monakhova works mainly in watercolors in the genre of still life of flowers.

Over the years, Valentina Monakhova combined her creative activities with pedagogical work. She taught in the National Art School in city Dushanbe, capital of Tadzhik Soviet Republic (1958–1960), then in the Tavricheskaya Art School in Leningrad (1961–1978), and the Secondary School of Arts (now the Artistic Lyceum named after Boris Ioganson of the Russian Academy of Arts) (1978–2007).

Valentina Monakhova is a member of Saint Petersburg Union of Artists (before 1992 - the Leningrad branch of Union of Artists of Russian Federation) since 1961.

Paintings by Valentina Vasilievna Monakhova reside in Art museums and private collections in Russia, France, Germany, USA, Uzbekistan, Tajikistan, England, and in other countries.

== See also ==
- Leningrad School of Painting
- List of painters of Saint Petersburg Union of Artists
- Saint Petersburg Union of Artists

== Bibliography ==
- Directory of members of the Leningrad branch of Union of Artists of Russian Federation. - Leningrad: Khudozhnik RSFSR, 1987. - p. 87.
- Saint-Pétersbourg - Pont-Audemer. Dessins, Gravures, Sculptures et Tableaux du XX siècle du fonds de L' Union des Artistes de Saint-Pétersbourg. - Pont-Audemer: 1994. - p. 75.
- Etudes done from nature by the Leningrad School's artists. Exhibition catalogue - Saint Petersburg: Nikolai Nekrasov Memorial museum, 1994. - p. 4.
- Lyrical motives in the works of artists of the war generation. Painting, drawings. Exhibition catalogue. - Saint Petersburg: Nikolai Nekrasov Memorial museum, 1995. - p. 4.
- Живопись 1940-1990 годов. Ленинградская школа. Выставка произведений. - Санкт-Петербург: Мемориальный музей Н. А. Некрасова, 1996. — с.3-4.
- Sergei V. Ivanov. Unknown Socialist Realism. The Leningrad School. Saint Petersburg, NP-Print Edition, 2007. P.182, 224, 242, 365, 398, 404, 405.
- Anniversary Directory graduates of Saint Petersburg State Academic Institute of Painting, Sculpture, and Architecture named after Ilya Repin, Russian Academy of Arts. 1915 - 2005. - Saint Petersburg: Pervotsvet Publishing House, 2007.- p. 80. ISBN 978-5-903677-01-6.
