= Vladimir Seleznev =

Russian painter (1928–1991)

- Владимир Селезнев
- Born: 3 August 1928; Leningrad, Soviet Union
- Died: 15 March 1991 (aged 62); Leningrad, Soviet Union
- Education: Repin Institute of Arts
- Known for: Painting
- Movement: Realism

Vladimir Ivanovich Seleznev (Russian: Владимир Иванович Селезнев; 3 August 1928 – 15 March 1991) was a Soviet Russian realist painter, lived and worked in Leningrad, member of the Leningrad branch of Union of Artists of Russian Federation, regarded by art historian Sergei V. Ivanov as a representative of the Leningrad school of painting, most famous for his genre paintings and portraits.

== Biography ==
Vladimir Ivanovich Seleznev was born on 3 August 1928 in the Leningrad, USSR.

In 1953 Vladimir Seleznev graduated from Ilya Repin Institute in Rudolf Frentz workshop. He studied under Mikhail Platunov, Ivan Stepashkin, Piotr Belousov, and Yuri Neprintsev.

Since 1951 Vladimir Seleznev has participated in Art Exhibitions. He painted portraits, landscapes, battle and historical paintings, genre scenes, and etudes done from nature.

Vladimir Seleznev was a member of Leningrad Union of Artists since 1953.

Vladimir Ivanovich Seleznev died on 15 March 1991 in Leningrad. His paintings reside in Art museums and private collections in Russia, USA, France, England, and throughout the world.

== Bibliography ==
- Directory of members of the Leningrad branch of Union of Artists of Russian Federation. - Leningrad: Khudozhnik RSFSR, 1987. - p. 116.
- Matthew C. Bown. Dictionary of 20th Century Russian and Soviet Painters 1900-1980s. - London: Izomar, 1998. ISBN 0-9532061-0-6, ISBN 978-0-9532061-0-0.
- Anniversary Directory graduates of Saint Petersburg State Academic Institute of Painting, Sculpture, and Architecture named after Ilya Repin, Russian Academy of Arts. 1915 - 2005. - Saint Petersburg: Pervotsvet Publishing House, 2007. - p. 71. ISBN 978-5-903677-01-6.
