= Victor Otiev =

Russian painter

Victor Alexandrovich Otiev
- Born: 24 February 1935; Vladikavkaz, Northern Osetia, USSR
- Died: 7 June 1999 (aged 64); Saint Petersburg, Russian Federation
- Education: Repin Institute of Arts
- Known for: Painting, graphics
- Movement: Realism

Victor Alexandrovich Otiev (Russian: Ви́ктор Алекса́ндрович О́тиев; 24 February 1935 – 7 June 1999) was a Soviet, Russian painter, graphic artist, lived and worked in Leningrad, regarded as one of representatives of the Leningrad school of painting.

== Biography ==
In 1955 he went to Leningrad and entered at the painting department of the Leningrad Institute of Painting, Sculpture and Architecture named after Ilya Repin, where he was a student of Boris Ugarov, Andrei Mylnikov, Nikita Medovikov and Vladislav Anisovich.

In 1961 Otiev graduated from the Leningrad Institute of Painting, Sculpture and Architecture in Victor Oreshnikov's workshop. His graduation work was genre painting named "A Herdsman".

Since 1950, Otiev participated in art exhibitions. He painted landscapes, portraits, genre paintings, scenes with horses, sketches from the life. One of the leading themes of his art – an equestrian sport. His personal exhibition was in Leningrad in 1980. Otiev was a member of the Saint Petersburg Union of Artists (before 1992 – the Leningrad branch of Union of Artists of Russian Federation) since 1967.

Otiev died on 7 June 1999 in Saint Petersburg. Paintings by Otiev reside in art museums and private collections in Russia, France, England, the United States, Japan, Italy, and other countries.

== Bibliography ==
- Sergei V. Ivanov. Unknown Socialist Realism. The Leningrad School. - Saint Petersburg: NP-Print Edition, 2007. – pp. 186, 192, 367, 395–397, 400, 404–406, 417, 418, 420, 422, 423. ISBN 5-901724-21-6, ISBN 978-5-901724-21-7.
- Anniversary Directory graduates of Saint Petersburg State Academic Institute of Painting, Sculpture, and Architecture named after Ilya Repin, Russian Academy of Arts. 1915 - 2005. - Saint Petersburg: Pervotsvet Publishing House, 2007. p. 87.
