= 1977 in fine arts of the Soviet Union =

The year 1977 was marked by many events that left an imprint on the history of Soviet and Russian Fine Arts.

== Events ==
- Traditional Exhibition of works of Leningrad artists - the Great Patriotic War veterans was opened in the Leningrad Union of Artists on the eve of Victory Day (9 May). The participants were Piotr Alberti, Ivan Andreev, Andrei Bantikov, Nikolai Baskakov, Nikolai Brandt, Vladimir Chekalov, Evgeny Chuprun, Sergei Frolov, Mikhail Grachev, Solomon Epshtein, Alexei Eriomin, Mikhail Kaneev, Yuri Khukhrov, Maya Kopitseva, Elena Kostenko, Gevork Kotiantz, Mikhail Kozell, Boris Lavrenko, Oleg Lomakin, Nikolai Mukho, Piotr Nazarov, Mikhail Natarevich, Samuil Nevelshtein, Anatoli Nenartovich, Yuri Neprintsev, Lev Orekhov, Sergei Osipov, Victor Reykhet, Gleb Savinov, Alexander Semionov, Arseny Semionov, Alexander Shmidt, German Tatarinov, Nikolai Timkov, Mikhail Tkachev, Ivan Varichev, Anatoli Vasiliev, Joseph Zysman, Ruben Zakharian, and other important Leningrad artists.
- Exhibition «Selfportrait in Russian and Soviet Art» was opened in the Russian museum in Leningrad.

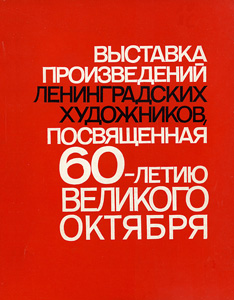
Exhibition catalog

- November 5 — Exhibition of Leningrad artists, dedicated to 60th Anniversary of October Revolution of 1917, was opened in the new Central Exhibition Hall «Manezh» in Leningrad. The participants were Evgenia Antipova, Taisia Afonina, Vladislav Anisovich, Leonid Baykov, Irina Baldina, Nikolai Baskakov, Leonid Baykov, Evgenia Baykova, Vsevolod Bazhenov, Yuri Belov, Piotr Belousov, Olga Bogaevskaya, Lev Bogomolets, Veniamin Borisov, Nikolai Brandt, Dmitry Buchkin, Sergei Frolov, Nikolai Galakhov, Ivan Godlevsky, Vasily Golubev, Abram Grushko, Irina Dobrekova, Oleg Eremeev, Alexei Eriomin, Mikhail Kaneev, Yuri Khukhrov, Maria Kleschar-Samokhvalova, Maya Kopitseva, Victor Korovin, Elena Kostenko, Nikolai Kostrov, Anna Kostrova, Gevork Kotiantz, Mikhail Kozell, Engels Kozlov, Marina Kozlovskaya, Vladimir Krantz, Yaroslav Krestovsky, Boris Lavrenko, Ivan Lavsky, Oleg Lomakin, Dmitry Maevsky, Gavriil Malish, Yuri Mezhirov, Evsey Moiseenko, Andrei Mylnikov, Vera Nazina, Mikhail Natarevich, Yuri Neprintsev, Samuil Nevelshtein, Yaroslav Nikolaev, Dmitry Oboznenko, Victor Oreshnikov, Sergei Osipov, Lia Ostrova, Vladimir Ovchinnikov, Vyacheslav Ovchinnikov, Yuri Pavlov, Varlen Pen, Nikolai Pozdneev, Alexander Pushnin, Valentina Rakhina, Semion Rotnitsky, Ivan Savenko, Gleb Savinov, Vladimir Sakson, Arseny Semionov, Alexander Semionov, Yuri Shablikin, Boris Shamanov, Alexander Shmidt, Nadezhda Shteinmiller, Elena Skuin, Kim Slavin, Alexander Shmidt, Alexander Sokolov, Alexander Stolbov, Alexander Tatarenko, German Tatarinov, Victor Teterin, Nikolai Timkov, Leonid Tkachenko, Yuri Tulin, Vitaly Tulenev, Vitaly Tulenev, Boris Ugarov, Igor Veselkin, Ivan Varichev, Anatoli Vasiliev, Valery Vatenin, Lazar Yazgur, German Yegoshin, Vecheslav Zagonek, Sergei Zakharov, Ruben Zakharian, Elena Zhukova, and other important Leningrad artists.
- Exhibition of Alexander Vedernikov was opened in the Leningrad Union of Artists.
- Exhibition of three Leningrad artists Arseny Semionov, Sergei Osipov, and Kyrill Gushin was opened in the Leningrad Union of Artists.
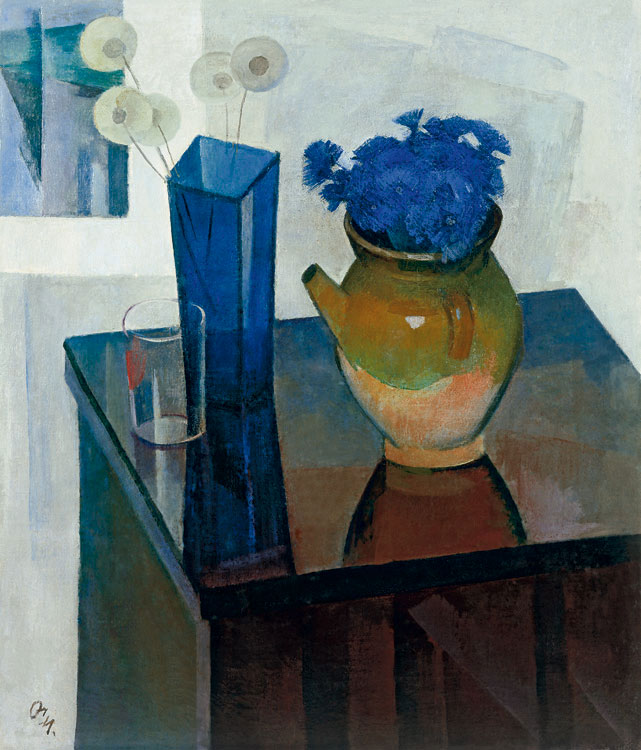
Sergei Osipov
Cornflowers. 1976

== Deaths ==
- January 13 — Alexei Gryschenko (Russian: Грищенко Алексей Васильевич), Russian painter and graphic artist, since 1922 lived in France (born 1883).
- June 16 — Valery Vatenin (Russian: Ватенин, Валерий Владимирович), Russian soviet painter and graphic artist (born 1933).

=== Full date unknown ===
- Yuriy Pimenov (Russian: Пименов Юрий Иванович), Russian soviet painter and graphic artist, People's Artist of the USSR (born 1903).

== See also ==
- List of Russian artists
- List of painters of Leningrad Union of Artists
- Saint Petersburg Union of Artists
- Russian culture

== Sources ==
- Нехорошев Ю. Искать таланты. Заметки с выставки дипломных работ выпускников художественных вузов СССР // Советская культура, 1977, 1 марта.
- Республиканская выставка произведений художников РСФСР «60 лет Великого Октября». Каталог. М., Советский художник, 1977.
- Семенов А., Осипов С., Гущин К. Каталог выставки произведений. Л., Художник РСФСР, 1977.
- Ведерников Александр Семенович. Выставка произведений. Каталог. Л., Художник РСФСР, 1977.
- Годлевский Иван Иванович. Выставка произведений. Каталог. Л., Художник РСФСР, 1977.
- Викулов Василий Иванович. Выставка произведений. Каталог. Л., Художник РСФСР, 1977.
- Петров Сергей Александрович. Выставка произведений. Каталог. Л., Художник РСФСР, 1977.
- Венкова Ия Андреевна. Выставка произведений. Каталог. Л., Художник РСФСР, 1977.
- Выставка произведений ленинградских художников, посвященная 60-летию Великого Октября. Каталог. Л., Художник РСФСР, 1977.
- Artists of Peoples of the USSR. Biobibliography Dictionary. Vol. 1. Moscow, Iskusstvo, 1970.
- Artists of Peoples of the USSR. Biobibliography Dictionary. Vol. 2. Moscow, Iskusstvo, 1972.
- Directory of Members of Union of Artists of USSR. Volume 1,2. Moscow, Soviet Artist Edition, 1979.
- Directory of Members of the Leningrad branch of the Union of Artists of Russian Federation. Leningrad, Khudozhnik RSFSR, 1980.
- Artists of Peoples of the USSR. Biobibliography Dictionary. Vol. 4 Book 1. Moscow, Iskusstvo, 1983.
- Directory of Members of the Leningrad branch of the Union of Artists of Russian Federation. - Leningrad: Khudozhnik RSFSR, 1987.
- Artists of peoples of the USSR. Biobibliography Dictionary. Vol. 4 Book 2. - Saint Petersburg: Academic project humanitarian agency, 1995.
- Link of Times: 1932 - 1997. Artists - Members of Saint Petersburg Union of Artists of Russia. Exhibition catalogue. - Saint Petersburg: Manezh Central Exhibition Hall, 1997.
- Matthew C. Bown. Dictionary of 20th Century Russian and Soviet Painters 1900-1980s. - London: Izomar, 1998.
- Vern G. Swanson. Soviet Impressionism. - Woodbridge, England: Antique Collectors' Club, 2001.
- Петр Фомин. Живопись. Воспоминания современников. СПб., 2002. С.107.
- Время перемен. Искусство 1960—1985 в Советском Союзе. СПб., Государственный Русский музей, 2006.
- Sergei V. Ivanov. Unknown Socialist Realism. The Leningrad School. - Saint-Petersburg: NP-Print Edition, 2007. - ISBN 5-901724-21-6, ISBN 978-5-901724-21-7.
- Anniversary Directory graduates of Saint Petersburg State Academic Institute of Painting, Sculpture, and Architecture named after Ilya Repin, Russian Academy of Arts. 1915 - 2005. - Saint Petersburg: Pervotsvet Publishing House, 2007.
