= Art belongs to the people =

1977 art exhibition in the USSR

Art belongs to the people. Anniversary Exhibition of Leningrad artists. Leningrad, 1977. Catalog
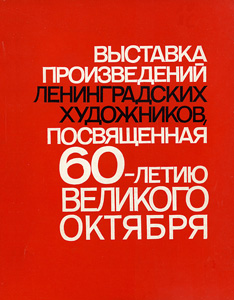
- Year: 1977
- Location: Manege Central Exhibition Hall; Leningrad

Art belongs to the people. Anniversary Exhibition of Leningrad artists (Leningrad, 1977) (Russian: Искусство принадлежит народу. Выставка произведений ленинградских художников, посвящённая 60-летию Великого Октября), dedicated to 60th Anniversary of Great October Revolution of 1917, became one of the most significant art event of 1977 in the USSR. The Exhibition took place in the new exhibition space - The Central Exhibition Hall Maneze, which has become the largest exhibition area of the city.

== History and Organization ==
The Anniversary Exhibition was opened at November 5, 1977, under the motto "Art belongs to the people". Organization and preparation of Exhibition engaged specially formed Exhibition Committee under the chairmanship of Boris Ugarov, which consisted of 43 the most authoritative art-experts. It was published Catalog of Exhibition. In total the Exhibition displayed 1,400 works of art of painters, sculptors, graphics, masters of arts and crafts, artists of theater and cinema and attended by over 750 artists of Leningrad.

== Contributing Artists ==
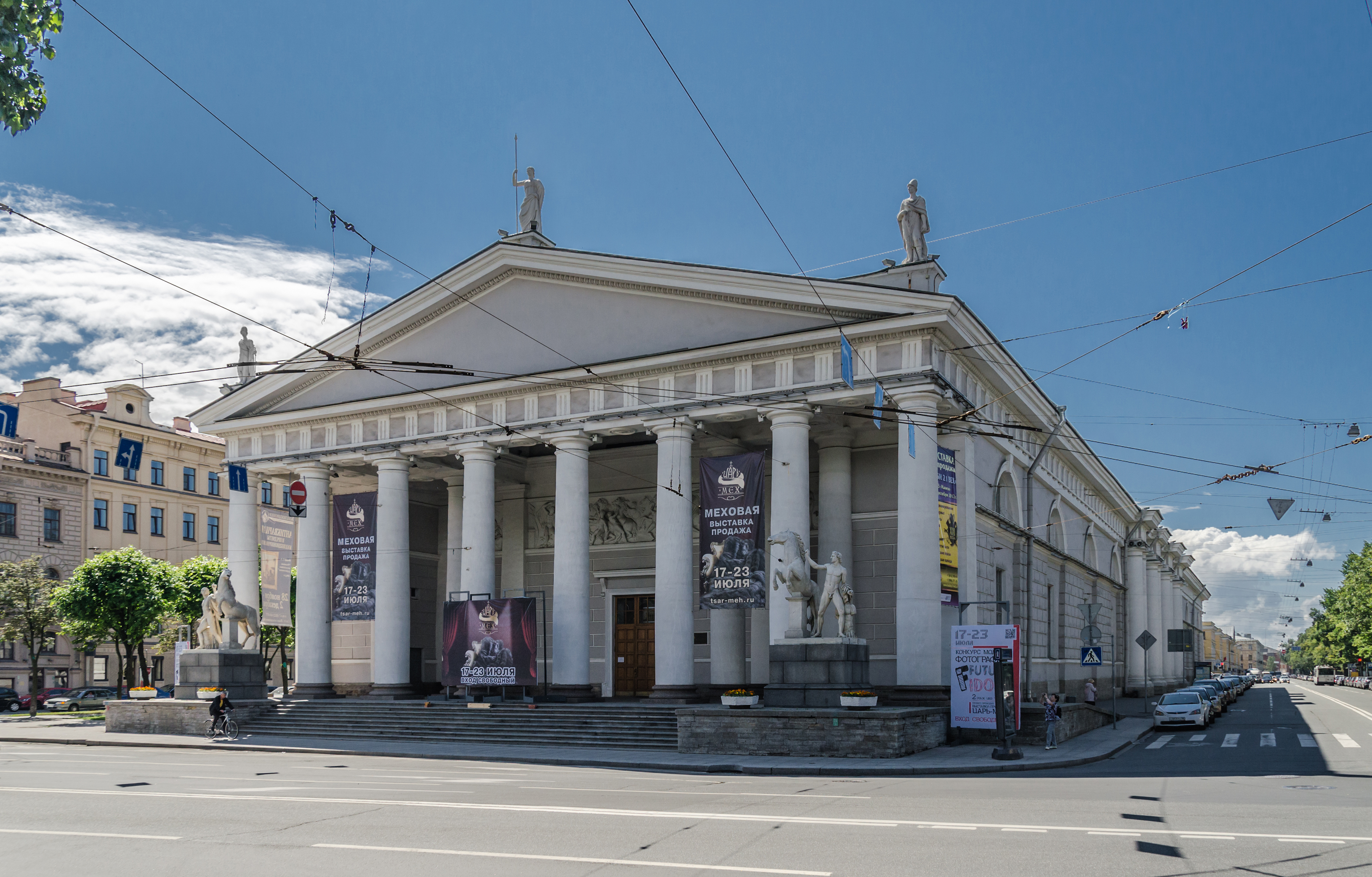
Manege Central Exhibition Hall (Saint Petersburg)

In the largest Department of Painting were exhibited art works of 243 authors. There were Evgenia Antipova, Taisia Afonina, Vladislav Anisovich, Leonid Baykov, Irina Baldina, Nikolai Baskakov, Leonid Baykov, Evgenia Baykova, Vsevolod Bazhenov, Yuri Belov, Piotr Belousov, Olga Bogaevskaya, Lev Bogomolets, Veniamin Borisov, Nikolai Brandt, Dmitry Buchkin, Sergei Frolov, Nikolai Galakhov, Ivan Godlevsky, Vasily Golubev, Abram Grushko, Irina Dobrekova, Oleg Eremeev, Alexei Eriomin, Mikhail Kaneev, Yuri Khukhrov, Maria Kleschar-Samokhvalova, Maya Kopitseva, Victor Korovin, Elena Kostenko, Nikolai Kostrov, Anna Kostrova, Gevork Kotiantz, Mikhail Kozell, Engels Kozlov, Marina Kozlovskaya, Vladimir Krantz, Yaroslav Krestovsky, Boris Lavrenko, Ivan Lavsky, Oleg Lomakin, Dmitry Maevsky, Gavriil Malish, Yuri Mezhirov, Evsey Moiseenko, Andrei Mylnikov, Vera Nazina, Mikhail Natarevich, Yuri Neprintsev, Samuil Nevelshtein, Yaroslav Nikolaev, Dmitry Oboznenko, Victor Oreshnikov, Sergei Osipov, Lia Ostrova, Vladimir Ovchinnikov, Vyacheslav Ovchinnikov, Yuri Pavlov, Varlen Pen, Nikolai Pozdneev, Alexander Pushnin, Valentina Rakhina, Semion Rotnitsky, Ivan Savenko, Gleb Savinov, Vladimir Sakson, Arseny Semionov, Alexander Semionov, Yuri Shablikin, Boris Shamanov, Alexander Shmidt, Nadezhda Shteinmiller, Elena Skuin, Kim Slavin, Alexander Shmidt, Alexander Sokolov, Alexander Stolbov, Alexander Tatarenko, German Tatarinov, Victor Teterin, Nikolai Timkov, Leonid Tkachenko, Yuri Tulin, Vitaly Tulenev, Vitaly Tulenev, Boris Ugarov, Igor Veselkin, Ivan Varichev, Anatoli Vasiliev, Valery Vatenin, Lazar Yazgur, German Yegoshin, Vecheslav Zagonek, Sergei Zakharov, Ruben Zakharian, Elena Zhukova, and others most prominent painters of the Leningrad School.

In the Department of Sculptures were exhibited art works of 153 sculptors. Department of graphics presented a creation of 207 artists.

== Contributed Artworks ==
For the Exhibition were selected art works created in years of 1976–1977, also some earlier works. All of them were exhibited at first time. Some of them were subsequently found in the collections of leading Soviet Art museums, as well as domestic and foreign galleries and collectors. The retrospective section of the exhibition was presented by works of famous masters from Art Museums and private collections. Among them were art works of Isaak Brodsky, Joseph Serebriany, Boris Kustodiev, Kuzma Petrov-Vodkin, Rudolf Frentz and others.

Genre and Historical painting were presented of "Entrance in the Leningrad Sea Port" by Lev Bogomolets, "The Beginning of Summer" by Dmitry Buchkin, "In the old far village" by Nikolai Galakhov, "Plane arrived" by Abram Grushko, "Bonfires of October" by Oleg Eremeev, "May 9 in Zaonezhie" by Alexei Eriomin, "On the shore of Samatlor Lake" by Yuri Khukhrov, "October, 1917" by Boris Lavrenko, "The new Constitution" by Yuri Mezhirov, "Concert", "Grenada", "On the river" by Evsey Moiseenko, "Federico García Lorca" by Andrei Mylnikov, "Evening", "Saturday", "Close to the old Apple Tree" by Mikhail Natarevich, "Sunday morning" by Lia Ostrova, "In a watch factory" by Vyacheslav Ovchinnikov, "Evening in the Gorushky village" by Yuri Pavlov, "Weather Station" by Nikolai Pozdneev, "Interior. In the Art Studio" by Valentina Rakhina, "Siberian trailblazers" by Ivan Savenko, "Helicopter arrived" by Yuri Shablikin, "Relaxation. Haymaking time" by Alexander Stolbov, "Petrograd City in 1917" by Alexander Tatarenko, "Talking with Lenin" by Vitaly Tulenev, "Meeting of Leningraders with guerrillas" by Yuri Tulin, "Soldiers of the Revolution" by Boris Ugarov, and some others.

Portrait was presented of "Portrait of student Ufimtseva" by Vladislav Anisovich, "Portrait of artist Alexei Eriomin" by Irina Baldina, "Portrait of Old Uzbek woman" by Nikolai Baskakov, "Portrait of daughter" by Piotr Belousov, "Katya with a doll" by Olga Bogaevskaya, "Milkmaid" by Nikolai Brandt, "Old Fisherman" by Irina Dobrekova, "Portrait of Academician Mikhail Kostenko" by Elena Kostenko, "Portrait of student Irina Shepelina" by Engels Kozlov, "Portrait of young Power Engineer" by Yuri Mezhirov, "War veteran and his mother" by Vera Nazina, "Katya", "Young lad", "Ludmila" by Samuil Nevelshtein, "Commander" by Dmitry Oboznenko, "Portrait of Masha Chystakova", "Portrait of Badmaev", "Prof. A. Gorban" by Victor Oreshnikov, "Portrait of Ira with the dragonfly" by Lia Ostrova, "Portrait of Boris Tokin", "Scientist Vadim Fomichyov" by Varlen Pen, "Portrait of A. Mirolubov" by Semion Rotnitsky, "Alexander Pushkin in Mikhailovskoye village" by Igor Veselkin, and some others.

Landscape, Seascape and Cityscape were presented of "Northern landscape" by Vsevolod Bazhenov, "The new district of Leningrad" by Leonid Baykov, "Murmansk Sea Port" by Lev Bogomolets, "Silent evening" by Veniamin Borisov, "Twilight" by Nikolai Brandt, "Drizzle" by Dmitry Buchkin, "Northern Summer" by Nikolai Galakhov, "Storm on the Sea" by Ivan Godlevsky, "Green expanses", "Autumn harvest" by Vasily Golubev, "A White Night", "Autumn Day" by Alexei Eriomin, "Nevsky Prospekt", "Konushennaya square", "Moyka River", "Neva River" by Mikhail Kaneev, "Rowan-tree" by Maria Kleschar-Samokhvalova, "Spring in the village" by Mikhail Kozell, "Leningrad Motive" by Yaroslav Krestovsky, "Fields and copses" by Dmitry Maevsky, "Spring" by Gavriil Malish, "Petrovskaya Embankment in Leningrad" by Yaroslav Nikolaev, "Little street in winter", "A trickle in the ravine", "Autumn Morning" by Sergei Osipov, "White night. Karpovka River" by Vladimir Ovchinnikov, "Barents Sea" by Nikolai Pozdneev, "Kirenga River" by Ivan Savenko, "A Window", "Cityscape of the Leningrad" by Gleb Savinov, "Autumn day in Summer garden" by Alexander Semionov, "Staritsa. Winter landscape", "Street in Venice" by Arseny Semionov, "Evening in Shozhma" by Yuri Shablikin, "Summer Midday", "A May. The Bird-Cherry" by Boris Shamanov, "Summer" by Elena Skuin, "Spring. Bird-Cherry tree", "Twilight. Fog" by Kim Slavin, "Young Pines" by Alexander Shmidt, "Twilight on the Pona river", "February", "Northern Spring" by Alexander Sokolov, "The Young May" by German Tatarinov, "First Snow", "Autumn" by Nikolai Timkov, "A March", "Winter", "Winter Day", "On the Volkhov River", "Evening ray", "A Winter" by Ivan Varichev, "Silence" by Anatoli Vasiliev, "Ice move" by Lazar Yazgur, "Fontanka river", "Montmartre", "Terrace by the Sea" by German Yegoshin, "The Cherry Orchard", "First houses on the seashore" by Elena Zhukova, and some others.

Still life painting was presented of "Still life with Samovar", "Still life with Bird" by Olga Bogaevskaya, "Still life with Jug" by Nikolai Brandt, "A Branch of Cherry", "Blue tableware" by Maya Kopitseva, "Pink Still life" by Gevork Kotiantz, "Mining minerals and fruits" by Gavriil Malish, "Still life with a white vase" by Evsey Moiseenko, "Still life with Blue Tea-Cup" by Sergei Osipov, "Peonies" by Valentina Rakhina, "Roses", "Roses and Dog-roses" by Gleb Savinov, "Still life with Dogrose", "Flowers and fern" by Boris Shamanov, "A Honey" by Elena Skuin, "Still life at the barn", "Still life with dogrose" by Victor Teterin, "Golden cacti", "Decorative vase" by Leonid Tkachenko, "Still life with Bells" by Valery Vatenin, and some others.

== Acknowledgment ==
Anniversary Art Exhibition of 1977 was widely covered in press and in literature on Soviet fine art.

== See also ==
- Fine Art of Leningrad
- Soviet art
- 1977 in fine arts of the Soviet Union
- Leningrad School of Painting
- Saint Petersburg Union of Artists
- Socialist realism

== Sources ==
- Выставка произведений ленинградских художников, посвященная 60-летию Великого Октября. Каталог. Л., Художник РСФСР, 1982.
- Искусство принадлежит народу. Выставка произведений художников Ленинграда. Л., Художник РСФСР, 1979.
- Справочник членов Ленинградской организации Союза художников РСФСР. Л., Художник РСФСР, 1980.
- Художники народов СССР. Биографический словарь. Т.1-4. М., Искусство, 1970–1995.
- Справочник членов Союза художников СССР. Том 1,2. М., Советский художник, 1979.
- Time for Change. The Art of 1960-1985 in the Soviet Union. Saint Petersburg, State Russian Museum, 2006. P.381.
- Sergei V. Ivanov. Unknown Socialist Realism. The Leningrad School. Saint Petersburg: NP-Print Edition, 2007. P.393. ISBN 5-901724-21-6, ISBN 978-5-901724-21-7
- Юбилейный Справочник выпускников Санкт-Петербургского академического института живописи, скульптуры и архитектуры имени И. Е. Репина Российской Академии художеств. 1915–2005. Санкт-Петербург, «Первоцвет», 2007.
