= Our Contemporary =

1971 art exhibition in Leningrad, USSR

Our Contemporary. Exhibition of Leningrad artists of 1971. Catalog
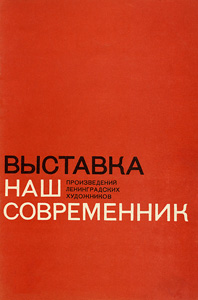
- Year: 1971
- Location: State Russian Museum; Leningrad

"Our Contemporary" Exhibition of Leningrad artists of 1971 (Russian: Наш современник. Выставка произведений ленинградских художников 1971 года) became one of the notable events in Art live of Leningrad of the beginning of 1970s. The exhibition took place in the State Russian Museum. Exhibition opened a series of Leningrad, Zonal and National art exhibitions of the 1970s, dedicated to image of our contemporary.

== History and organization ==
Organization and preparation of Exhibition engaged a specially formed Exhibition Committee which consisted of 13 the authoritative art-experts. It published a catalog of the exhibition. The exhibition displayed works of art of leading Leningrad painters, sculptors, and graphics artists.

== Contributing artists ==
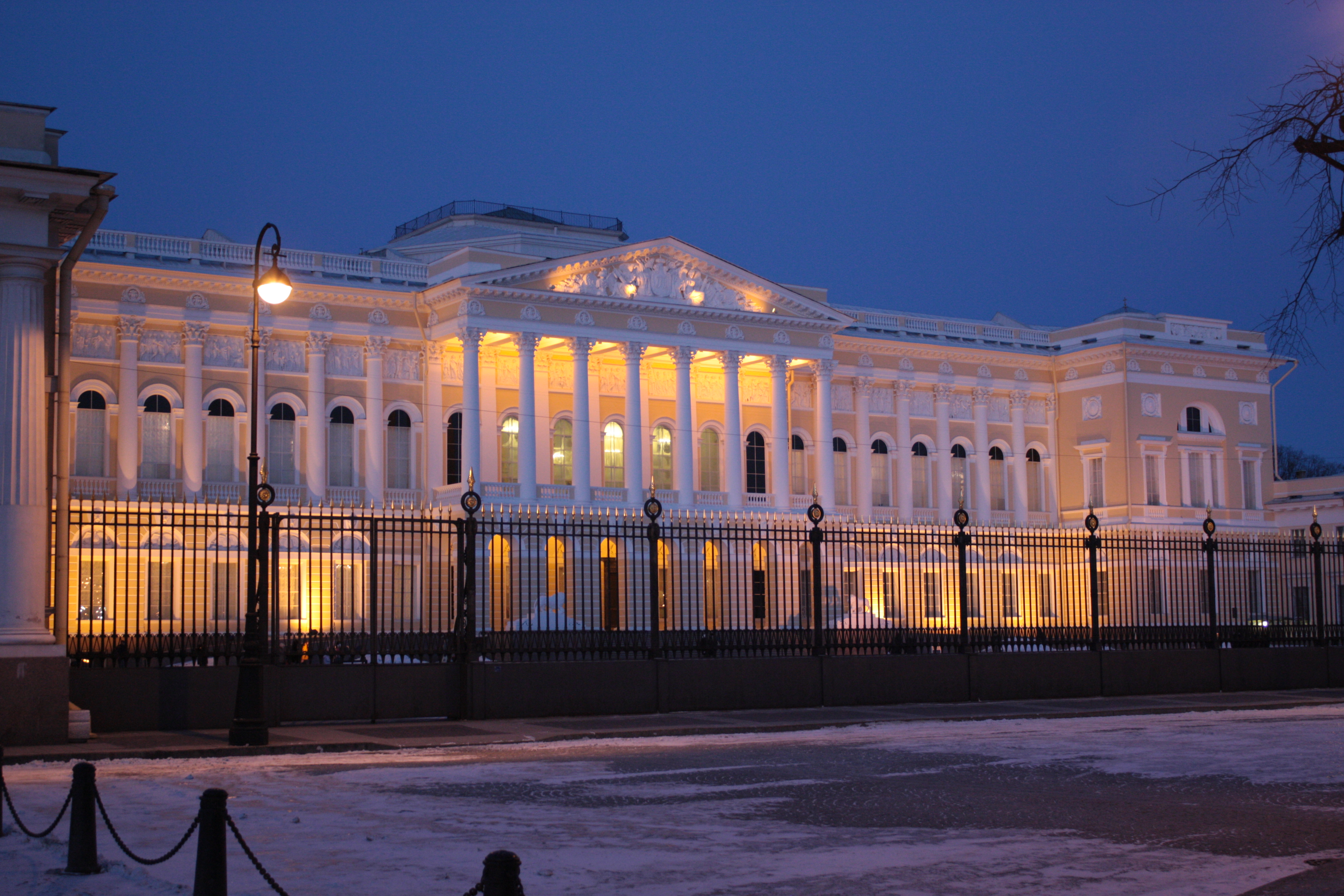
State Russian Museum

In the largest Department of Painting were exhibited art works of 171 authors. There were Irina Baldina, Nikolai Baskakov, Yuri Belov, Olga Bogaevskaya, Boris F. Borzin, Nikolai Brandt, Dmitry Buchkin, Tatiana Gorb, Irina Dobrekova, Oleg Eremeev, Alexei Eriomin, Yuri Khukhrov, Maya Kopitseva, Tatiana Kopnina, Boris Korneev, Elena Kostenko, Anna Kostrova, Gevork Kotiantz, Engels Kozlov, Boris Lavrenko, Anatoli Levitin, Oleg Lomakin, Dmitry Maevsky, Gavriil Malish, Boris Maluev, Yuri Mezhirov, Evsey Moiseenko, Mikhail Natarevich, Vera Nazina, Yuri Neprintsev, Samuil Nevelshtein, Yaroslav Nikolaev, Lev Orekhov, Victor Oreshnikov, Lia Ostrova, Victor Otiev, Yuri Pavlov, Varlen Pen, Nikolai Pozdneev, Stepan Privedentsev, Semion Rotnitsky, Vladimir Sakson, Ivan Savenko, Gleb Savinov, Alexander Shmidt, Elena Skuin, Galina Smirnova, Alexander Stolbov, Alexander Tatarenko, Nikolai Timkov, Mikhail Trufanov, Yuri Tulin, Vitaly Tulenev, Alexander Shmidt, Boris Ugarov, Valery Vatenin, Igor Veselkin, Vecheslav Zagonek, Ruben Zakharian, Elena Zhukova, and others most prominent painters of the Leningrad School.

In the Department of Sculptures were exhibited art works of 114 sculptors. Department of graphics presented a creation of 68 artists.

== Contributed artworks ==
For the Exhibition were selected art works created in years of 1970-1971, also some earlier works. All they were exhibited in the first time. Some of them were subsequently found in the collections of leading Soviet Art museums, as well as domestic and foreign galleries and collectors. In exposition were presented all genres of contemporary painting: portrait, historical and genre scenes, landscape and cityscape, still life.

Portrait of workers of Science and Culture was presented of "Composer Dmitri Shostakovich" by Irina Baldina, "Portrait of Sherbin, professor of the Leningrad University" by Nikolai Baskakov, "Portrait of artist Piotr Buchkin" by Dmitry Buchkin, "Portrait of artist" by Oleg Eremeev, "Portrait of Admiral Kulakov", "Portrait of Mikushev, doctor of philosophy" by Engels Kozlov, "Architect Maslov" by Boris Lavrenko, "Maria Molodaya, PhD in Economics" by Boris Maluev, "Portrait of Nikolai Sokolov, singer of Kirov Opera", "Portrait of Klimova, primadonna of Maly Opera Theatre" by Yuri Mezhirov, "Selfportrait" by Mikhail Natarevich, "Portrait of Academician Voyachek" by Yaroslav Nikolaev, "Portrait of art critic Ikonnikova" by Lev Orekhov, "Portrait of Boris Piotrovsky" by Victor Oreshnikov, "Portrait of artist Natasha Kornilova" by Lia Ostrova, "Portrait of artist Bekshinskaya" by Yuri Pavlov, "Portrait of a heart surgeon Uglov", "Portrait of academician Alexeev", "Portrait of poet Orlov" by Varlen Pen, "Portrait of an art critic Kornilov" by Semion Rotnitsky, "Portrait of artist Oleg Pochenny" by Alexander Stolbov, "Portrait of Boris Shtokolov, singer of Kirov Opera" by Mikhail Trufanov, "Selfportrait". "Portrait of Vladislav Strzhelchik, actor of Bolshoi Drama Theater" by Yuri Tulin, "Portrait of composer Andrey Petrov" by Boris Ugarov, "Portrait of sculptor A. Strekavin" by Ruben Zakharian, and some others.

Portrait of a working man was presented of "Portrait of brother", "Portrait of Yakovlev, veteran of Kirov Plant" by Nikolai Baskakov, "Portrait of milker Alexeev" by Yuri Belov, "Caster Ivan Boytsov" by Irina Dobrekova, "Portrait of a notable worker Vinogradov" by Oleg Eremeev, "Portrait of V. Komissarihin, carpenter and restorer" by Alexei Eriomin, "Metro worker" by Yuri Khukhrov, "Saleswoman deli" by Gevork Kotiantz, "Portrait of mechanic V. Izosimov", "Portrait of worker Kurbatov" by Engels Kozlov, "M. Eparin, Captain of the Fishing port of Murmansk" by Boris Korneev, "A Girl on construction" by Boris Lavrenko, "Portrait of a locomotive driver Smirnov" by Anatoli Levitin, "A. Illarionov, a worker of the Kirov plant" by Oleg Lomakin, "Portrait of milkmaid P. Kruglova", "Portrait of Kukin, veteran of Great Patriotic War" by Dmitry Maevsky, "Mounter girl" by Boris Maluev, "Country postman" by Mikhail Natarevich, "Portrait of Shepherd with her granddaughter" by Vera Nazina, "Geologist Kiseleva" by Yuri Neprintsev, "Portrait of minder Nina Mymova" by Samuil Nevelshtein, "Fisherwoman from the Ladoga Lake" by Yuri Pavlov, "Polina Shabrova, Leningrad subway worker" by Semion Rotnitsky, "Volzhanka" by Gleb Savinov, "Lena factory worker" by Galina Smirnova, "Shaftman Bozhbov" by Yuri Khukhrov, and some others.

Portrait of Youth was presented of "Portrait of Student" by Olga Bogaevskaya, "Family portrait" by Yuri Khukhrov, "At the window" by Maya Kopitseva, "Portrait of Vladimir Sinegubov" by Tatiana Kopnina, "Portrait of student girl" by Elena Kostenko, "Mariners" by Gevork Kotiantz, "Firstborn" by Mikhail Natarevich, "Portrait of student of the Leningrad State University" by Samuil Nevelshtein, "Oleg" by Victor Otiev, "Olga" by Ivan Savenko, "Portrait of the young man" by Alexander Shmidt, "Olga" by Yuri Tulin, "Portrait of son" by Boris Ugarov, "Girl, Lamp, and Bird" by Valery Vatenin, and some others.

Genre painting was presented of "Fishermen" by Nikolai Baskakov, "Apple twig" by Nikolai Brandt, "On the porch" by Vera Nazina, "On the native land of Sergei Yesenin" by Igor Veselkin, "On horses" by Vecheslav Zagonek, and some others.

Landscape and Still life was presented of "Still life with Reproductions", "Still life with Cherries and Strawberries" by Maya Kopitseva, "Donbass", "Spoil tips" by Gavriil Malish, "Ust-Narva" by Boris Maluev, "Vegetables" by Nikolai Pozdneev, "The Night" by Vladimir Sakson, "Haymaking" by Ivan Savenko, "Branches of Apricot" by Elena Skuin, "Mstino Lake", "April" by Nikolai Timkov, "Roses", "In the Garden" by Elena Zhukova, and some others.

Female portrait was presented of "Valentina" by Boris Lavrenko, "Tamara Volkova", "Masha, Khakas woman", "Portrait of T. Tupikova" by Anatoli Levitin, "Female portrait" by Evsey Moiseenko, "A Woman from the Volga River region" by Gleb Savinov, "At Reading" by Alexander Tatarenko, "Ira" by Vitaly Tulenev, "Portrait of wife" by Boris Ugarov, and some others.

== Acknowledgment ==
Exhibition was widely covered in press and in literature on Soviet fine art.

== See also ==
- Fine Art of Leningrad
- Leningrad School of Painting
- 1971 in fine arts of the Soviet Union
- Saint Petersburg Union of Artists
- Socialist realism

== Sources ==
- Наш современник. Выставка произведений ленинградских художников. Каталог. Л., Художник РСФСР, 1972.
- Справочник членов Ленинградской организации Союза художников РСФСР. Л., Художник РСФСР, 1980.
- Художники народов СССР. Биографический словарь. Т.1-4. М., Искусство, 1970–1995.
- Справочник членов Союза художников СССР. Том 1,2. М., Советский художник, 1979.
- Время перемен. Искусство 1960—1985 в Советском Союзе. СПб., Государственный Русский музей, 2006.
- Sergei V. Ivanov. Unknown Socialist Realism. The Leningrad School. Saint Petersburg: NP-Print Edition, 2007. P.388. ISBN 5-901724-21-6, ISBN 978-5-901724-21-7
- Юбилейный Справочник выпускников Санкт-Петербургского академического института живописи, скульптуры и архитектуры имени И. Е. Репина Российской Академии художеств. 1915–2005. Санкт-Петербург, «Первоцвет», 2007.
