= Our Contemporary (Exhibition, 1975) =

1975 Soviet art exhibition

"Our Contemporary" Regional Art Exhibition. Leningrad, 1975. Catalog
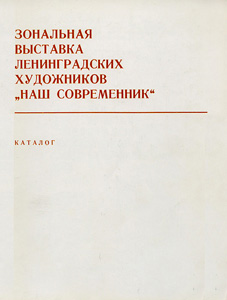
- Year: 1975
- Location: State Russian Museum, Leningrad Union of Soviet Artists; Leningrad

The Regional Art Exhibition "Our Contemporary" (Leningrad, 1975) (Russian: Зональная выставка произведений ленинградских художников "Наш современник" 1975 года) became one of the most important and largest Soviet Art exhibitionz of the 1970s. The exhibition took place in the State Russian Museum and in the exhibition halls of the Leningrad Union of Soviet Artists.

== History and Organization ==
The Regional Art Exhibition "Our Contemporary" opened in the autumn of 1975. The organization and preparation of the Anniversary Exhibition was handled by a specially formed Exhibition Committee which consisted of 45 of the most authoritative art-experts. It published a Catalog of the exhibition. The exhibition displayed works of art of painters, sculptors, graphics, masters of arts and crafts, artists of theater and cinema.

== Contributing Artists ==
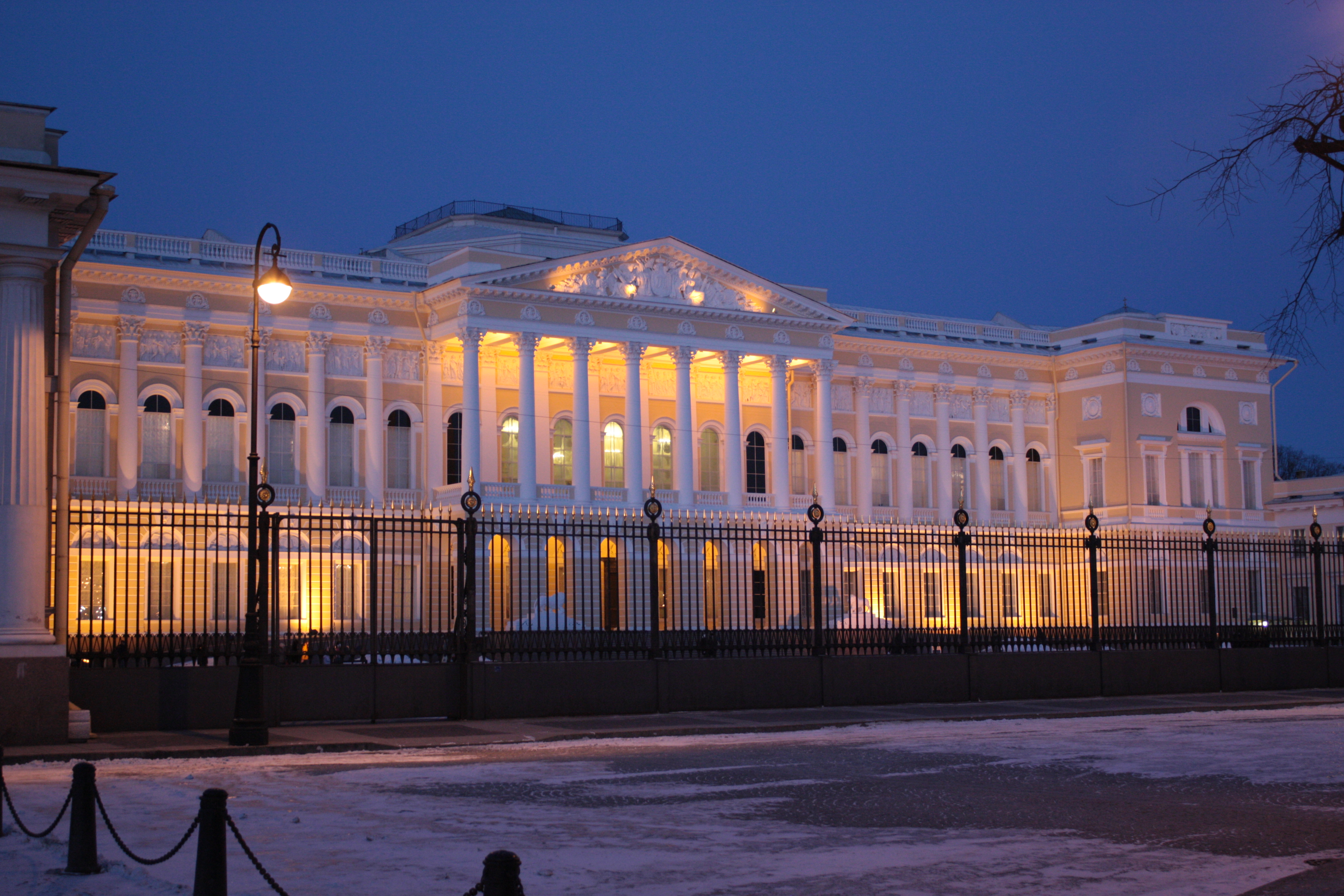
State Russian Museum

In the Department of Painting were exhibited art works of 270 authors. There were Evgenia Antipova, Taisia Afonina, Vsevolod Bazhenov, Irina Baldina, Nikolai Baskakov, Leonid Baykov, Piotr Belousov, Dmitry Belyaev, Olga Bogaevskaya, Veniamin Borisov, Zlata Bizova, Nikolai Brandt, Nikolai Galakhov, Ivan Godlevsky, Vasily Golubev, Elena Gorokhova, Abram Grushko, Irina Dobrekova, German Egoshin, Oleg Eremeev, Alexei Eriomin, Mikhail Kaneev, Yuri Khukhrov, Mikhail Kozell, Marina Kozlovskaya, Engels Kozlov, Maya Kopitseva, Boris Korneev, Elena Kostenko, Nikolai Kostrov, Anna Kostrova, Gevork Kotiantz, Vladimir Krantz, Yaroslav Krestovsky, Boris Lavrenko, Anatoli Levitin, Oleg Lomakin, Dmitry Maevsky, Gavriil Malish, Eugene Maltsev, Yuri Mezhirov, Evsey Moiseenko, Piotr Nazarov, Vera Nazina, Mikhail Natarevich, Yuri Neprintsev, Samuil Nevelshtein, Dmitry Oboznenko, Sergei Osipov, Vladimir Ovchinnikov, Genrikh Pavlovsky, Varlen Pen, Nikolai Pozdneev, Stepan Privedentsev, Alexander Pushnin, Galina Rumiantseva, Kapitolina Rumiantseva, Ivan Savenko, Gleb Savinov, Vladimir Sakson, Alexander Samokhvalov, Arseny Semionov, Alexander Semionov, Yuri Shablikin, Boris Shamanov, Alexander Shmidt, Nadezhda Shteinmiller, Elena Skuin, Galina Smirnova, Alexander Stolbov, Victor Teterin, Nikolai Timkov, Leonid Tkachenko, Mikhail Trufanov, Yuri Tulin, Vitaly Tulenev, Ivan Varichev, Anatoli Vasiliev, Igor Veselkin, Valery Vatenin, Lazar Yazgur, Vecheslav Zagonek, Alexander Zaytsev, Elena Zhukova, Repin Nikolai, and others most prominent painters of the Leningrad School.

Art works of 136 sculptors were exhibited in the Department of Sculptures and creations of 182 artists were presented in the Department of Graphics.

== Contributed Artworks ==
Art works created in years of 1974–1975, and also only some earlier works were selected for the exhibition. They were all being exhibited for the first time. Some of them were subsequently found in the collections of leading Soviet Art museums, as well as domestic and foreign galleries and collectors.

Historical genre was presented of "Homecoming" by Boris Korneev, "Lenin. A Dawn" by Anatoli Levitin, "The Beginning", "Liberation" by Eugene Maltsev, "Youth Drives Us" by Evsey Moiseenko, "A Duel" by Dmitry Oboznenko, "June of 1941" by Boris Ugarov and some others.

Portrait genre was presented of "Portrait of A. Grebenuk" by Taisia Afonina, "Old Nganasanian", "A Guy from Dudinka", "Workers of Kirov Plant" by Nikolai Baskakov, "Famous worker Lebedev and his brigade", "Portrait of Eugenia Belousova" by Piotr Belousov, "Portrait of Nikolay Urvantsev" by Dmitry Belyaev, "Katya", "Fedia" by Olga Bogaevskaya, "Friends" by Elena Kostenko, "Portrait of People's Artist of Russia I.A. Kolpakova" by Anatoli Levitin, "Portrait of a tractor driver Matvienko" by Oleg Lomakin, "Portrait of a tractor driver Filayev" by Dmitry Maevsky, "Portrait of novelist Fiodor Abramov" by Eugene Maltsev, "Military Patrol" by Mikhail Natarevich, "A Native Home" by Alexei Eremin, "Memory" by Lia Ostrova, "My Grandmother" by Galina Rumiantseva, "A Boy with a White Jacket" by Alexander Shmidt, "Portrait of artist Nathan Altman", "Granddaughter" by Anatoli Vasiliev, "Mayorova, Ryazan farmer" by Igor Veselkin, and some others.

Genre painting was presented of "A Youth" by Irina Baldina, "A Holiday on the ship" by Leonid Baykov, "Conquered peaks" by Dmitry Belyaev, "On the Sea shore" by Olga Bogaevskaya, "To Build New Citiies" by Piotr Buchkin, "Conversation" by Irina Dobrekova, "Masters of Dymkovo toys" by German Egoshin, "Men at sea" by Oleg Eremeev, "Fathers and Sons", "In his native home" by Eremin Alexei, "For Water" by Elena Gorokhova, "Summer games" by Maya Kopitseva, "Oilers of Pechora" by Engels Kozlov, "Assemblers", "Turbine construction works" by Yaroslav Krestovsky, "Mechanizers" by Boris Lavrenko, "After the war" by Eugene Maltsev, "Before the Speech" by Vera Nazina, "To the First Ring Feast" by Samuil Nevelshtein, "Solidarity" by Yuri Neprintsev, "Youth, on the Volga River" by Sergei Osipov, "Concert on the Field" by Yuri Pavlov, "In Children Art Studio" by Kapitolina Rumiantseva, "A Day of Victory" by Gleb Savinov, "A Favourite Profession. Flower growers" by Elena Skuin, "Cranes" by Vitaly Tulenev, "Indian summer" by Valery Vatenin, "Grand Plans" by Igor Veselkin, "In Fishermen's farm on the North" by Alexander Zaytsev, "Neva River and Construction cranes" by Elena Zhukova, and some others.

Landscape and Cityscape was presented of "Spring has came[sic]", "Evening in the Gulf" by Vsevolod Bazhenov, "In the new district of city" by Dmitry Belyaev, "A Field is Ploughed" by Veniamin Borisov, "On the arable land" by Nikolai Brandt, "Leaning Tower of Pisa", "On the Petrograd side" by German Egoshin, "St Varvara's wooden church in Yandomozero village in Karelia", "In October" by Alexei Eriomin, "A White Night in Karelia", "On the shore of the White Sea", "Sunday in Leningrad" by Nikolai Galakhov, "A River in Kislovodsk" by Ivan Godlevsky, "Spring Brook", "A Summer" by Vasily Golubev, "April in Karelia", "Esino village", "A Morning" by Abram Grushko, "Winter Landscape", "Leningrad. Kirovsky Bridge" by Mikhail Kaneev, "Boats in Murmansk sea port" by Boris Korneev, "Nevsky Prospect near Gostiny Dvor" by Victor Korovin, "In the Evening" by Mikhail Kozell, "A Fortress in Old Ladoga", "Northern village" by Marina Kozlovskaya, "Dam on Msta river" by Vladimir Krantz, "A Port of Novorossiysk" by Gavriil Malish, "A Storm" by Andrei Mylnikov, "A White Night" by Yaroslav Nikolaev, "On the Volga River" by Vladimir Ovchinnikov, "The Buildings" by Nikolai Pozdneev, "Birdhouses" by Vladimir Sakson, "Old Putilovs storehouse" by Arseny Semionov, "A Middle of Summer" by Kim Slavin, "Autumn Landscape", "February", "Snowing Field" by Nikolai Timkov, "Autumn", "A Village", "Spring has come" by Ivan Varichev, "Frosty Morning", "Willows by the brook", "On the fields close to the Ladoga Lake", "Chernavino village in Autumn" by Vecheslav Zagonek, "Twilights" by Alexander Zaytsev, "A District of new construction", "Close to the Leningrad. Willows over the lake" by Elena Zhukova, and some others.

Still life paintings was presented of "Still life in the Garden", "Still life under birches", "Still Life with Cornflowers and Bread" by Evgenia Antipova, "Flowers and Fruits" by Nikolai Brandt, "Green Still Life" by Gevork Kotiantz, "Still Life with a Mandolin" by Evsey Moiseenko, "Cornflowers. Green Rye" by Boris Shamanov, "Pineapples" by Yuri Mezhirov, "Red Poppies" by Viktor Teterin, "Eastern Stil-life" by Valentina Rakhina and some others.

== Acknowledgment ==
The Regional Art Exhibition "Our Contemporary" of 1975 was widely covered in Soviet press and in literature specialized at Soviet fine art.

== See also ==
- Fine Art of Leningrad
- Soviet art
- 1975 in fine arts of the Soviet Union
- Leningrad School of Painting
- Saint Petersburg Union of Artists
- Socialist realism

== Sources ==
- Губарев А. На полотнах - человек труда. Выставка «Наш современник» // Ленинградский рабочий, 1975, 11 октября.
- Дмитренко А. Мир современника // Ленинградская правда, 1975, 12 октября.
- Богданов А. О людях труда // Вечерний Ленинград, 1975, 3 ноября.
- Аникушин М. Создавать произведения, созвучные эпохе // Ленинградская правда, 1976, 9 января.
- Леняшин В. Думая о будущем. Время. Художник. Творчество // Вечерний Ленинград, 1976, 26 января.
- Яковлева Л. Четвёртая зональная выставка. Ленинград. 1975. Живопись. Л., Художник РСФСР, 1976
- Зональная выставка произведений ленинградских художников "Наш современник". 1975 год. Л., Художник РСФСР, 1980.
- Справочник членов Ленинградской организации Союза художников РСФСР. Л., Художник РСФСР, 1980.
- Художники народов СССР. Биобиблиографический словарь. Т.1-4. М., Искусство, 1970-1995.
- Справочник членов Союза художников СССР. Т.1,2. М., Советский художник, 1979.
- Дмитренко А. Зональные (региональные) и республиканские выставки в художественной жизни России 1960-1980-х годов // Время перемен. Искусство 1960—1985 в Советском Союзе. СПб., Государственный Русский музей, 2006. С.31-33. ISBN 5-93332-199-0.
- Хроника узловых событий художественной жизни России 1960-1980-х годов // Time for Change. The Art of 1960–1985 in the Soviet Union. Saint Petersburg, State Russian Museum, 2006.
- Time for Change. The Art of 1960-1985 in the Soviet Union. Saint Petersburg, State Russian Museum, 2006. P.378.
- Sergei V. Ivanov. Unknown Socialist Realism. The Leningrad School. Saint Petersburg: NP-Print Edition, 2007. P.398. ISBN 5-901724-21-6, ISBN 978-5-901724-21-7
- Юбилейный Справочник выпускников Санкт-Петербургского академического института живописи, скульптуры и архитектуры имени И. Е. Репина Российской Академии художеств. 1915–2005. СПб., Первоцвет, 2007.
- Яковлева Л. Я прожила интересную жизнь, как хотела. СПб, Петрополь, 2010 С.68-73.
- Дмитренко А.Творчество Ленинградских художников в контексте зональных выставок 1960-1980-х гг. Краткий экскурс // 80 лет Санкт-Петербургскому Союзу художников. СПб, 2012. С.10-11.
