= Exhibition of Leningrad artists (Russian Museum, 1960) =

Soviet art exhibition

Exhibition of Leningrad artists of 1960. Catalog
- Year: 1960
- Location: State Russian Museum; Leningrad

Exhibition of Leningrad artists of 1960 (Russian: "Выставка произведений ленинградских художников 1960 года") become one of the largest Soviet Art Exhibition of 1960 year. The Exhibition took place in State Russian Museum.

== History and Organization ==
For the organization and preparation of Exhibition of 1960 was formed specially Exhibition Committee which consisted of 49 the most authoritative art-experts. Exhibition Catalog was published. In total, the Exhibition displayed almost 950 works of art of painters, sculptors, graphics, artists of theater and cinema, masters of arts and crafts. At whole Exhibition attended over 600 artists of the Leningrad.

== Contributing Artists ==
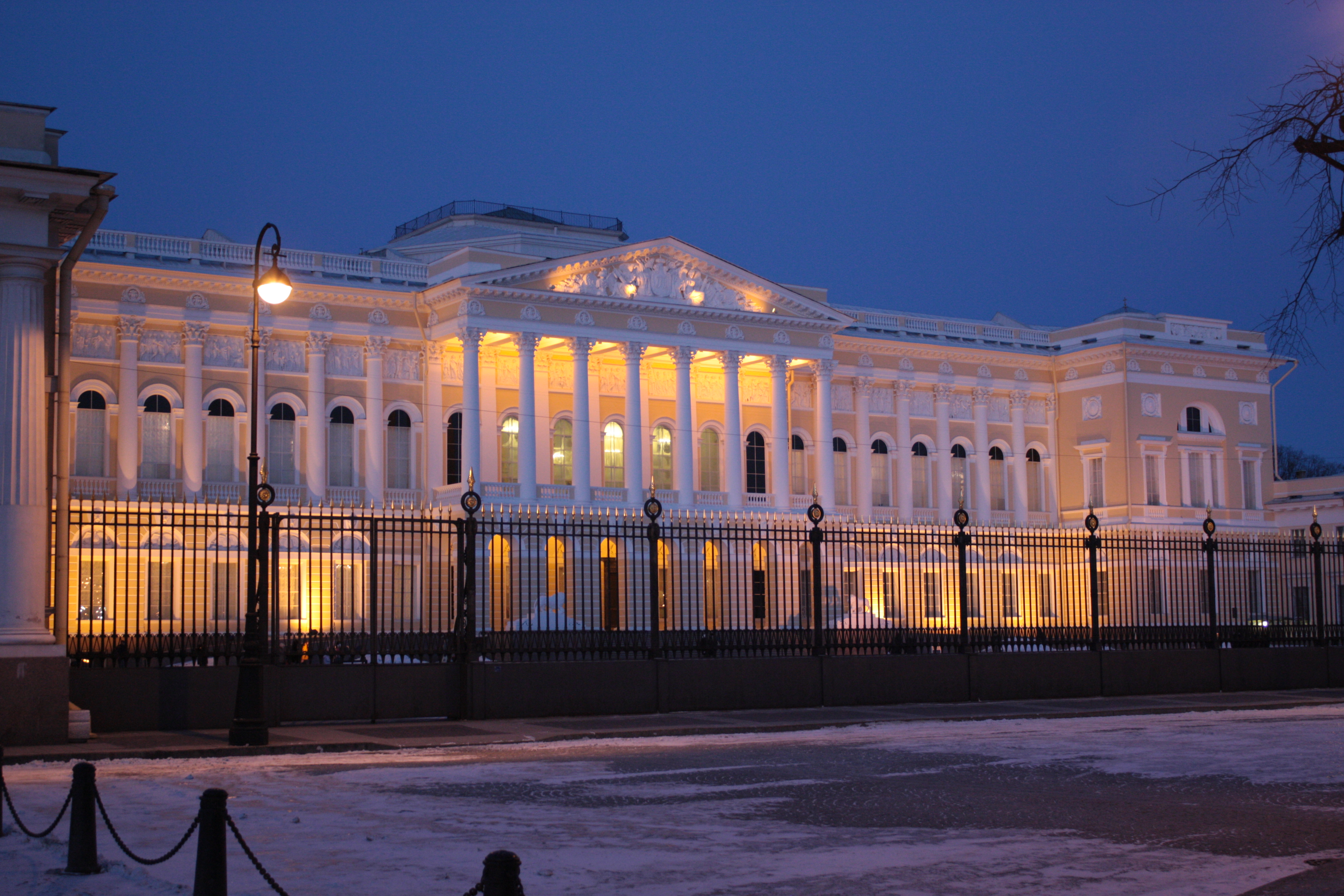
State Russian Museum

In the largest Department of Painting were exhibited art works of 295 authors. There were Piotr Alberti, Evgenia Antipova, Taisia Afonina, Vsevolod Bazhenov, Irina Baldina, Nikolai Baskakov, Leonid Baykov, Yuri Belov, Piotr Belousov, Zlata Bizova, Mikhail Bobyshov, Olga Bogaevskaya, Lev Bogomolets, Nikolai Brandt, Dmitry Buchkin, Piotr Buchkin, Vladimir Chekalov, Sergei Frolov, Nikolai Galakhov, Ivan Godlevsky, Vladimir Gorb, Elena Gorokhova, Abram Grushko, Oleg Eremeev, Alexei Eriomin, Mikhail Kaneev, Engels Kozlov, Marina Kozlovskaya, Tatiana Kopnina, Maya Kopitseva, Boris Korneev, Alexander Koroviakov, Elena Kostenko, Nikolai Kostrov, Anna Kostrova, Gevork Kotiantz, Vladimir Krantz, Yaroslav Krestovsky, Valeria Larina, Boris Lavrenko, Ivan Lavsky, Anatoli Levitin, Piotr Litvinsky, Oleg Lomakin, Dmitry Maevsky, Gavriil Malish, Evsey Moiseenko, Nikolai Mukho, Andrei Mylnikov, Vera Nazina, Mikhail Natarevich, Anatoli Nenartovich, Samuil Nevelshtein, Dmitry Oboznenko, Vladimir Ovchinnikov, Vecheslav Ovchinnikov, Sergei Osipov, Filaret Pakun, Genrikh Pavlovsky, Varlen Pen, Nikolai Pozdneev, Stepan Privedentsev, Alexander Pushnin, Lev Russov, Galina Rumiantseva, Maria Rudnitskaya, Ivan Savenko, Vladimir Sakson, Gleb Savinov, Alexander Samokhvalov, Alexander Semionov, Arseny Semionov, Yuri Shablikin, Boris Shamanov, Alexander Shmidt, Nadezhda Shteinmiller, Elena Skuin, Galina Smirnova, Alexander Sokolov, Alexander Stolbov, Victor Teterin, Nikolai Timkov, Mikhail Tkachev, Leonid Tkachenko, Mikhail Trufanov, Yuri Tulin, Boris Ugarov, Ivan Varichev, Anatoli Vasiliev, Valery Vatenin, Nina Veselova, Rostislav Vovkushevsky, German Yegoshin, Vecheslav Zagonek, Sergei Zakharov, Ruben Zakharian, Elena Zhukova, and others most prominent painters of the Leningrad School.

In the Department of Sculptures were exhibited art works of 149 sculptors. Department of graphics presented a creation of 117 artists.

== Contributed Artworks ==
For the Exhibition were selected art works created in 1959–1960, also some earlier works. All they were exhibited in the first time. Some of them were subsequently found in the collections of Soviet Art museums, as well as domestic and foreign galleries and collectors.

Historical painting was presented of "Homecoming" by Zlata Bizova, "Victory Salute in Moscow" by Mikhail Bobyshov, "Melodies Caucasus" by Nikolai Brandt, "A Letter from Motherland" by Vladimir Chekalov, "Sons of the Russia" by Oleg Eremeev, "Rummage" by Mikhail Kaneev, "Lenin and Komsomols" by Marc Klionsky, "In 1941 year", "Missing in action" by Boris Lavrenko, "Private soldier of October Revolution" by Anatoli Levitin, "Listen to Lenin" by Piotr Litvinsky, "A new host" by Oleg Lomakin, "Seeing" by Galina Rumiantseva, "Spring of the Great Break" by Alexander Sokolov, "Appeal of Hiroshima" by Leonid Tkachenko, "Tale about Siege of Leningrad" by Yuri Tulin, "Stepan Razin", "The Builders of the Volkhov Hydroelectric Station" by Boris Ugarov, "In the mansion of Mathilde Kschessinska" by Anatoli Vasiliev, "Where is the truth?" by Nina Veselova, and others.

Portrait was presented of "Natasha", "Girl on the stone" by Irina Baldina, "Governess" by Nikolai Baskakov, "Portrait of A. Belova" by Yuri Belov, "Portrait of Daughter" by Olga Bogaevskaya, "Portrait of sculptor Igor Krestovsky", "Portrait of actress Alexandra Zavialova" by Piotr Buchkin, "Ship Repairers" by Engels Kozlov, "Portrait of a factory worker N. Shilina" by Marina Kozlovskaya, "A Workwoman", "Katya Baltina, from a team of workers finishers" by Boris Korneev, "Portrait of A. Shennikov, academician" by Elena Kostenko, "Portrait of Scientist", "Portrait of V. Rudenko, worker of Kirov Plant" by Valeria Larina, "A Loader", "Portrait of N. Laskovskaya" by Anatoli Levitin, "Miner", "Portrait of actor Leonid Vivien", "Female portrait", "Young Mainer", "A Head of Miner", "Portrait of student" by Mikhail Trufanov, "Portrait of Dombrovsky, diver of the Baltic Fleet" by Anatoli Vasiliev, "Mikhail Dolgov, chairman of the kolkhoz" by Nina Veselova, and others.

Genre painting was presented of "Asphalting" by Piotr Alberti, "At the St Peter and Paul Fortress" by Evgenia Antipova, "Spring in kolkhoz", "Return of the Herd" by Leonid Baykov, "From school to the work" by Nikolai Baskakov, "Launching of the tanker "Beijing"" by Vsevolod Bazhenov, "Guests" by Olga Bogaevskaya, "Fishermen's Island" by Lev Bogomolets, "Grain growers" by Piotr Buchkin, "On the roads of Karelia" by Nikolai Galakhov, "Farewell" by Elena Gorokhova, "Enthusiasts" by Oleg Eremeev, "Geologists" by Alexei Eriomin, "Girls" by Tatiana Kopnina, "Three" by Maya Kopitseva, "Development of the North" by Boris Korneev, "The Factory district", "Kindergarten" by Alexander Koroviakov, "To the new edge" by Anatoli Levitin, "Quiet time" by Galina Rumiantseva, "Timber rafting in Arkhangelsk", "Timber Storage" by Yuri Shablikin, "Forging shop" by Nadezhda Shteinmiller, "Road Builders" by Victor Teterin, "Here will be a road" by Mikhail Tkachev, "Seamstresses" by Valery Vatenin, "Spring of drivers" by Nina Veselova, and others.

Landscape and Cityscape were presented of "Blue Night", "After the rain" by Taisia Afonina, "Neva industrial" by Vsevolod Bazhenov, "Kirov Stadium in Leningrad", "Moscow Kremlin in winter" by Mikhail Bobyshov, "A Morning", "Storm" by Lev Bogomolets, "Summer Morning" by Nikolai Brandt, "Summer" by Dmitry Buchkin, "Northern Spring", "A Village in Siberia" by Nikolai Galakhov, "On the Volkhov River", "Rostov The Great", "Bridge over Velikaya River" by Ivan Godlevsky, "In South-East Crimea", "Crimea. At the old brook" by Vladimir Gorb, "April Day" by Abram Grushko, "Lanskoy Highway" by Marina Kozlovskaya, "After the rain" by Vladimir Krantz, "At the Vasilievsky Island" by Yaroslav Krestovsky, "On the Neva River" by Ivan Lavsky, "Boats on the shore" by Yuri Shablikin, "Summer Garden in October" by Alexander Shmidt, "Spring in the Garden", "White Night in Khibiny" by Boris Shamanov, "Twilight", "Winter day", "Bridge over canal", "Yacht-club" by Nadezhda Shteinmiller, "Circus in Winter" by Alexander Stolbov, "In Sunny Day" by Victor Teterin, "Mach Sun", "Early Spring", "Aspen in winter", "Turns green", "Evening. The Lilac hour", "October. The First Snow" by Nikolai Timkov, "Park" by Yuri Tulin, "First Snow", "Herd", "A Village on the Angara River", "Baykal Lake" by Ivan Varichev, "A Midday", "After the rain", "Novgorod evening" by Rostislav Vovkushevsky, "Krukov Canal in Leningrad", "Moyka River" by German Yegoshin, "Morning", "Baykal motive", "On the shore of Angara River" by Vecheslav Zagonek, "Spring on Malaya Okhta", "On the Msta River", "Winter" by Sergei Zakharov, "Yachts at a mooring", "Yachts go to the Seaside" by Elena Zhukova, and others.

Still life paintings were presented of "Still life" by Evgenia Antipova, "Karelian Still life" by Irina Baldina, "Still life" by Olga Bogaevskaya, "Oranges, Lemons, and Pineapple" by Vladimir Gorb, "Young Apple Tree", "Bananas", "Potato. Still life", "Autumn Bird Cherry", "Tea-table" by Maya Kopitseva, "Wildflowers", "Quince and Grapes", "Apple-tree branch", "Autumn Bouquet", "Peaches and melons" by Victor Teterin, "Red and White flowers" by Nina Veselova, "Gifts of the land" by Rostislav Vovkushevsky, "Still life" by Ruben Zakharian, "Still life" by Sergei Zakharov, and others.

== Acknowledgment ==
Exhibition of the Leningrad artists of 1960 was widely covered in press and in literature on Soviet fine art.

== See also ==
- Fine Art of Leningrad
- Leningrad School of Painting
- 1960 in fine arts of the Soviet Union
- Saint Petersburg Union of Artists
- Socialist realism

== Sources ==
- Выставка произведений ленинградских художников 1960 года. Л., Художник РСФСР, 1961.
- Борис Васильевич Корнеев. Каталог выставки произведений. Автор вст. ст. Н. Г. Леонова. Л., Художник РСФСР, 1975. С.6, 15, 20, 37.
- Справочник членов Ленинградской организации Союза художников РСФСР. Л., Художник РСФСР, 1980.
- Художники народов СССР. Биобиблиографический словарь. Т.1-4. М., Искусство, 1970–1995.
- Справочник членов Союза художников СССР. Т.1-2. М., Советский художник, 1979.
- Олег Леонидович Ломакин. Автор вст. ст. Н. Г. Моисеева. Л., Художник РСФСР, 1991. С.17, 43.
- Хроника узловых событий художественной жизни России 1960-1980-х годов // Time for Change. The Art of 1960–1985 in the Soviet Union. Saint Petersburg, State Russian Museum, 2006.
- Sergei V. Ivanov. Unknown Socialist Realism. The Leningrad School. Saint Petersburg, NP-Print Edition, 2007. P.393, 416, 442. ISBN 5-901724-21-6, ISBN 978-5-901724-21-7
- Юбилейный Справочник выпускников Санкт-Петербургского академического института живописи, скульптуры и архитектуры имени И. Е. Репина Российской Академии художеств. 1915—2005. Санкт Петербург, «Первоцвет», 2007.
- Левитин А., Тригалёва Н. Портрет художника на фоне эпохи. СПб., Левша, 2014. С.137-141.
