= Annual Exhibition of Leningrad artists (1960) =

Soviet art exhibition

Annual Exhibition of Leningrad Artists. 1960. Catalog
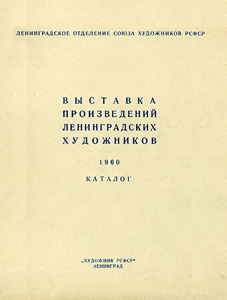
- Year: 1960
- Location: Leningrad Union of Artists Exhibition Halls; Leningrad

Annual Exhibition of Leningrad artists (Leningrad, 1960) (Russian: "Выставка произведений ленинградских художников 1960 года") become one of the largest Soviet Art Exhibition of 1960 year. The Exhibition took place in Leningrad Union of Soviet Artists Exhibition Halls on Bolshaya Morskaya st. 38.

== History and Organization ==
For the organization and preparation of the Annual Art Exhibition of 1960 was formed specially Exhibition Committee which consisted of the most authoritative art-experts. Exhibition Catalog was published. In total, the Exhibition displayed almost 650 works of art of painters, sculptors, graphics, artists of theater and cinema, masters of arts and crafts. In total exhibition attended by 300 artists of the Leningrad.

== Contributing Artists ==
In the largest Department of Painting were exhibited art works of 167 authors. There were Taisia Afonina, Piotr Alberti, Evgenia Antipova, Genrikh Bagrov, Leonid Baykov, Vsevolod Bazhenov, Nikolai Baskakov, Zlata Bizova, Olga Bogaevskaya, Lev Bogomolets, Nikolai Galakhov, Vladimir Gorb, Abram Grushko, German Egoshin, Alexei Eriomin, Mikhail Kaneev, Maria Kleschar-Samokhvalova, Boris Korneev, Alexander Koroviakov, Victor Korovin, Elena Kostenko, Nikolai Kostrov, Anna Kostrova, Gevork Kotiantz, Mikhail Kozell, Marina Kozlovskaya, Yaroslav Krestovsky, Boris Lavrenko, Ivan Lavsky, Oleg Lomakin, Dmitry Maevsky, Vladimir Malevsky, Alexei Mozhaev, Evsey Moiseenko, Nikolai Mukho, Andrei Mylnikov, Piotr Nazarov, Vera Nazina, Mikhail Natarevich, Samuil Nevelshtein, Dmitry Oboznenko, Sergei Osipov, Lia Ostrova, Filaret Pakun, Varlen Pen, Boris Petrov, Nikolai Pozdneev, Stepan Privedentsev, Valentina Rakhina, Semion Rotnitsky, Maria Rudnitskaya, Vladimir Sakson, Alexander Samokhvalov, Ivan Savenko, Alexander Semionov, Arseny Semionov, Yuri Shablikin, Boris Shamanov, Alexander Shmidt, Elena Skuin, Alexander Sokolov, Alexander Stolbov, Victor Teterin, Nikolai Timkov, Yuri Tulin, Boris Ugarov, Ivan Varichev, Rostislav Vovkushevsky, Vecheslav Zagonek, Ruben Zakharian, Elena Zhukova, and others most prominent painters of the Leningrad School.

In the Department of Sculptures were exhibited art works of 44 sculptors. Department of graphics presented a creation of 84 artists.

== Contributed Artworks ==
For the Exhibition were selected art works created in 1959-1960, also some earlier works. All they were exhibited in the first time. Some of them were subsequently found in the collections of Soviet Art museums, as well as domestic and foreign galleries and collectors.

Portrait was presented of "Grandmother with a granddaughter" by Nikolai Baskakov, "Verochka" by Maria Kleschar-Samokhvalova, "Misha", "Katenka" by Elena Kostenko, "Portrait of wife with daughter" by Gevork Kotiantz, "A worker of rolling mill" by Dmitry Maevsky, "Natasha", "Portrait of artist Vasily Meshkov", "Portrait of Wife" by Evsey Moiseenko, "Verochka at the window" by Andrei Mylnikov, "Nadenka" by Vera Nazina, "Schoolboy" by Samuil Nevelshtein, "Portrait of Partisan" by Semion Rotnitsky, "Tonia" by Boris Ugarov, "Portrait of a woman - worker of Publishing" by Ruben Zakharian, and others.

Genre painting was presented of "Crossing" by Nikolai Galakhov, "At the stables" by Abram Grushko, "Camp of geologists" by Alexei Eriomin, "On the Neva River" by Ivan Lavsky, "Pig farm workers", "Lunch break" by Oleg Lomakin, "Construction" by Nikolai Mukho, "At the breakfast", "In Studio" by Andrei Mylnikov, "Rendezvous", "In a walk" by Mikhail Natarevich, "Whistle-stop" by Samuil Nevelshtein, "Wharf in Kizhi Pogost" by Dmitry Oboznenko, "Winter camp on the Neva River" by Boris Petrov, "Cafe Gurzuf", "At the Seaside highway" by Alexander Samokhvalov, "Port in the night" by Yuri Shablikin, "Smoke of the Magnitogorsk steel plant" by Alexander Sokolov, "A Summer" by Victor Teterin, "Gold fields of Artyomovsk", "The City is under construction" by Yuri Tulin, "Tonia" by and others.

Landscape and Cityscape were presented of "On the Zhdanovka River" by Taisia Afonina, "On the Senezh Lake" by Piotr Alberti, "Northern wind", "A Shore of the lake", "A Village of Tarasy" by Leonid Baykov, "Twilight", "In the Wood" by Vsevolod Bazhenov, "A Spring" by Zlata Bizova, "Evening Sky" by Lev Bogomolets, "Small Courtyard" by Vladimir Gorb, "In Spring", "February" by Abram Grushko, "Etude", "Old courtyard" by German Egoshin, "October", "Northern etude", "Forest Lake" by Alexei Eriomin, "Leningrad courtyard" by Mikhail Kaneev, "Twilight", "By the evening" by Boris Korneev, "Kronverksky Strait" by Alexander Koroviakov, "Yaroslavl. A View from the Spassky monastery" by Victor Korovin, "Winter etude" by Mikhail Kozell, "Evening", "Karelian landscape", "Highway" by Marina Kozlovskaya, "Old houses" by Yaroslav Krestovsky, "Chernaya River" by Ivan Lavsky, "Summer cottage" by Oleg Lomakin, "In the Spring", "Koktebel" by Evsey Moiseenko, "Autumn Park" by Alexei Mozhaev, "Venice" by Andrei Mylnikov, "A Winter" by Piotr Nazarov, "A First snow" by Samuil Nevelshtein, "Kizhi Pogost", "Wharf in Kizhi" by Dmitry Oboznenko, "Little Bridge", "Autumn in the city", "Boats", "On the Volkhov River" by Sergei Osipov, "Spring" by Lia Ostrova, "A Field", "Over the Dnieper River", "Walkway" by Filaret Pakun, "Close to Yalu River" by Varlen Pen, "In spring at the Summer Garden" by Boris Petrov, "Spring etude", "House close to the road" by Nikolai Pozdneev, "Old Petergof" by Stepan Privedentsev, "Teracce" by Valentina Rakhina, "A Path" by Maria Rudnitskaya, "Street in Angarsk" by Vladimir Sakson, "September on the Ural Mountains" by Ivan Savenko, "After the rain" by Alexander Semionov, "Spring theme", "Factory motive", "Fontanka River", "Trinity Cathedral, Saint Petersburg" by Arseny Semionov, "Severodvinsk. Backwater" by Yuri Shablikin, "Willow in bloom" by Boris Shamanov, "Last Snow" by Vasily Sokolov, "In the Novgorod Province" by Alexander Stolbov, "Winter landscape with small rugs" by Victor Teterin, "First snow", "Cherry in bloom" by Nikolai Timkov, "Abandoned gold fields" by Yuri Tulin, "Venice", "A Winter", "Pskov" by Boris Ugarov, "Autumn" by Ivan Varichev, "Baykal Lake", "Snow goes", "After the rain", "Shore of Angara River" by Vecheslav Zagonek, "Black Sea. Rocky shore", "Evening silence" by Elena Zhukova, and others.

Still life paintings were presented of "Irises", "Wildflower Bouquet" by Evgenia Antipova, "Interior", "Still life" by Olga Bogaevskaya, "Still life" by Gevork Kotiantz, "Still life" by Mikhail Natarevich, "Mushrooms" by Maria Rudnitskaya, "In the garden" by Boris Shamanov, "Fruits. Still life" by Elena Skuin, "Still life with Melon" by Vasily Sokolov, "Snowdrops and lemons", "Rosehip" by Victor Teterin, "A Winter Still life" by Rostislav Vovkushevsky, and others.

== Acknowledgment ==
Annual Exhibition of the Leningrad artists of 1960 was widely covered in press and in literature on Soviet fine art.

== See also ==
- Fine Art of Leningrad
- Leningrad School of Painting
- 1960 in fine arts of the Soviet Union
- Saint Petersburg Union of Artists
- Socialist realism

== Sources ==
- Выставка произведений ленинградских художников 1960 года. Каталог. Л., Художник РСФСР, 1963.
- Мочалов, Л. В. О чём говорит выставка // Творчество. Вып.2. М., 1961, с.4 – 6
- Справочник членов Ленинградской организации Союза художников РСФСР. Л: Художник РСФСР, 1980.
- Художники народов СССР. Биографический словарь. Т.1. М., Искусство, 1970-1995.
- Справочник членов Союза художников СССР. Том 1,2. М., Советский художник, 1979.
- Дмитренко А. Зональные (региональные) и республиканские выставки в художественной жизни России 1960-1980-х годов. // Время перемен. Искусство 1960—1985 в Советском Союзе. СПб., Государственный Русский музей, 2006. С.31-33. ISBN 5-93332-199-0.
- Хроника узловых событий художественной жизни России 1960-1980-х годов // Time for Change. The Art of 1960-1985 in the Soviet Union. Saint Petersburg, State Russian Museum, 2006.
- Sergei V. Ivanov. Unknown Socialist Realism. The Leningrad School. Saint Petersburg, NP-Print Edition, 2007. P.392-393, 413-414. ISBN 5-901724-21-6, ISBN 978-5-901724-21-7
- Юбилейный Справочник выпускников Санкт-Петербургского академического института живописи, скульптуры и архитектуры имени И. Е. Репина Российской Академии художеств. 1915—2005. Санкт Петербург, «Первоцвет», 2007.
