= 1933 in fine arts of the Soviet Union =

The year 1933 was marked by many events that left an imprint on the history of Soviet and Russian Fine Arts.

== Events ==
- The Exhibition of Portrait painting was opened in March in the Russian museum in Leningrad. Exhibited works of 76 authors. The participants were Isaak Brodsky, Pavel Filonov, Nikolai Kostrov, Mikhail Platunov, Victoria Belakovskaya, and other important contemporary soviet artists.
- April 2 — The Soviet government approved the «Regulations of the All-Russian Academy of Fine Arts».
- June 27 — Exhibition named «Artists of the RSFSR for the 15 years. 1917-1932» was opened in Moscow in the halls of the Historical Museum. This exhibition was shown a year earlier in Leningrad in the Russian museum.
- June 30 — Exhibition named «15 Years of Workers and Peasants Red Army» was opened in Moscow in the Central Park of Culture and Leisure. The participants were Isaak Brodsky, Piotr Buchkin, Boris Ioganson, Dmitry Kardovsky, Rudolf Frentz, Sergey Gerasimov, Alexander Savinov, Nikolai Dormidontov, Alexander Lubimov, Victor Oreshnikov, and other important contemporary soviet artists.
- Was founded Voronezh Fine Art museum named after Ivan Kramskoy.

== Births ==
- January 27 — Valery Vatenin (Russian: Ватенин Валерий Владимирович), Russian Soviet painter (died 1977).
- February 7 — Yuri Mezhirov (Russian: Межиров Юрий Александрович), Russian Soviet painter, People's Artist of the Russian Federation.
- February 19 — Elena Gorokhova (Russian: Горохова Елена Константиновна), Russian Soviet painter.
- October 5 — Erik Bulatov (Russian: Булатов Эрик Владимирович), Russian Soviet artist, one of the founder of Sots Art.
- December 2 — Georgy Kovenchuk (Russian: Гага (Георгий Васильевич) Ковенчук, Soviet and Russian artist and writer.

== Deaths ==
- January 23 — Apollinary Vasnetsov, Russian painter and graphic artist specialized in scenes from the medieval history of Moscow (born 1856).
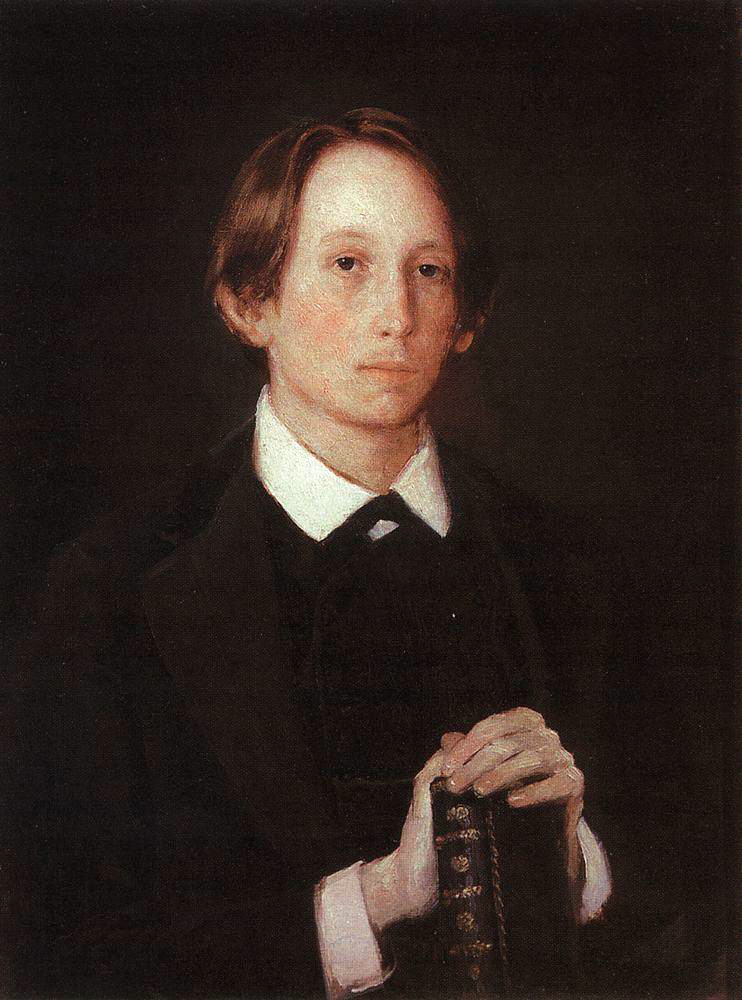
Apollinary Vasnetsov

== See also ==
- List of Russian artists
- List of painters of Leningrad Union of Artists
- Saint Petersburg Union of Artists
- Russian culture
- 1933 in the Soviet Union

== Sources ==
- Каталог выставки картин ленинградского областного Дома художников в Доме культуры имени 1-й Пятилетки. Л., Изд. Обл. Дома художников, 1933.
- Каталог выставки портрета. Л., Рабис, 1933.
- Художественная выставка «XV лет РККА». М., Всекохудожник, 1933.
- Художественная выставка «XV лет РККА». Живопись, скульптура, графика. Л., ЛССХ, 1933.
- Художники РСФСР за 15 лет. Каталог юбилейной выставки живописи, графики, скульптуры. Л., ГРМ, 1932.
- Artists of Peoples of the USSR. Biobibliography Dictionary. Vol. 1. Moscow, Iskusstvo, 1970.
- Artists of Peoples of the USSR. Biobibliography Dictionary. Vol. 2. Moscow, Iskusstvo, 1972.
- Directory of Members of Union of Artists of USSR. Volume 1,2. Moscow, Soviet Artist Edition, 1979.
- Directory of Members of the Leningrad branch of the Union of Artists of Russian Federation. Leningrad, Khudozhnik RSFSR, 1980.
- Artists of Peoples of the USSR. Biobibliography Dictionary. Vol. 4 Book 1. Moscow, Iskusstvo, 1983.
- Directory of Members of the Leningrad branch of the Union of Artists of Russian Federation. Leningrad, Khudozhnik RSFSR, 1987.
- Персональные и групповые выставки советских художников. 1917-1947 гг. М., Советский художник, 1989.
- Artists of peoples of the USSR. Biobibliography Dictionary. Vol. 4 Book 2. Saint Petersburg: Academic project humanitarian agency, 1995.
- Link of Times: 1932 - 1997. Artists - Members of Saint Petersburg Union of Artists of Russia. Exhibition catalogue. Saint Petersburg, Manezh Central Exhibition Hall, 1997.
- Matthew C. Bown. Dictionary of 20th Century Russian and Soviet Painters 1900-1980s. London, Izomar, 1998.
- Vern G. Swanson. Soviet Impressionism. - Woodbridge, England: Antique Collectors' Club, 2001.
- Sergei V. Ivanov. Unknown Socialist Realism. The Leningrad School. Saint-Petersburg, NP-Print Edition, 2007. ISBN 5901724216, ISBN 9785901724217.
- Anniversary Directory graduates of Saint Petersburg State Academic Institute of Painting, Sculpture, and Architecture named after Ilya Repin, Russian Academy of Arts. 1915 - 2005. Saint Petersburg, Pervotsvet Publishing House, 2007.
