= Horsewoman (Frentz) =

1925 painting by Rudolf Frentz

- Artist: Rudolf R. Frentz
- Year: 1925
- Medium: Oil on canvas
- Dimensions: 89 cm × 89 cm (35 in × 35 in)
- Location: private collection, Russia

Horsewoman is an oil on canvas portrait painting of 1925, by the Russian painter Rudolf Frentz (1888–1956). The picture is a portrait of an equestrian of the artist's wife Catherine Anisimovna (née Stulovskaya).

== History ==
Painted about 1925, the portrait represents a young woman astride on a horse in a suit for riding. In a picturesque and composition relation a portrait exudes between works of artist of 1920th and does not have analogues in collections of the largest Russian Art museums. A portrait is an extraordinarily rare for the soviet painting genre of woman's equestrian portrait.

Horsewoman was first showed on the personal exhibition of Rudolf Frentz in 1928 in Leningrad. In 1970 after a long interruption a portrait was again demonstrated in Leningrad on the exhibition of works of Rudolf Frentz in the Leningrad Union of Artists. In 2007 the painting «Horsewoman» was reproduced and described among 350 art works by Leningrad artists in the book «Unknown Socialist Realism. The Leningrad School», published in Russian and English.

== Sources ==
- Выставка художника Р. Р. Френца. Апрель-май. Каталог. Л., Община художников, 1928.
- Рудольф Рудольфович Френц. Каталог выставки. Л., Художник РСФСР, 1970. С.10.
- Изобразительное искусство Ленинграда. Каталог выставки. Л., Художник РСФСР, 1976. С.33.
- Рудольф Френц. СПб., Государственный Русский музей, 2005. ISBN 5-93332-186-9.
- Sergei Ivanov. Unknown socialist realism. The Leningrad school. Saint-Petersburg, NP—Print, 2007. P.10, 342, 346, 352–353, 372.
- Alexandra Demberger. Damen hoch zu Ross: Vom königlichen Herrscherportrait zum bürgerlichen Adelsportrait. Regensburg, Verlag Friedrich Pustet, 2018.
