= Rudolf Frentz =

Russian painter (1888–1956)

Rudolf Rudolfovich Frentz
- Born: 23 July 1888; Marienburg, Saint Petersburg Governorate, Russia
- Died: 27 December 1956 (aged 68); Leningrad, Soviet Union
- Resting place: Literatorskiye Mostki, Saint Petersburg
- Education: Higher Art School of the Imperial Academy (1918)
- Known for: Painting, drawing, art teaching
- Movement: Realism

Rudolf Rudolfovich Frentz (Russian: Рудо́льф Рудо́льфович Фре́нц; 23 July 1888 – 27 December 1956) was a Russian painter and draughtsman of German descent. He was active in Leningrad during the Soviet era and known for his military subjects.

== Biography ==
Horsewoman, 1925

Frentz was born on 23 July 1888 in Marienburg, a suburb of Saint Petersburg, in Saint Petersburg Governorate of the Russian Empire.

Initially he learned from his father Rudolf Ferdinandovich Frentz (1831–1918), Academic of painting (1912), well-known Russian master of animal and hunting paintings.

In 1918 Rudolf Frentz graduated from Higher Art School at the Imperial Academy of Arts in Saint Petersburg, where he studied noted battle painters Vasily Savinsky and Nikolai Samokysh.

Since 1904 Rudolf Frentz participated in Art Exhibitions. He painted battle scenes, genre and historical paintings, portraits, landscapes, and cityscapes, the most famous being his battle and animal paintings. Among his most famous paintings were ″On Znamenskaya Square in the February days of 1917″ (1917), ″Kryukov Channel″ (1920), ″Still Life″, ″Roadhog″ (both 1921), ″Carousel″ (1922), ″Nevsky Prospekt in the Night. A Cabman″, ″A Folk festivitie″ (both 1923), ″The storming of the Winter Palace″, ″Horsewoman″ (both 1925), ″A Portrait of wife″ (1926), ″The defense of Petrograd from Yudenich″ (1928), ″Sergey Kirov at the May Day Parade″, ″A Workers of the Southern Urals join a Blucher's partisan detachment″ (1929), ″Storm of Kronstadt″ (1935), ″Sergey Kirov in the North Caucasus″, ″Joint actions of tanks, aircraft and cavalry. Combined attack″ (both 1937), ″Mikhail Frunze manages the crossing over Sivash″ (1940), ″Guerrilla paths″ (1947), Stalingrad. February 2, 1943 (1950).

Rudolf Frentz was a founding member of the Leningrad Union of Artists established in 1932. From 1929 to 1956, he taught at the Repin Institute of Arts, where he was professor of painting (1939–1956) and the head of the battle-painting workshop (from 1934). From 1949 to 1956, he also was professor of painting at the Vera Mukhina Institute, also known as the Leningrad Higher School of Industrial Art. Among his pupils were well-known Russian painters Mikhail Kaneev, Vladislav Anisovich, Nikolai Galakhov, Yuri Belov, Stepan Privedentsev, Sergei Babkov, Alexander Koroviakov, Gevork Kotiantz, Boris Lavrenko, Konstantin Molteninov, Dmitry Oboznenko, Vladimir Ovchinnikov, Nikolai Ovchinnikov, Alexander Pushnin, Vladimir Seleznev, Piotr Litvinsky, Piotr Nazarov and Elena Skuin.

Exhibitions of his works have been held in Leningrad (1928, 1970) and Saint Petersburg (2006).

Rudolf Rudolfovich Frentz died in Leningrad on 27 December 1956. His paintings are held in the State Russian Museum, the State Tretyakov Gallery, and in art museums and private collections in Russia, Italy, France, the US, Germany, England, and elsewhere.
