= Leonid Baykov =

Russian painter

Leonid Petrovich Baykov
- Born: 28 July 1919; Vyshny Volochyok, Tver Governorate, RSFSR
- Died: 17 June 1994 (aged 74); Saint Petersburg, Russia
- Education: Repin Institute of Arts
- Known for: Painting
- Movement: Realism
- Awards: Medal for Battle Merit; Order of the Patriotic War; Medal "For the Victory Over Germany"; Medal "For the Defence of the Soviet Transarctic"

Baykov Leonid Petrovich (Russian: Байков, Леонид Петрович; 28 July 1919 — 17 June 1994) was a Russian and Soviet painter, a member of the Leningrad Union of Soviet Artists, who lived and worked in Saint Petersburg (former Leningrad), regarded as one of representatives of the Leningrad School of Painting. Participated in exhibitions since 1943. Important exhibitions: "All-Union Art Exhibition", Moscow, 1951.

== See also ==
- Leningrad School of Painting
- House of creativity «Staraya Ladoga»
- List of Russian artists
- List of 20th-century Russian painters
- List of painters of Saint Petersburg Union of Artists
- Saint Petersburg Union of Artists

== Sources ==
- Центральный Государственный Архив литературы и искусства. СПб. Ф.78. Оп.8. Д.205.
- Весенняя выставка произведений ленинградских художников 1954 года. Каталог. Л., Изогиз, 1954. С.7-8.
- Весенняя выставка произведений ленинградских художников 1955 года. Каталог. Л., ЛССХ, 1956. С.7.
- Осенняя выставка произведений ленинградских художников 1956 года. Каталог. Л., Ленинградский художник, 1958. С.6.
- 1917 — 1957. Выставка произведений ленинградских художников. Каталог. Л., Ленинградский художник, 1958. С.8.
- Осенняя выставка произведений ленинградских художников 1958 года. Каталог. Л., Художник РСФСР, 1959. С.6.
- Выставка произведений ленинградских художников 1960 года. Каталог. Л., Художник РСФСР, 1961. С.9.
- Выставка произведений ленинградских художников 1961 года. Каталог. Л., Художник РСФСР, 1964. С.9.
- Ленинград. Зональная выставка 1964 года. Каталог. Л, Художник РСФСР, 1965. C.9.
- Художники народов СССР. Биобиблиографический словарь. Т. 1. М., Искусство, 1970. С. 260-261.
- Весенняя выставка произведений ленинградских художников. Каталог. - Л: Художник РСФСР, 1974. - с.6.
- Наш современник. Зональная выставка произведений ленинградских художников 1975 года. Каталог. Л., Художник РСФСР, 1980. C.11.
- Выставка произведений ленинградских художников, посвящённая 60-летию Великого Октября. Л., Художник РСФСР, 1982. С.11.
- Directory of Members of the Union of Artists of USSR. Vol. 1. - Moscow: Soviet artist, 1979. P.84.
- Зональная выставка произведений ленинградских художников 1980 года. Каталог. Л., Художник РСФСР, 1983. C.9.
- Directory of members of the Leningrad branch of Union of Artists of Russian Federation. - Leningrad: Khudozhnik RSFSR, 1987. P.10.
- Matthew Cullerne Bown. A Dictionary of Twentieth Century Russian And Soviet Painters. 1900 — 1980s. — London: Izomar Limited, 1998.
- Летописцы флота России. 50 лет Студии художников-маринистов Военно-морского флота. СПб, ЦВММ. 2002. С. 8, 20, 50.
- Sergei V. Ivanov. Unknown Socialist Realism. The Leningrad School. Saint Petersburg, NP-Print Edition, 2007. P.393, 400. ISBN 5-901724-21-6, ISBN 978-5-901724-21-7.
- Юбилейный Справочник выпускников Санкт-Петербургского академического института живописи, скульптуры и архитектуры имени И. Е. Репина Российской Академии художеств. 1915—2005. — Санкт Петербург: «Первоцвет», 2007. — с.67.
