= Vladislav Anisovich =

Russian painter

Vladislav Leopoldovich Anisovich
- Born: 7 June 1908; Lugansk, Slavyanoserbsk uezd, Yekaterinoslav Governorate, Russian Empire
- Died: 30 August 1969 (aged 61); Alupka, USSR
- Education: Repin Institute of Arts
- Known for: Painting, Teaching
- Movement: Realism

Vladislav Leopoldovich Anisovich (Russian: Владислав Леопольдович Анисович) (7 June 1908 in Lugansk – 30 August 1969 in Alupka) was a Russian and Soviet painter and art educator, who lived and worked in Leningrad, a member of the Leningrad Union of Soviet Artists, professor of the Repin Institute of Arts, regarded as one of representatives of the Leningrad School of Painting. Mostly known for his portrait paintings.

== Biography ==
Vladislav Leopoldovich Anisovich was born on 7 June 1908 in the industrial city of Lugansk, in the Yekaterinoslav Governorate of the Russian Empire (present-day Ukraine). In 1927-1928 He studied at the Kharkov Art Institute, then came to Moscow to continue his education in VKHUTEIN. After the closure of VKHUTEIN, Anisovich transferred to the Institute of Proletarian Fine Arts (formerly the Academy of Arts)in Leningrad, where he studied under Rudolf Frentz and Alexander Savinov. In 1931 he graduated from the Institute as an artist of monumental painting.

After graduation Anisovich continued his postgraduate studies at the Institute and received a degree in art history for his historic picture named «The Workers' Uprising in Germany» (The State Russian Museum). In 1935 he began to participate in art exhibitions. He painted portraits, genre and historical composition and landscapes. In 1932 he was one of the founders of the Leningrad Union of Soviet Artists. From 1933 to 1969 he taught at the Repin Institute of Arts.

Vladislav Leopoldovich Anisovich died on 30 August 1969 at the age of 61. His paintings are held in The State Russian Museum, and in galleries, museums and private collections in Russia, Ukraine, Japan, Germany, France, and other countries.

== See also ==
- Fine Art of Leningrad
- Leningrad School of Painting
- List of 20th-century Russian painters
- List of painters of Saint Petersburg Union of Artists
- Saint Petersburg Union of Artists

== Sources ==
- Первая выставка ленинградских художников. Каталог. — Л., 1935. — с.12.
- Выставка произведений ленинградских художников 1951 года. Каталог. — Л: Лениздат, 1951. — с.7.
- 1917 — 1957. Выставка произведений ленинградских художников. Каталог. — Л: Ленинградский художник, 1958. — с.7.
- Художники народов СССР. Биобиблиографический словарь. Т.1. М., Искусство, 1970. — с.159.
- Выставка произведений ленинградских художников, посвященная 60-летию Великого Октября. — Л: Художник РСФСР, 1982. — с.11.
- 40 лет Великой победы. Выставка произведений художников — ветеранов Великой Отечественной войны. Каталог. — Л: Художник РСФСР, 1990. — с.7.
- Государственный Русский музей. Живопись. Первая половина ХХ века. Каталог. А—В. СПб, Palace Editions. 1997. С. 27-28.
- Matthew Cullerne Bown. A Dictionary of Twentieth Century Russian And Soviet Painters. 1900 — 1980s. — London: Izomar Limited, 1998.
- Юбилейный Справочник выпускников Санкт-Петербургского академического института живописи, скульптуры и архитектуры имени И. Е. Репина Российской Академии художеств. 1915—2005. Санкт Петербург, «Первоцвет», 2007. C.32.
