= Nikolai Brandt =

Russian painter

- Николай Брандт
- Born: 26 December 1917; Petrograd, Russian Republic
- Died: 20 March 1975 (aged 57); Leningrad, Russian SFSR, Soviet Union
- Education: Repin Institute of Arts
- Known for: Painting
- Movement: Realism
- Awards: Medal "For the Defence of Leningrad", Medal for the Victory over Germany

Nikolai Nikolaevich Brandt (Russian: Николай Николаевич Брандт; 26 December 1917 – 28 March 1975) was a Soviet Russian painter and stage decorator. He lived and worked in Leningrad. He was a member of the Leningrad Union of Artists and is regarded as a representative of the Leningrad school of painting, known for his landscape paintings.

== Biography ==
Brandt studied at the Tavricheskaya Art School from 1935 to 1939. In 1948 he graduated from the Repin Institute of Arts in the workshop of Mikhail Bobyshov. He was a pupil of Alexander Debler and Mikhail Bobyshov. He participated in art exhibitions from the beginning of the 1950s. A talented colorist, he worked mainly in the genre of landscape painting. From 1960 to 1970 he repeatedly worked in the Staraya Ladoga House of Creativity, in Pskov, and at the Akademicheskaya Dacha. His personal exhibition was in Leningrad in 1982 in the Exhibition Centre of the Leningrad Union of Artists.

Brandt died on 28 March 1975 in Leningrad at the age of 57 from severe heart disease. He is buried in South Cemetery in Leningrad. His works reside in art museums and private collections in Russia, Finland, Japan, the United Kingdom, France, and other countries.

== Sources ==
- Земская М. За правду жизни и большую мысль. К итогам осенней выставки ленинградских художников. // Смена, 1954, 18 декабря.
- Осенняя выставка произведений ленинградских художников 1956 года. Каталог. Л., Ленинградский художник, 1958. С.7.
- 1917 — 1957. Выставка произведений ленинградских художников. Каталог. Л., Ленинградский художник, 1958. С.10.
- Осенняя выставка произведений ленинградских художников 1958 года. Каталог. Л., Художник РСФСР, 1959. С.7.
- Выставка произведений ленинградских художников 1960 года. Каталог. Л., Художник РСФСР, 1961. С.10.
- Республиканская художественная выставка «Советская Россия». Каталог. М., Советский художник, 1960. С.18.
- Выставка произведений ленинградских художников 1961 года. Каталог. Л., Художник РСФСР, 1964. С.11.
- Ленинград. Зональная выставка 1964 года. Каталог. Л, Художник РСФСР, 1965. C.12.
- Каталог весенней выставки произведений ленинградских художников 1965 года. Л., Художник РСФСР, 1970. С.9.
- Весенняя выставка произведений ленинградских художников 1971 года. Каталог. Л., Художник РСФСР, 1972. C.7.
- Художники народов СССР. Биографический словарь. Т. 2.. М., Искусство, 1972. С.61.
- Каталог Осенней выставки произведений ленинградских художников 1971 года. - Л: Художник РСФСР, 1973. - с.5.
- По родной стране. Выставка произведений художников Ленинграда. 50-Летию образования СССР посвящается. Каталог. Л., Художник РСФСР, 1974. С.10.
- Справочник членов Ленинградской организации Союза художников РСФСР. Л., Художник РСФСР, 1972. C.8.
- Натюрморт. Выставка произведений ленинградских художников 1973 года. Л., Художник РСФСР, 1973. C.7.
- Весенняя выставка произведений ленинградских художников. Каталог. Л., Художник РСФСР, 1974. C.6.
- Наш современник. Зональная выставка произведений ленинградских художников 1975 года. Каталог. Л., Художник РСФСР, 1980. C.12.
- Изобразительное искусство Ленинграда. Каталог выставки. Л., Художник РСФСР, 1976. C.15.
- Брандт Николай Николаевич. Выставка произведений. Каталог. Л., Художник РСФСР, 1982.
- Sergei V. Ivanov. Unknown Socialist Realism. The Leningrad School. Saint Petersburg, NP-Print Edition, 2007. P.24, 390, 393, 397, 398, 401, 404, 444. ISBN 5-901724-21-6, ISBN 978-5-901724-21-7.
