= Alexander Tatarenko =

Russian painter

Alexander Alexandrovich Tatarenko
- Born: October 5, 1925; Ochakov, Nikolaev oblast, USSR
- Died: December 1, 1999 (aged 74); Saint Petersburg, Russian Federation
- Education: Vera Mukhina Institute
- Known for: Painting
- Movement: Realism

Alexander Alexandrovich Tatarenko (Russian: Алекса́ндр Алекса́ндрович Тата́ренко; October 5, 1925 – December 1, 1999) was a Russian painter, restorer, art teacher, and member of the Saint Petersburg Union of Artists who regarded as a representative of the Leningrad School of Painting.

== Biography ==
Alexander Alexandrovich Tatarenko was born October 5, 1925, in Ochakov city, Nikolaev oblast of southern Ukraine, USSR. Since 1933 Alexander Tatarenko lived in Leningrad.

In 1942–1945 Tatrenko took part in the Great Patriotic War and was wounded. Then he was mobilized in the fleet until 1950. He was awarded many military orders and medals.

In 1955 Alexander Tatarenko graduated from Vera Mukhina Institute in Leningrad in Alexander Kazantsev workshop. He studied of Stepan Privedentsev, Ivan Stepashkin, Piotr Buchkin, Kiril Iogansen.

Since 1960 Alexander Tatarenko has participated in Art Exhibitions. He painted portraits, landscapes, seascapes, cityscapes, genre compositions. Alexander Tatarenko worked as easel and monumental painter, restorer, Art teacher. His solo exhibitions were in Leningrad (1962, 1981), Odessa (1963, 1982).

Alexander Tatarenko was a member of the Saint Petersburg Union of Artists (before 1992 – Leningrad branch of Union of Artists of Russian Federation) since 1955, a Member of Peter's Academy of Sciences and Arts (1996).

Alexander Alexandrovich Tatarenko died on December 1, 1999, at the seventy-fifth year of life. His paintings reside in Art museums of Saint Petersburg, Petrozavodsk, Nikolaev, Ochakov, Lvov, in private collections in Russia, France, Ukraine, Finland, Germany, USA, England, Japan, and throughout the world.

== Bibliography ==
- Alexander Alexandrovich Tatarenko. Exhibition of works. Catalogue. – Leningrad: Khudozhnik RSFSR, 1981.
- Directory of members of the Leningrad branch of Union of Artists of Russian Federation. – Leningrad: Khudozhnik RSFSR, 1987. – p. 129.
- Soviet realist and impressionist paintings. – London: Phillips Auction, 1994.
- Matthew C. Bown. Dictionary of 20th Century Russian and Soviet Painters 1900-1980s. – London: Izomar 1998. ISBN 0-9532061-0-6, ISBN 978-0-9532061-0-0.
- Vern G. Swanson. Soviet Impressionism. – Woodbridge, England: Antique Collectors' Club, 2001. – p. 183. ISBN 1-85149-280-1, ISBN 978-1-85149-280-0.
- Artists of Peter's Academy of Arts and Sciences. – Saint Petersburg: Ladoga Publishing House, 2008. – pp. 174–175.
- Sergei V. Ivanov. Unknown Socialist Realism. The Leningrad School. – Saint Petersburg: NP-Print Edition, 2007. – pp. 254, 277, 370, 394, 396, 397, 400, 402, 403, 405, 406, 444. ISBN 5-901724-21-6, ISBN 978-5-901724-21-7.
