= Lia Ostrova =

Russian painter

Lia Alexandrovna Ostrova
- Born: 3 August 1914; Sochi, Russian Empire
- Died: 2009 (aged 94–95); Saint Petersburg
- Known for: Painting
- Movement: Realism

Lia Alexandrovna Ostrova (Russian: Лия Александровна Острова; 3 August 1914 – 2009) was a Soviet Russian painter, graphic artist and art teacher, a member of the Saint Petersburg Union of Artists (before 1992 — the Leningrad Union of Artists), who lived and worked in Leningrad - Petersburg. Lia Ostrova regard as one of representatives of the Leningrad school of painting.

== Biography ==
In 1939 Lia Ostrova graduated from the Institute of Painting, Sculpture and Architecture in the Isaak Brodsky workshop with the rank of artist of painting. His degree work was a painting titled "Competition for young talents".

In 1939 Lia Ostrova was adopted in the Leningrad Union of Soviet Artists. Since 1939 she had participated in Art Exhibitions. Lia Ostrova painted portraits, landscapes, still life, genre compositions. The main theme of her creation was music, children and flowers.

== See also ==
- Fine Art of Leningrad
- Leningrad School of Painting
- List of 20th-century Russian painters
- List of painters of Saint Petersburg Union of Artists
- Saint Petersburg Union of Artists

== Sources ==
- Выставка произведений ленинградских художников 1951 года. Каталог. Л., Лениздат, 1951. С.15.
- 1917—1957. Выставка произведений ленинградских художников. Каталог. Л., Ленинградский художник, 1958. С. 24.
- Осенняя выставка произведений ленинградских художников 1958 года. Каталог. Л., Художник РСФСР, 1959. С. 20.
- Двести лет Академии художеств СССР. Каталог выставки. Л-М., Искусство, 1958. С.146—147.
- Выставка произведений ленинградских художников 1960 года. Каталог. Л., Художник РСФСР, 1963. С.14.
- Выставка произведений ленинградских художников 1960 года. Каталог. Л., Художник РСФСР, 1961. С.30.
- Выставка произведений ленинградских художников 1961 года. Каталог. Л., Художник РСФСР, 1964. С.30.
- Л. Острова. Родные просторы // Вечерний Ленинград, 1961, 16 сентября.
- Адашевский А. До будущих встреч // Вечерний Ленинград, 1961, 26 сентября.
- Осенняя выставка произведений ленинградских художников 1962 года. Каталог. Л., Художник РСФСР, 1962. С. 20.
- Ленинград. Зональная выставка. Л., Художник РСФСР, 1965. С.38—39.
- Третья республиканская художественная выставка «Советская Россия». Каталог. М., Министерство культуры РСФСР, 1967. С.42.
- Наш современник. Каталог выставки произведений ленинградских художников 1971 года. Л., Художник РСФСР, 1972. С.17.
- Наш современник. Вторая выставка произведений ленинградских художников 1972 года. Каталог. Л., Художник РСФСР, 1973. С.9.
- Натюрморт. Выставка произведений ленинградских художников 1973 года. — Л. : Художник РСФСР, 1973. — С. 11.
- Наш современник. Зональная выставка произведений ленинградских художников 1975 года. Каталог. Л., Художник РСФСР, 1980. C.21.
- Выставка произведений художников-женщин Ленинграда. 1975 год. Л., Художник РСФСР, 1979. С.6.
- Пятая республиканская выставка «Советская Россия». М., Советский художник, 1975. С.34.
- Изобразительное искусство Ленинграда. Каталог выставки. Л., Художник РСФСР, 1976. С.25.
- Выставка произведений ленинградских художников, посвящённая 60-летию Великого Октября. Л., Художник РСФСР, 1982. С.18.
- Зональная выставка произведений ленинградских художников 1980 года. Каталог. Л., Художник РСФСР, 1983. С.19.
- Справочник членов Ленинградской организации Союза художников РСФСР. Л., Художник РСФСР, 1980. С.89.
- Интерьер и натюрморт. Выставка произведений живописи художников Российской Федерации. Каталог. Л., Художник РСФСР, 1991. С.53.
- Peinture Russe. Catalogue. Paris, Drouot Richelieu, 24 Septembre 1991. Р.50—51.
- Peintures Russes. Catalogue. Palais Des Beaux-Arts. Bruxelles, 17 Fevrier, 1993. Р.40.
- Художник Лия Острова. Выставка произведений. Живопись. Рисунок. СПб., Выставочный центр Санкт-Петербургского Союза художников России, 1997.
- Связь времён. 1932—1997. Художники — члены Санкт-Петербургского Союза художников России. Каталог выставки. СПб., ЦВЗ «Манеж», 1997. С.294.
- Выставка, посвящённая 55-летию победы в Великой Отечественной войне. СПб., 2000. С.7.

Sergei V. Ivanov. Unknown Socialist Realism. The Leningrad School. Saint Petersburg: NP-Print Edition, 2007. P.20, 360, 372, 373, 384, 385, 388, 389, 391—393, 398, 399, 401, 405, 406, 446. ISBN 5-901724-21-6, ISBN 978-5-901724-21-7

- Юбилейный Справочник выпускников Санкт-Петербургского академического института живописи, скульптуры и архитектуры имени И. Е. Репина Российской Академии художеств. 1915—2005. СПб., «Первоцвет», 2007. С.51.
