= Gevork Kotiantz =

Russian painter

Gevork Vartanovich Kotiantz
- Born: 12 November 1909; Shusha, Shusha uezd, Elizavetpol Governorate, Russian Empire
- Died: 28 August 1996 (aged 86); Saint Petersburg, Russia
- Known for: Painting
- Awards: Order of the Red Star Medal "For the Defence of Leningrad" Medal for Battle Merit Medal "For the Victory Over Germany" Order of the Patriotic War

Gevork Vartanovich Kotiantz (Armenian: Գևորգ Վարդանի Կոթյանց; Russian: Гево́рк Варта́нович Котья́нц; 12 November 1909 – 28 August 1996) was a Soviet Armenian painter, who lived and worked in Leningrad, regarded as one of representatives of the Leningrad school of painting.

== Biography ==
He was born on 12 November 1909 in Shusha, Elizavetpol Governorate in the family of craftsman jeweler. In the same year his family moved to the North Caucasus in Pyatigorsk.

In 1927-1929 Kotiantz engaged in a private Art studio in Pyatigorsk, independently studied paintings of outstanding artists of the past through books and reproductions, and a lot painted from the life. In 1929, he became a member of the Pyatigorsk branch of the AKhR — Association of Artists of the Revolution (Russian: Ассоциация художников революции, Assotsiatsia Khudozhnikov Revolutsii or AKhR, 1928-1932).

In 1930 for the first time Kotiantz participated in Art exhibition in Pyatigorsk, then in the cities of the North Caucasus Essentuki, Kislovodsk, Mineral Waters.

In 1931-1932, Kotiantz worked as an artist at the Museum of the Revolution in Pyatigorsk, where he tried his hand in the genre of historical and revolutionary paintings. Several of his works were purchased by the museum.

In 1933, he was sent to study in Leningrad. In 1934-1935 Kotiantz engaged at the Higher Training Courses of Artists where he studied of known painters and art educators Pavel Naumov, Alexander Karev, and Rudolf Frentz. In this time Kotiantz continues to work on historical and revolutionary genre, his painting "Kirov in Baku" was awarded the second prize of the All-Russian Academy of Arts.

In the same years he discovered to himself the art of the French impressionists, which largely changed the direction of his own creative quest. After completing the Higher Training Courses, Kotiantz worked in Leningrad City Committee of Artists.

In 1936, Kotiantz was called to service in the Red Army, in 1939-1940 he took part as a soldier in the Soviet-Finnish war known as the Winter War of 1939–1940. In 1940, he was demobilized and returned to creative work. In the same year he was admitted to the Leningrad Union of Soviet Artists.

From the early days of the Great Patriotic War Kotiantz served in the Red Army on the Leningrad Front. He fought as a signalman in the 23rd Army. He was wounded twice, marked by military awards, including the Order of the Red Star, Medal "For the Defence of Leningrad", Medal for Battle Merit, Medal "For the Victory Over Germany", Order of the Patriotic War. He demobilized in 1945 with the rank of sergeant.

In 1945-1946, Kotiantz taught drawing and painting at the Tavricheskaya Art School in Leningrad. Simultaneously, he hard restored his creative skills that were lost during the war. It was during this period that he enjoyed the expressive possibilities of color. In 1947, he married Catherine Kostromeeva, who taught French. In 1948, they had a daughter, Tatiana.

== Creativity ==
Since 1948 Kotiantz becomes permanent participant of Art exhibitions, showing his works together with the works of the leading masters of fine arts of Leningrad. He painted still lifes, portraits, genre and historical paintings. In the mid-1950s the leading genre of his art becomes decorative still life, almost unlimited in the author's choice of objects, which allows him infinitely vary in search of harmony of color combinations. A rather conditional forms in his paintings were used to detect color, to forcing him again and again to create coloristic unique picture of the world, though limited of size of a table.

Entirely fascinated by problems of colors, tones, warm and cold relations, Kotiantz not take the trouble to choose original names for his paintings. This will create certain difficulties in the future for the researchers of his art. For example, in 1957 at the Art exhibition in Russian museum he give title "Still Life" for four out of five paintings. The same is true at the Spring Art exhibition in 1954, Autumn Art exhibitions in 1956 and 1958 year in the Leningrad Union of Artists. Only later he began to give his compositions more complete title: "Still Life with Lemons" (1969), "Breakfast. Still Life" (1964), "Breakfast" (1963), "A Meat. Still Life" (1965), "Pink Still Life" (1967), "Grapes" (1972) and others.

In the same manner Kotiantz created not as numerous genre scenes and portraits, models which often served as the wife and daughter of the artist. The best of them are characteristic of monumental compositions and exquisite color relationships, allowing the artist deeply the inner content of the image. Among them paintings "Tanya" (1956), "A Girl at the brook" (1958), "Portrait of E. Kostromeeva, a French teacher (the artist's wife)" (1959), "From the village to the City", "Girl with Peaches" (both 1961), "Shopgirl", "Mariners" (both 1970), "Portrait of Tatiana Kotiantz as student" (1971), "Portrait of a teacher" (1971), "Grapes", "Still life" (both 1972), "Green still Life" (1975), "Poppies", "Still Life with a crimson material" (both 1980), and others.

Gevork Kotiantz have had solo exhibitions of painting in Leningrad in 1979, and in Moscow in 1985. In 1990s his paintings successfully participated in exhibitions and auctions of Russian Art in Italy, England, France, Germany, where his work has acquired its admirers.

Gevork Vartanovich Kotiantz died on 28 August 1996 in Saint Petersburg, aged 86. Paintings by Gevork Kotiantz reside in Art museums and private collections in the Russia, France, Armenia, in the U.S., Italy, and other countries.

== See also ==
- Leningrad School of Painting
- List of 20th-century Russian painters
- List of painters of Saint Petersburg Union of Artists
- Saint Petersburg Union of Artists

== Sources ==
- Весенняя выставка произведений ленинградских художников 1954 года. Каталог. Л., Изогиз, 1954. P.12.
- Весенняя выставка произведений ленинградских художников 1955 года. Каталог. Л., ЛССХ, 1956. P.12.
- Весенняя выставка произведений ленинградских художников 1955 года. Каталог. Л., ЛССХ, 1956.
- Осенняя выставка произведений ленинградских художников 1956 года. Каталог. Л., Ленинградский художник, 1958. P.14.
- 1917 — 1957. Выставка произведений ленинградских художников. Каталог. Л., Ленинградский художник, 1958. P.19.
- Осенняя выставка произведений ленинградских художников 1958 года. Каталог. Л., Художник РСФСР, 1959. P.16.
- Выставка произведений ленинградских художников 1960 года. Каталог. Л., Художник РСФСР, 1963. P.12.
- Exhibition of works by Leningrad artists of 1960. Exhibition catalogue. Leningrad, Khudozhnik RSFSR, 1961. P.23.
- Выставка произведений ленинградских художников 1961 года. Каталог. Л., Художник РСФСР, 1964. P.23.
- Осенняя выставка произведений ленинградских художников 1962 года. Каталог. Л., Художник РСФСР, 1962. P.16.
- The Leningrad Fine Arts Exhibition. Leningrad, Khudozhnik RSFSR, 1965. P.28.
- Осенняя выставка произведений ленинградских художников 1968 года. Каталог. Л., Художник РСФСР, 1971. P.9.
- Spring Exhibition of works by Leningrad artists of 1969. Catalogue. Leningrad, Khudozhnik RSFSR, 1970. P.12.
- Art works by Russian Federation Artists grants to Museums and Culture Institutions (1963 - 1971). Official Catalogue. - Moscow: Russian Federation Union of Artists, 1972. - p. 52.
- Наш современник. Каталог выставки произведений ленинградских художников 1971 года. Л., Художник РСФСР, 1972. P.13.
- The Still-Life. Exhibition of works by Leningrad artists. Exhibition catalogue. -Leningrad: Khudozhnik RSFSR, 1973. - p. 10.
- Our Contemporary The Second Exhibition of works by Leningrad artists of 1972. Catalogue. Leningrad, Khudozhnik RSFSR, 1973. P.7.
- Our Contemporary The Third Exhibition of works by Leningrad artists of 1973. Catalogue. Leningrad, Khudozhnik RSFSR, 1974. P.9.
- Across the Motherland Exhibition of Leningrad artists. Catalogue. - Leningrad: Khudozhnik RSFSR, 1974. - p. 16.
- Our Contemporary regional exhibition of Leningrad artists of 1975. Catalogue. Leningrad, Khudozhnik RSFSR, 1980. P.17.
- The Fine Arts of Leningrad. Exhibition catalogue. - Leningrad: Khudozhnik RSFSR, 1976. - p. 21.
- The Portrait of Contemporary the fifth exhibition of works by Leningrad artists of 1976. Catalogue. - Leningrad: Khudozhnik RSFSR, 1983. - p. 12.
- Exhibition of works by Leningrad artists dedicated to the 60th Anniversary of October Revolution. Catalogue. - Leningrad: Khudozhnik RSFSR, 1982. - p. 15.
- Autumn Exhibition of works by Leningrad artists of 1978. Exhibition Catalogue. - Leningrad: Khudozhnik RSFSR, 1983. - p. 10.
- Gevork Vartanovich Kotiantz. Exhibition of works. Catalogue. - Leningrad: Khudozhnik RSFSR, 1979.
- Directory of members of the Union of Artists of USSR. Volume 1. - Moscow: Soviet artist, 1979. - p. 552.
- Regional Exhibition of works by Leningrad artists of 1980. Exhibition catalogue. Leningrad, Khudozhnik RSFSR, 1983. P.15.
- Exhibitions of Soviet art. Directory. Volume 5. 1954 - 1958. - Moscow: Soviet Artist, 1981. - pp. 25, 27, 142, 259, 261, 386, 548.
- Exhibition of works by Leningrad artists-veterans of Great Patriotic war. - Leningrad: Khudozhnik RSFSR, 1990. - p. 10.
- Gevork Kotiantz. Painting. Exhibition of works. Catalogue. - Moscow: Soviet Artist, 1985.
- Directory of members of the Leningrad branch of Union of Artists of Russian Federation. - Leningrad: Khudozhnik RSFSR, 1987. - p. 64.
- Saint-Petersbourg - Pont-Audemer. Dessins, Gravures, Sculptures et Tableaux du XX siecle du fonds de L' Union des Artistes de Saint-Petersbourg. Pont-Audemer, 1994. P.99, 104.
- Matthew C. Bown. Dictionary of 20th Century Russian and Soviet Painters 1900-1980s. - London: Izomar, 1998. ISBN 0-9532061-0-6, ISBN 978-0-9532061-0-0.
- Link of Times: 1932 - 1997. Artists - Members of Saint - Petersburg Union of Artists of Russia. Exhibition catalogue. - Saint - Petersburg: Manezh Central Exhibition Hall, 1997. - p. 290.
- Логвинова Е. В. Круглый стол по ленинградскому искусству в галерее АРКА // Петербургские искусствоведческие тетради. Вып. 31. СПб, 2014. С.17-26.
