= Ivan Godlevsky =

Russian painter (1908–1998)

- Иван Годлевский
- Born: 9 March 1908; Kholm Governorate, Russian Empire
- Died: 20 August 1998 (aged 90); Saint Petersburg, Russia
- Education: Repin Institute of Arts
- Known for: Painting
- Movement: Realism
- Awards: Order of the Red Banner; Order of the Red Star; Order of the Patriotic War; Medal "For the Victory Over Germany"

Ivan Ivanovich Godlevsky (Russian: Иван Иванович Годлевский; 8 March 1908 – 20 August 1998) was a Soviet Russian painter, a member of the Saint Petersburg Union of Artists (before 1992 — the Leningrad Union of Artists), who lived and worked in Leningrad, regarded as a representative of the Leningrad school of painting, most famous for his landscapes painted in decorative style.

== Biography ==
Ivan Godlevsky grew up in an orphanage. In 1925, he enrolled in an art school in Mirhorod. In 1927, he transferred to the Kiev Art Institute and attended Art Nouveau classes by Fedir Krychevsky.

== See also ==
- Fine Art of Leningrad
- Leningrad School of Painting
- List of 20th-century Russian painters
- List of painters of Saint Petersburg Union of Artists
- Saint Petersburg Union of Artists

== Sources ==
- Выставка произведений ленинградских художников 1951 года. Каталог. — Л.: Лениздат, 1951. — с.10.
- Осенняя выставка произведений ленинградских художников. 1956 года. Каталог. — Л.: Ленинградский художник, 1958. — с.9.
- Мочалов Л. Выставка без жюри. Новые работы ленинградских живописцев // Вечерний Ленинград, 1956, 11 декабря.
- 1917 — 1957. Выставка произведений ленинградских художников. Каталог. — Л.: Ленинградский художник, 1958. — с.12.
- Осенняя выставка произведений ленинградских художников 1958 года. Каталог. — Л.: Художник РСФСР, 1959. — с.9.
- Выставка произведений ленинградских художников 1960 года. Каталог. — Л.: Художник РСФСР, 1961. — с.14.
- Выставка произведений ленинградских художников 1961 года. Каталог. — Л.: Художник РСФСР, 1964. — с.14.
- Осенняя выставка произведений ленинградских художников 1962 года. Каталог. — Л.: Художник РСФСР, 1962. — с.11.
- Ленинград. Зональная выставка. — Л.: Художник РСФСР, 1965. — с.17.
- Весенняя выставка произведений ленинградских художников 1971 года. Каталог. — Л.: Художник РСФСР, 1972. — с.8.
- Каталог Осенней выставки произведений ленинградских художников 1971 года. — Л.: Художник РСФСР, 1973. — с.7.
- Наш современник. Зональная выставка произведений ленинградских художников 1975 года. Каталог. — Л.: Художник РСФСР, 1980. — с.14.
- Изобразительное искусство Ленинграда. Каталог выставки. — Л.: Художник РСФСР, 1976. — с.17.
- Портрет современника. Пятая выставка произведений ленинградских художников 1976 года. Каталог. — Л.: Художник РСФСР, 1983. — с.8.
- Выставка произведений ленинградских художников, посвящённая 60-летию Великого Октября. — Л.: Художник РСФСР, 1982. — с.13.
- Зональная выставка произведений ленинградских художников 1980 года. Каталог. — Л.: Художник РСФСР, 1983. — с.12.
- Справочник членов Союза художников СССР. Том 1. — М.: Советский художник, 1979. — с.257.
- 40 лет Великой победы. Выставка произведений художников — ветеранов Великой Отечественной войны. Каталог. — Л.: Художник РСФСР, 1990. — с.8.
- Справочник членов Ленинградской организации Союза художников РСФСР. — Л: Художник РСФСР, 1987. — с.31.
- L' École de Leningrad. Auction Catalogue. Paris, Drouot Richelieu, 16 Juin 1989. P.66-67.
- Peinture Russe. Catalogue. Paris, Drouot Richelieu, 24 Septembre 1991. P.38-41.
- Связь времён. 1932—1997. Художники — члены Санкт — Петербургского Союза художников России. Каталог выставки. — Санкт-Петербург: ЦВЗ «Манеж», 1997. — с.286.
- Памяти учителя. Выставка петербургских художников — учеников мастерской А. А. Осмеркина. — Санкт-Петербург: Мемориальный музей Н. А. Некрасова, 1997.
- Matthew Cullerne Bown. A Dictionary of Twentieth Century Russian And Soviet Painters. 1900 — 1980s. — London: Izomar Limited, 1998.
- Мы помним… Художники, искусствоведы — участники Великой Отечественной войны. — М: Союз художников России, 2000. — с.78.
- Каплунов В. С., Кекушева Г. В. Иван Годлевский. Живопись. — Санкт-Петербург: Петрополь, 2004.
- Мастера советской живописи. Аукцион № 5. — Санкт-Петербург: Галерея «Львиный мостик», 18 февраля 2005. — с.31-32.
- Sergei V. Ivanov. Unknown Socialist Realism. The Leningrad School. Saint Petersburg, NP-Print Edition, 2007. P.24, 388—390, 392, 398, 399, 402, 405, 443. ISBN 5-901724-21-6, ISBN 978-5-901724-21-7.
- Чегодаева М. Искусство как классовая идеология // Диалог искусств. № 4, 2010. С. 42.
- Традиции школы живописи государственной художественно-промышленной академии имени А. Л. Штиглица. Кафедра общей живописи. — СПб., 2010. С. 14, 270.
