= Yuri Mezhirov =

Russian artist (1933–2012)

Yuri Alexandrovich Mezhirov
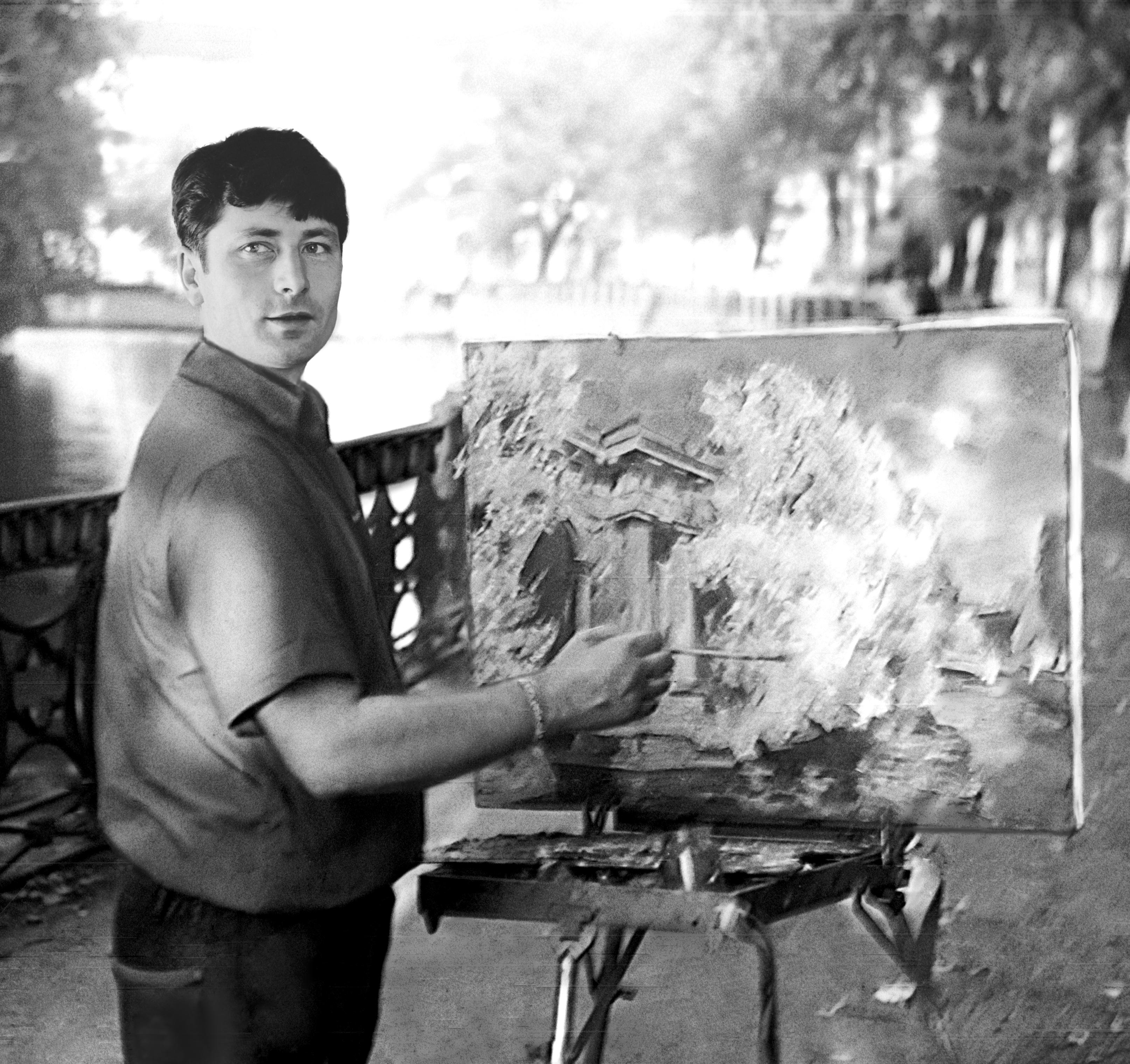
- Born: 7 February 1933; Leningrad, USSR
- Died: 13 June 2012 (aged 79); Saint Petersburg, Russia
- Known for: Painting
- Movement: Realism

Yuri Alexandrovich Mezhirov (Russian: Юрий Александрович Межиров; 7 February 1933 – 13 June 2012) was a Soviet Russian painter, graphic artist and art teacher, People artist of Russian Federation, a member of the Saint Petersburg Union of Artists (before 1992 — the Leningrad Union of Artists), who lived and worked in Leningrad - Petersburg. Mezhirov belongs to the Leningrad school of painting.

== Biography ==
In 1965 Mezhirov graduated from the Institute of Painting, Sculpture and Architecture in the Victor Oreshnikov workshop with the rank of artist of painting. His degree work was a painting titled "At the Front".

In 1967 Mezhirov was adopted in the Leningrad Union of Soviet Artists. Since 1965 he had participated in Art Exhibitions, painted genre and historical painting, landscapes, cityscapes, still life.

Mezhirov died in Saint Petersburg on 13 June 2012. His paintings reside in State Russian Museum, in art museums and private collections in Russia, France, in the U.S., Ukraine, Germany, England, and throughout the world.

== See also ==
- Fine Art of Leningrad
- Leningrad School of Painting
- List of 20th-century Russian painters
- List of painters of Saint Petersburg Union of Artists
- Saint Petersburg Union of Artists

== Sources ==
- Губарев А., Дмитренко А. В простом, казалось бы, мотиве … // Вечерний Ленинград, 1971, 5 января.
- Весенняя выставка произведений ленинградских художников 1971 года. Каталог. Л., Художник РСФСР, 1972. C.11.
- Наш современник. Каталог выставки произведений ленинградских художников 1971 года. Л., Художник РСФСР, 1972. С.9.
- Наш современник. Вторая выставка произведений ленинградских художников 1972 года. Каталог. Л., Художник РСФСР, 1973. С.9.
- По родной стране. Выставка произведений художников Ленинграда. 50 Летию образования СССР посвящается. Каталог. Л., Художник РСФСР, 1974. С.18.
- Натюрморт. Выставка произведений ленинградских художников 1973 года. Каталог. Л., Художник РСФСР, 1973. С.11.
- Наш современник. Третья выставка произведений ленинградских художников 1973 года. Каталог. Л., Художник РСФСР, 1974. С.10.
- Яковлева Л. Величие подвига // Вечерний Ленинград, 1975, 27 мая.
- Наш современник. Зональная выставка произведений ленинградских художников 1975 года. Каталог. Л., Художник РСФСР, 1980. С.19.
- Изобразительное искусство Ленинграда. Каталог выставки. Л., Художник РСФСР, 1976. С.23.
- Портрет современника. Пятая выставка произведений ленинградских художников 1976 года. Каталог. Л., Художник РСФСР, 1983. С.15.
- Выставка произведений ленинградских художников, посвящённая 60-летию Великого Октября. Л., Художник РСФСР, 1982. С.17.
- Осенняя выставка произведений ленинградских художников. 1978 года. Каталог. Л., Художник РСФСР, 1983. С.11.
- Справочник членов Союза художников СССР. Т.2. М., Советский художник, 1979. С.254.
- Зональная выставка произведений ленинградских художников 1980 года. Каталог. Л., Художник РСФСР, 1983. С.17.
- Леняшин В. Поиски художественной правды // Художник. 1981, № 1. С.8-17.
- Левандовский С. Живопись на Ленинградской зональной // Искусство. 1981, № 2. С.63.
- Справочник членов Ленинградской организации Союза художников РСФСР. Л., Художник РСФСР, 1987. С.82.
- Peinture Russe. Catalogue. Paris, Drouot Richelieu, 18 Fevrier, 1991.
- Ecole De Saint-Petersburg. Catalogue. Paris, Drouot Richelieu, 27 Janvier, 1992.
- Peintures Russes. Catalogue. Bruxelles, 17 Fevrier, 1993. Р.37—38.
- Связь времён. 1932—1997. Художники — члены Санкт-Петербургского Союза художников России. Каталог выставки. СПб., ЦВЗ «Манеж», 1997. С.293.
- Matthew Cullerne Bown. A Dictionary of Twentieth Century Russian And Soviet Painters. 1900-1980s.

London, Izomar Limited, 1998.

- Мастера советской живописи. Аукцион № 5. СПб., Галерея «Львиный мостик», 18 февраля 2005. С.29-30.
- Юбилейный Справочник выпускников Санкт-Петербургского академического института живописи, скульптуры и архитектуры имени И. Е. Репина Российской Академии художеств. 1915—2005. СПб., «Первоцвет», 2007. С.68.
