= Samuil Nevelshtein =

Russian painter

Samuil Grigorievich Nevelshtein
- Born: 22 March 1903; Kherson, Russian Empire
- Died: 16 November 1983 (aged 80); Leningrad, USSR
- Education: Repin Institute of Arts
- Known for: Painting
- Movement: Realism

Samuil Grigorievich Nevelshtein (Russian: Самуи́л Григо́рьевич Невельште́йн; 22 March 1903 – 16 November 1983) was a Soviet Russian painter, watercolorist, graphic artist, and art teacher, lived and worked in Leningrad, regarded as one of the representatives of the Leningrad school of painting, most known for his portraits of children and youth.

== Biography ==
Samuil Grigorievich Nevelshtein was born on 22 March 1903 in Kherson, Russian Empire (now in Ukraine).

In 1923 Samuil Nevelshtein came to Moscow and entered VKhuTeMas, which he had graduated in 1927.

In the same year Samuil Nevelshtein arrived in Leningrad and went outside of the competition in the VKhuTeIn (since 1932 - Leningrad Institute of Painting, Sculpture and Architecture). He studied with Vasily Savinsky, Arcady Rylov, Mikhail Bernshtein, Alexei Karev.

In 1931 Samuil Nevelshtein graduated from Proletarian Institute of Fine Arts (former VKhuTeIn). His graduation work was genre painting named "Children's Holiday".

Since 1928 Samuil Nevelshtein has participated in Art Exhibitions. He painted portraits, genre and historical paintings, landscapes, still lifes, worked in oil painting, watercolors, pencil drawing. Solo exhibitions by Samuil Nevelshtein were in Leningrad in 1944, 1956, 1964, 1968, and 1985 year. In 1935 he was admitted to the Leningrad Union of Artists. The main theme of Samuil Nevelshtein paintings was the image of a young contemporary, leading genres - portraits and thematic painting.

Associate Isaac Brodsky, he gave a lot of energy to the organizing of children's art education in Leningrad, heading in the years 1935-1941 Secondary Art School at the All-Russian Academy of Arts. In these years, Secondary Art School pupils were Mikhail Anikushin, Vecheslav Zagonek, Yuri Tulin, Anatoli Levitin, Nikolai Kochukov, Iya Venkova, Vladimir Chekalov, Evgenia Antipova, Victor Teterin, Maya Kopitseva, Elena Kostenko, Abram Grushko, Oleg Lomakin, and others, subsequently became well-known Leningrad artists and sculptors.

Samuil Grigorievich Nevelshtein died on 16 November 1983 in Leningrad at the eighty-first year of life. Paintings by Samuil Nevelshtein reside in State Russian Museum, in Art museums and private collections in Russia, USA, France, China, Israel, England, Japan, and throughout the world. Family: Samuil G. Neveshtein had a son -- Valery Samoilovich Nevelshtein, whom he painted as a child several times. Valery Nevelshtein had a scientific degree in philosophy and is known as an outstranding teacher of Russian language and literature.

== See also ==
- Leningrad School of Painting
- List of Russian artists
- List of painters of Saint Petersburg Union of Artists
- List of the Russian Landscape painters
- Saint Petersburg Union of Artists
- Academicheskaya Dacha

== Bibliography ==
- Irina Alexandrova. Samuil Grigorievich Nevelshtein. - Leningrad: Khudozhnik RSFSR, 1989. - 40 p.
- Peinture Russe. Catalogue. - Paris: Drouot Richelieu, 26 Avril, 1991. - p. 7,52.
- Charmes Russes. Catalogue. - Paris: Drouot Richelieu, 15 Mai 1991. - p. 37.
- Les Saisons Russes. Catalogue. - Paris: Drouot Richelieu, 29 Novembre 1993. - p. 12.
- Matthew C. Bown. Dictionary of 20th Century Russian and Soviet Painters 1900-1980s. - London: Izomar, 1998. ISBN 0-9532061-0-6, ISBN 978-0-9532061-0-0.
- Time for change. The Art of 1960-1985 in the Soviet Union. - Saint Petersburg: State Russian Museum, 2006. - p. 154.
- Sergei V. Ivanov. Unknown Socialist Realism. The Leningrad School. - Saint Petersburg: NP-Print Edition, 2007. – pp. 9, 19, 20, 395, 385, 387-399, 401, 404, 405, 444. ISBN 5-901724-21-6, ISBN 978-5-901724-21-7.
