= Fine art of Leningrad =

Fine art of Soviet Russian city

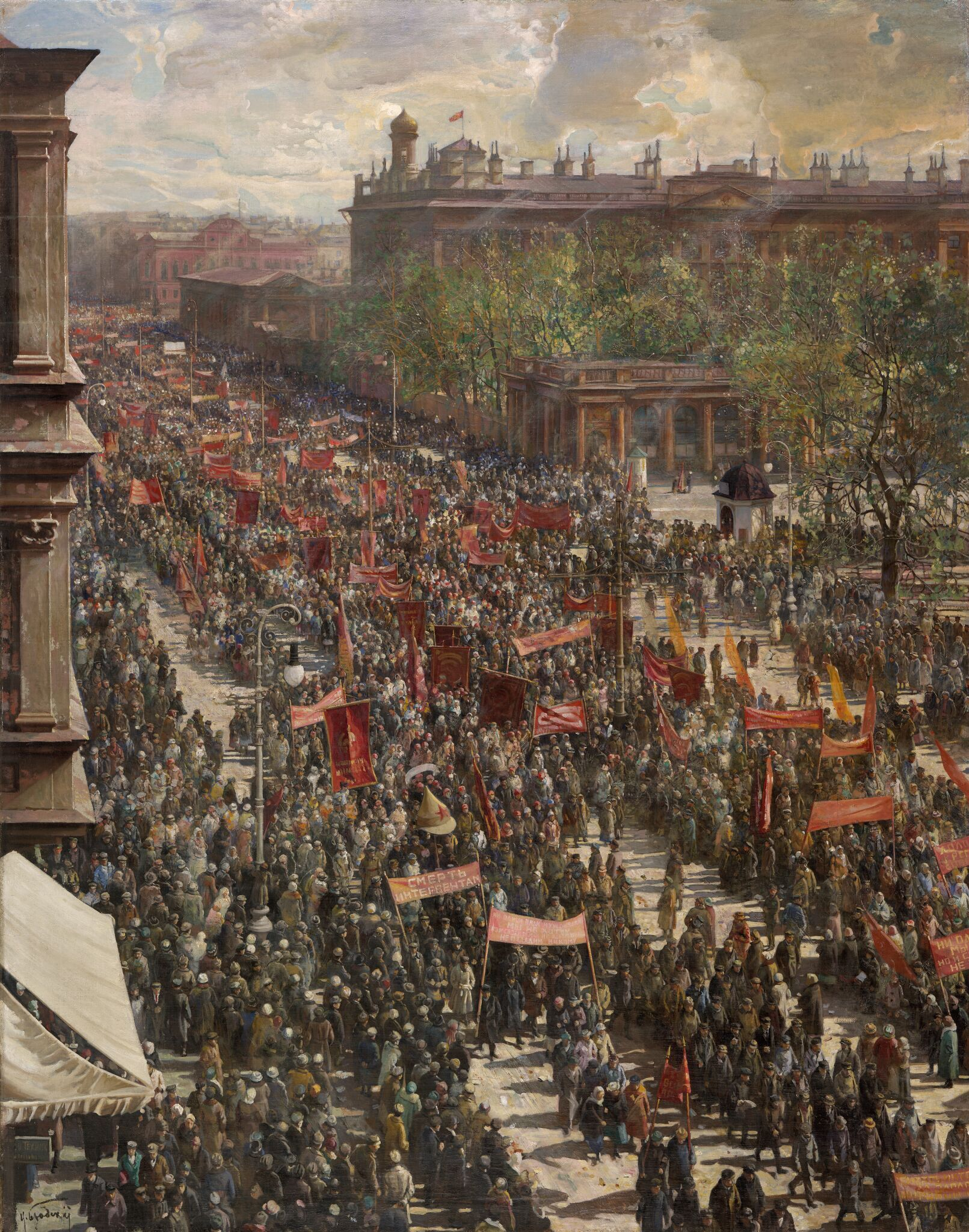
Isaak Brodsky, A Demonstration on 25 October Prospect, 1934; Tretyakov Gallery, Moscow

The fine art of Leningrad is an important component of Russian Soviet art—in the opinion of the art historians Vladimir Gusev and Vladimir Leniashin, "one of its most powerful currents". This widely used term embraces the creative lives and the achievements of several generations of Leningrad painters, sculptors, graphic artists and creators of decorative and applied art from 1917 to the early 1990s.

== 1917–1923 ==
The revolutionary events of 1917–1918 changed the course of artistic life in Petrograd. They affected the Academy of Arts, exhibition and creative life, the activities of artistic associations and questions of artistic practice and theory. At the Academy of Arts students' lessons were interrupted for a year and resumed only in autumn 1918. By a decree of the Council of People's Commissars issue on 12 April 1918 the Academy of Arts in the sense of an assembly of academicians was abolished. By the same decree for the training of future artists instead of the Higher Artistic College (VKhU) the Petrograd State Free Artistic Workshops (PGSKhM) were established. The task of organizing them was entrusted to the Fine Arts department of the People's Commissariat for Education, which was headed by representatives of the "leftists". For 15 years the academy became the arena for an intense struggle over issues of the organization of artistic education and the development of Soviet art. On 12 April 1918 the Council of People's Commissars also adopted a decree "on the monuments of the republic" that has gone down in history as "Lenin's decree on monumental propaganda". The decree called for the removal of memorials erected in honour of the tsars and their servants and the production of monuments to Russia's Socialist revolution.

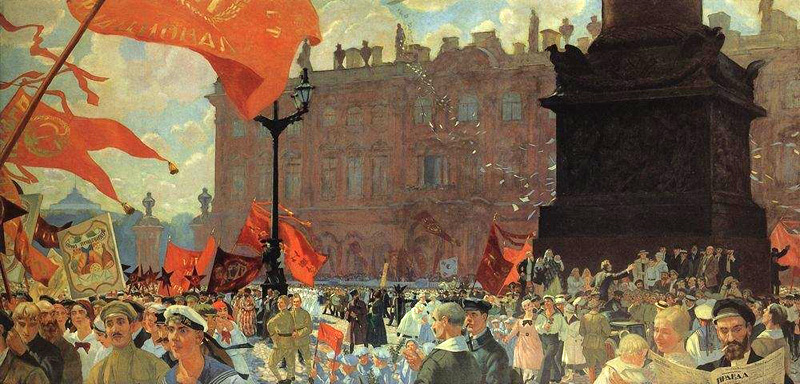
Boris Kustodiev, Celebration Marking the Opening of the 2nd Congress of the Comintern on Uritsky Square in Petrograd on 19 June 1920, 1921

Despite the complications caused by the change of regime, the civil war and foreign intervention, artistic groupings – Mir iskusstva, Peredvizhniki, the Arkhip Kuindzhi Society, the Commune of Artists, and the Society of Individualist Artists – continued to operate in Petrograd. In 1922 the Association of Artists of Revolutionary Russia (AKhRR) was formed and the artist Nikolai Dormidontov became head of its Petrograd branch. Among the participants in exhibitions between 1917 and 1923 were such artists as Nathan Altman, Mikhail Avilov, Isaak Brodsky, Boris Grigoriev, Ilya Repin, Vladimir Makovsky, Nikolay Dubovskoy, Osip Braz, Konstantin Makovsky, Boris Kustodiev, Sergey Konenkov, George Savitsky, Mykola Samokysh, Arkady Rylov, Stanislav Zhukovsky, Vladimir Kuznetsov, Wassily Kandinsky, Alexandre Benois, Vladimir Baranov-Rossine, Pavel Filonov, Kuzma Petrov-Vodkin, Nicholas Roerich, Marc Chagall, Kazimir Malevich, Mstislav Dobuzhinsky, Alexander Kiselyov, Ivan Bilibin, Zinaida Serebriakova, Piotr Buchkin, Yury Annenkov, Rudolf Frentz, Aleksander Golovin and some others. Between them, they represented the main directions and tendencies in contemporary art. Some of them, such as Kazimir Malevich, Wassily Kandinsky, Pavel Filonov, Marc Chagall and Nicholas Roerich were figures of world rank.

Among the most significant works from this period critics name In the Azure Expanse (1918) by Arkady Rylov, Celebration Marking the Opening of the 2nd Congress of the Comintern on Uritsky Square on 19 June 1920 (1921) by Boris Kustodiev, Victory over Eternity (1921) and Living Head (1923) by Pavel Filonov, Portrait of Miron Sherling (1918) by Yury Annenkov, Self-Portrait (1918), Morning Still Life (1918) and Portrait of Anna Akhmatova (1922) by Kuzma Petrov-Vodkin, The Black Square by Kazimir Malevich, and Portrait of Nadezhda Dobychina (1920) by Aleksander Golovin. These works testify to the multi-directional development of Petrograd's fine art, in which various tendencies, styles, and directions were represented by striking leaders.

Among the art exhibitions, the largest were the "First State Free Exhibition of Works of Art", held in the Winter Palace in 1919 with 300 participants, and the "Exhibition of Paintings by Petrograd Artists of All Directions. 1918–1923", held at the Academy of Arts in 1923 with 263 participants. Exhibitions were staged of paintings by members of the Kuindzhi Society, the Commune of Artists, Peredvizhniki and Mir iskusstva, as well as the traditional autumn and spring exhibitions. The venues for them were the halls of the Society for the Encouragement of the Arts, the Academy of Arts, the Museum of the city (the former Anichkov Palace) and the Hermitage. The year 1920 saw one-man exhibitions of Kuzma Petrov-Vodkin and Mstislav Dobuzhinsky.

In 1919 a Museum of Artistic Culture was formed in Petrograd and in 1923 the Institute of Artistic Culture (INKhUK) formed under its auspices, headed by Kazimir Malevich.

In 1922 in Petrograd, on the basis of a private studio foundry, an artistic casting facility was established. Later it was transformed into the Monumentskuptura artistic casting works, which produced monumental art in bronze, granite and marble.

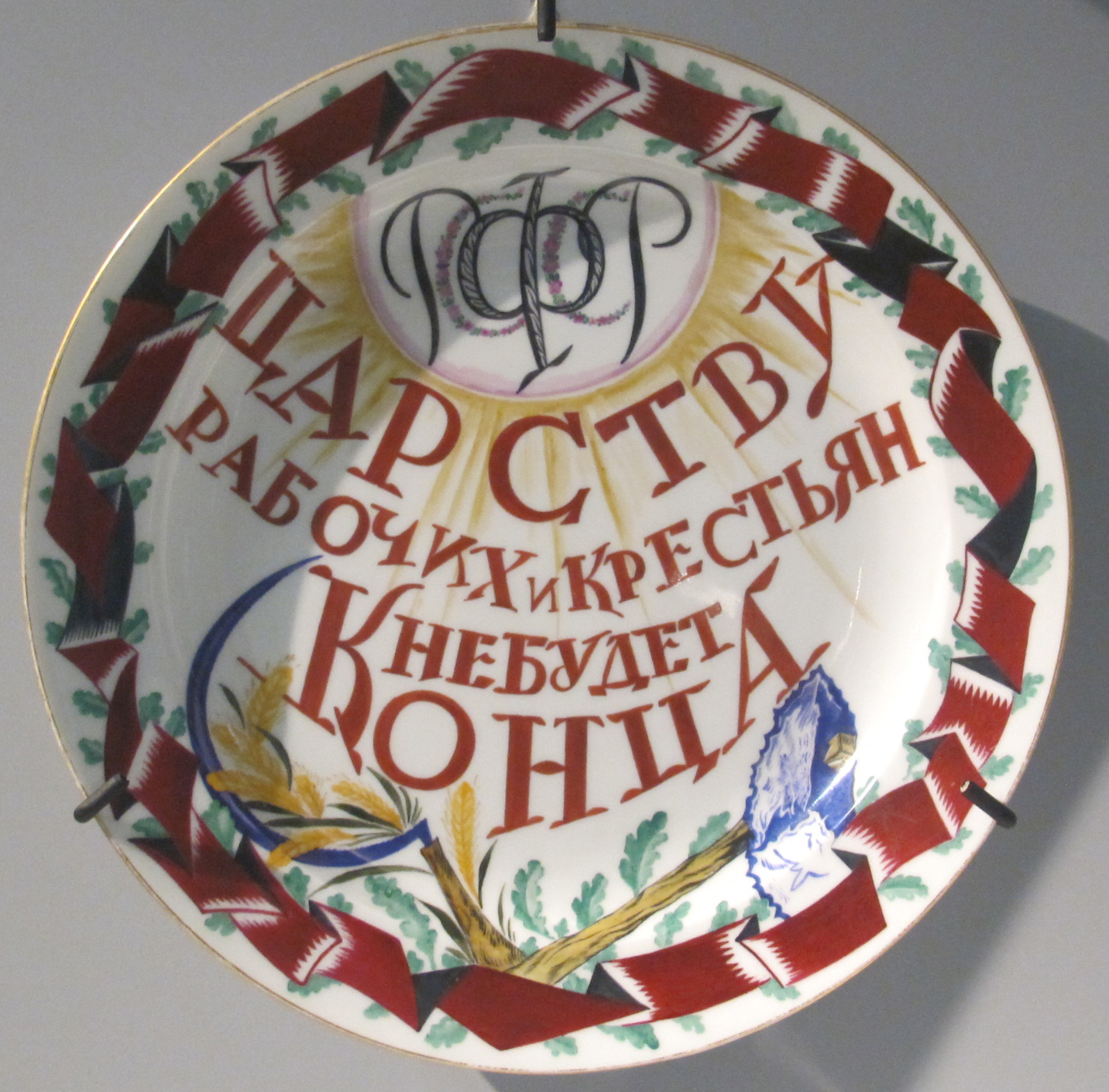
Sergey Chekhonin Kingdom of the workers and peasants will not end. Plate. GFZ. 1920

In this period a Leningrad school of graphic art formed. The cultural revolution created an active readership of many millions, presenting graphic art with new tasks. Petrograd artists became involved in the creation of illustrations for a series of books called "The People's Library". The time produced publications that became the zenith of book art: Pushkin's Bronze Horseman with illustrations by Alexandre Benois and Dostoyevsky's White Nights featuring drawings by Mstislav Dobuzhinsky. Posters as an art form acquired particular topicality and political incisiveness in this period. Notable examples are Nikolai Kochergin's works Everybody to the Defence of Petrograd! (1919) and It's Wrangel's Turn! (1920), as well as the posters known as the "ROSTA Windows". Drawings of Lenin made from life by the artists Nathan Altman, Isaak Brodsky, and Piotr Buchkin became the foundation for a whole genre of "Leniniana" in Soviet fine art.

An innovative line of work was the festive decoration of Petrograd for the early anniversaries of the October Revolution. Among the many people involved were the artists Kuzma Petrov-Vodkin, Boris Kustodiev, Isaak Brodsky, Arkady Rylov, and Nathan Altman, the sculptors Leonid Sherwood and Sarah Lebedeva, the graphic artists Vladimir Lebedev, Mstislav Dobuzhinsky and Sergey Chekhonin, the architects Lev Rudnev and Ivan Fomin. Their ideas and approaches to a large extent determined the characteristics of the nascent new Soviet art of decorating public spaces that answered the call for monumental propaganda.

World fame accrued to Petrograd applied art through the agitation porcelain produced by the State Porcelain Factory (previously the Imperial Porcelain Factory, later the Leningrad Lomonosov Porcelain Factory). The factory was found to have large stocks of unpainted items and the decision was taken to employ them not simply as tableware, but primarily as a vehicle of revolutionary propaganda. The inspiration and "spirit" of the factory's artistic activities was Sergey Chekhonin, who became head of the painting department at the State Porcelain Factory in 1917. His very first works already had an agitation purpose, including the greatest of them – the anniversary dish produced for 25 October 1918 (the coat of arms of the Russian Soviet Federal Socialist Republic worked in flowers). Sergey Chekhonin personally and others working from his drawings painted a large number of plates with slogans and the initials of the RSFSR, dishes, cups and whole services decorated with a pattern of many flowers and gilding. Besides the purely ornamental and allegorical pieces, the factory also produced from Sergey Chekhonin's drawings a series of graphic portraits of the leaders of the world proletariat as well as a large oval dish bearing the autographs of all the most prominent figures of the October Revolution. Artists involved in the creation of agitation porcelain included М. М. Adamovich, N. I. Altman, Alexandra Chekotikhina—Pototskaya, Natalia Danko, Kuzma Petrov-Vodkin, Alexander Samokhvalov, Pavel Kuznetsov and Mstislav Dobuzhinsky.

== 1924–30 ==
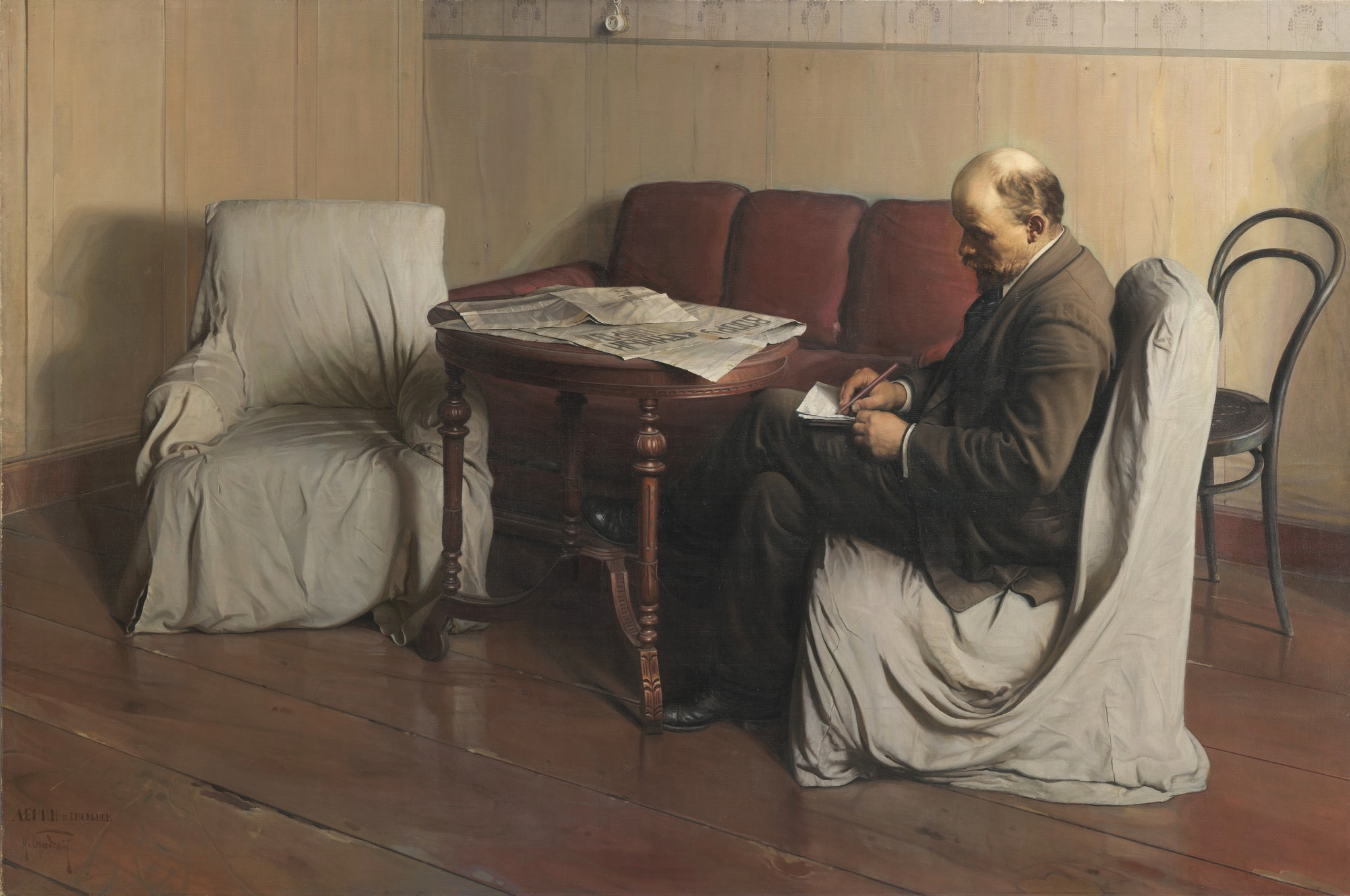
Isaak Brodsky, Lenin in Smolny, 1930

On 21 January 1924 Lenin died. On 26 January, by a resolution of the Second Congress of Soviets of the recently formed USSR, Petrograd was renamed Leningrad. For the fine arts in the city this event had more than merely formal consequences. As early as the summer of 1924 an exhibition was held at the Academy of Arts of competition entries for a monument to Lenin. First prize was awarded to a design by the architect Iosif Langbard in a revolutionary romantic style. On 7 November 1926, the ninth anniversary of the October Revolution, one of the most famous monuments to the Soviet leader was unveiled on the square by the Finland Railway Station (Lenin on the Armoured Car), sculptor Sergey Evseev, architects Vladimir Shchuko and Vladimir Gelfreykh. In 1925 a monument to the assassinated revolutionary V. Volodarsky (created by the sculptors Matvey Manizer and Lina Bleze-Manizer together with the architect Vladimir Vitman) was inaugurated, as was another to the pioneer Russian Marxist Georgy Plekhanov (sculptor Ilya Ginsburg) by the Technological Institute. In 1928 a monument to Dmitri Mendeleev, also by Ginsburg, was set up, again near the Technological Institute. In 1925 a monument to Lenin by the Leningrad sculptor Vasily Kozlov (from 1919 chairman of the Petrograd committee of sculptors, later professor of the sculpture faculty of the Academy of Arts) was set up in the southern Russian city of Taganrog. In 1927 a monument to Lenin by the same sculptor was unveiled in front of the Smolny Institute, which had been the HQ of the October Revolution. These works established a sort of canon for subsequent depictions of Lenin in Soviet art.

The year 1925 was marked by a series of important events for the fine arts in Leningrad. The Institute of Artistic Culture (INKhUK) was converted into the State Institute of Artistic Culture (GINKhUK). Such prominent figures in "leftist" art as Kazimir Malevich, Vladimir Tatlin and Mikhail Matyushin were recruited to head its experimental workshops. That same year Pavel Filonov organized his own group – the "Masters of Analytical Art". Over the course of its existence more than 70 artists participated in its activities (Tatyana Glebova, Boris Gurvich, Sophia Zaklikovskaya, Eugene Kibryck, Pavel Kondratiev, Alise Poret, Andrew Sashin, Mikhail Tsibasov and many others). In 1927 and 1928, two exhibitions of the "Masters of Analytical Art" were held, in the House of the Press and the Academy of Arts.

In the spring of 1926, the art association called the "Circle of Artists" formed in Leningrad. Among its members who subsequently became prominent figures were Viacheslav Pakulin, Alexei Pakhomov, Alexander Samokhvalov, Alise Poret, Alexander Rusakov, Vladimir Malagis, Nikolai Emelianov, Boris Kaplansky, Lev Britanishsky, Yacob Shur, Maria Fedoricheva, Alexander Vedernikov, Vasily Kuptsov, Gerta Nemenova, Mikhail Verbov, Alexey Pochtenny, Naum Mogilevsky, Piotr Osolodkov, George Traugot and Sergei Chugunov. The Circle declared its aim to be commitment to "the style of the epoch". It held three exhibitions in Leningrad, the most significant of them being considered to be the second exhibition of 1928, held in the Russian Museum. It featured around 150 works, mainly paintings. The exhibition functioned for a month and a half, evoking great interest and positive reviews in the press. It was visited by Anatoly Lunacharsky, the People's Commissar for Education.

Among other major exhibitions of the middle to late 1920s were the 8th exhibition of the AKhRR (Association of Artists of Revolutionary Russia) "The Life and Daily Existence of the Peoples of the USSR" (1926, Russian Museum), the "Exhibition of the Latest Tendencies in Art" (1927, Russian Museum, with participants including Wassily Kandinsky, David Burliuk, Vladimir Tatlin, Alexander Osmerkin, Robert Falk, Pyotr Konchalovsky, Mikhail Larionov, Natalia Goncharova and Marc Chagall), the "Jubilee Exhibition of Fine Arts" (1927, Academy of Arts) and "Contemporary Leningrad Artistic Groupings" (1928, Russian Museum). There were also exhibitions of paintings by the Kuindzhi Society, the Commune of Artists, the Society of Individualist Artists and the "4 Arts" association of artists. Leningrad artists participated in a number of exhibitions in Moscow and abroad, including the "Exhibition of Works of Art for the Tenth Anniversary of the October Revolution" (1928, Moscow), the "Exhibition of Paintings by Moscow and Leningrad Artists organized to mark the 25th anniversary of the artistic and teaching activities of Dmitry Kardovsky" (1929, Moscow) and "Contemporary and Applied Art of Soviet Russia" (1929, New York, Philadelphia, Boston, Detroit).

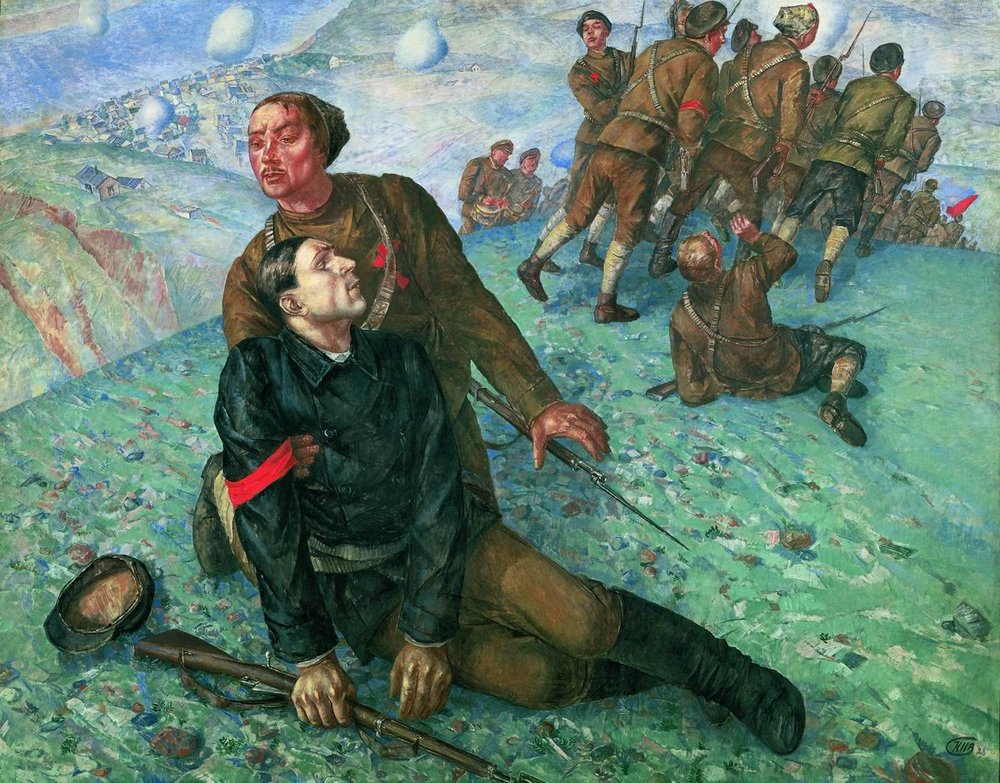
Kuzma Petrov-Vodkin, Death of a Commissar. 1928. Russian Museum

Among the works of this period critics particularly single out the sculptural group October (1927) by Alexander Matveyev and the paintings Death of a Commissar (1928) and Earthquake in the Crimea (1928) by Kuzma Petrov-Vodkin, Formula of Spring (1929) by Pavel Filonov, Portrait of the Poet Mikhail Kuzmin (1925) by Nikolai Radlov, Lenin against the Background of the Kremlin (1924), Mikhail Frunze on Manoeuvres (1929), Lenin in Smolny (1930) and Lenin's Speech at a Meeting of the Workers of the Putilov Factory in May 1917 (1929) by Isaak Brodsky, Forest River (1929) by Arkady Rylov, Meeting of the Village Party Cell (1925) by Yefim Cheptsov, Weaving mill (1930) by Alexander Samokhvalov, portraits of female workers by Alexander Samokhvalov and Alexei Pakhomov.

The applied art of Leningrad in the 1920s was represented by the emblematic fabrics of the Vera Slutskaya Factory, works of the Decorative Institute attached to GINKhUK and, of course, the agitation porcelain. In 1925, at a World Exhibition of Industrial Art in Paris, visitors saw 1,000 examples of this art form and it brought the artists of Leningrad gold medals from the organizers and the recognition of foreign specialists. In these works, the new content of art became consolidated through exquisite painting. It was so significant that it completely overshadowed the utilitarian nature of the tableware basis. The content of this unprecedented art was revolutionary symbols, Soviet emblems, the themes of labour and daily life, lyrical fantasies, images inspired by Russian poetry and folklore, plant motifs and flowers as a symbol of the fresh springtime blossoming of nature and the renewal of life. The artists approached the treatment of these themes with great professional skill, erudition and taste. In the opinion of Natalia Taranovskaya, from a formal viewpoint this art represented "an astonishing amalgam of features of Russian Classicism, romantic and folk traditions, agitation and decorative art, Suprematism and industrial design".

In this period the Leningrad graphic artists produced portraits of figures in the Communist and workers' movement for reproduction with massive print-runs. In 1924 artist Alfred Eberling won a competition for the best portrait of Lenin, after which he made a drawing for banknotes that was later reproduced on Soviet 1937-series currency. In the post-war years Eberling's drawing was used as a watermark on Soviet banknotes of the 1947 and 1957 series.

In the late 1920s a tendency towards the organizational consolidation of Leningrad's creative forces found expression in the creation of the "Zekh Khudozhnikov" in 1930 as a result of the merger of four bodies – the Kuindzhi Society, the Commune of Artists, the Society of Individualist Artists and the Society of Painters. Members' works were shown at the Academy of Arts, at the "First Citywide Exhibition of Fine Arts", with Kuzma Petrov-Vodkin, Mikhail Avilov, Isaak Brodsky, Arkady Rylov, Mikhail Bobyshov, Boris Kustodiev, Alexander Matveyev, Alexei Pakhomov, Alexander Vedernikov, Rudolf Frentz and others participating.

A great loss for Leningrad artists was the death in 1930 of Ilya Repin, whose name was inseparably associated with the Academy of Arts and the fine art of St Petersburg–Petrograd–Leningrad. That event coincided with yet another reorganization of the academic institution undertaken in 1930, as a result of which the Leningrad VKhUTEIN was turned into the Institute of Proletarian Fine Art (INPII). The Moscow VKhUTEIN was united with the Leningrad institute and closed as an independent educational establishment. The man appointed as new rector of the institute was Fyodor Maslov, a former worker of the Chief Administration of Professional Education, whose name rapidly became firmly attached to a regime that saw not only further reformation of the institute, but also the effective destruction of its museum and the elimination of the department of easel painting and the architecture faculty. An advocate of the immediate "proletarianization" of art, Maslov explained the shutting down of the department of easel painting by asserting that "the easel painting has ceased to be a progressive form of fine art."

Students of painting and sculpture were tasked with acquiring simple methods that would enable them to go on to produce standard works on industrial themes. There was no mention of the study of the laws of composition and perspective, of mastering the secrets of drawing and painting technique. By Maslov's order of 14 May 1930, the museum of the Academy of Arts was completely abolished. Its stocks were transferred to the Russian Museum and Hermitage, as well as museums in Kharkov, Lvov, Krasnodar, Khabarovsk, Odessa, Dnepropetrovsk, Novgorod and Feodosia.

== The 1930s ==
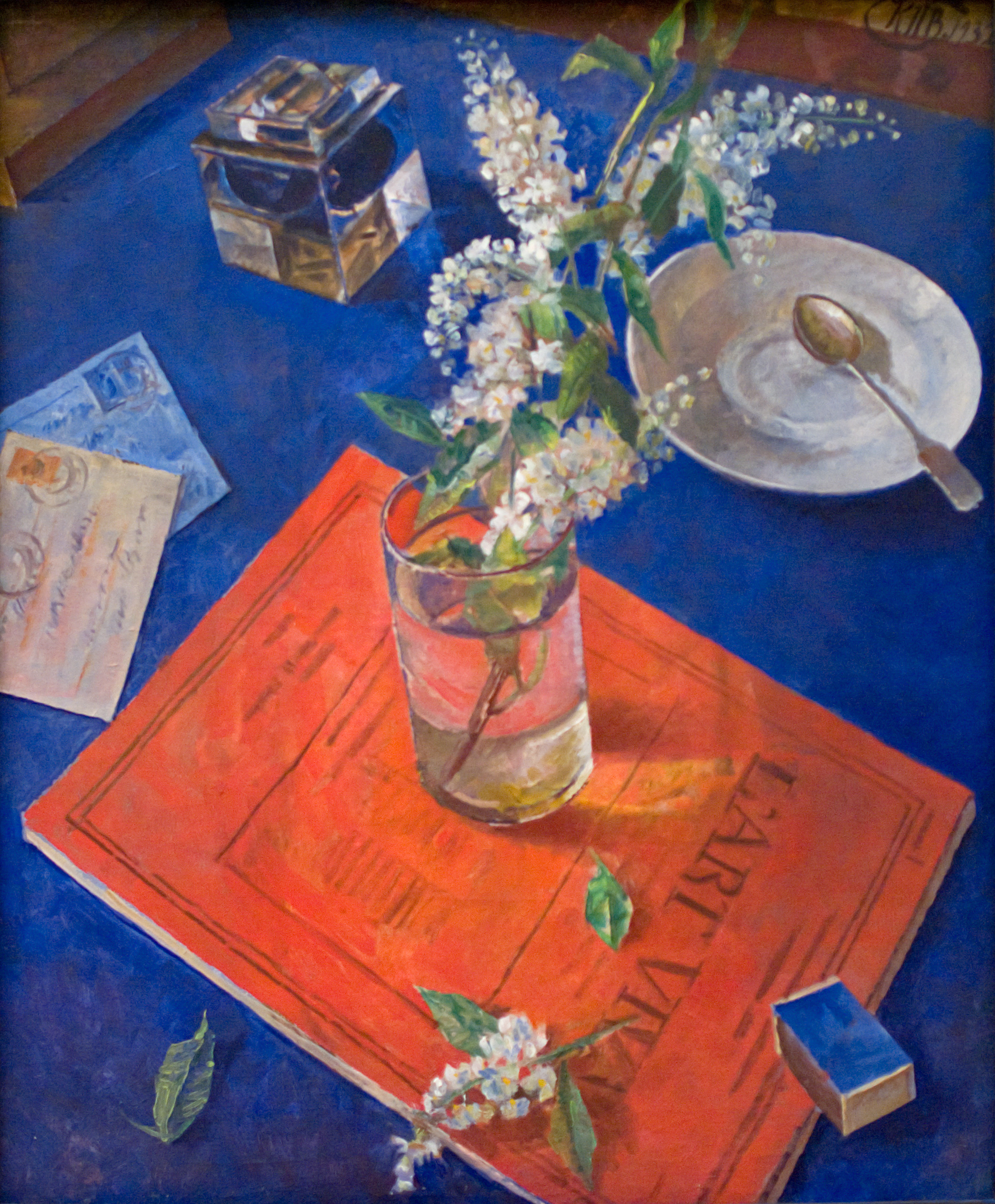
Kuzma Petrov-Vodkin Bird cherry in a glass. 1932. Russian Museum

Yet another reform of the Academy of Arts coincided with the heightened polemics in the early 1930s in the artistic milieu, where there were dozens of competing associations and groups of artists existing at the same time. Many of them, despite high-flown declarations, had no clear platform and were created with the sole purpose of providing their founders with means of subsistence. Others, such as the Association of Artists of Revolutionary Russia ( AKhRR – AKhR) with its almost forty branches, on the contrary laid claim to ideological leadership of the entire artistic movement. In the late 1920s, the purging of the AKhR of "bourgeois elements" resulted in the exclusion of the artists Mikhail Avilov, Isaak Brodsky and Gavriil Gorelov. Later Abram Arkhipov, Rudolf Frentz, Piotr Buchkin, Dmitry Kardovsky, Nikolai Dormidontov and other major painters quit the AKhR. The "Brodsky's Affair", which was dealt with by a special commission of the People's Commissariat for Education, attracted widespread attention. It revealed a picture of intrigues and embittered group fighting, reflecting the abnormal situation that had arisen within art.

Another event that aroused a public response was the scandalous 1931 exhibition in the Russian Museum, which featured "black walls" hung with paintings that the exhibition organizers described as "seditious". Beneath each work there was a special label revealing its "bourgeois essence". In response, within the walls of the Academy of Arts and among Leningrad's artistic community opposition to this deleterious policy for art took shape, also producing resolute criticism of Maslov's regime.

In the spring of 1932, the Central Committee of the Communist Party adopted a resolution "On the reconstruction of literary and artistic organizations". The existing literary and artistic organizations were dissolved to be replaced by single creative unions of artists, writers, theatrical personnel and composers. On 2 August 1932, at a general meeting of Leningrad artists who were members of various societies, a single Leningrad Regional Union of Soviet Artists (LOSSKh) was formed. Painter Kuzma Petrov-Vodkin was elected its first chairman. Soon, by resolution of the Leningrad City Soviet, LOSSKh was given the use of the historical building of the former Society for the Encouragement of the Arts at 38, Herzen Street (today once again Bolshaya Morskaya Street). The city assumed all expenses for the removal of the existing tenants and the refurbishment of the building. The LOSSKh became the creative and professional body that for a period of 60 years united Leningrad artists of all sorts – painters, sculptors, graphic artists, monumental artists, specialists in decorative and applied art, film and theatrical designers and also art historians. The union organized creative, professional and exhibition activities and settled matters relating to the social welfare and material condition of artists. The LOSSKh filled its ranks by inducting the members of the dissolved artistic associations and groups, and later with graduates from the Leningrad Institute of Painting, Sculpture and Architecture (the former Academy of Arts) and other educational establishments in the city.

The first city-level exhibition of Leningrad artists after the formation of the LOSSKh took place in 1935. The display included works by 146 painters, 59 sculptors, 66 graphic artists and 17 porcelain artists. In the painting section among a lot of participants were Rudolf Frentz, Piotr Buchkin, Alexander Samokhvalov, Isaak Brodsky, Kuzma Petrov-Vodkin, Arkady Rylov, Kazimir Malevich, Nikolai Dormidontov, Mikhail Avilov, Nikolai Tyrsa, Eugene Kibryck, Alexei Pakhomov, Alexander Vedernikov, Yefim Cheptsov. Those artists, in the opinion of Valeria Ushakova, drew in their work above all "on the best traditions of the Russian realist school that later came to be called the Leningrad School".

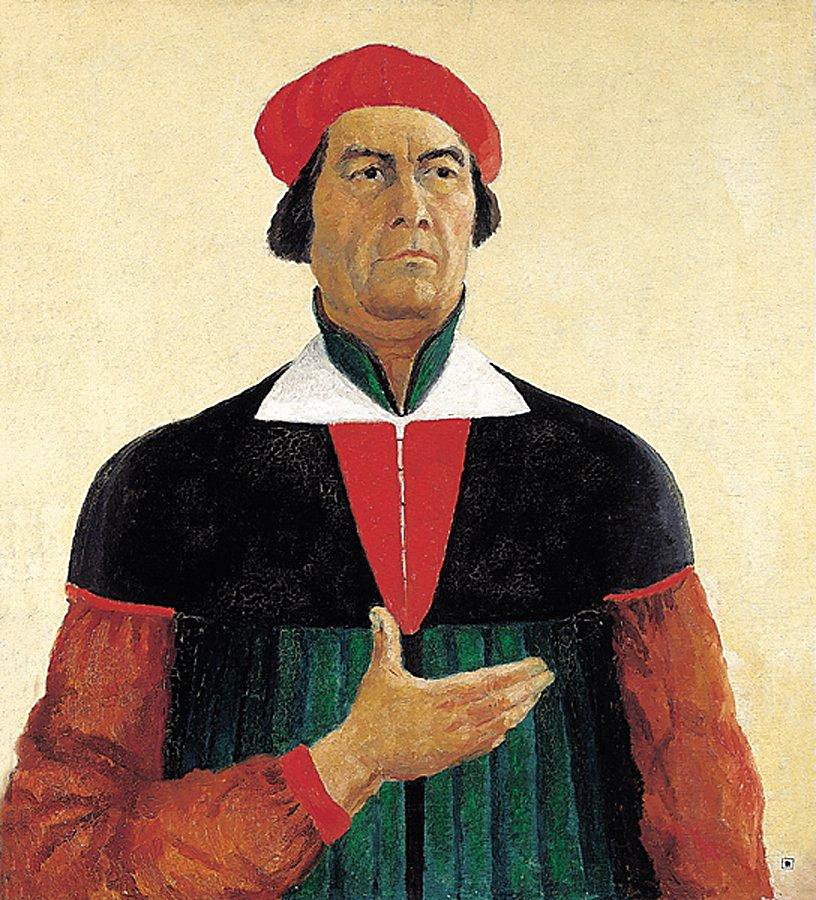
Kazimir Malevich Self-Portrait. 1933. Russian Museum

Other major exhibitions were "Soviet Fine Art of the Reconstructive Period" (1932), "Artists of the RSFSR over 15 years" (1932), "15 Years of the Red Army" (1933), "Woman in Socialist Construction" (1934), all four held in the Russian Museum, "Leningrad in Depictions by Contemporary Artists" (1934, Museum of the city), "An Exhibition of Paintings by Leningrad Artists" (1935, Vsekokhudozhnik, Moscow) and "The Jubilee Exhibition dedicated the 175th Anniversary of the formation of the Russian Academy of Arts" (1939, Academy of Arts). Exhibitions were regularly held in the LOSSKh – Leningrad Union of Soviet Artists (named LSSKh since 1937), as were exhibitions of the graduation pieces of the Leningrad Institute of Painting, Sculpture and Architecture. Particularly notable among the solo exhibitions were retrospectives of Isaak Brodsky (1934, Moscow, Leningrad), Arkady Rylov (1934, Academy of Arts), Kuzma Petrov-Vodkin (1936, Moscow, Leningrad), Anna Ostroumova-Lebedeva (1940, Russian Museum) and personal exhibitions in the LSSKh of Vladimir Konashevich, Dmitry Mitrohin, Mikhail Avilov, Alexander Vedernikov, Nathan Altman, Pavel Basmanov, Aleksander Golovin, Elizaveta Kruglikova, Victor Zamiraylo, Ivan Drozdov, Leonid Ovsannikov and others.

In October 1932 the All-Union Central Executive Committee and the Council of People's Commissars adopted a resolution "On the creation of the Academy of Arts" The Leningrad Institute of Proletarian Fine Art was transformed into the Institute of Painting, Sculpture and Architecture (LIZhSA) and a line was drawn under a 15-year period of continuous transformation of that educational establishment. Still it required a few more years to gather the scattered teaching forces and construct artistic education anew. This process was begun by the academy's new director, the sculptor Alexander Matveyev, and his deputy for educational work, Professor of Painting Alexander Savinov. They invited Dmitry Kardovsky, Alexander Osmerkin, Semion Abugov, Eugene Lanceray, Pavel Shillingovsky, Isaak Brodsky, and Nikolai Radlov to join the faculty and between them those professors did much to revive the academy's role in training art specialists.

In 1934 Isaak Brodsky, a pupil of Ilya Repin, was appointed director of the institute and of the All-Russian Academy of Arts (VAKh). Brodsky enlisted to teach at the institute some major artists and educators: Konstantin Yuon, Pavel Naumov, Boris Ioganson, Alexander Lubimov, Rudolf Frentz, Piotr Buchkin, Nikolai Petrov, Victor Sinaysky, Vasily Shukhaev, Dmitry Kiplik, Nikolay Punin, Vasily Meshkov, Mikhail Bernshtein, Yefim Cheptsov, Ivan Bilibin, Matvey Manizer, Anna Ostroumova-Lebedeva, Alexei Karev, Leonid Ovsannikov, Sergei Priselkov, Ivan Stepashkin, Konstantin Rudakov and more. Training for the future artists was founded upon mastery of drawing, composition and painting, as well as a study of the history of art. The system of individual creative studios in which students continued their education after the second year was reinstated. In the painting faculty the studios were headed by Isaak Brodsky, Boris Ioganson, Vasily Yakovlev, Dmitry Kardovsky, Alexander Osmerkin, Alexander Savinov, Rudolf Frentz, Pavel Shillingovsky and Mikhail Bobyshov.

In the late 1930s the first graduates of the revitalized Academy were the artists Yuri Neprintsev, Piotr Belousov, Nikolai Timkov, Aleksei Gritsai, Mikhail Zheleznov, Aleksandr Laktionov, Piotr Vasiliev, Anatoli Yar-Kravchenko, Mikhail Kozell (studio of Isaak Brodsky), Dmitry Mochalsky, Alexander Debler, Ludmila Ronchevskaya, Mariam Aslamazian, Ivan Kalashnikov, Nikolai Andriako (studio of Alexander Savinov), Gleb Savinov, Elena Skuin, Zalman Zaltsman, Timofey Ksenofontov, Olga Bogaevskaya and Evgenia Baykova (studio of Alexander Osmerkin). Many of them became not only eminent painters, but also educators, who taught more than one generation of young artists.

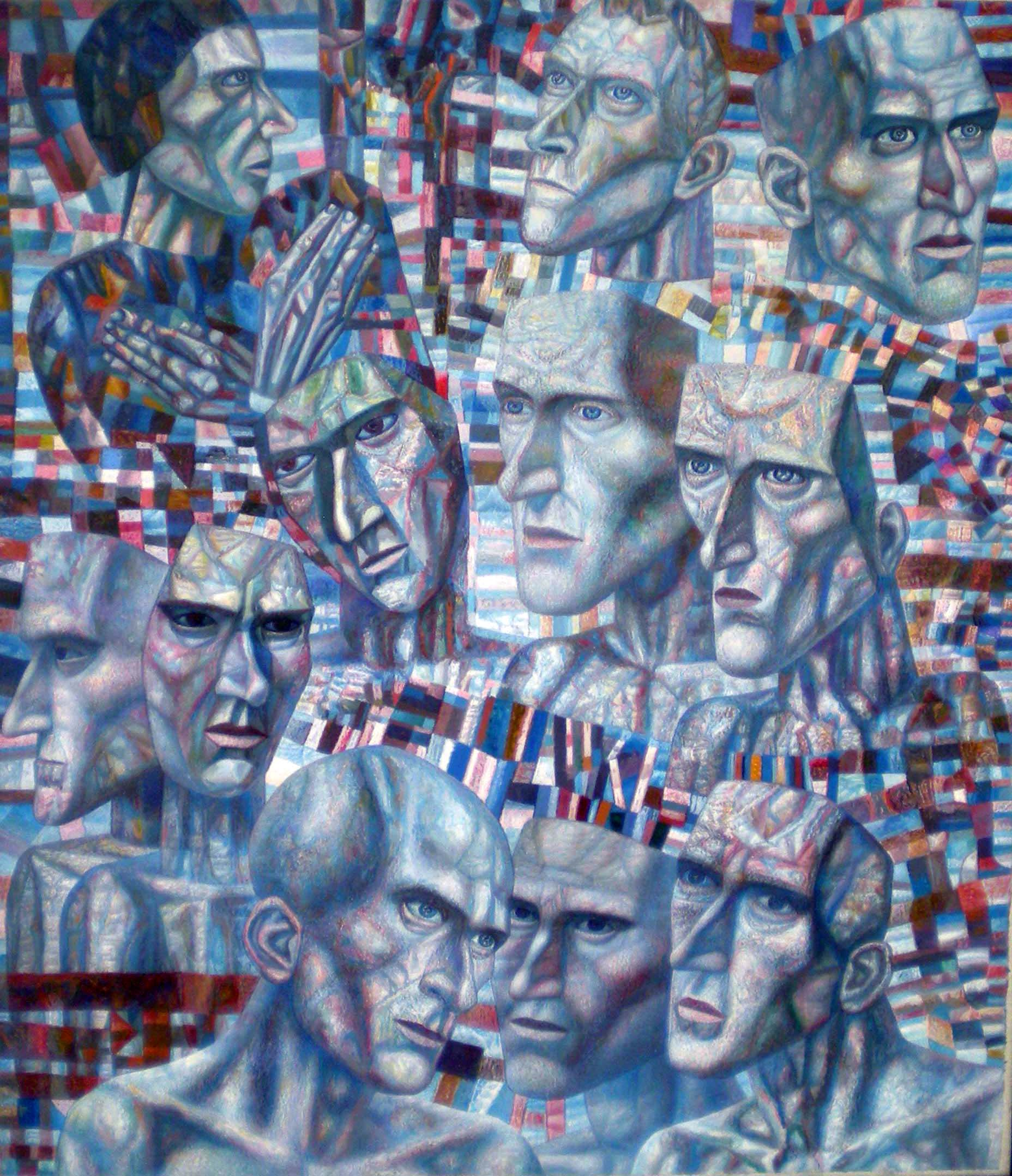
Pavel Filonov Shock-workers. 1935

One of the consequences of the consolidation of creative forces and the reform of the academy was a strengthening of the role of easel and monumental painting and, particularly, the thematic picture among the other types and genres of Leningrad art. Such works firmly occupied a central place at exhibitions. Among the creations of Leningrad artists in the 1930s, critics single out the paintings Girl in a Sport Shirt (1932), Woman – metro's builder with a drill (1937), The Komsomol on a War Footing (1933), Sergei Kirov Taking a Parade of Athletes (1935) and Female Delegates (1939) by Alexander Samokhvalov, Bird Cherry in a Glass (1932) and Alarm (1934) by Kuzma Petrov-Vodkin, Portrait of the Artist Tatyana Shishmareva (1934) by Vladimir Lebedev, In Green Banks (1938) by Arkady Rylov, Nude (1937) by Nikolai Tyrsa, Portrait of Maxim Gorky (1937) by Isaak Brodsky, Self-Portrait (1933) by Kazimir Malevich, Mikhil Yudin, a Hero of the Soviet Union, Visiting Tankmen (1938) by Aleksandr Laktionov, Shock Workers (1935) by Pavel Filonov, and the urban landscapes of Vladimir Grinberg, Nikolai Lapshin and Alexander Vedernikov.

The most famous works by Leningrad sculptors include the monument to Kirov in Leningrad (1938) created by Nikolai Tomsky, the sculptural composition Lenin in Razliv (1935) by Veniamin Pinchuk, monuments of Lenin in Petrozavodsk (1933), Minsk (1933) and Ulyanovsk (1940), to Chapayev in Samara (1932), and to Taras Shevchenko in Kharkov (1935) and Kiev (1938) by Matvey Manizer, and the same sculptor's monument to the victims of 9 January 1905 in Leningrad (1931).

In the mid-1930s in Leningrad a unique system of elementary and secondary art education for children took shape in Leningrad. In 1934 a School of Young Talents was organized under the auspices of the Academy of Arts, which was soon transformed into the Secondary Art School (SKhSh) attached to the Academy of Arts. It was also given a boarding section. Among the school's alumni in the pre-war years were the future distinguished Leningrad artists and sculptors Alexei Eriomin, Vecheslav Zagonek, Mikhail Anikushin, Nikolai Kochukov, Iya Venkova, Evgenia Antipova, Anatoli Levitin, Yuri Tulin, Dmitry Buchkin, Vladimir Chekalov, Marina Kozlovskaya, Elena Kostenko, Abram Grushko, Oleg Lomakin, Vera Lubimova and many others. Children's art schools and studios appeared attached to Leningrad's Palace of Pioneers and in the majority of the city's districts. Besides drawing they taught the basics of painting, composition and the history of the arts. The lessons were given by professional artists, some of them graduates of the academy.

In the 1930s the development of fine art and artistic education was accompanied by arguments and debates about the course and methods of training young artists, about genres, about the attitude to tendencies in European art and about the method of Socialist Realism. These discussions, into which young artists also became drawn, furthered the revelation of creative personalities and were an important factor in the formation of Leningrad art.

The successes of Leningrad artists in the field of book and easel graphic art were due to the works of George Vereysky, Nikolau Radlov, Pavel Basmanov, Vladimir Konashevich, Nikolai Tyrsa, Alexander Samokhvalov, Eugene Kibryck, Alexei Pakhomov, Vladimir Lebedev, Anna Ostroumova-Lebedeva, Pavel Shillingovsky, Yuri Vasnetsov, Eugene Charushin, Konstantin Rudakov, Gennady Epifanov, Sergei Mochalov, Ivan Bilibin and others. Alexander Samokhvalov's illustrations for Saltykov-Shchedrin's novel The History of a Town were awarded the grand prix at the 1937 Paris Exposition. At that same event a gold medal was awarded to Vladimir Konashevich's illustrations for Abbé Prévost's novella Manon Lescaut. Among the notable achievements of Soviet graphic art in this period are Konstantin Rudakov's illustrations for Maupassant's Bel Ami and Eugene Kibryck's illustrations for Romain Rolland's Colas Breugnon and Charles de Coster's Legend of Thyl Ulenspiegel.

In 1939 a team of artists called the "Boyevoy karandash" ("Fighting Pencil") was formed within the LSSKh. Its initial members were the graphic artists Ivan Astapov, Orest Vireysky, Valentin Kirdov, Vladimir Galba, Nikolai Muratov and Boris Semionov. A first collective poster was issued on the subject of the Winter War against Finland.

The immediate pre-war Leningrad exhibitions of 1940–41, in Abram Raskin's opinion, refute assertions that the output of Leningrad's artists was completely subordinated to political dictate and crushed by ideological pressure. In many works of landscape, portrait and study painting, purely artistic tasks were set and successfully accomplished.

== The War and Siege ==
In the years of the Great Patriotic War of 1941–1945, Leningrad fine art was quite literally "in the front line of the fight against the enemy". In the very first days following the Nazi invasion on 22 June 1941, artists joined in preparing more than a million exhibits from the stocks of the Hermitage and Russian Museum for evacuation. The first train carrying them left for the East on 1 July. An even greater quantity of museum items were moved into temporary storage places. Tremendous work was carried out to protect and camouflage sculptural monuments, military, civic and industrial objects. The production of posters and wartime leaflets began. Artists participated in the construction of defensive installations and served in air raid defence units. Publication of the "Boyevoy karandash" ("Fighting Pencil") was resumed. As early as 24 June Vladimir Serov's poster We Have Beaten, Are Beating and Will Beat! appeared on the streets of Leningrad and in the window of the former Yeliseyev Shop on Nevsky Prospekt the first issue of the "TASS Windows" was put on display. In all, during the war years the "Fighting Pencil" produced 103 posters with print-runs between 3,000 and 15,000 copies, executed in the traditions of the lubok popular print, politically sharp and inventive.

In the very hardest months of the siege, to preserve their lives a proportion of the artists were placed under barracks conditions in the academy and in the premises of the Artists' Union at 38, Herzen Street. In December 1941, 38 students presented diploma works at the academy, some of them being temporarily recalled from the front to do so. In February 1942 staff and students of the academy and Secondary School of Art were evacuated to Samarkand, where the educational process continued. The institute returned from evacuation on 18 July 1944, while on 14 July it was given the name of Ilya Repin by resolution of the government of the USSR.

During the war close to every third member of the LOSSKh perished. Authors differ on the exact numbers. Olga Roitenberg, for example, writes about 550 lives lost to the war and the siege, while admitting that this sad figure is far from definitive. Among the dead were Alexander Savinov, Pavel Filonov, Pavel Shillingovsky, Ivan Bilibin, Nikolai Lapshin, Vladimir Grinberg, Nikolai Tyrsa and Alexei Karev. Even more devastating were the losses among young artists and students. Yet the Artists' Union was gaining new members, among them the young Nikolai Timkov, Sergei Osipov, Evgenia Baykova, Gleb Savinov, Nikolai Pilshikov and other Leningrad painters and graphic artists who would become well known in future.

It is symbolic that in October 1943 medal number one Medal "For the Defence of Leningrad" was awarded to the Academy of Arts student Nikolai Pilshikov (1914–1983), who entered the war as an air force pilot. While he flew missions on a par with others, from the first weeks of the war his gifted portrait sketches of the defenders of Leningrad's skies became widely known in the city. Later postcards were made of his works and in early 1942 the Iskusstvo publishing house put out an album of Pilshikov's portraits of celebrated air aces. It was presented along with Hero of the Soviet Union certificates to servicemen on the Leningrad front. The gallery of heroes that the artist created is of great historical and artistic value. They include the pilot Piotr Kharitonov, who was one of the first in the war to be awarded the title of Hero of the Soviet Union, Timur Frunze, the son of a Civil War hero, the famous female pilot Valentina Grizodubova, twice Hero of the Soviet Union Piotr Pokryshev and the defender of the "Road of Life" Alexei Sevastyanov. In 1942, on the recommendation of George Vereysky and Anna Ostroumova-Lebedeva, Nikolai Pilshikovwas accepted into the LSSKh.

During the war and siege, exhibition activity continued in Leningrad. Such events bolstered the morale of the inhabitants and defenders of the beleaguered city and inspired confidence in victory over the enemy. On 2 January 1942, "in the most terrible winter of the siege, when the building was frozen to its foundations and the walls were covered with rime", the "First Exhibition of Works by Leningrad Artists during the Great Patriotic War" opened in the Artists' Union and was later shown in the Pushkin Museum in Moscow. It featured works by 84 artists, including Ivan Bilibin, Vladimir Grinberg, Vera Isaeva, Anatoli Kazantsev, Yaroslav Nikolaev, Veniamin Pinchuk, Vecheslav Pakulin, Victor Proshkin, Varvara Raevskaya-Rutkovskaya, Nikolai Rutkovsky, Joseph Serebriany, Vladimir Serov and Nikolai Tyrsa, that became historical evidence of the era and of the indomitable will of Leningraders.

Later there were three exhibitions of artists of the Leningrad front (1943–45, Russian Museum, Academy of Arts) and the exhibitions "In the Battles for Leningrad" (1942, House of the Red Army), "25 Years of the Red Army" (1943, House of the Red Army), the spring exhibition (1943, LSSKh), the "Exhibition of Five" (1944, Russian Museum), "Exhibition of studies" (1945, LSSKh) and personal shows by Samuil Nevelshtein, Leonid Ovsannikov, Vladimir Konashevich, Piotr Lugansky and others. The largest wartime exhibition, devoted to "The Heroic Defence of Leningrad", opened on 30 April 1944 in Solyany Lane and gave the start to the legendary Museum of the Defence of Leningrad. Then in February 1945, in the same place, on the basis of the former Baron Stieglitz College of Technical Drawing, the Leningrad College of Art and Industry was opened, which soon turned into the Mukhina Higher College of Art and Industry. The college embarked on the training of specialist artists to restore the palace and park ensembles of Leningrad and its suburbs destroyed in the war.

Among the works created by Leningrad artists during the war, critics particularly note the paintings Self-Portrait (1942) and To the Outside World (1945) by Yaroslav Nikolaev, Partisan Detachment. Lesgaft Institute Skiers (1942) by Joseph Serebriany, An Urgent Order for the Front (1942) by Nikolai Dormidontov, The Duel on Kulikovo Field (1943) by Mikhail Avilov, The Breach of the Siege of Leningrad on 18 January 1943 (1943) by Anatoli Kazantsev, Joseph Serebriany, and Vladimir Serov, Nikolai Timkov's Leningrad under Siege series of landscapes (1942–44), series of graphic works by Alexei Pakhomov and Solomon Yudovin, and other works.

The war had an enormous impact on Soviet society and its fine art, determining many important aspects of its development. That period also engendered a special attitude to Leningrad and Leningraders. The exceptional character of the military and human drama that the city experienced had its effect on the work of Leningrad artists, who were destined to write a special chapter in the post-war history of fine art.

== 1946–60 ==
The make-up of the Leningrad Union of Soviet Artists (LSSKh) and of participants in post-war Leningrad exhibitions was substantially rejuvenated by LIZhSA graduates of the pre-war years, as well as those who were only now able to complete studies interrupted by the war. They were Mikhail Anikushin, Nukolai Andretsov, Taisia Afonina, Evgenia Baykova, Konstantin Belokurov, Piotr Belousov, Olga Bogaevskaya, Anatoli Vasiliev, Nina Veselova, Igor Veselkin, Rostislav Vovkushevsky, Ivan Godlevsky, Meta Drayfild, Alexander Dashkevich, Yuri Neprintsev, Gleb Savinov, Nikolai Timkov, Vasily Sokolov, Sergei Osipov, Mikhail Natarevich, Evsey Moiseenko, Andrei Mylnikov, Genrikh Pavlovsky, Lia Ostrova, Mikhail Zheleznov, Lev Orekhov, Alexei Eriomin, Elena Skuin, Yuri Podlasky, Tatiana Kopnina, Nikita Medovikov, Victor Teterin, Nikolai Mukho, Alexander Pushnin, Evgenia Antipova, Alexei Mozhaev, Nadezhda Shteinmiller, Arseny Semionov, Alexander Koroviakov, Valery Pimenov, Maria Rudnitskaya, Yuri Tulin, Nikolai Brandt, Semion Rotnitsky, and many others. From that time on they were destined to become the vanguard of Leningrad art.

In the 1950s the (LSSKh) took in a large contingent of artists who had not begun their studies until after the war, including front-line veterans, who were permitted to enter the institute without examinations. This new influx included Leonid Baykov, Nikolai Baskakov, Dmitry Belyaev, Sergei Buzulukov, Nikolai Galakhov, Abram Grushko, Vecheslav Zagonek, Alexei Eriomin, Boris Korneev, Marina Kozlovskaya, Elena Kostenko, Anna Kostina, Yaroslav Krestovsky, Valeria Larina, Anatoli Levitin, Boris Lavrenko, Ivan Lavsky, Piotr Litvinsky, Oleg Lomakin, Mikhail Kaneev, Yuri Khukhrov, Maya Kopitseva, Engels Kozlov, Edvard Virzhikovsky, Leonid Kabachek, Eugene Maltsev, Konstantin Molteninov, Anatoli Nenartovich, Avenir Parkhomenko, George Pesis, Vsevolod Petrov-Maslakov, Nikolai Pozdneev, Igor Razdrogin, Victor Reykhet, Vladimir Sakson, Vladimir Seleznev, Vladimir Tokarev, Mikhail Trufanov, Boris Ugarov, Leonid Fokin, Piotr Fomin, Vladimir Chekalov, and many others. While continuing to work on the narrative-directorial side of painting, they began to make more active use of the specific devices of their own art form, above all colour and plasticity. Orientation on the Itinerants was increasingly supplemented by an interest in such figures as Konstantin Korovin, Valentin Serov and the members of the Union of Russian Artists with their culture of plein-air painting and studies from life.

Works from 1945 to 1949, including some diploma pieces by Academy graduates, saw the first real successes in artistically generalizing the theme of the great feat accomplished by the entire nation in the war. Among them were In Memory of the Heroes of the Baltic Fleet (1946) by Andrei Mylnikov, The Girls of the Donbass (1946) by Taisia Afonina, The Road of Life (1946) by Alexei Kuznetsov, German Prisoners (1946) by Piotr Puko, The Victors (1947) by Franz Zaborovsky, A Wounded Commander (1947) by Alexander Koroviakov, General Dovator (1947) by Evsey Moiseenko, Landing Force (1947) by Elena Tabakova and Liberated Kishinev (1947) by Stepan Privedentsev. In Zagorsk in 1947, Aleksandr Laktionov, a graduate of Isaak Brodsky's studio, completed the painting Letter from the Front (Tretyakov Gallery, Stalin Prize 1st class for 1948) that has gone down in the history of the nation's art as an astonishingly bright image of the Victory, so desired and close. In 1951 another of Isaak Brodsky's pupils, Yuri Neprintsev, produced the no less famous work Rest after Battle (Tretyakov Gallery, Stalin Prize 1st class for 1952).

The theme of post-war reconstruction found reflection in the paintings In the Peaceful Fields (1950, Russian Museum, Stalin Prize 3rd class for 1951) by Andrei Mylnikov, Rebirth (1950) by Mikhail Natarevich, Portrait of the Composer Solovyev-Sedoi (1950) by Joseph Serebriany, Leningrad to the Builders of Communism. In the Hydro-Turbine Shop of the Stalin Works (1951) by Nina Veselova, Vecheslav Zagonek, Alexander Pushnin, Yefim Rubin and Yuri Tulin, Here the Kuibyshev Hydroelectric Power Station Will Be (1951) by Nikolai Galakhov, Two Great Building Projects. A Meeting of the Scientific and Technical Board of the Elektrosila Works (1951) by Leonid Tkachenko, An Exchange of Stakhanovite Experience (1951) by Anatoli Levitin, and Collective Farm Spring (1951) by Boris Ugarov.

The artists shared the same interests and problems as the people. They strove to make their contribution to the general efforts, not to stand apart. This is indicated by the discussions and deliberations that took place in 1945–1947 in the Leningrad Artists' Union. They raised pressing issues of the artistic standard of works and the provision of commissions, studios, and art materials.

In the contracted works of painters and sculptors, a significant place was occupied by the historical revolutionary theme. Examples include Lenin among the Delegates of the 3rd Congress of the Komsomol (1949) and We Shall Take a Different Course (1951) by Piotr Belousov, Stalin and Lenin in Razliv (1950) by Yaroslav Nikolaev, Messengers with Lenin (1950) by Vladimir Serov, Stalin and Voroshilov on the Tsaritsyn Front (1950) by Rudolf Frentz, Stalin in the HQ of the Supreme Commander-in-Chief (1949) by Valery Pimenov and Stalin in Exile in Narym (1949) by Victor Teterin. At the same time, the facts demonstrate that the role of works belonging to this genre was not dominant in the fine art of the 1950s. For example, of the 177 works by Leningrad painters presented at the All-Union Art Exhibition marking the 40th anniversary of the Great October Socialist Revolution (Moscow, 1957) only ten were devoted to the Lenin theme (5.5%). For comparison, eight paintings were still lifes, while 61 (34%) were landscapes.

Among the most significant achievements of Leningrad artists in this period, critics name the paintings Furnaceman (1955) by Mikhail Trufanov, The Lena. 1912 (1957) by Yuri Tulin, Campfires (1957) by Vasily Sokolov, University Embankment (1957) by Gleb Savinov, The First Cavalry Army (1957) by Evsey Moiseenko, A Warm Day (1957) by Anatoli Levitin, Portrait of the Collective Farm Chairman M. Dolgov (1959) by Nina Veselova, Morning (1960) by Vecheslav Zagonek, The Opening Up of the North (1960) by Boris Korneev, They Were Beginning the Bratsk Hydroelectric Power Station (1960) by Yuri Podlasky, In the Leningrad Philharmonia. 1942 (1959) Portrait of F. Bezuglov, Smelter of the Krasny Vyborzhets Works (1960) by Joseph Serebriany, and Holiday in Voronovo (1960) by Nina Veselova and Leonid Kabachek. They giftedly embody the image of contemporaries in the era of Khrushchev's "thaw" with its conceptions about the revolution, the past and present, with the tremendous scale of construction projects and the achievements of Soviet science and technology.

In this period a number of landscape painters positively attracted the public's attention, including Vladimir Ovchinnikov, Nikolai Timkov, Sergei Osipov, George Tatarnikov, Dmitry Maevsky, Vecheslav Zagonek, Nikolai Galakhov, Alexander Guliaev and Vsevolod Bazhenov. In their work panoramic landscapes traditional for Russian painting became popular. And although in the first post-war decade many artists continued to evolve in a direction marked out in their student days, their efforts to vary the painterly-plastic devices used to produce an image became ever more obvious. The circle of traditions that Leningrad artists were drawing upon grew wider. Edging out the historical painting, there was a rapid upsurge in this period in portraiture, the still life and genre pieces, while the study was reinstated in its rights. As a result, such talented painters as Evgenia Antipova, Vladimir Tokarev, Lev Russov, Oleg Lomakin, Mikhail Trufanov, Boris Korneev, Arseny Semionov, Victor Teterin, Elena Skuin, Gevork Kotiantz, and Maya Kopitseva were able to realize themselves in those genres. Their work became a noticeable phenomenon in painting in the 1960s–80s, substantially enriching it in terms of genre and style.

In 1946–1952 the fine arts in Leningrad experienced first-hand the consequences of the Communist Party Central Committee's resolution on the magazines Zvezda and Leningrad and the "Leningrad Affair". Crude attempts at administrative intervention and savage repressions had a painful effect on the artistic intelligentsia. Professor Alexander Osmerkin was dismissed as head of a studio at the LIZhSA. The art scholar Nikolay Punin was removed from his post and sent to the Gulag, where he soon died. Everything connected with the heroic defence of Leningrad came under a taboo. The museum of the defence, filled with the works of artists and, in essence, created by them, was closed. Art, including the fine arts, was subjected to senseless regulation. This went on until 1954, when the political intrigue against Leningrad was exposed and the innocent victims were rehabilitated.

By 1957 the membership of the LSSKh was three times the pre-war figure. The annual exhibitions of Leningrad artists that were held in the halls of the LSSKh and the Russian Museum had up to 600 participants. Among the largest were the "Summary Exhibition of Works by Leningrad Artists" (1948, LSSKh ), the "Summary Exhibition of Works of Painting, Sculpture and Graphic Art for 1947–48" (1949, LSSKh), the "Exhibition of Works by Leningrad Artists Marking the 40th Anniversary of the Great October Socialist Revolution" (1957, Russian Museum), the autumn exhibitions of 1956 and 1958 in the LSSKh and the "200 Years of the USSR Academy of Arts" exhibition (1957, Academy of Arts). Major events were the personal exhibitions of Mikhail Bobyshov (1952), Victor Oreshnikov (1955), Alexander Savinov (1956), Nikolai Timkov, Alexander Rusakov, Mikhail Platunov (all in 1957), Yaroslav Nikolaev and Piotr Belousov (1958). Leningrad art was strongly represented at the leading exhibitions in Moscow, including the All-Union Jubilee Exhibition of 1957, the exhibitions "40 Years of the Soviet Armed Forces" and "40 Years of the Komsomol" in 1958, as well as the first republican exhibition "Soviet Russia" in 1960.

Leningrad artists made a major contribution to the preparation and work of the first All-Union Congress of Soviet Artists in Moscow in 1957 and to the foundation of the Artists' Union of Russia in 1960. That same year the LSSKh was transformed into the Leningrad branch of the Artists' Union of the RSFSR (LOSKh RSFSR). In 1958 the Khudozknik RSFSR ("Artist of the RSFSR") publishing house was formed in Leningrad. Construction of fixed studios and housing for artists was expanded.

The greatest achievements of Leningrad sculptors were the monument to Pushkin on the Square of Arts (1957, sculptor Mikhail Anikushin), the memorial ensemble at the Piskarevskoye Cemetery (1960, sculptors Vera Isaeva, Boris Kapliansky, Abram Malakhin, Mikhail Whyman, Robert Taurit, Maria Kharlamova and architects Eugene Levinson, Alexander Vasiliev) and the monument to Alexander Griboyedov (1959, sculptor Vsevolod Lishev).

The 1950s Leningrad school of artistic glass is associated with the Leningrad Artistic Glassworks that opened in 1948, works by glass artists at the Mukhina Higher College and the pioneering creations of Boris Smirnov. Among the leading figures in this field critics name Yuri Muntian, Maria Vertuzaeva, Leyda Yurgen, Lidia Smirnova, Eduard Krimer, Ekaterina Yanovskaya and Helle Pild. Outstanding in ceramics are the works of Victor Olshevsky and in jewellery those of Utha Paas-Alexandrova. A substantial contribution to the country's decorative and applied art was made by the porcelain services and vases of Alexei Vorobievsky and Ivan Riznich, the table services of Alexandra Schekotikhina-Pototskaya and the works of Anna Leporskaya, Mikhail Mokh, Serafima Yakovleva, Vladimir Semionov, and Vladimir Gorodetsky. Fabrics produced by the Slutskaya factory became popular.

== 1960s–80s ==
The main creative forces in Leningrad fine art were concentrated in the city's branch of the Artists' Union (LOSKh). By the late 1980s it united more than 3,000 professional artists in various fields – painters, sculptors, graphic artists and specialists in decorative and applied art. There were separate sections for monumental artists, artistic photographers and artist-restorers. Another large group of artists was brought together by the Combine of Painting and Design Art (KZhOI) and other production subdivisions of the Leningrad branch of the Art Fund of the RSFSR. Amateur artists came together around the fine arts studios that existed in all districts of the city, based primarily in Houses and Palaces of Culture and clubs. The links of this system interacted, not only providing broad involvement in fine arts activities, but also serving as route of entry into the profession for the most creatively gifted young people.

From the early 1960s artists' living and working conditions changed substantially. Official purchases of works increased and the system of contracts was in proved. From 1966 guaranteed payment for artists' work on a par with the average industrial wage was introduced in the LOSKh. This innovation affected around 500 practitioners in all branches of the fine arts. In the 1970s a new exhibition hall of the Artists' Union was opened in the Okhta area of the city as well as the Manege Central Exhibition Hall. In 1961 artists were presented with the celebrated House on Pesochny Embankment, containing 50 apartments and 100 art studios for sculptors, painters and graphic artists. Construction of housing and permanent studios for artists was launched on Vasilyevsky Island and the Okhta, in the town of Pushkin and other parts of the city. The House of Artists' Creativity in Staraya Ladoga was enlarged and reconstructed, becoming a favourite place for Leningrad painters to work. In this period many artists worked at the "Academic Dacha", at the RSFSR Artists' Union's creative centres in Gurzuf in the Crimea, on Lakes Baikal and Seliger and the spa town of Goryachy Klyuch in the Northern Caucasus.

A whole system of art exhibitions was established, in which a central place was taken by the Leningrad "zonal exhibitions". They preceded the republic-level "Soviet Russia" exhibitions. The first "Leningrad" zonal exhibition was held in 1964 and became one of the largest presentations of the city's fine art in the whole of its history.

Subsequently, zonal exhibitions were held regularly and contracts were made for works to be produced for them. It was from the zonal and republican exhibitions that the bulk of purchases were made by museums, the Ministry of Culture and the Art Fund of Russian Federation. Most significant in terms of numbers of participants and the quality of works were "Exhibition of the Works of Leningrad Artists 1961" (Russian Museum), a series of exhibitions under the title "Our Contemporary" in the Russian Museum, including the 1975 Zonal exhibition, "Across Our Native Land" (1972, Russian Museum), "Leningrad Fine Art" (1976, Moscow), "Art Belongs to the People" (1977, Manege Central Exhibition Hall), "The Zonal Exhibition of Works by Leningrad Artists 1980" (Manege Central Exhibition Hall), and the retrospective exhibition "Liberated Person" (1987, Russian Museum). The exhibition "Contemporary Leningrad Art" (1988), (Saint Petersburg Manege|Manege Central Exhibition Hall) brought together for the first time members of the Leningrad branch of the Artists' Union, primarily belonging to the "leftist" wing, amateur artists and representatives of "unofficial art". Each year there were traditional spring and autumn exhibitions, and, from the mid-1970s, veterans' exhibitions. Among the group exhibitions that caused a stir were "The Exhibition of 11 artists" (1972), "The Exhibition of 9 artists" (1976), the three-man exhibition of Sergei Osipov, Arseny Semionov, and Nirill Guschin (1977, LOSKh) and an exhibition of 26 Moscow and Leningrad artists (1990, Manege Central Exhibition Hall). Among the personal exhibitions (all held in the LOSKh unless otherwise shown) that became events in the city's artistic life were those of Piotr Buchkin (1961), Alexander Samokhvalov (1963), Nikolai Timkov (1964, 1975), Vladimir Gorb (1967), Victor Oreshnikov (1974, Academy of Arts), Leonid Kabachek (1975), Engels Kozlov (1976), Alexander Vedernikov (1977), Yuri Neprintsev (1979, Academy of Arts), Vladimir Tokarev (1980), Elena Skuin (1980), Yaroslav Krestovsky (1981), Evsey Moiseenko (1982, Russian Museum), Mikhail Natarevich (1982), Sergei Zakharov (1984), Vitaly Tulenev (1985), Boris Lavrenko (1986, Academy of Arts), Yaroslav Nikolaev (1986), Olga Bogaevskaya (1987), Piotr Belousov (1987, Academy of Arts), Nikolai Galakhov (1988), Vladimir Ovchinnikov (1988), Alexander Semionov (1988), Boris Ugarov (1988, ГРМ), Vecheslav Zagonek (1990, Academy of Arts), Sergei Osipov (1991), Gleb Savinov (1991), Semion Rotnitsky (1991) and a number of others. The fine art of Leningrad was invariably represented broadly at republican, All-Union and foreign exhibitions of Soviet art.

The 1960s and 1970s were a period of true maturity for Leningrad painting. Those years saw many major figures, including Evsey Moiseenko, Vecheslav Zagonek, Boris Korneev, Gleb Savinov, Nikolai Timkov, Sergei Osipov, Leonid Kabachek, Arseny Semionov, Vladimir Ovchinnikov, Alexei Eriomin, Nikolai Pozdneev, Mikhail Kaneev, Maya Kopitseva and Ivan Savenko, at the height of their creative powers.

The works of Victor Teterin, Yaroslav Krestovsky, German Yegoshin, Evgenia Antipova, Vasily Golubev, Vitaly Tulenev, Leonid Tkachenko, Valery Vatenin and Zaven Arshakuny reflected the spirit of search and change in its Leningrad dimension. From strict objectivism founded on the experience of Russian realist painting of the second half of the 19th century, artists turned to a search for individually striking form in painting, affirming the idea of the value of a creative personality's inner world. At the same time the leaders of the "left wing" of the LOSKh remained within the mainstream of the traditional Russian understanding of the purpose of art, which insisted upon a concept having meaningfulness and moral purpose.

Among the best known works from this period are the paintings «Leningrad Woman (In 1941)» (1961) by Boris Ugarov, Morning (1961), «The Storm Has Passed» (1961) and «The Bird-Cherry Is in Blossom» (1964) by Vecheslav Zagonek, «Parting» (1975) and the «Spain triptych» (1979) by Andrei Mylnikov, «The Reds Have Arrived» (1961), «Mothers, Sisters» (1967), «Sweet Cherries» (1969) and «Victory» (1972) by Evsey Moiseenko, «About Tomorrow» (1961), «Trains Are Taking the Lads Away» (1965) and «Thoughts» (1970) by Leonid Kabachek, «Maternal Thoughts» (1969) by Alexei Eriomin, «Black Gold» (1969) by Engels Kozlov, «Victory Day» (1975) and «The First Tractor» (1980) by Gleb Savinov, «Watchmakers» (1968) by Yaroslav Krestovsky, «Portrait of Shostakovich» (1964) and «Sviatoslav Richter» (1972) by Joseph Serebriany, «Childhood Street» (1972) by Vitaly Tulenev, «Happy Woman» (1969) by Andrey Yakovlev, «Portrait of Boris Piotrovsky» (1971) by Victor Oreshnikov, «Self-Portrait» (1974) by Larisa Kirillova, «Russian Winter. Hoarfrost» (1969) by Nikolai Timkov, and «The Leningrad Symphony, Mravinsky Conducting» (1980) by Lev Russov.

The achievements of Leningrad sculpture of the 1960s–80s are associated with the names of Mikhail Anikushin, Vera Isaevs, Levon Lazarev, Boris Kaplansky, Moisey Whyman, Vasily Stamov, Lubov Kholina, Maria Kharlamova, Nikolai Kochukov, Iya Venkova, Vasily Astapov, Valentina Rybalko, Grigory Yastrebenetsky and others. Among the best known works are the monument to Maxim Gorky (1968, sculptor Vera Isaeva, architect Efim Levinson), the monument to Giacomo Quarenghi (1967, sculptor Levon Lazarev, architect Mikhail Meysel), the monument to Lenin on Moscow Square (1970, sculptor Mikhail Anikushin), the memorial to The Heroic Defenders of Leningrad on Victory Square (1975, sculptor Mikhail Anikushin, architects Vasily Kamensky, Sergei Speransky), the monument to Nikolai Nekrasov (1971, sculptor Mikhail Eidlin, architect Vladimir Vasilkovsky).

This period saw development in all the forms of graphic art traditional for Leningrad: book illustration, etching, lithography, linocut, drawing and the poster. In book illustration deserved fame accrued to the works of Yuri Vasnetsov, Eugene Charushin, Alexei Pakhomov, Gennady Epifanov, Boris Kalaushin, Oleg Pochtenny, Kirill Ovchinnikov, Alexander Traugot, Valery Traugot, Vladimir Beskaravainy and Valentin Kurdov. The art of etching was enriched by the creations of Yuri Neprintsev, Valentina Petrova, Leonid Petrov, Alexander Kharshak, Anatoli Smirnov, Vladimir Shistko and Vasily Zvontsov, while Vladimir Vetrogonsky, Victor Valtsefer, Oleg Ivanov and Vadim Smirnov worked successfully in the field of lithography.

In the decorative and applied art of Leningrad, too, in the 1960–1980s, as Natalia Taranovskaya puts it, "features of a single school were forming". In porcelain, ceramics and glass related concepts of the beauty of shapes and ideal proportions took hold. In this period significant works were produced by the porcelain artists Vladimir Gorodetsky, Nina Slavina, Alexei Vorobievsky and Anna Leporskaya, the ceramists Vladimir Vasilkovsky, Natalia Savinova, Alexander Zadorin, Inna Olevskaya and Mikhail Kopilkov, the glass artists Boris Smirnov, Leyda Yurgen, Alexandra Ostroumova, Helle Pild, Ekaterina Yanovskaya and Serafima Bogdanova and the fabric designers Sarah Buntsus, Nika Moiseeva, Inna Rakhimova, Rose Krestovskaya and Tatiana Prozorova. Alongside the acknowledged leaders of Leningrad's artistic industries – the Leningrad Lomonosov Porcelain Factory, the Leningrad Artistic Glassworks, the Slutskaya Textile Mill and the Russkiye Samotsvety jewellery factory – new manufacturing facilities appeared in which members of Leningrad's young generation of specialists in decorative and applied art realized their ambitious ideas.

In 1974–75 the city's Gaza and Nevsky Palaces of Culture were the venues for events that went down in the history of the Leningrad underground as the first permitted exhibitions of non-conformist artists and gave the ironic name "gazonevshchina" to one of the phenomena in the artistic life of the 1970s and 1980s. In 1982 the Fellowship of Experimental Fine Art (TEII), an informal grouping of predominantly "leftist" artists, came into being. The TEII's first exhibition took place that same year. The creators of the TEII declared their aim to be "uniting artists to improve their work in an atmosphere of creativity and mutual support founded on democratic traditions". The TEII existed until 1988.

In the 1980s, informal associations of artists appeared: Yan Antonyshev, Yevgeny Ukhnalyov / Stary gorod (1981), Timur Novikov, Georgy Guryanov, Sergei Bugaev / Novyye Khudozhniki (1982), Dmitry Shagin, Alexander Florensky, Olga Florenskaya, Vladimir Shinkarev, Viktor Tikhomirov / Mitki (1984), Alexey Parygin / Nevsky-25 (1987), Sergey Kovalsky, Evgeny Orlov / Pushkinskaya-10 (1989), and others.

== Criticism and legacy ==
In 1992, after the break-up of the USSR and Leningrad being renamed Saint Petersburg, the Saint Petersburg Artists' Union was formed, which became the legal successor to the Leningrad branch of the Artists' Union of the RSFSR. By that time funds were no longer being allocated for the official purchase of works of fine art. The Art Fund had also ceased to exist and its enterprises were liquidated or lost to the Artists' Union. The House of Creativity in Staraya Ladoga had also been lost. The artistic glassworks was closed down. There was a real threat of the single St Petersburg Artists' Union breaking apart and the historical building of the Society for the Encouragement of the Arts being lost. In this period Leningrad practitioners of the fine arts, using their authority and the support of colleagues and the public, were able to preserve the unity of the St Petersburg Artists' Union and the Academy of Arts as a school. Therein lies not only their great service to St Petersburg art but at the same time a symbolic handover from the Leningrad masters of the fine arts to new generations of St Petersburg artists.

The contemporary development of the fine arts in Saint Petersburg demonstrates that in their wide variety of forms and manifestations they are guided by the finest traditions and achievements of Leningrad's exponents of painting, graphic art, monumental and applied art. Their works are to be found not only in the displays and stocks of major art museums and private collections. We encounter them on the pages of books and in a domestic setting. They adorn the squares, streets and public buildings of towns and cities. As a consequence this art not only continues to live an active life, but also inspires our contemporaries to draw upon and reinterpret its experience. This applies to such themes as the consequences of the formation in 1932 of a single LOSKh, Socialist Realism and the competition of directions and tendencies in the fine arts in Leningrad, the concept of a "Leningrad School" and more. For example, regarding the formation of a single LOSKh, Valeria Ushakova writes: "We cannot deny that one of the main criteria for the assessment of works of art was professionalism. Paradoxical as it might be, it was precisely the struggle for so-called 'ideological purity' that enabled Russian (Soviet) art to preserve its school... It was precisely the political choice in favour of realism that made it possible to preserve the traditions of true Russian realism and the splendid artistic school despite all the negative aspects of ideological pressure."

== See also ==
- Leningrad School of Painting
- Saint Petersburg Union of Artists

== Gallery ==
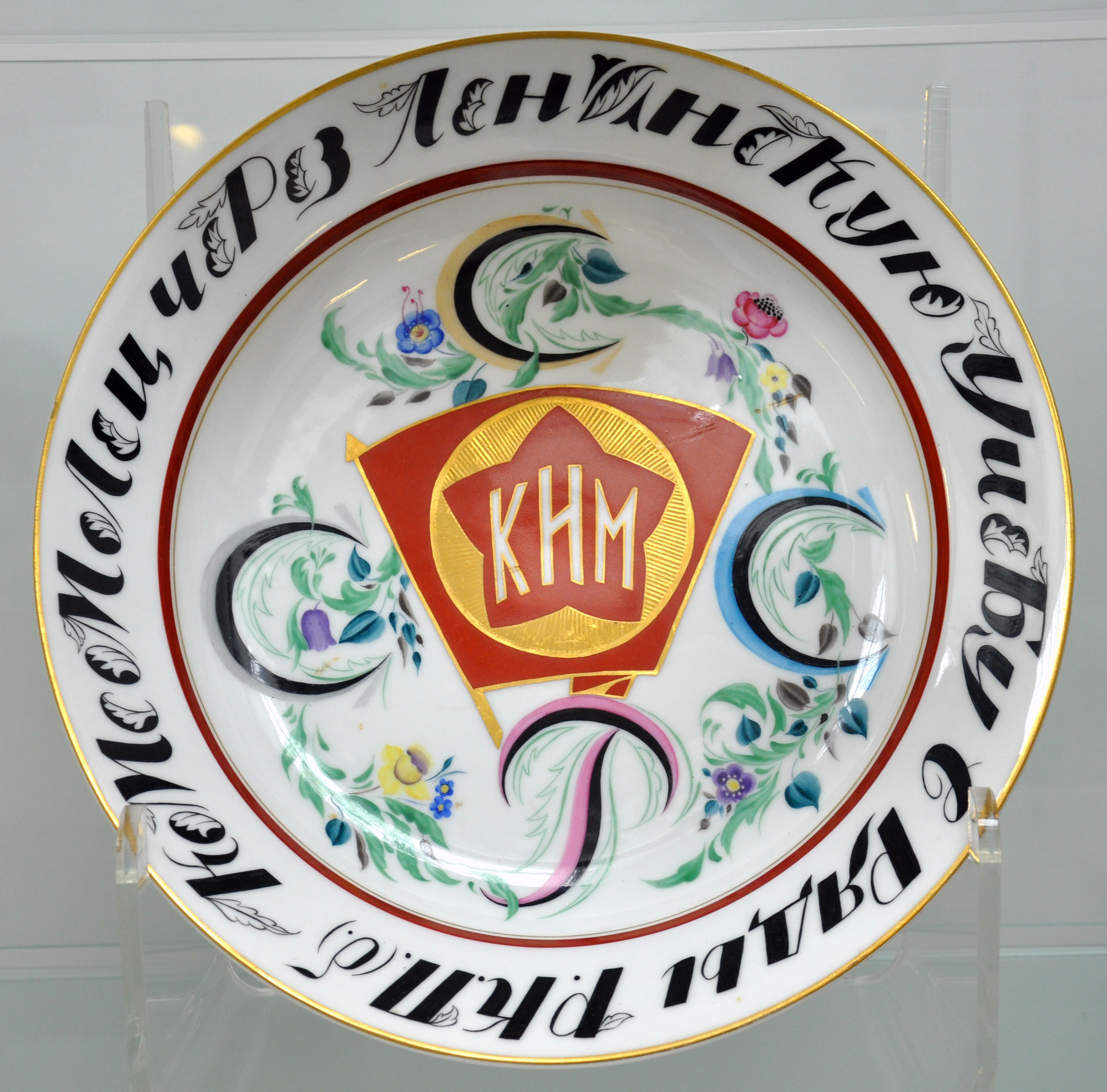
Sergey Chekhonin
Agitation porcelain. Plate. 1925

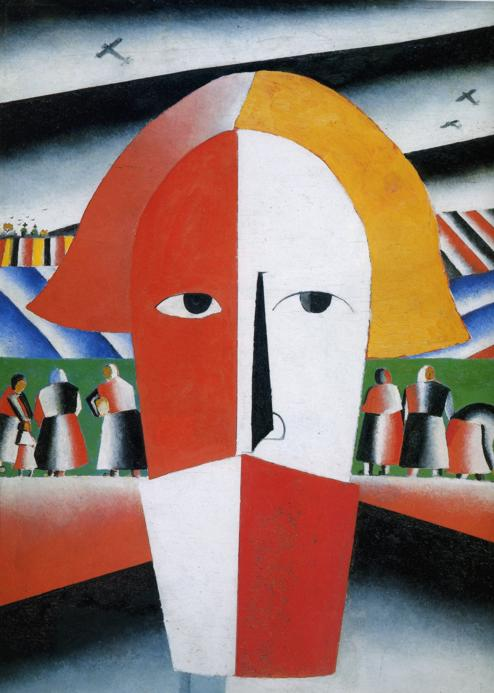
Kazimir Malevich
Head of a Peasant. 1930

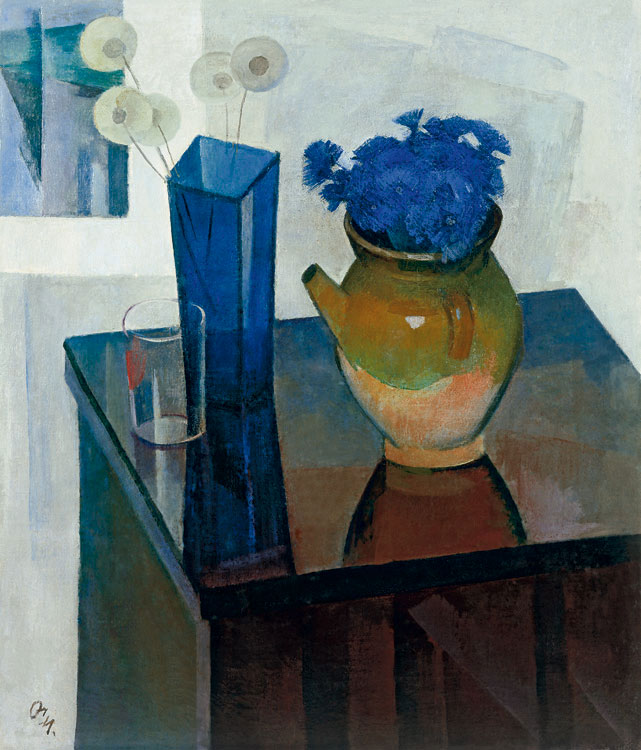
Sergei Osipov
Cornflowers. 1976

== Sources ==
- Голлербах, Э. Государственный фарфоровый завод и художники // Русское искусство, No. 2—3. Петроград, 1923.
- Каталог выставки картин художников Петрограда всех направлений за пятилетний период деятельности. 1918–1923. Петроград: Академия художеств, 1923.
- VIII Выставка картин и скульптуры АХРР "Жизнь и быт народов СССР". Справочник-каталог с иллюстрациями. Л.: АХРР, 1926.
- Юбилейная выставка изобразительных искусств. 1917–Х-1927. Каталог. Л.: 1927.
- Каталог первой выставки ленинградских художников. Л.: ГРМ, 1935.
- Стенографический отчёт выступления искусствоведа Н. Н. Пунина на обсуждении выставки этюда. 11 Февраля 1945 года // Центральный Государственный Архив литературы и искусства. СПб.: Ф. 78. Оп. 1. Д. 58.
- Стенографический отчёт дискуссии по обсуждению доклада Н. Н. Пунина "Импрессионизм и проблемы картины" 3 мая 1946 года // Центральный Государственный Архив литературы и искусства. СПб.: Ф. 78. Оп. 1. Д. 73.
- Стенографический отчёт заседания Правления ЛССХ о задачах Союза в связи с открытием советского отдела в ГРМ и обсуждения плана работы клуба художников. 16 апреля 1947 года // Центральный Государственный Архив литературы и искусства. СПб.: Ф. 78. Оп. 1. Д. 99.
- Художественная выставка 1950 года. Живопись. Скульптура. Графика. Каталог. Издание второе. М.: Советский художник, 1950.
- Всесоюзная художественная выставка, посвящённая 40-летию Великой Октябрьской социалистической революции. Каталог. М.: Советский художник, 1957.
- Двести лет Академии художеств СССР. Каталог выставки. Л.—М.: 1958.
- Бродский, И. А. Памятник героическим защитникам Ленинграда. Пискарёвское мемориальное кладбище-музей. Л.: Художник РСФСР, 1964.
- Ленинград. Зональная выставка. Л: Художник РСФСР, 1965.
- Паперная, Н. Н. Подвиг века. Художники, скульпторы, архитекторы, искусствоведы в годы Великой Отечественной войны и блокады Ленинграда. Л.: Лениздат, 1969.
- Бродский, И. А. Исаак Израилевич Бродский. М.: Изобразительное искусство, 1973.
- Художники города — фронта. Воспоминания и дневники ленинградских художников. Редактор-составитель И. А. Бродский. Л.: Художник РСФСР, 1973.
- Изобразительное искусство Ленинграда. Каталог выставки. Л.: Художник РСФСР, 1976.
- Василевская, Н. И. Ленинградская школа художественного стекла / Изобразительное искусство Ленинграда. Выставка произведений ленинградских художников. Л.: Художник РСФСР, 1981.
- Ганеева, В., Гусев, В., Цветова, А. Изобразительное искусство Ленинграда. Выставка произведений ленинградских художников. Москва. Ноябрь 1976 – январь 1977. Л.: Художник РСФСР, 1981.
- Гусев, В. А., Леняшин, В. А. Ленинградскому изобразительному искусству шестьдесят лет / Изобразительное искусство Ленинграда. Выставка произведений ленинградских художников. Л.: Художник РСФСР, 1981.
- Матафонов, В. С. Развитие ленинградской графики / Изобразительное искусство Ленинграда. Выставка произведений ленинградских художников. Л.: Художник РСФСР, 1981.
- Мочалов, Л. В. Некоторые проблемы развития ленинградского искусства / Изобразительное искусство Ленинграда. Выставка произведений ленинградских художников. Л.: Художник РСФСР, 1981.
- Немиро, О. В. Современное декоративно-оформительское искусство Ленинграда / Изобразительное искусство Ленинграда. Выставка произведений ленинградских художников. Л.: Художник РСФСР, 1981.
- Плотников, В. И. Некоторые аспекты ленинградской критики и художественного процесса / Изобразительное искусство Ленинграда. Выставка произведений ленинградских художников. Л: Художник РСФСР, 1981.
- Тарановская, Н. В. Основные направления в развитии декоративно-прикладного искусства Ленинграда / Изобразительное искусство Ленинграда. Выставка произведений ленинградских художников. Л.: Художник РСФСР, 1981.
- Дюженко, Ю. Медаль номер один "За оборону Ленинграда" // Искусство. 1985, No. 5. С. 24–27.
- Ройтенберг, О. Они погибли на войне // Искусство. 1985, No. 5. С. 19–26.
- Никифоровская, И. В. Художники осажденного города. Ленинградские художники в годы Великой Отечественной войны. Л.: Искусство, 1985
- Герман, М. Ю. Александр Русаков. М., Советский художник, 1989.
- Лисовский, В. Г. Академия художеств. СПб.: Алмаз, 1997.
- Раскин, А. Г. Связь времён / Связь времён. Каталог выставки ЦВЗ "Манеж". СПб.: 1997.
- Vern G. Swanson. Soviet Impressionism. Woodbridge, England: Antique Collectors' Club, 2001.
- Ушакова, В. А. Прошлое и настоящие Ленинградского — Санкт-Петербургского Союз художников // Художники — городу. Выставка к 70-летию Санкт-Петербургского Союза художников. СПб.: Петрополь, 2003.
- Блокадный дневник. Живопись и графика блокадного времени. СПб.: 2005.
- Time for change. The Art of 1960–1985 in the Soviet Union / Almanac. Vol. 140. Saint Petersburg, State Russian Museum, 2006.
- Sergei V. Ivanov. Unknown Socialist Realism. The Leningrad School. Saint Petersburg, NP-Print Edition, 2007.
- Юбилейный Справочник выпускников Санкт-Петербургского академического института живописи, скульптуры и архитектуры имени И. Е. Репина Российской Академии художеств. 1915–2005. СПб.: Первоцвет, 2007.
- Живопись первой половины ХХ века (К) / Альманах. Вып. 226. СПб.: Palace Editions, 2008.
- Манин, В. С. Искусство и власть. Борьба течений в советском изобразительном искусстве 1917—1941 годов. СПб: Аврора, 2008.
- Конова, Л. С. Санкт-Петербургский Союз художников. Краткая хроника 1932–2009 // Петербургские искусствоведческие тетради. Выпуск 16. СПб., 2009.
- Дом художников на Большой Морской. Автор—составитель Ю. М. Иваненко. СПб, 2011.
- Живопись первой половины ХХ века (Л, М) / Альманах. Вып. 331. СПб.: Palace Editions, 2011
- Живопись первой половины ХХ века (Н—Р) / Альманах. Вып. 404. СПб.: Palace Editions, 2013.
