= Soviet Russia (exhibition, 1965) =

1965 Soviet art exhibition

Second National Art Exhibition "Soviet Russia". Catalog
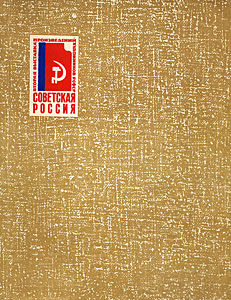
- Year: 1965
- Location: Manezh Exhibition Hall; Moscow

The Second National Art Exhibition "Soviet Russia" (Moscow, 1965) (Russian: Вторая Республиканская художественная выставка "Советская Россия" 1965 года) was one of the largest Soviet art exhibitions of the 1960s. The exhibition took place in Manezh Exhibition Hall.

== History and organization ==
Organization and preparation of the Second National Art Exhibition "Soviet Russia" engaged specially formed Exhibition Committee in the amount of 69 most authoritative experts in the field of fine arts under head of Vladimir Serov. It was published Catalog of the exhibition. In total, the Exhibition displayed more than 2,000 works of art of painters, sculptors, graphics, masters of arts and crafts, artists of theater and cinema. Many of art works have been purchased for the largest Soviet Art museums, including the Russian Museum, the Tretyakov Gallery, and others. After the Exhibition in Moscow there were organized traveling exhibitions, which have been shown in major cities of the Russian Federation.

== Contributing artists ==
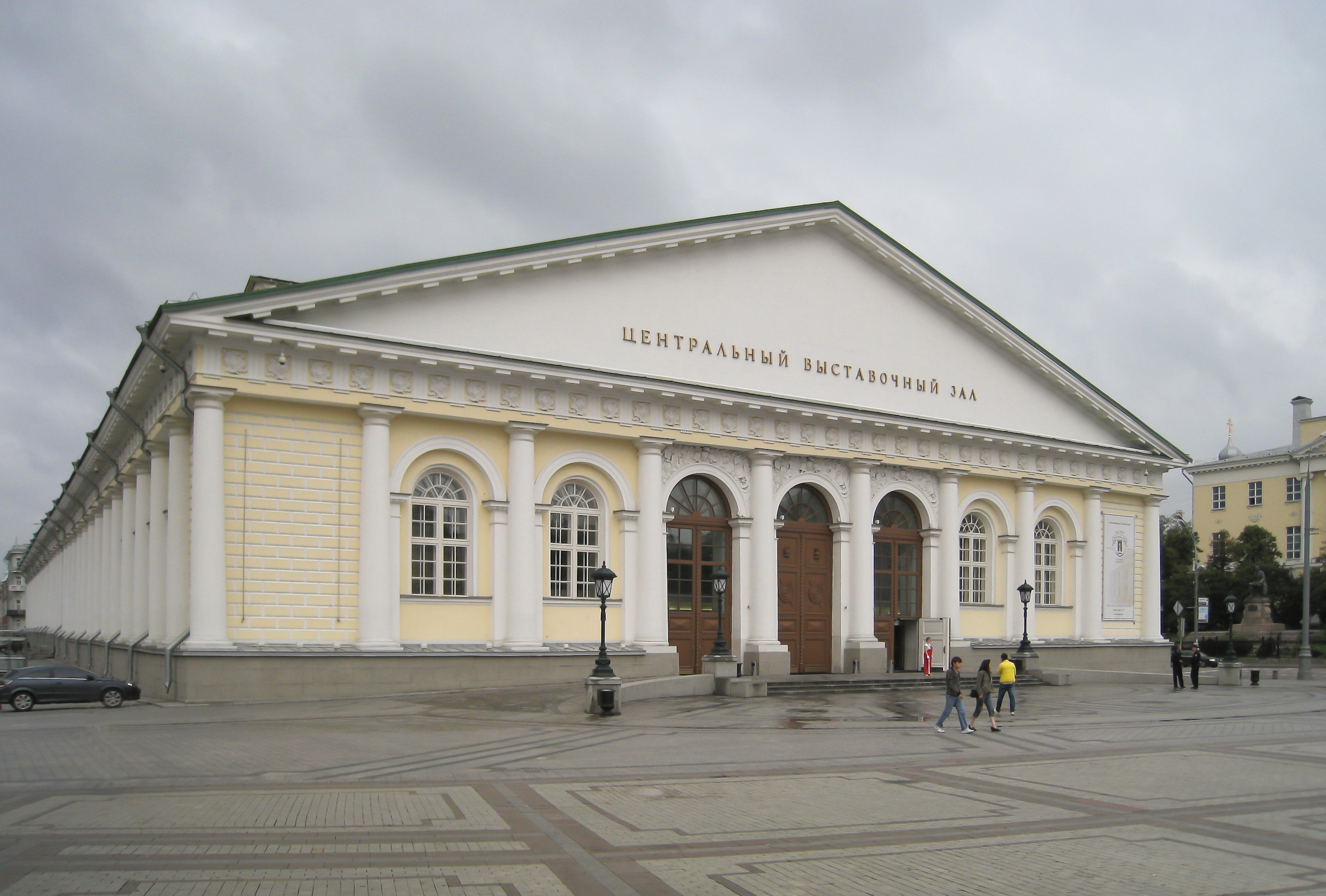
Moscow Manezh Exhibition Hall. 2008

In the largest Department of Painting were exhibited art works by over 300 authors. There were Yuri Belov, Piotr Belousov, Dmitry Belyaev, Olga Bogaevskaya, Nikolai Galakhov, Sergey Gerasimov, Aleksei Gritsai, Aleksandr Deyneka, Alexei Eriomin, Boris Ioganson, Mikhail Kaneev, Gely Korzhev, Pavel Korin, Engels Kozlov, Marina Kozlovskaya, Aleksandr Laktionov, Anatoli Levitin, Oleg Lomakin, Dmitry Maevsky, Boris Maluev, Evsey Moiseenko, Dmitry Oboznenko, Victor Oreshnikov, Yuri Neprintsev, Yaroslav Nikolaev, Varlen Pen, Semion Rotnitsky, Ivan Savenko, Gleb Savinov, Joseph Serebriany, Alexander Sokolov, Nikolai Timkov, Vitaly Tulenev, Yuri Tulin, Boris Ugarov, Ivan Varichev, Vasily Yefanov, Vecheslav Zagonek, and many others most prominent painters of the Russian Federation.

In the Department of Sculptures were exhibited art works by over 150 authors including Mikhail Anikushin, Lev Kerbel, Alexander Kibalnikov, Nikolai Tomsky, Vasily Vatagin, and many others most prominent sculptors of the Russian Federation.

In the Department of Graphic were exhibited art works by Piotr Belousov, Dmitry Oboznenko, Yuri Neprintsev, Alexei Pakhomov, Sergei Zakharov, and many others most prominent graphic artists of the Russian Federation.

== Contributed artworks ==
For display at the Exhibition were selected art works created in 1964-1965, as well as some earlier works. Many of them were previously shown at the city and regional Art Exhibitions and were subsequently found in the collections of Soviet Art museums, as well as domestic and foreign galleries and collectors.

Historical genre was presented by "Lenin with workers of Putilov Factory on October 28, 1917" by Yuri Belov, "Petersburg. 9 of May, 1864. Nikolai Chernyshevsky" by Lev Chegorovsky, "The Siege of Leningrad" by Boris Fedorov, "Adust by War Fire" (triptych), "Street Singer", "Mother", "Backtraces of War" by Gely Korzhev, "The Road of Life", "The Year of 1941", "Ice Highway. Ladoga 23 of April 1942" by Boris Korneev, "The Leningrad in the fight" by Oleg Lomakin, "Donbass" by Boris Maluev, "Bread. The Year of 1941", "The Tram has Coming to Front" by Yuri Neprintsev, "Roads of War" by Boris Nikolaev, "Before the Flight", "On the Roads", "On the Circle Line" by Grigory Nissky, "Bloody Sunday. January 9, 1905" by Dmitry Oboznenko, "Leningraders" by Ivan Penteshin, "Gorki. 23 of January 1924" by Vladimir Serov, "Road of Life" by Alexander Sokolov, "October" by Boris Ugarov, and others.

Portrait was presented by "Zoya" by Dmitry Belyaev, "Son" by Olga Bogaevskaya, "Family" by Dmitry Zhilinsky, "Discoverer of Yakutia Diamonds L. A. Popugaeva" by Boris Korneev, "Portrait of Nikolai Kalistratov, miner" by Engels Kozlov, "Portrait of Old Bolshevik P. I. Voevodin" by Aleksandr Laktionov, "Portrait of Yuri Vasiljev" by Anatoli Levitin, "Portrait of builder Alexandra Fedotova" by Oleg Lomakin, "Zoya - a Komsomol Member of Dzerzhinsky Sovkhoz" by Dmitry Maevsky, "Portrait of Lace-maker" Konstantin Maksimov, "Natasha", "Sergei Esenin with Grandfather" by Evsey Moiseenko, "Verochka" by Andrei Mylnikov, "Portrait of Academician Kupriyanov" by Yaroslav Nikolaev, "Portrait of Doctor of Physics and Mathematics Professor A. E. Sazonov" by Victor Oreshnikov, "Portrait of People's Artist Alexei Pakhomov" by Pen Varlen, "Group portrait of Izhorsky Factory's workers" by Ivan Penteshin, "Mother" by Arkady Plastov, "Portrait of Leonid Ovsannikov, Honored art worker of Russian Federation" by Semion Rotnitsky, "Seamen", "Mothers" by Gleb Savinov, "Portrait of composer Dmitri Shostakovich" by Joseph Serebriany, "Wives and mothers of soldiers" by Vladimir Tokarev, "Portrait of v. I. Korotkova, Milling Machine Operator" by Mikhail Trufanov, "Portrait of Academician Ivan Artobolevsky", "Portrait of Academician Nikolai Ermolenko", "Portrait of Norair Sisakian", "Portrait of Antokolskaya" by Vasily Yefanov, and others.

Genre painting was presented by "Komsomol building", "On Baykal Lake" by Dmitry Belyaev, "Forest weekdays" by Nikolai Galakhov, "Trains Take away the Boys", "Spring again", "Melodies from the Past" by Leonid Kabachek, "Native Place" by Engels Kozlov, "In the Evening", "In Saturday" by Jury Kugatch, "Night Shift", "In the Way" by Anatoli Levitin, "Tractor Drivers" by Oleg Lomakin, "Friends", "Ground", "From the Childhood" by Evsey Moiseenko, "Sun over Again" by Yuri Neprintsev, "Song of Old Evenk", "Path along the River" by Vsevolod Petrov-Maslakov, "Showery Rain", "New Numbers", "New Road", "Morning" by Yuri Pimenov, "On Pier" by Alexander Sokolov, "First Row of Beams", "Spring Garden", "November" by Valentin Sidorov, by "No War", "Fallen Demonstrator" by Yuri Tulin, "To the School", "Sunrise. Night watch" by Vitaly Tulenev, "At the crossing" by Ivan Varichev, "Family" by Dmitry Zhilinsky, and others.

Landscape and Cityscape were presented by "Onega Seashore", "Blue Water", "Mosha River", "Horticulturists" by Piotr Fomin, "Forest Weekdays" by Nikolay Galakhov, "Summer", "First Snow", "Riverside", "Young Aspens", "Spring Day" by Sergey Gerasimov, "On the Onega River" by Alexei Eriomin, "Stroiteley Bridge", "Narvskaya zastava" by Mikhail Kaneev, "Volkhov River. Oleg`s Mound" by Marina Kozlovskaya, "Our Leningrad" by Boris Maluev, "Apple Trees in Winter" by Evsey Moiseenko, "Fire", "Unexpected Snow", "Tverskoy boulevard", "Frunzenskaya Embankment" by Nikolay Romadin, "Light-Blue March", "The vast expanses the North", "Spring Flood" by Ivan Savenko, "Kargopol town", "Shotov's Mountain" by Vladimir Stozharov, "Petrogradskaya Side", "Behind Narvskaya Gates", "On Teza River" by Nikolai Timkov, "Suburb" by Boris Ugarov, "A March", "Evening" by Ivan Varichev, "Chukotka Spring" by Andrew Yakovlev, "The Beginning of May", "Sunny Day", "Blooming of Bird-cherry Tree", "Wet Ground", "March. Weekdays" by Vecheslav Zagonek, and others.

Still-life paintings were presented by "Still-life. Peppers" by Mariam Aslamazian, "Toys", "Spoons" by Irina Bogdanova, "Bread, salt and a cup of wine", "Moscow Muffin" by Vladimir Stozharov, "Spring Flowers" by Vladimir Tokarev, "Our Maize" by Dmitry Zhuravljev, "August" by Dmitry Shirjaev, and others.

== Acknowledgment ==
Second National Art Exhibition "Soviet Russia" were widely covered in the press and literature on Soviet fine art.

== See also ==
- Fine Art of Leningrad
- Leningrad School of Painting
- Soviet art
- 1965 in fine arts of the Soviet Union
- Saint Petersburg Union of Artists
- Socialist realism

== Sources ==
- Вторая Республиканская художественная выставка "Советская Россия". Живопись. Скульптура. Графика. Монументально-декоративное и театрально-декорационное искусство. Каталог. М,., Советский художник, 1965.
- Справочник членов Ленинградской организации Союза художников РСФСР. Л., Художник РСФСР, 1980.
- Художники народов СССР. Биографический словарь. Т.1-4. М., Искусство, 1970-1995.
- Справочник членов Союза художников СССР. Том 1,2. М., Советский художник, 1979.
- Леняшин В. А. Художников друг и советник. Современная живопись и проблемы критики. Л., Художник РСФСР, 1985. С.60.
- Time for Change. The Art of 1960-1985 in the Soviet Union. Saint Petersburg, State Russian Museum, 2006. P.375.
- Sergei V. Ivanov. Unknown Socialist Realism. The Leningrad School. Saint Petersburg: NP-Print Edition, 2007. P.398. ISBN 5-901724-21-6, ISBN 978-5-901724-21-7
- Юбилейный Справочник выпускников Санкт-Петербургского академического института живописи, скульптуры и архитектуры имени И. Е. Репина Российской Академии художеств. 1915—2005. СПб., «Первоцвет», 2007.
