= Alexei Pakhomov =

Russian painter (1900–1973)

- Born: 2 October 1900; Varlamovo, Kadnikovsky Uyezd, Vologda Governorate, Russian Empire
- Died: 14 April 1973 (aged 72); Leningrad, Russian SFSR, Soviet Union
- Education: School of Technical Drawing of Baron Alexander von Stieglitz; State Higher Institute of Art and Technology
- Known for: Painting
- Notable work: Leningrad in the Days of the Blockade
- Movement: Russian avant-garde
- Awards: State Stalin Prize; People's Artist of the USSR; USSR State Prize (1973)

Alexei Fedorovich Pakhomov (Russian: Алексей Фёдорович Пахомов; 2 October 1900 [O.S. 19 September 1900] – 14 April 1973) was a Russian painter. He was known as a master of lithography. Early in his career, he was an illustrator for children's books. His work during World War II earned him the State Stalin Prize. He later became a professor of art and was named a People's Artist of the USSR.

== Life ==
=== Early life ===
Pakhomov was born into a peasant family in a small village. Pakhomov's father was the head of the village, providing him the opportunity to access paper. Pakhomov began to draw as a hobby. People came to see his drawings, and soon a local landlord named Zubov invited him to visit. During those visits, Zubov offered him drawing papers and crayons. Zubov also showed him the works of Surikov and Repin. When Pakhomov finished primary education at the village school, Zubov arranged for Alexei to go to high school in Kadnikov.

=== Training ===
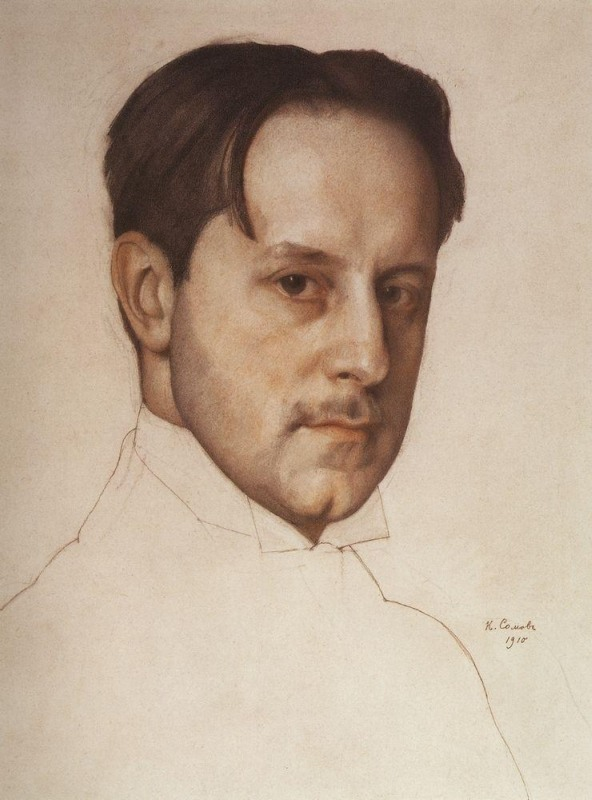
Mstislav Dobuzhinsky, one of Pakhomov's teachers.

In 1915, Zubov's father, former actor Y. Zubov, collected money for Pakhomov to study in Petrograd at the Stieglitz Art School, where his teachers were N. Shukhaev, Sergey Chekhonin, Mstislav Dobuzhinsky, and Alexander Savinov. He remained there until 1917. From 1921, the young artist studied at the Vkhutemas under V. Lebedev, N. Tyrsa, and A. Karev.

Due to the October Revolution and the Russian Civil War, Pakhomov's studies were drawn out until 1925, when he graduated from Vkhutemas. From 1921 to 1923, he joined the Circle of Artists movement.

=== Death ===
Pakhomov died 14 April 1973, aged 72.

== Career ==
=== Children's book illustrations ===
Pakhomov illustrated several children's books, often including idyllic scenes of peasant children. During the 1920s, he traveled to several Young Pioneer summer camps to observe children's activities and expressions in natural surroundings.

Pakhomov co-founded the Artists' Society in 1926 and participated in their exhibitions until 1931. In 1927, his work was included in a Soviet art exhibition in Osaka, Japan. Later, he worked with the magazines Chizh and Ezh, and illustrated children's books by E. L. Schwartz, S. Marshak, and G. Krutov.

=== Response to criticism ===
In the first half of the 1930s, Pakhomov found himself in a difficult situation given the Soviet Union's narrowing official view of art and campaign against "formalism". His paintings, in which half-naked young men and women tan in the sun, were the object of severe criticism. The artist had to choose whether to give up his professional principles or some parts of his art. He chose the latter, concentrating on graphic work and limiting himself even more by almost completely giving up color in his illustrations.

=== World War II ===
When Nazi Germany invaded the Soviet Union during Operation Barbarossa, there was a need for propaganda placards and posters calling citizens to aid the war effort. Pakhomov hurried to Leningrad to do what he could to help. In July 1941, he helped dig anti-tank moats at Moloskovitza station. During the next three years, Pakhomov remained in besieged Leningrad. Between 1942 and 1944, he produced a series of lithographs, Leningrad in the Days of the Blockade, in which he strove to bring forward the very real emotion of the siege of Leningrad: the uniqueness of this particular setting of place and time and the consequent human suffering and strength of spirit. The series earned him the State Stalin Prize in 1946. During the siege, his workshop was hit by a bomb that came through the roof, smashed through the floor, and blew up two floors below, destroying some of his works.

The Russian Institute of Blood Transfusions asked him to cooperate, where he met Vladimir Konashevich, V. Dvorakovsky, and Dmitry Mitrokhin. He received a poster-making order from V. Serov, who was chairman of the Leningrad Union of Artists at the time.

=== Postwar work ===
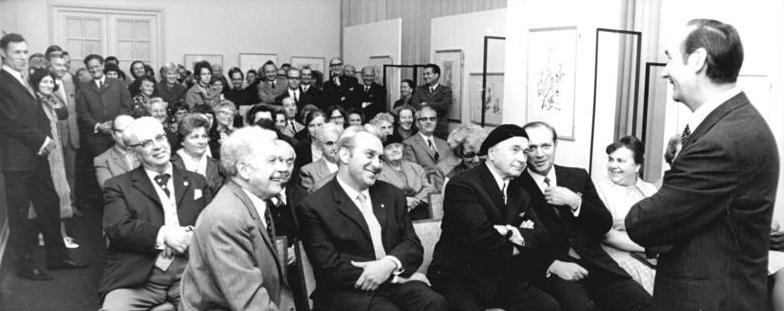
Pakhomov (first row, third from left) at an exhibition of his art in Berlin, 1971.

Between 1944 and 1947, Pakhomov worked on the series In Our City, in which the artist strove to reflect the grand scale of the postwar effort to rebuild ruined Leningrad and to reinstate its formerly vibrant life. The presence of female workers in every traditionally male trade is a reminder of the recent war, which killed millions of Russians. In 1948, he began teaching at the Il’ya Repin Institute of Painting, Sculpture, and Architecture. He became a professor the following year.

In the final period of his work, in the 1950s and 1960s, Pakhomov tried to revive his work after it became a bit too dry, perhaps too influenced by the strongly dogmatic requirements of post-war Russia. In the 1960s he even returned to the use of color but his work during this period did not gain much critical acclaim.

== See also ==
- Fine Art of Leningrad
