= Mikhail Bobyshov =

Russian painter

- Born: Mikhail Pavlovich Bobyshov; 19 November 1885; Pogoreloye, Tver Governorate, Russian Empire
- Died: 7 July 1964 (aged 78); Leningrad, Soviet Union
- Education: Central School of Technical Drawing
- Known for: Painting
- Movement: Realism
- Awards: People's Artist of the RSFSR

Mikhail Pavlovich Bobyshov (Russian: Михаи́л Па́влович Бобышов; 19 November 1885 – 7 July 1964) was a Russian and Soviet painter and stage decorator, professor of the Repin Institute of Arts. People's Artist of the RSFSR (1961).

== Biography ==
Bobyshov was born in Pogoreloye, in the Tver Governorate of the Russian Empire. In 1907, he graduated from the Central School of Technical Drawing of Daron Stieglitz, pupil of Vasily Savinsky, Matvey Chizhov. After graduation, received the title of artist and grant for overseas travel. Visited France, England, Italy, Spain. Take place in Art Exhibitions since 1912. From 1926 to 1964, he taught in the Repin Institute of Arts. As a theater artist, he began working in St. Petersburg since 1911. At the same time, he drew for magazines. He designed theatrical performances for the Maliy Opera Theatre, Leningrad Comedy Theatre, the State Academic Theater Opera and Ballet, the Moscow Opera Theater of Stanislavsky and the Maliy Theater, as well as theaters in Kyiv, Sofia. He was the author of many paintings and drawings. His works reside in the State Russian Museum, Tretyakov Gallery, in many museums and private collections in Russia, France, Ukraine, Germany, and other countries. He died in Leningrad.

== Pupils ==
- Irina Baldina
- Yaroslav Krestovsky
- Igor Veselkin
- Nikolai Brandt
- Joseph Serebriany

== See also ==
- Fine art of Leningrad

== Sources ==
- Голлербах Э., Янковский М. Михаил Павлович Бобышов. Живопись и театр. - Л., 1928.
- Богданов А. Полвека — искусству // Вечерний Ленинград. 1957, 21 ноября.
- Бетхер-Остренко И. Художественная летопись истории. // Вечерний Ленинград, 1964, 28 января.
- Бобышов Михаил Павлович. Выставка произведений. Каталог. Л., Художник РСФСР, 1964.
- Кручина В. Неувядающая молодость творчества // Вечерний Ленинград, 1964, 16 апреля.
- Художники народов СССР. Биобиблиографический словарь. Т.1. М., Искусство, 1970. С.418-419.
- Государственный Русский музей. Живопись. Первая половина ХХ века. Каталог. А—В. Т.8. СПб., Palace Edition, 1997. С.71-72.
- Sergei V. Ivanov. Unknown Socialist Realism. The Leningrad School. Saint Petersburg: NP-Print Edition, 2007. P.14, 19, 357, 358, 362, 369, 373, 378–382, 385, 386, 389, 393, 394, 403, 441, 442. ISBN 5-901724-21-6, ISBN 978-5-901724-21-7.
