= Mikhail Avilov =

Russian painter

Mikhail Ivanovich Avilov
- Born: 6 September 1882; Saint Petersburg, Russian Empire
- Died: 14 April 1954 (aged 71); Leningrad, USSR
- Resting place: Tikhvin Cemetery, St. Petersburg
- Education: Higher Art School (1913)
- Known for: military painting
- Movement: Realism
- Awards: Stalin Prize; Order of the Red Banner of Labour

Mikhail Ivanovich Avilov (Russian: Михаи́л Ива́нович Ави́лов) (6 September 1882, Saint Petersburg – 14 April 1954, Leningrad) was a Russian and Soviet painter and art educator, who lived and worked in Leningrad, a member of the Leningrad Union of Soviet Artists, professor of the Repin Institute of Arts, Stalin Prize winner, People's Artist of the Russian Federation, regarded as one of the brightest representatives of Soviet Art, who played an important role in the formation of the Leningrad School of Painting. He is mostly known for his battle paintings.

== Biography ==
Mikhail Ivanovich Avilov was born on 6 September 1882 in Saint Petersburg. From 1893 to 1903, he studied in the Drawing School of the Imperial Society for the Encouragement of the Arts, then in the private studio of the artist, Leon Dmitriev-Kavkazsky. From 1904 to 1910, Avilov studied at the Imperial Academy of Arts as a pupil of Franz Roubaud and Mykola Samokysh. From 1908, he began to participate in art exhibitions.

Mikhail Avilov fought in the First World War. After the October Revolution of 1917, Avilov taught at the School of Drawing Society for the Encouragement of Arts in Petrograd, then in the College of Industrial Art and the Academy of Arts. From 1923, Avilov was an exhibitor at the AKhRR. In 1932, he was one of the founders of the Leningrad Union of Soviet Artists.

In 1943, Avilov was awarded the Stalin Prize in the first degree for his battle painting «Duel Peresvet with Chelubey at the Kulikovo Field». He was also awarded the Order of the Red Banner of Labour. In 1953, Avilov was awarded the honorary title of a People's Artist of the Russian Federation. He was a Member of the Academy of Arts of the USSR.

Mikhail Ivanovich Avilov died on 14 April 1954 in the seventy-second year of his life. His grave remains at the Tikhvin Cemetery in St. Petersburg, with memorial bust of 1955 by Nikolai Dydykin. His paintings are found in the Russian Museum, the Tretyakov Gallery, and in art museums and private collections in Russia, Ukraine, Japan, China, France, England and other countries.

== Pupils ==
- Vsevolod Bazhenov
- Mikhail Kaneev
- Tatiana Kopnina
- Boris Lavrenko
- Alexander Pushnin
- Galina Smirnova
- Mikhail Tkachev
- and others.

== See also ==
- Fine Art of Leningrad
- Leningrad School of Painting
- List of 20th-century Russian painters
- List of painters of Saint Petersburg Union of Artists
- Saint Petersburg Union of Artists

== Sources ==
- Бродский В. Михаил Иванович Авилов. М., Советский художник, 1956.
- Двести лет Академии художеств СССР. Каталог выставки. Л-М., Искусство, 1958. С.213.
- Государственный Русский музей. Живопись. Первая половина ХХ века. Каталог. А—В. Т.8. СПб., Palace Edition, 1997. С.17-18.
- Художники народов СССР. Биобиблиографический словарь. Т. 1. М., Искусство, 1970. С.42-43.
- Sergei V. Ivanov. Unknown Socialist Realism. The Leningrad School. Saint Petersburg, NP-Print Edition, 2007. P.12, 13, 19, 356, 361-363, 367, 370, 371, 378-385, 388, 390, 392, 395, 447. ISBN 5-901724-21-6, ISBN 978-5-901724-21-7.
