= Nina Veselova =

Russian artist (1922–1960)

Nina Leonidovna Veselova
- Born: January 6, 1922; Petrograd, Soviet Russia
- Died: March 3, 1960 (aged 38); Leningrad, USSR
- Education: Repin Institute of Arts
- Known for: Painting, Graphics
- Movement: Realism

Nina Leonidovna Veselova (Russian: Ни́на Леони́довна Весело́ва; January 6, 1922 – March 3, 1960) was a Russian Soviet realist painter and graphic artist, Doctor of art-criticism (1954), who lived and worked in Leningrad. She was a member of the Leningrad Union of Artists and regarded as one of the brightest representatives of the Leningrad school of painting.

== Biography ==
Veselova was born January 6, 1922, in Petrograd (former Saint Petersburg), Soviet Russia.

From 1934 to 1941 Veselova studied at the Secondary Art School at the All-Russian Academy of Fine Arts, where she was student of Vladimir Gorb, Piotr Kazakov, Leonid Sholokhov, and Alexander Zaitsev.

In 1941, after graduating, Veselova entered at the Department of Painting of the Leningrad Institute of Painting, Sculpture and Architecture. After the beginning of the German-Soviet War, Veselova continued studying in the institute until its evacuation to Central Asia in February 1942.

During World War II and the siege of Leningrad, Veselova remained in Leningrad. She worked at the plant, an educator of kindergarten, in the lumber camps on the outskirts of Leningrad. In 1943–1944, after breaking through the siege of Leningrad, she was engaged in reviving the Tavricheskaya Art School.

In 1944, after the liberation of Leningrad from the enemy's blockade and the return the Leningrad Institute of Painting, Sculpture and Architecture from evacuation, Veselova resumed classes at the faculty of painting. She studied of Mikhail Bernshtein, Genrikh Pavlovsky, Alexander Zaytsev.

In 1950 Veselova graduated from the Leningrad Institute of Painting, Sculpture and Architecture in Boris Ioganson studio, together with Evgenia Antipova, Anatoli Vasiliev, Vecheslav Zagonek, Tatiana Kopnina, Nikolai Mukho, Alexander Pushnin, Alexander Sokolov, Yuri Tulin, and other young artists. Her graduation work was genre painting named "The award-winning teacher", dedicated to the postwar Soviet school.

After graduating in the 1950–1954 years, Veselova continued her postgraduate studies under creative workshop by the leading of People's Artist of the USSR Professor Alexander Gerasimov. In 1954 she was awarded the academic degree of Doctor of art-criticism.

After 1939, Veselova participated in art exhibitions. She painted portraits, genre paintings, landscapes and still lifes. A talented portrait painter and graphic artist, Veselova gravitated to the genre of portrait with a developed plot. Her style is distinguished soft plastic, restrained decorative color, and exquisite tonal relationships.

Veselova was a member of the Leningrad Union of Artists since 1950.

Veselova died in Leningrad on March 3, 1960. Paintings by Veselova reside in State Russian Museum, State Tretyakov Gallery, in the lot of art museums and private collections in Russia, in the U.S., China, England, Japan, and others.

== See also ==
- Leningrad School of Painting
- List of Russian artists
- List of 20th-century Russian painters
- List of painters of Saint Petersburg Union of Artists
- Saint Petersburg Union of Artists

== Sources ==
- Artists of the peoples of the USSR. Biography Dictionary. Volume 2. - Moscow: Iskusstvo Edition, 1972. - pp. 250–251.
- Matthew C. Bown. Dictionary of 20th Century Russian and Soviet Painters 1900-1980s. - London: Izomar, 1998. ISBN 0-9532061-0-6, ISBN 978-0-9532061-0-0.
- Vern G. Swanson. Soviet Impressionism. - Woodbridge, England: Antique Collectors' Club, 2001. - pp. 131, 134-135. ISBN 1-85149-280-1, ISBN 978-1-85149-280-0.
- Irina Romanycheva. Academic Dacha. History and traditions. - Saint Petersburg: Petropol Publishing House, 2009. - pp. 15, 19.
- Sergei V. Ivanov. Unknown Socialist Realism. The Leningrad School. - Saint Petersburg: NP-Print Edition, 2007. – pp. 48, 359, 384, 388-390, 392, 393, 399, 403, 405-407, 411, 413-416, 419, 421-424. ISBN 5-901724-21-6, ISBN 978-5-901724-21-7.
