= Yaroslav Nikolaev =

Russian painter (1899–1978)

- Ярослав Николаев
- Born: 30 April 1899; Šiauliai, Russian Empire
- Died: 1 July 1978 (aged 79); Leningrad, USSR
- Known for: Painting
- Movement: Realism
- Awards: Medal "For the Defence of Leningrad"; People's Artist of the Russian Federation

Yaroslav Sergeevich Nikolaev (Russian: Ярослав Сергеевич Николаев; 30 April 1899 – 1 July 1978) was a Soviet Russian painter, Honored Art worker of Russian Federation (1956), People's Artist of the Russian Federation (1975), a member of the Leningrad Union of Artists, who lived and worked in Leningrad. From 1948 to 1951, Nikolaev was a head of the Leningrad Union of Soviet Artists, regarded as one of representatives of the Leningrad school of painting, most famous for his genre and historical painting.

== See also ==
- Fine Art of Leningrad
- Leningrad School of Painting
- List of 20th-century Russian painters
- List of painters of Saint Petersburg Union of Artists
- Saint Petersburg Union of Artists

== Sources ==
- Бойков В. Изобразительное искусство Ленинграда. Заметки о выставке ленинградских художников // Ленинградская правда, 1947, 29 ноября.
- Земская М. За правду жизни и большую мысль. К итогам осенней выставки ленинградских художников // Смена, 1954, 18 декабря.
- Днепрова Е. Открылась выставка работ ленинградских художников // Вечерний Ленинград, 1956, 6 декабря.
- 1917 — 1957. Выставка произведений ленинградских художников. Каталог. Л., Ленинградский художник, 1958. С.23.
- И. Никифоровская. Итоги большой творческой работы // Вечерний Ленинград. 1957, 10 октября.
- Всесоюзная художественная выставка, посвящённая 40-летию Великой Октябрьской социалистической революции. Каталог. — М: Советский художник, 1957. С.53.
- Недошивин Г. Окрыляющие перспективы. На Всесоюзной художественной выставке // Правда, 1957, 18 декабря.
- К новым большим свершениям // Ленинградская правда. 1958, 12 января.
- Шведова В. Над чем работают ленинградские художники // Художник. 1959, № 9.
- Выставка произведений ленинградских художников 1960 года. Каталог. Л., Художник РСФСР, 1961. С.29.
- На разных континентах // Ленинградская правда, 1961, 26 января.
- Леонтьева Г. В пути // Художник. 1961, № 7. С.9-17.
- Григорьева Н. Всесоюзная художественная // Ленинградская правда, 1963, 26 декабря.
- Бетхер-Остренко И. Художественная летопись истории // Вечерний Ленинград, 1964, 28 января.
- Ленинград. Зональная выставка. — Л: Художник РСФСР, 1965. — с.36.
- Кривенко И. «Ленинград» (раздел живописи) // Художник. 1965, № 3. С.27-36.
- Вторая республиканская художественная выставка «Советская Россия». Каталог. — М: Советский художник, 1965. — с.28.
- Иванов П. Лицо современника // Искусство. 1965, № 8. С.5-10.
- Никифоровская И. Отчитываться мастерством // Ленинградская правда, 1965, 26 ноября.
- Советская Россия. Третья Республиканская художественная выставка. Каталог. — М: Министерство культуры РСФСР, 1967. — с.41.
- Справочник членов Ленинградской организации Союза художников РСФСР. — Л: Художник РСФСР, 1972. — с.37.
- Наш современник. Каталог выставки произведений ленинградских художников 1971 года. — Л: Художник РСФСР, 1972. — с.16.
- Осенняя традиционная // Ленинградская правда, 1971, 11 декабря.
- Яковлева Л. Величие подвига. // Вечерний Ленинград, 1975, 27 мая.
- Наш современник. Зональная выставка произведений ленинградских художников 1975 года. Каталог. — Л: Художник РСФСР, 1980. — с.21.
- И. Мямлин. Сердце с правдой вдвоём… // Ленинградская правда, 1975, 1 июня.
- Изобразительное искусство Ленинграда. Каталог выставки. — Л: Художник РСФСР, 1976. — с.24, 32.
- Осенняя выставка произведений ленинградских художников. 1978 года. Каталог. — Л: Художник РСФСР, 1983. — с.13.
- Справочник членов Союза художников СССР. Т.2. М., Советский художник, 1979. C.128.
- Ярослав Сергеевич Николаев. Сборник материалов и каталог выставки произведений. Л., Художник РСФСР, 1986.
- Связь времён. 1932—1997. Художники — члены Санкт — Петербургского Союза художников России. Каталог выставки. — Санкт-Петербург: ЦВЗ «Манеж», 1997. — с.294.
