= Alexander Pushnin =

Russian painter

Alexander Tikhonovich Pushnin
- Born: March 28, 1921; Morshansk, Tambov Province, Soviet Russia
- Died: September 5, 1991 (aged 70); Leningrad, USSR
- Education: Repin Institute of Arts
- Known for: Painting
- Movement: Realism

Alexander Tikhonovich Pushnin (Russian: Алекса́ндр Ти́хонович Пушни́н; March 28, 1921 – September 5, 1991) was a Soviet, Russian painter, Doctor of Art-criticism, professor of the Repin Institute of Arts, lived and worked in Leningrad, member of the Leningrad Union of Artists, regarded as one of the representatives of the Leningrad school of painting, most famous for his portrait and historical painting.

== Biography ==
Alexander Pushnin was born March 28, 1921, in the city Morshansk, Tambov Province, Soviet Russia.

In 1943, Pushnin entered the painting department of the Leningrad Institute of Painting, Sculpture and Architecture. He studied of Ivan Stepashkin, Mikhail Avilov, Yuri Neprintsev, Aleksandr Gerasimov.

In 1950, Pushnin graduated from Leningrad Institute of Painting, Sculpture and Architecture named after Ilya Repin in Rudolf Frentz personal Art Studio. His graduation work was a historical painting named "Vladimir Lenin in Kazan University", dedicated to Lenin's participation in student demonstrations.

Since 1948, Pushnin has participated in Art Exhibitions. He painted portraits, genre and historical compositions, landscapes, worked also in drawing and watercolors. His style featured a powerful pictorial language, a broad style of painting, sharp composition, interest in the unusual angles. His solo exhibition was in Leningrad in 1982.

Since 1950, Pushnin was a member of the Leningrad Union of Artists. He was Doctor of Art-criticism (1952) and Professor of the Leningrad Institute of Painting, Sculpture and Architecture named after Ilya Repin (1986).

Pushnin died on September 5, 1991, in Leningrad at the seventy-first year of life. His paintings reside in State Russian Museum, in Art museums and private collections in Russia, England, USA, China, Japan, France, and other countries.

== See also ==
- Leningrad School of Painting
- List of Russian artists
- List of 20th-century Russian painters
- List of painters of Saint Petersburg Union of Artists
- Saint Petersburg Union of Artists

== Bibliography ==
- L' École de Leningrad. Catalogue. - Paris: Drouot Richelieu, 21 December 1990. - p. 30-31.
- Peinture Russe. Catalogue. - Paris: Drouot Richelieu, 26 Avril, 1991. - p. 7,46-47.
- Sergei V. Ivanov. Unknown Socialist Realism. The Leningrad School. - Saint Petersburg: NP-Print Edition, 2007. – pp. 9, 27, 152, 204, 367, 384, 388, 389, 393-396, 398, 399, 403, 411, 413, 414, 416, 417, 419, 421. ISBN 5-901724-21-6, ISBN 978-5-901724-21-7.
- Anniversary Directory graduates of Saint Petersburg State Academic Institute of Painting, Sculpture, and Architecture named after Ilya Repin, Russian Academy of Arts. 1915–2005. – Saint-Petersburg: Pervotsvet Publishing House, 2007. P.63.
