= Sergey Chekhonin =

Russian painter

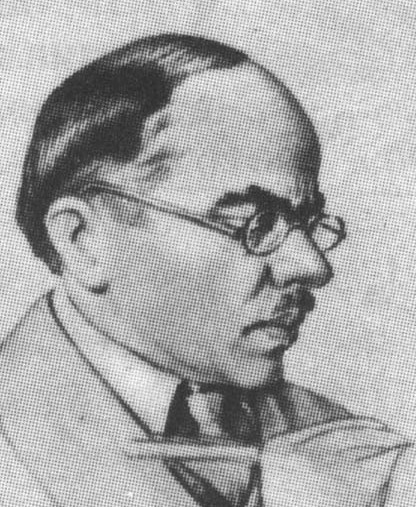
- Russian artist Sergey Tchekhonin (1878-1936)
- Born: Sergey Vasil'evich Tchehonine; 2 February 1878; Lykoshino, Novgorod Governorate, Russian Empire
- Died: 23 February 1936 (aged 58); Loerrach, Baden-Württemberg, Nazi Germany
- Known for: Graphics
- Notable work: Maxim Gorky at the Louvre

Sergey Vasil'evich Tchehonine (also Chekhonin; 2 February 1878 – 23 February 1936) was a Russian graphic artist, portrait miniaturist, ceramicist, and illustrator.

Together with Heorhiy Narbut and Dmitry Mitrokhin, Chekhonin belongs to the second generation of the World of Art, the so-called artists who entered the union in the 1910s. An artist and graphic designer, he is noted for his work in "propaganda porcelain" and his illustrations for Soviet publications. He developed a multi-color textile printing technique and his body of work includes various media. His pieces are held in several former Soviet state museums.

== Biography ==
Sergey Chekhonin was the son a railroad machinist who worked on the Nicholas Railroad. At the age of fifteen he had to begin earning his own living. He worked as a clerk, a draftsman, and a cashier at the shipping station. In 1896 he arrived in Petrograd, where he studied at the Drawing School of the Imperial Society for the Encouragement of the Arts until 1897 and at the Tenishev school until 1900, being for some time a pupil of Ilya Repin, a member of the association "World of Art". In addition, Chekhonin thoroughly studied the art of ceramics and began his career as a pottery artist, having to take part in the decoration of many large buildings at the beginning of the twentieth century, such as the "Metropol" hotel in Moscow.

Shortly after the 1905 Russian Revolution, with which he flirted, although his radicalism was very superficial, he turned to graphic design. At first he worked as a cartoonist in a satirical magazine between 1905–06, and then began designing books, which brought him considerable success. In the 1910s, he was considered as one of those artists whose work defined the high level of Russian book art. His life became even more intense after the events of the February Revolution of 1917. He was then engaged in social activities, served as artistic director of the State Porcelain Factory in Leningrad in 1918–1923, and again in 1925–1927, respectively.

In 1928, Chekhonin left the Soviet Union and emigrated to Paris. There he worked in the field of artistic industry and stage set design. He also lived in Germany, worked in theaters and engaged himself in painting porcelain and working on book design, preferring them to decorative multi-color printing painting on fabrics. He died at the age of fifty-eight on 23 February 1936 in the town of Loerrach, Germany.
