= Mikhail Anikushin =

Russian sculptor (1917–1997)

Mikhail Konstantinovich Anikushin (Russian: Михаи́л Константи́нович Анику́шин; 2 October 1917 – 18 May 1997) was a Soviet and Russian sculptor. Among his most famous works are a monument to Alexander Pushkin at Pushkinskaya Station of the Saint Petersburg Metro (1954), a monument to Alexander Pushkin at Arts Square in Saint Petersburg (1957), and a monument to Vladimir Lenin at Moskovskaya Square in Saint Petersburg.

A minor planet 3358 Anikushin discovered by Soviet astronomer Nikolai Chernykh in 1978 is named after him.

== See also ==
- 1957 in art
- List of Russian artists
- Saint Petersburg Union of Artists
