= Alexander Savinov =

Russian painter

Alexander Ivanovich Savinov
- Born: 17 July 1881; Saratov, Saratov Governorate, Russian Empire
- Died: 25 February 1942 (aged 60); Leningrad, USSR
- Education: Imperial Academy of Arts
- Known for: Painting, Graphics
- Movement: Realism

Alexander Ivanovich Savinov (Russian: Алекса́ндр Ива́нович Сави́нов, 17 July 1881 – 25 February 1942) was a Russian and Soviet painter and art educator who lived and worked in Saint Petersburg (Leningrad). He was a member of the Leningrad Union of Artists, regarded as one of the founders of the Leningrad School of painting.

== Biography ==
Savinov was born on 17 July 1881 in Saratov in the family of the merchant - timber merchants. In 1902-1908 Savinov studied at the Imperial Academy of Fine Arts in Saint Petersburg at Dmitry Kardovsky and Yan Tsionglinsky. After graduation he traveled to Italy as a pensioner of the Academy of Fine Arts.

After returning from Italy Savinov begins his teaching career, which will continue until the end of life. He oversaw the personal painting workshop in the Leningrad Institute of Painting, Sculpture and Architecture, headed the department of composition, was vice-rector for scientific and academic work. Among the pupils of Alexander Savinov in different years were Alexei Pakhomov, Mikhail Natarevich, Dmitry Mochalsky, Eugene Charushin, Ludmila Ronchevskaya and other well-known Russian artists. Among the most famous works Savinov are paintings "Portrait of the Wife" (1909), "On the Balcony" (1909), "Old Roman Models" (1910), "Portrait of Isaak Brodsky" (1910), "Portrait of Andrievskaya" (1912), "Portrait of Neslukhovskaya" (1923), "Portrait of Simonov" (1926), "Portrait of the son" (1926), "The adoption of the decree on the establishment of the Red Army" (1934).

Savinov was a member of the Leningrad Union of Soviet Artists since its inception in 1932. After the beginning of the Great Patriotic War he participated in the preparations for the evacuation of the Hermitage collection, personally ready to be sent to the rear of paintings by Rembrandt. He also worked on the posters and the manuscript of his book "The artist's work on the painting'.

Alexander Savinov died on 25 February 1942 in the besieged Leningrad at the sixty-first year of life. His works reside in State Russian Museum in Saint Petersburg, in museums and private collections in Russia, Britain, France, and other countries.

== See also ==
- Leningrad School of Painting
- List of Russian artists
- List of 20th-century Russian painters
- List of painters of Saint Petersburg Union of Artists
- Saint Petersburg Union of Artists

== Bibliography ==
- The Fine Arts of Leningrad. Exhibition catalogue. - Leningrad: Khudozhnik RSFSR, 1976. - p. 29.
- Alexander Savinov. Letters. Documents. Memories. - Leningrad: Khudozhnik RSFSR, 1983.
- Alexander Savinov. Exhibition of works. Catalogue. - Leningrad: Khudozhnik RSFSR, 1983.
- Matthew C. Bown. Dictionary of 20th Century Russian and Soviet Painters 1900-1980s. - London: Izomar, 1998. ISBN 0-9532061-0-6, ISBN 978-0-9532061-0-0.
- Time for change. The Art of 1960-1985 in the Soviet Union. - Saint Petersburg: State Russian Museum, 2006. - p. 118, 119.
- Sergei V. Ivanov. Unknown Socialist Realism. The Leningrad School. - Saint Petersburg: NP-Print Edition, 2007. – pp. 12–18, 22, 359, 363, 365, 368, 373, 378, 380-383, 390, 401, 439, 441, 444. ISBN 5-901724-21-6, ISBN 978-5-901724-21-7.
- Anniversary Directory graduates of Saint Petersburg State Academic Institute of Painting, Sculpture, and Architecture named after Ilya Repin, Russian Academy of Arts. 1915 - 2005. - Saint Petersburg: Pervotsvet Publishing House, 2007.- p. 43-46, 48. ISBN 978-5-903677-01-6.
- Pages of the Memory. Reference Memorial Collection. Members of the Leningrad Union of Soviet artists, who were killed during the Great Patriotic War and the siege of Leningrad. - St. Petersburg, Petropolis, 2010. p. 211-215.
