= Joseph Serebriany =

Russian painter (1907–1979)

- Иосиф Серебрянный
- Born: 25 April 1907; Horodnia, Chernigov Governorate, Russian Empire
- Died: 12 August 1979 (aged 72); Leningrad, Russian SFSR, Soviet Union
- Education: Repin Institute of Arts
- Known for: Painting
- Movement: Realism
- Awards: People's Artist of the Russian Federation

Joseph Alexandrovich Serebriany (Russian: Ио́сиф Алекса́ндрович Сере́бряный, romanized: Iosif Aleksandrovich Serebryany; 25 April 1907 – 12 August 1979) was a Soviet painter and stage decorator, who lived and worked in Leningrad, a member of the Leningrad Union of Artists, People's Artist of the Russian Federation, professor of the Repin Institute of Arts, regarded as one of the leading representatives of the Leningrad school of painting, well known for his portrait paintings.

== Biography ==
Joseph Serebriany. The partisan detachment. Lesgaftovtsy. 1942

In 1924-1927 studied in Tavricheskaya Art School in Leningrad. In 1927-1931 studied in Repin Institute of Arts, student of Mikhail Bobyshov, Arcady Rylov, Vasili Savinsky. Take place in Art Exhibitions since 1925. In 1931-1934 he worked as designer and stage decorator. In 1935–1941 years he painted mainly by the order in portrait and historical genre. In 1941-1945 during the Great Patriotic War and the blockade remained in Leningrad.

In 1947 Jasef Serebriany was elected a corresponding member of the Academy of Arts of the USSR. In 1948-1979 he taught in the Repin Institute of Arts as a professor of painting and a head of personal workshop. In 1965 Jasef Serebriany was awarded an honorable title of People's Artist of the Russian Federation, in 1977 of the People's Artist of the USSR. Twice he was elected chairman of the Leningrad Union of Artists (1948–1952 and 1954–1958). In 1966 he was awarded the Silver Medal of the Academy of Fine Arts of the USSR for a portrait of Dmitry Shostakovich. His works reside in the State Russian Museum, Tretyakov Gallery, in many museums and private collections in Russia, France, Ukraine, Germany, and other countries.

== See also ==
- Leningrad School of Painting
- List of 20th-century Russian painters
- List of painters of Saint Petersburg Union of Artists
- Saint Petersburg Union of Artists

== Sources ==
- Бойков В. Изобразительное искусство Ленинграда. Заметки о выставке ленинградских художников // Ленинградская правда, 1947, 29 ноября.
- Выставка произведений ленинградских художников 1951 года. Каталог. М-Л., Искусство, 1951. C.22.
- Двести лет Академии художеств СССР. Каталог выставки. Л-М., Искусство, 1958. C.236-237.
- Выставка произведений ленинградских художников 1960 года. Каталог. Л., Художник РСФСР, 1961. C.38.
- Республиканская художественная выставка «Советская Россия». Каталог. М., Советский художник, 1960. C.75.
- Бетхер-Остренко И. Художественная летопись истории // Вечерний Ленинград, 1964, 28 января.
- Ленинград. Зональная выставка. Л., Художник РСФСР, 1965. С.49.
- Аникушин М. Солнце на полотнах // Ленинградская правда, 1964, 3 ноября.
- Буткевич О. От находок к открытиям. Заметки с выставки «Ленинград» // Советская культура, 1964, 26 декабря.
- Колесова О. Две тысячи встреч. На выставке «Ленинград» // Ленинградская правда, 1964, 4 ноября.
- Вторая республиканская художественная выставка «Советская Россия». Каталог. М., Советский художник, 1965. С.36.
- Колесова О. Широка страна моя ... Творческий отчёт ленинградских художников, посвящённый 50-летию образования СССР // Ленинградская правда, 1972, 23 сентября.
- Богданов А. Славя страну труда Вечерний Ленинград, 1972, 10 октября.
- Богданов А. Ярче, но и глубже // Вечерний Ленинград, 1973, 25 декабря.
- Яковлева Л. Величие подвига // Вечерний Ленинград, 1975, 27 мая.
- И. Мямлин. Сердце с правдой вдвоём… / Ленинградская правда, 1975, 1 июня.
- Изобразительное искусство Ленинграда. Каталог выставки. Л., Художник РСФСР, 1976. C.30.
- Справочник членов Союза художников СССР. Т.2 М., Советский художник, 1979. C.337.
- Справочник членов Ленинградской организации Союза художников РСФСР. Л., Художник РСФСР, 1972. C.49.
- Matthew Cullerne Bown. A Dictionary of Twentieth Century Russian And Soviet Painters. 1900 — 1980s. London. Izomar Limited, 1998.
- Юбилейный Справочник выпускников Санкт-Петербургского академического института живописи, скульптуры и архитектуры имени И. Е. Репина Российской Академии художеств. 1915—2005. СПб., Первоцвет, 2007. С.35.
- Государственный Русский музей. Живопись первой половины ХХ века (К) // Альманах. Вып.226. СПб., Palace Edition, 2008. С.15.
