= Vladimir Konashevich =

Graphic artist

Vladimir Mikhaylovich Konashevich (Russian: Владимир Михайлович Конашевич, May 19, 1888, Novocherkassk—February 27, 1963, Leningrad, now Saint Petersburg) was a Russian graphic artist and illustrator. Among his artwork are scores for Manon Lescaut and Andersen's The Fairy Tales.

Konashevich also illustrated the works of Samuil Marshak and issues of the publishing house Academia. His story O sebye i svoyom dele (About Me and My Work) was published in 1968.

His illustrations for Daniil Kharms' игра (Play) can be seen in The Fire Horse: Children's Poems By Mayakovsky, Mandelstam and Kharms (tr. Eugene Ostashevsky), New York: NYRB 2017

== Bibliography ==
- Parygin, A., Vladimir Konaševič // Allgemeines Künstlerlexikon (AKL). Die Bildenden Künstler aller Zeiten und Völker [Artists of the World]. De Gryuter. — Band 81 — 2013.
