= 1948 in fine arts of the Soviet Union =

The year 1948 was marked by many events that left an imprint on the history of Soviet and Russian fine arts.

== Events ==
- The Repin Institute of Arts graduated young artists Lev Bogomolets, Pavel Boronkin, Nikolai Brandt, Vitaly Valtsev, Praskovia Derbizova, Semion Levenkov, Semion Rotnitsky, Ivan Sorokin, Lev Chegorovsky, Lidya Sharleman, and others.
- May 8 — The Fine Art Exhibition named «30th Years of the Soviet Armed Forces» was opened in Moscow in the Pushkin museum. The participants were Mikhail Avilov, Olga Bogaevskaya, Isaak Brodsky, Aleksandr Gerasimov, Mitrofan Grekov, Yuri Neprintsev, Yaroslav Nikolaev, Alexander Samokhvalov, and other important Soviet artists.
- The House of creation named Academicheskaya Dacha was opened in Tver Province near the Vyshny Volochyok town at the eight kilometers from the railway station in a picturesque location on the banks of Msta River and Mstino lake.

== Deaths ==
- February 26 — Lev Bruny (Russian: Бруни Лев Александрович), Russian soviet artist (born 1894).
- May 1 — David Shterenberg (Russian: Штеренберг Давид Петрович), Russian soviet painter and graphic artist (born 1881).
- November 15 — Nikolai Ionin (Russian: Ионин Николай Александровичч), Russian soviet painter and graphic artist (born 1890).
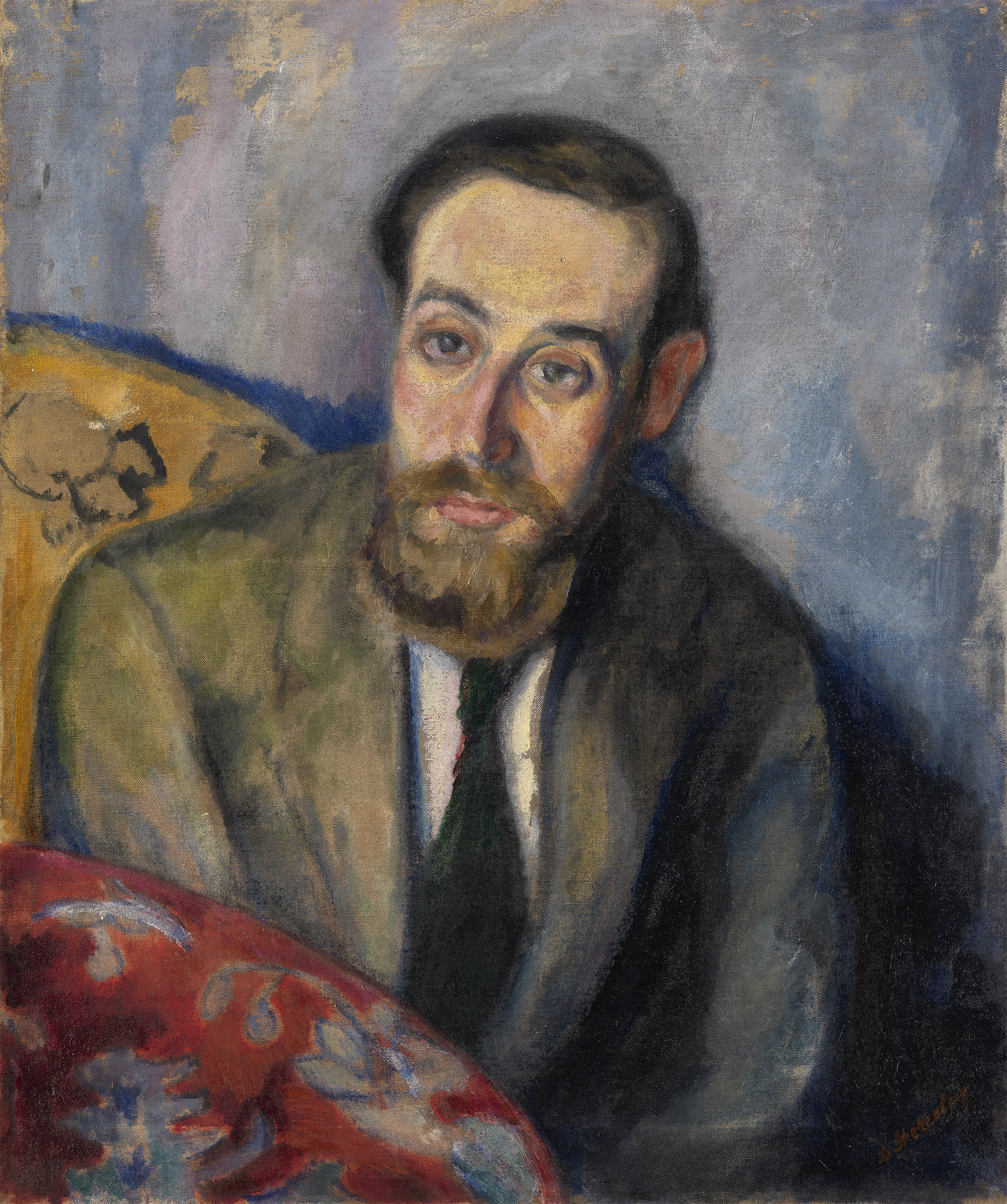
David Shterenberg — Self Portrait

== See also ==
- List of Russian artists
- List of painters of Leningrad Union of Artists
- Saint Petersburg Union of Artists
- Russian culture
- 1948 in the Soviet Union

== Sources ==
- Всесоюзная выставка работ молодых художников, посвященная 30-летию ВЛКСМ. Живопись. Скульптура. Графика. Каталог. М-Л., Искусство, 1948.
- Художественная выставка "30 лет Советских Вооруженных сил. 1918-1948. Живопись. Скульптура. Графика. Каталог выставки. М., 1948.
- Artists of Peoples of the USSR. Biography Dictionary. Vol. 1. Moscow, Iskusstvo, 1970.
- Artists of Peoples of the USSR. Biography Dictionary. Vol. 2. Moscow, Iskusstvo, 1972.
- Directory of Members of Union of Artists of USSR. Volume 1,2. Moscow, Soviet Artist Edition, 1979.
- Directory of Members of the Leningrad branch of the Union of Artists of Russian Federation. Leningrad, Khudozhnik RSFSR, 1980.
- Artists of Peoples of the USSR. Biography Dictionary. Vol. 4 Book 1. Moscow, Iskusstvo, 1983.
- Directory of Members of the Leningrad branch of the Union of Artists of Russian Federation. - Leningrad: Khudozhnik RSFSR, 1987.
- Artists of peoples of the USSR. Biography Dictionary. Vol. 4 Book 2. - Saint Petersburg: Academic project humanitarian agency, 1995.
- Link of Times: 1932 - 1997. Artists - Members of Saint Petersburg Union of Artists of Russia. Exhibition catalogue. - Saint Petersburg: Manezh Central Exhibition Hall, 1997.
- Matthew C. Bown. Dictionary of 20th Century Russian and Soviet Painters 1900-1980s. - London: Izomar, 1998.
- Vern G. Swanson. Soviet Impressionism. - Woodbridge, England: Antique Collectors' Club, 2001.
- Время перемен. Искусство 1960—1985 в Советском Союзе. СПб., Государственный Русский музей, 2006.
- Sergei V. Ivanov. Unknown Socialist Realism. The Leningrad School. - Saint-Petersburg: NP-Print Edition, 2007. - ISBN 5-901724-21-6, ISBN 978-5-901724-21-7.
- Anniversary Directory graduates of Saint Petersburg State Academic Institute of Painting, Sculpture, and Architecture named after Ilya Repin, Russian Academy of Arts. 1915 - 2005. - Saint Petersburg: Pervotsvet Publishing House, 2007.
