= 1948 in the Soviet Union =

- Decades: 1920s; 1930s; 1940s; 1950s; 1960s
- See also: History of the Soviet Union; List of years in the Soviet Union

The following lists events that happened during 1948 in the Union of Soviet Socialist Republics.

== Incumbents ==
- General Secretary of the Communist Party of the Soviet Union – Joseph Stalin
- Chairman of the Presidium of the Supreme Soviet of the Soviet Union – Nikolay Shvernik
- Chairman of the Council of Ministers of the Soviet Union – Joseph Stalin

== Events ==
- Joseph Stalin sends the first advisers to China in an effort to repair the economic damage brought on by years of civil war.
- At the request of Mao Zedong, Joseph Stalin Sends railroad construction expert I.V. Kovalev with a team of 300 engineers and laborers to repair deteriorated or destroyed Manchurian railways.
- March 10 – Extreme restrictions are placed on German traffic from the Soviet Zone into Berlin.
- June 24 – The Soviets implement a total blockade of all ground and water transport into or out of Berlin. The blockade will last nearly a full year, ending May 12, 1949.

== Births ==
- January 1 — Pavel Grachev, 2nd Minister of Denfence (d. 2012)
- January 10 — Mischa Maisky, cellist
- January 14 — Valeri Kharlamov, ice hockey player (d. 1981)
- January 20 — Natan Sharansky
- January 27
  - Mikhail Baryshnikov, Latvian and American dancer, choreographer and actor
  - Otari Kvantrishvili, Georgian Mafia boss (d. 1994)
- March 20 — Helene Vannari, Estonian stage, radio, television and film actress (d. 2022)
- March 26 — Gayyur Yunus, Azerbaijani painter
- April 13 — Mikhail Shufutinsky, Russian pop singer
- May 2 — Vladimir Matorin, Russian opera singer
- May 31 — Svetlana Alexievich, Belarusian investigative journalist, essayist and oral historian
- June 1 — Juhan Viiding, Estonian poet and actor (d. 1995)
- June 30 — Vladimir Yakunin, former President of Russian Railways
- July 16 — Mariia Stefiuk
- July 21 — Mikhail Zadornov, Soviet and Russian stand-up comedian and writer (d. 2017)
- August 23 — Lev Zelyony, Soviet and Russian physicist
- August 28 — Natalya Gundareva, Russian film and theatre actress (d. 2005)
- August 30 — Victor Skumin, Soviet and Russian scientist, psychiatrist, philosopher and writer
- September 19 — Nadiya Tkachenko, Ukrainian pentathlete
- September 25 — Vladimir Yevtushenko, billionaire and oligarch
- November 9 — Viktor Matviyenko, Soviet and Ukrainian footballer and coach (d. 2018)

== Deaths ==
- January 13 — Solomon Mikhoels, actor and artistic director of the Moscow State Jewish Theater (b. 1890)
- February 11 — Sergei Eisenstein, film director (b. 1898)
- March 23 — Yevgeniy Abalakov, mountaineer and sculptor (b. 1907)
- April 19 — Mikhail Rostovtsev, bass, opera and operetta singer and actor (b. 1872)
- May 1 — David Shterenberg, painter and graphic artist (b. 1881)
- July 28 — Nikolai Podvoisky, Bolshevik revolutionary and statesman (b. 1880)
- August 31 — Andrei Zhdanov, Second Secretary of the Communist Party of the Soviet Union (b. 1896)
- September 30 — Vasily Kachalov, actor (b. 1875)
- October 25 — Boris Fomin, musician (b. 1900)

== See also ==
- 1948 in fine arts of the Soviet Union
- List of Soviet films of 1948
