= Vasily Kokorev =

Russian businessman

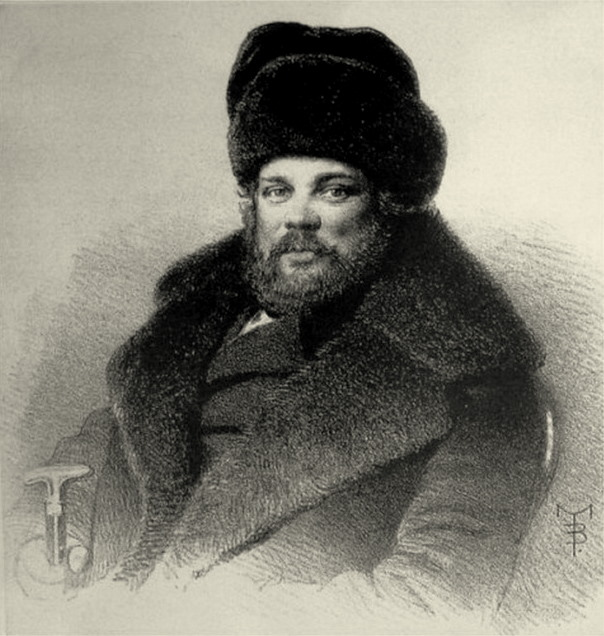
Vasily Kokorev (1860s); portrait by Georg Wilhelm Timm

Vasily Aleksandrovich Kokorev (Russian: Василий Александрович Кокорев, 23 April 1817, Soligalich - 22 April 1889, Saint Petersburg) was one of the wealthiest men in Russia. In addition to being a landowner, entrepreneur and philanthropist, he was a noted art collector and an honorary member of the Imperial Academy of Arts.

== Biography ==
He was born to a family of Old Believers. His father was a merchant, who owned a small salt processing plant. After his parents had died, he became a co-owner of the plant and served as its manager from 1836 to 1841. At that time, the import duty on salt was abolished, the plant became unprofitable, and he left to seek his fortune elsewhere.

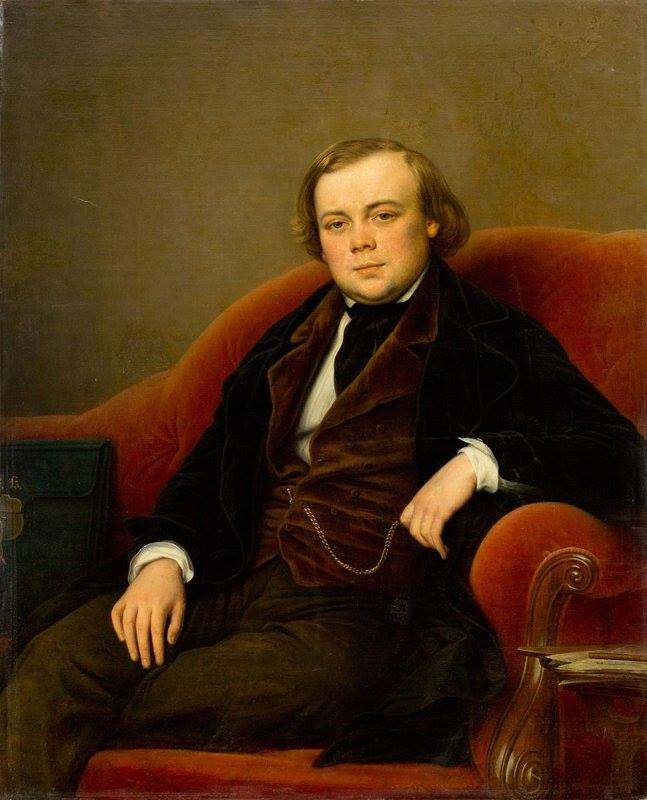
Vasily Kokorev (late 1840s); portrait by Charles de Steuben

He began as an assistant manager at a distillery in Orenburg Governorate then, in 1842, became a clerk for a wine farmer in Kazan. Two years later, he submitted a suggestion to the government, proposing ways to improve the wine-making business. He called his system "питейного дохода" (drinking income). To prove his method, he was given control of a farm in Oryol Governorate that was 300,000 Rubles in debt. A government expert on commerce, Ivan Mamontov, was named to be his assistant (and observer). When the farm began to generate income, he was assigned to oversee twenty-three more farms that were in receivership. In 1847, his system became an official policy. Shortly after, he married. He and his wife, Vera, had four sons, who became merchants, and three daughters, who all married merchants.

By 1850, he was able to acquire an estate in Moscow. The following year, he was given the honorary title of "Commerce Advisor". In 1857, he was co-founder of a joint stock company, concerned with food and other animal products then, together with Baron Nicolaus von Tornauw and the entrepreneur Nikolai Novoselsky, created the "Trans-Caspian Trade Partnership". Their first project was a kerosene plant, near Baku. By the early 1860s, his wealth was estimated at between seven and eight million Rubles.

He was also involved in the construction of the Volga-Don Railway (1858), Moscow-Kursk Railway (1871), and the Ural Railroad (1874). His contributions to establishing the Russian Steam Navigation and Trading Company led to his involvement in the building of oil barges. Banks, telegraph companies and public transit were also among his financial interests. He was a major contributor to the failed Balkan Mission of General Mikhail Chernyayev, just prior to the Russo-Turkish War.

Throughout his career he was a strong advocate for economic reforms; publishing a series of influential articles in various newspapers and magazines. In the late 1850s, he was among those calling for the abolition of serfdom, and proposed a plan for accomplishing it. He asserted that Russia should find its own economic forms, rather than borrowing those of Western Europe and that Germany was its only reliable ally. His views were summed up in his pessimistic book, Экономические провалы (Economic Failures), published two years before his death.

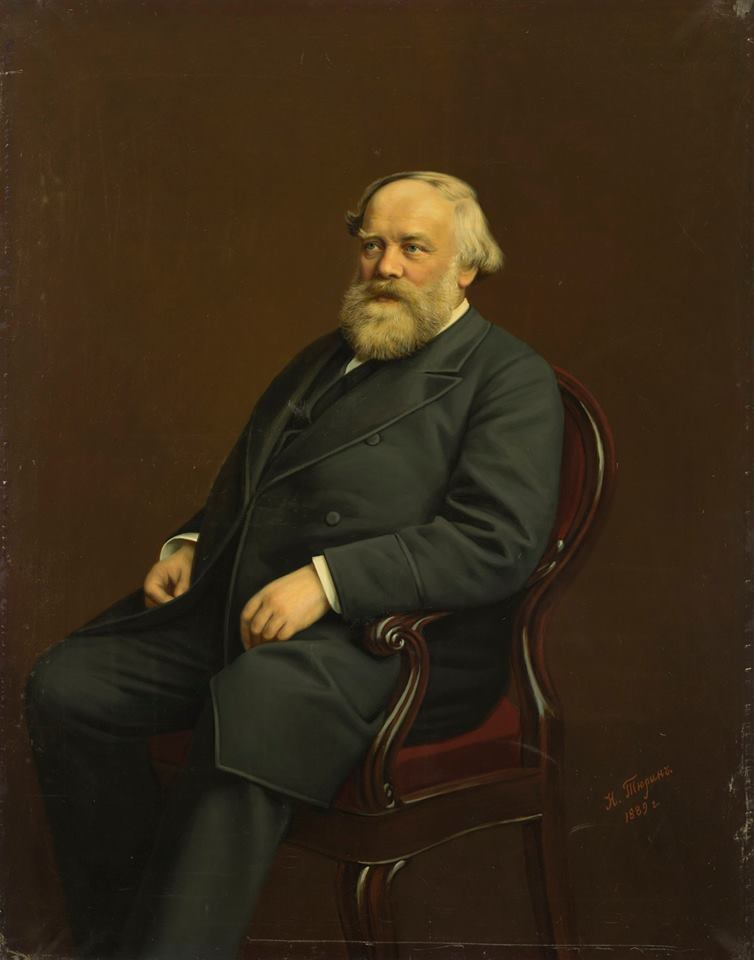
Vasily Kokorev (1889); portrait by Ivan Tyurin

By the beginning of the 1880s, he had made several unwise investment decisions, and lost some of his influence among government officials. Although he remained quite wealthy, his net worth declined, until his death from a heart attack at the age of seventy-one.

== Patron of the arts ==
In the mid-1850s, he began collecting paintings by both Russian and foreign artists and, in 1861, he had a gallery built in central Moscow to house them, designed by Ivan Chernik. It was opened to the public in 1862, with eights rooms of art, a large lecture hall, and the "Tivoli" restaurant; a buffet which was also a tavern. The collection is estimated to have contained 430 paintings and 35 sculptures. More than forty of the canvases were by Karl Bryullov, including copies of two of his works in the Imperial Collection, made by one of his students. Ivan Aivazovsky and Alexey Bogolyubov were also well-represented.

In 1870, due to financial difficulties, most of the collection was sold to the Ministry of the Imperial Court. Many were also acquired by Pavel Tretyakov and Dmitri Botkin, for their galleries.

In 1884, what came to be known as the Akademicheskaya Dacha opened near the town of Vyshny Volochyok, on the banks of the Msta River and Lake Mstino. The "Academic Cottages" that made up the heart of the compound were contributed and maintained by Kokorev. It was designed as a place where underprivileged students from the Imperial Academy could spend their summers. Each cottage had a dining room, library, workshop and music room. Among the numerous artists who stayed there were Pavel Chistyakov, Arkhip Kuindzhi, Valentin Serov, Isaac Brodsky and Ilya Repin; after whom the facility was named in 1964. A plaque, commemorating Kokorev's contributions, was placed in 2004.

== Sources ==
- "Vasily Kokorev". Brockhaus and Efron Encyclopedic Dictionary: In 86 Volumes (82 Volumes and 4 Additional Volumes) (in Russian). St. Petersburg: F. A. Brockhaus. 1890–1907.
- N. A. Filatkina, "Василий Александрович Кокорев (1817—1889)", In: Московский журнал, #8, 2015 (Online)
- L. N. Zhukova and O. G. Zhukova, Русское купечество: Гении Дела и творцы истории, Вече, 2017 ISBN 978-5-4444-6215-7
