= Akademicheskaya Dacha =

Russian painter

Coordinates: 57.727065°N 34.471985°E

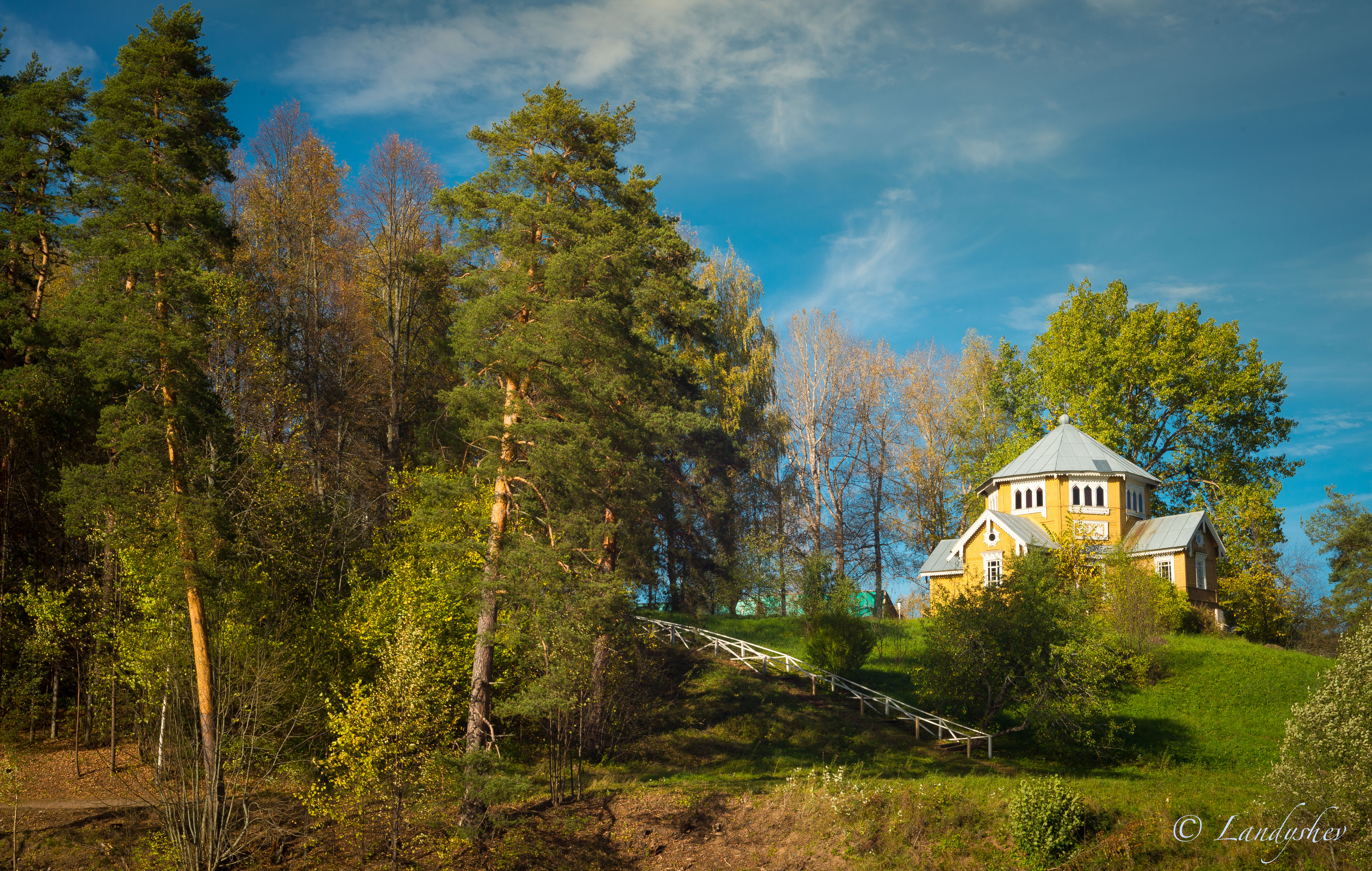
Akademicheskaya Dacha

Akademicheskaya Dacha (Russian: Академическая Дача) is a dacha (summer house) known as the oldest and major creative base of the Union of Artists of the Russian Federation. It is located near the town of Vyshny Volochyok in Tver Province, in a picturesque location on the banks of Msta River and Lake Mstino. In a broader sense, the Akademicheskaya Dacha (or "Akademichka") refers to the entire surrounding area including villages of Bolshoy Gorodok, Maliy Gorodok, Kisharino, Terpigorevo, Valentinovka and Podol, where many Russian artists resided in the mid-second half of the 20th century.

== History ==
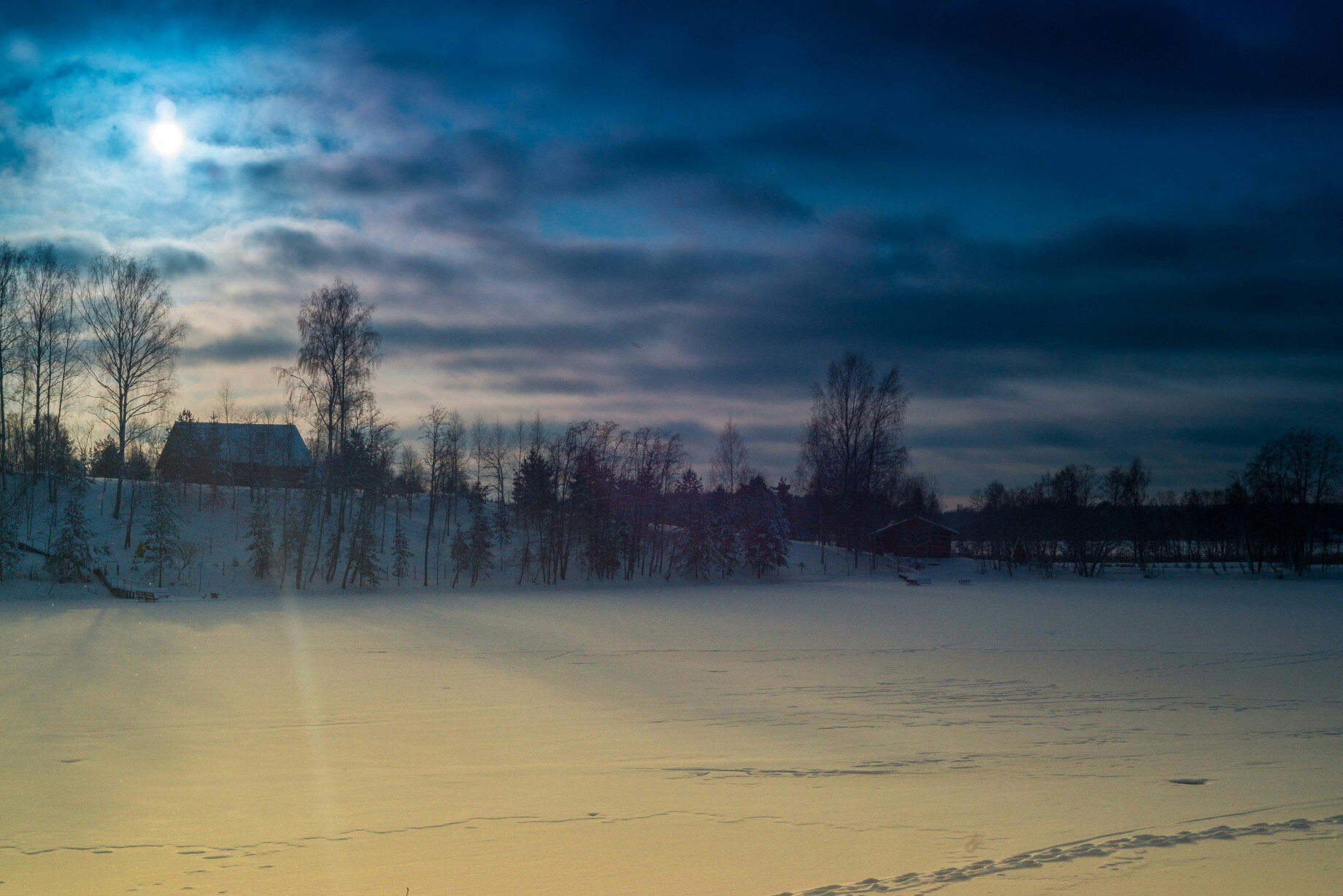
A view of frozen Msta River from the Dacha

The Akademicheskaya Dacha was opened on July 22, 1884, as a place of summer practice for poor students of the Imperial Academy of Arts. A plot of land with the park, house and buildings had been taken on lease by the Academy of Arts from the Ministry of Railways. It was originally named as "Vladimir and Maria shelter" in honor of Grand Duke Vladimir, president of the Imperial Academy of Arts, and his wife Grand Duchess Maria Pavlovna and the Empress Maria Alexandrovna. The exceptional role in Dacha's organization were the "Academic cottages" belonging to her guardian Vasily Kokorev, a major industrialist, and the owner of one of the largest collections of Russian and Western European art.

Before the October Revolution of 1917, many famous Russian artists worked on the Akademicheskaya Dacha, including Ilya Repin, Nikolay Bogdanov-Belsky, Pavel Chistyakov, Arkhip Kuindzhi, Isaac Levitan, Andrei Ryabushkin, Nicholas Roerich and Valentin Serov. After 1917 the house was given to the children for an open summer camp. Its artistic purpose was restored only in 1948. Since that time the Dacha has become one of the recognized centers of creative life in the Soviet Union and Russia. In those years here worked Russian painters Aleksei Gritsai, Vecheslav Zagonek, Dmitry Maevsky, Maya Kopitseva, Fyodor Reshetnikov, Nikolai Pozdneev, Nikolai Timkov, and many others. It is no accident, noting the role of the Akademicheskaya Dacha in preserving and promoting the traditions of Russian realistic Art, that it is called the "Russian Barbizon". The best art works of landscape and genre painting, exhibited in Art Shows of 1960s-1980s, were created primarily on the Dacha and its surroundings. Later in the 1970s-1980s, modern workshops and office buildings were built, providing year-round use of the Dacha for artistic purposes.

In 1964, the Akademicheskaya Dacha was named after the famous Russian painter Ilya Repin. In 1974, near the main pavilion a monument to Ilya Repin was erected, designed by sculptor Oleg Komov and architect Nikolai Komov, in honor of the 130th anniversary of the artist's birth. In 2004, during celebration of the 120th anniversary of the Akademicheskaya Dacha, a plaque in memory of Vasily Kokorev was open at the main pavilion building.

== Academics ==
Russian artists who worked at the Akademicheskaya Dacha and its surroundings since the end of the 19th century:

- Ilya Repin
- Nikolay Bogdanov-Belsky
- Isaak Brodsky
- Pavel Chistyakov
- Arkhip Kuindzhi
- Isaac Levitan
- Andrei Ryabushkin
- Nicholas Roerich
- Valentin Serov
- Sergey Gerasimov
- Aleksei Gritsai
- Maya Kopitseva
- Boris Lavrenko
- Dmitry Maevsky
- Samuil Nevelshtein
- Nikolai Pozdneev
- Nikolai Timkov
- Anatoli Vasiliev
- Boris Ugarov

== See also ==
- List of Russian artists
- List of 20th-century Russian painters
- List of painters of Saint Petersburg Union of Artists
- List of the Russian Landscape painters
- Saint Petersburg Union of Artists
- Leningrad School of Painting

== Bibliography ==
- Романычева И. Академическая дача. Л., Художник РСФСР, 1975.
- Sergei V. Ivanov. Unknown Socialist Realism. The Leningrad School. Saint Petersburg, NP-Print Edition, 2007. PP.22–24, 40-41, 93, 98-99, 117-118, 194, 202, 223, 248, 261, 312, 335, 364, 377, 388.
- Романычева И. Академическая дача. История и традиции. СПб., Петрополь, 2009.
- Академическая дача. Каталог выставки. СПб., 2009.
