= Aleksei Gritsai =

Russian artist (1914–1998)

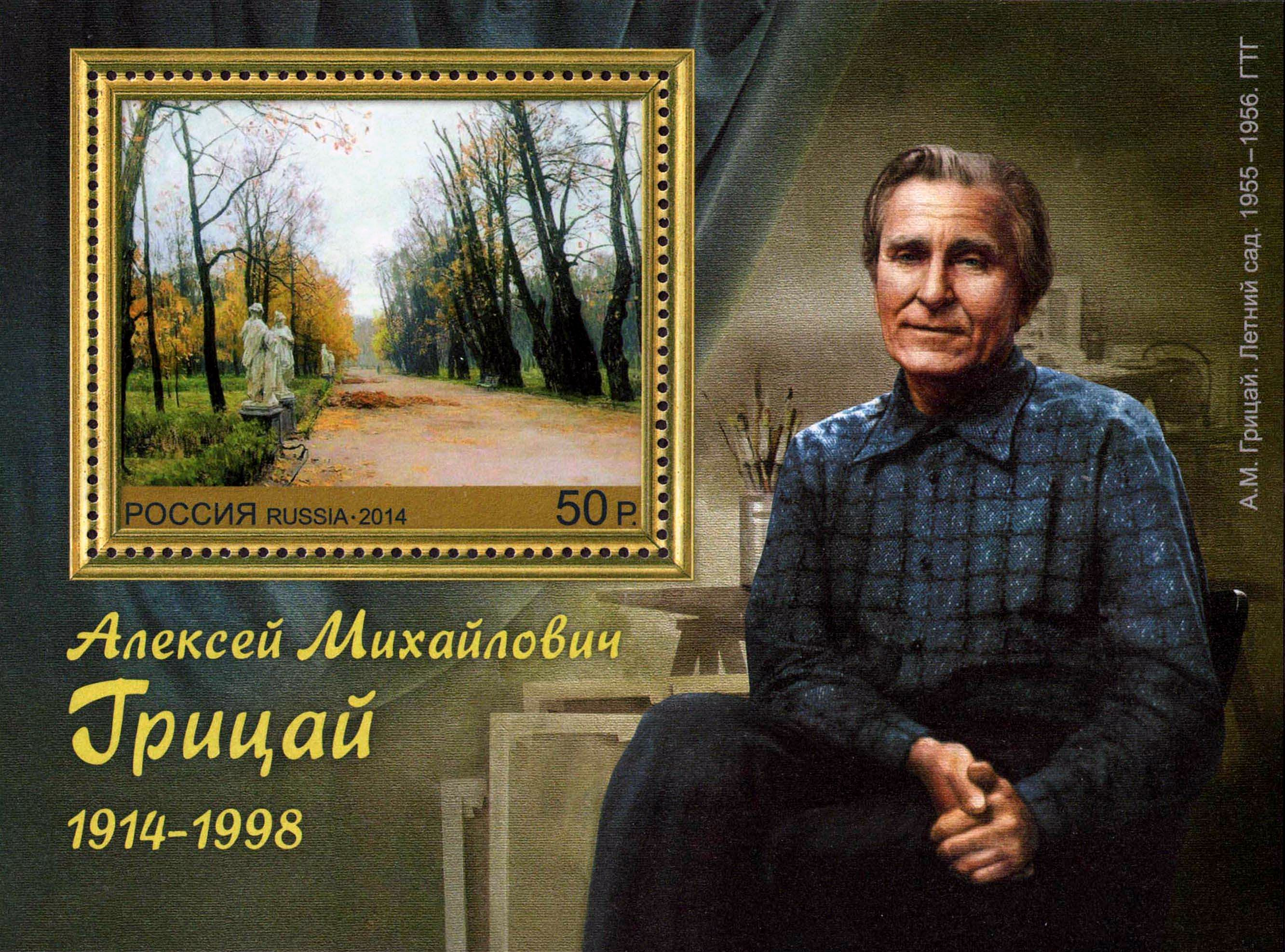
Aleksei Gritsai on a 2014 Russian stamp

Aleksei Mikhailovich Gritsai (Russian: Алексей Михайлович Грицай; 7 March 1914, Saint Petersburg – 6 May 1998, Moscow) was a Soviet and Russian artist. From 1924 to 1931 he studied in Leningrad in the studios of S.M. Zaidenberg and from 1932 to 1939 at the Academy of Arts under P. S. Naumov, Vasily Yakovlev, and Isaak Brodsky.

Gritsai became best known as a landscape painter with a deep appreciation for the power of nature to provide inspiration for humanity. He believed that since humans are a part of nature they can find joy and consolation through positive interaction with it. Due to the reduced mobility brought by sickness at the end of his life, he was unable to work directly in nature and had to rely on his memory. Because of this, much of his final work is imbued with the poignancy of reminiscence.

Gritsai was a People's Artist of the USSR (Russian: Народный Художник СССР; 1974), an academician of the USSR Academy of Arts (1964), the laureate of two Stalin Prizes (1951 and 1952) and one USSR State Prize (1978).
