= Aleksandr Laktionov (painter) =

Russian painter

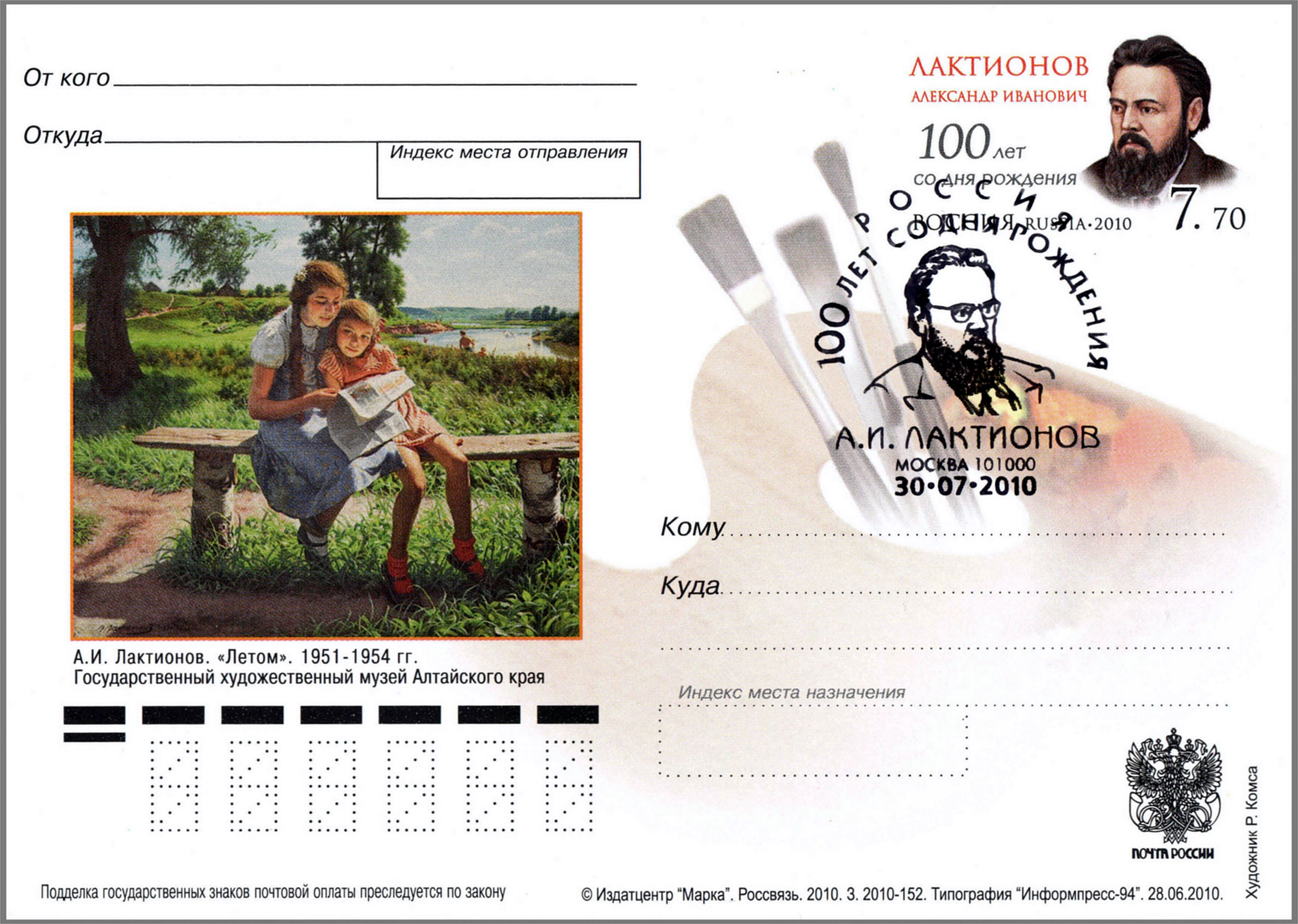
The reproduction of the painting In Summer (1951–1954) by A. Laktionov on the postal card issued to commemorate the 100th birth anniversary of the painter. Russian Post, 2010.

Aleksandr Ivanovich Laktionov (Russian: Александр Иванович Лактионов; 29 May 1910 [O.S. 16 May] – 15 March 1972) was a Socialist realism painter in the post-war Soviet Union. His meticulous and almost photo-real style was popular, but courted controversy among art critics and other artists.

Laktionov was born in Rostov-on-Don and studied in the Leningrad Academy of Arts from 1926 to 1929 and later as a postgraduate from 1938 to 1944. Laktionov was a pupil of the artist Isaak Brodsky and was influenced by his technical and realistic approach, which followed the traditions of the Old Masters.

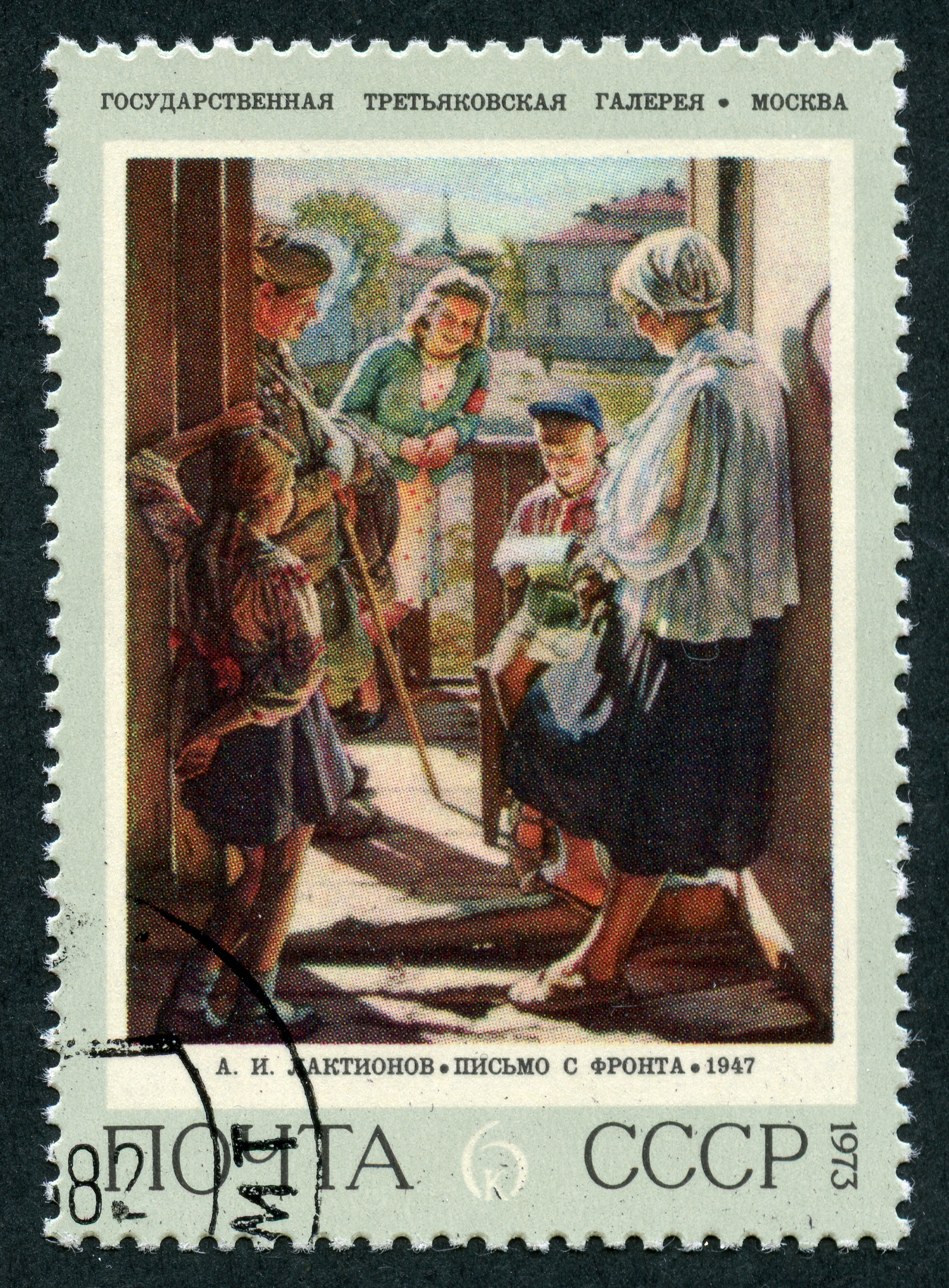
A Letter From the Front on a USSR postage stamp of 1973.

Laktionov's breakthrough work was A Letter From the Front (1947), which captured the prevailing mood among the people of the Soviet Union following the German-Soviet War. It is a highly optimistic work, bathed in a warm glow, which became a motif of Laktionov's later works and Socialist realism in general.

Laktionov became most famous for his genre paintings such as Into a New Flat (1952) and Old Age Provided For (1958–60). These painstakingly realistic works paint an overwhelmingly positive picture of Soviet society. Nonetheless, these paintings proved popular among the general public, despite their mixed critical reception. This criticism was leveled mainly at Laktionov's trademark attention to detail that, they claimed, eschews artistic expression in favor of naturalism.

In spite of this, Laktionov found many supporters in the state cultural bureaucracy, who approved of his nationalistic and optimistic subject matter. This ensured that Laktionov was able to lead a highly successful career and mix in the highest echelons of Soviet society. Throughout his later years he was commissioned to paint numerous portraits of leading Soviet actors, surgeons, soldiers, politicians and cosmonauts, including a portrait of Joseph Stalin.

== Bibliography ==
- Sergei V. Ivanov. Unknown Socialist Realism. The Leningrad School. Saint Petersburg: NP - Print, 2007. ISBN 978-5-901724-21-7, ISBN 5-901724-21-6
