= David Shterenberg =

Russian painter (1881–1948)

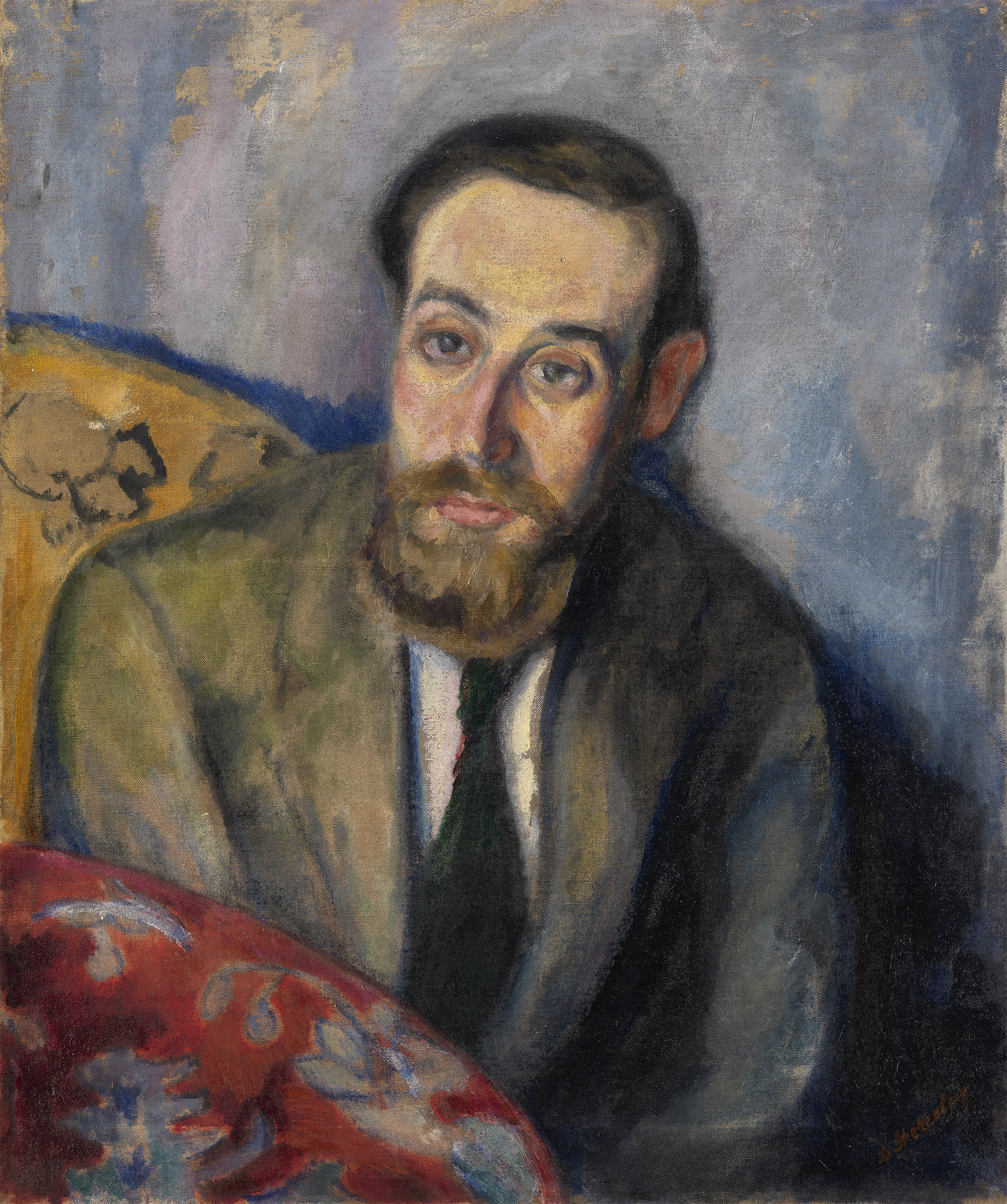
Self-portrait

David Petrovich Shterenberg (Russian: Давид Петрович Штеренберг; 26 July [O.S. 14 July] 1881 Zhitomir – May 1, 1948 Moscow) was a Ukrainian-born Russian and Soviet painter and graphic artist.

== Life ==
Born to a Jewish family in Zhitomir (present-day Ukraine), Shterenberg studied art in Odessa and then from 1906 to 1912 based himself in Paris where he studied with, amongst others, Kees van Dongen. He studied at the Académie Vitti in Paris. He was influenced by the works of Paul Cézanne and by Cubism.

He made return visits to Russia but did not settle there until after the Revolution of 1917, when he was supported by his acquaintance Lunacharsky, who was the People's Commissar responsible for culture. He attended the Conference of Authors, Artists and Directors on cooperation with the Soviet Government at the Smolny Palace in Petrograd (St.Petersburg) with Nathan Altman and others . In 1917 -1918 he was a Commissar for Artistic Matters. In 1918 he had an exhibition with the group Jewish Society for the Furthering of the Arts together with Baranoff-Rossine, Altman, and Lissitzky, in Moscow. From 1918 to 1920 he was the Head of the Department of Fine Arts (IZO) of the People's Commissariat of Enlightenment (NARKOMPROS). In 1918 he published his programmatic essay Tasks of Contemporary Art in the News of the Petrograd Council.

In 1920 Shterenberg was the Director of the Department of Fine Arts (IZO) at the People's Commissariat for Education. In this role he organised the funding of the Moscow based Institute of Artistic Culture (INKhUK). He explained that "We organised the INKhUK as a cell for the determination of scientific hypotheses on matters of art".

From 1920 to 1930 Shterenberg taught at the VKhUTEMAS. He showed at an exhibition of Jewish artists in Moscow in 1922 which also featured Marc Chagall. In the same year he wrote an essay for the catalogue of the First Russian Art Exhibition at the Gallery van Diemen, in Berlin. However his independent style ceased to find favour with the Soviet authorities and gradually his work was withdrawn from public view. After the 1930s he was forced to work in a more 'realistic' style. By his death in 1948 he was virtually forgotten. He is buried in Vagankovo Cemetery in Moscow.

Shterenberg was deeply conscious of his Jewish roots. He wrote to his wife Nadezhda: 'I have an Oriental blood in my veins, blood of my forebears who wrote the 'Song of Songs', – and there's no better song.''

Today his work is on view in public galleries in Moscow (Tretyakov Gallery and Pushkin Museum), St. Petersburg (Russian Museum) and Ekaterinburg. Much is still held in private collections in Russia. In 2019, David Shterenberg's work, along with works by Wassily Kandinsky, Kazimir Malevich, Vladimir Tatlin, Mikhail Larionov, Lyubov Popova and others, were featured in a major group exhibition, Avant-Garde: List No. 1, presented at the Tretyakov Gallery.

== Links to pictures ==
- The artist's wife
- Still life with cherries
- Still life (1948 - in the 'approved' style).

== Sources ==
- Lazarev, Mikhail (ed.), (2000).David Shterenberg. Moscow. ISBN 978-5-8163-0013-1
