= Smolny =

Government compound in Saint Petersburg, Russia

Coordinates: 59.948°N 30.395°E

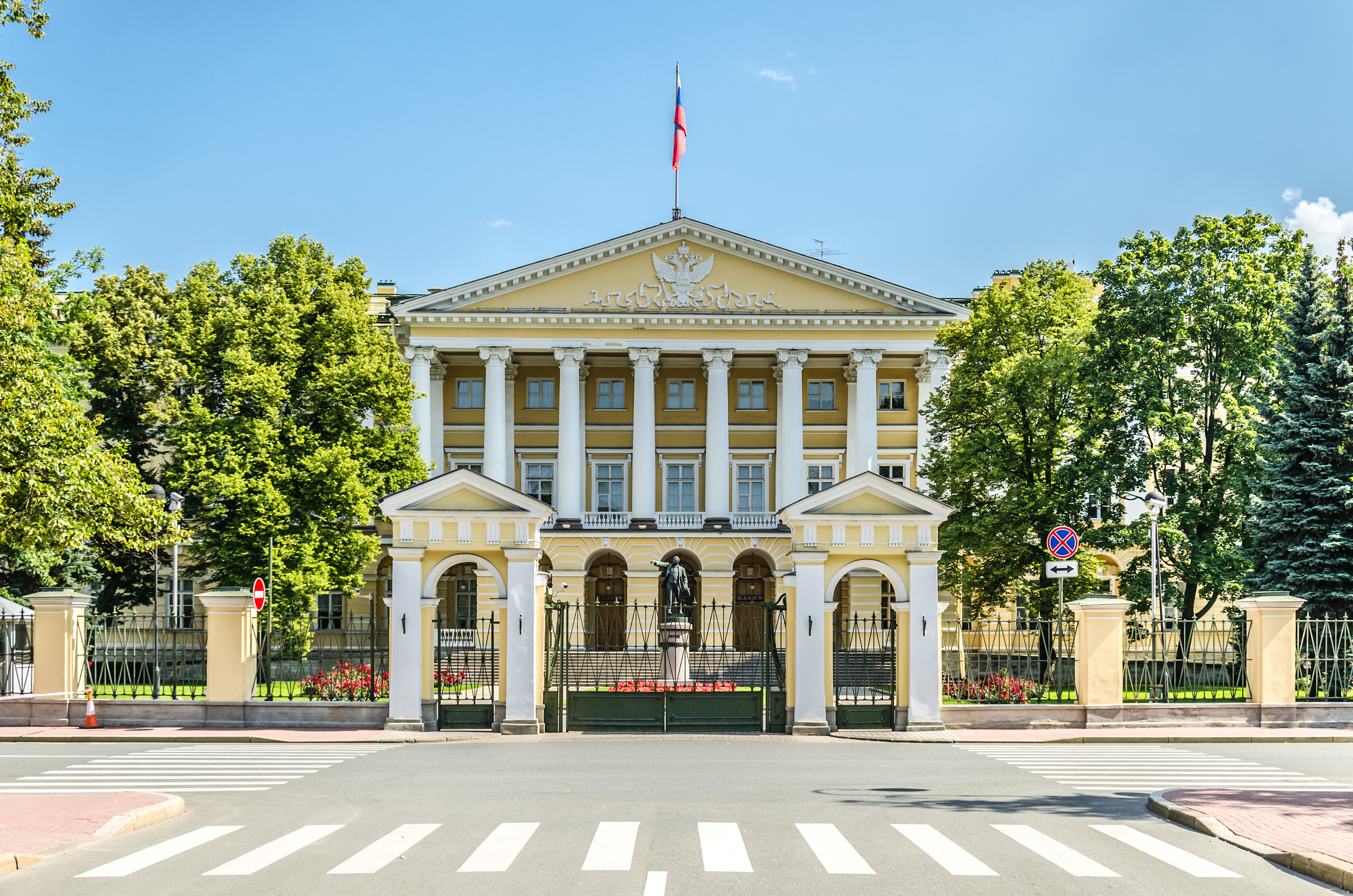
Smolny's front entrance

Smolny is a place name in central Saint Petersburg, Russia. It is a compound of historically interrelated buildings erected in 18th and 19th centuries. As the most widely known of the buildings, the Smolny Institute, has been used as the seat of the City Governor's Office; its name is associated with city authorities.

From late 1917 until 1991 it was mostly associated with the October Revolution of 1917 and Vladimir Lenin, who lived and worked there from late 1917 to early 1918.

A pre-1917 educational facility for young ladies gave rise after 1991 to a number of similarly named places of learning in the city because of the high prestige of the original one in popular culture.

== History ==
=== Tarring Yard ===
"Smolny" was short for the Russian Smolny dvor ("The Tarring Yard"), referring to its original function as a yard for covering the hulls of wooden ships with tar to make them waterproof and protected from rot and vermin. In the 18th century, this place was located outside of St. Petersburg, but close to the city limits.

=== Nunnery ===
In the mid-18th century, Empress Elizabeth of Russia ordered the construction of a Russian Orthodox nunnery, Smolny Convent, where she supposedly wanted to retire in old age. It became a local historical landmark due to its Baroque cathedral, designed by Francesco Rastrelli. The convent had a number of gardens and a hospice.

=== Institute ===
==== Pre-1917 ====
In the 19th century, the compound received an addition in the form of a Neoclassical building that became the home of the original Smolny Institute— the first and best known royal educational institution for young ladies of noble birth.

==== In 1917–1918 and later ====
Prior to the revolutionary events of 1917, the building was vacated by the institute and was taken over by Soviets. It was here on November 7, 1917 (this date corresponds to October 25 on the Julian calendar, which was still in use in Russia), that Vladimir Lenin declared that his Bolshevik faction of the Russian Social Democratic Labour Party had usurped power from the Provisional Government (which had assumed power following the abdication of Tsar Nicholas II earlier that year). Lenin and his government worked in the building, and he also lived there with his wife, until they moved to safety in Moscow in 1918, effectively transferring the capital from St. Petersburg to Moscow.

Smolny served as the headquarters of the Leningrad Front during the siege in the Second World War.

The institute building was used as the seat of the city authorities until 1991. As primary power lay in the hands of the Communist Party of the Soviet Union and its local branches, the building was occupied by the party's local officers for the city (which had been renamed "Leningrad") and, more importantly, the officers for the Leningrad Oblast. Since that time, the building has been used by the city's executive branch of power (the mayor, and later governor, of the city). Lenin's memorial apartment in the building has been preserved as a historical museum.

Buildings of the convent have been used as the offices of various organisations. One of the Smolny compound buildings houses the Schools of Sociology and International Relationships of Saint Petersburg State University.

==== Use of the name of Smolny Institute since 1991 ====
Since 1991, the name "Smolny Institute" has been revived by several different educational establishments. Before 2011, Saint Petersburg State University's semi-independent Smolny Institute of Liberal Arts and Sciences (Smolny College, Rus. Смольный институт свободных искусств и наук) offered joint study programs with Bard College in the United States. In 2011, this institute was converted into the School (or Faculty, Rus. факультет) of Liberal Arts and Sciences. It is now located in another part of downtown Saint Petersburg.

The name "Smolny Institute" is used by another St. Petersburg-based school, which was established under the auspices of the Russian Academy of Education by local Azerbaijani-born entrepreneur and academic Geydar Imanov at the offices of his company, Electrokeramika. It was known as Smolny University until 2011 (universities have a higher status under the Russian Higher and Post-graduate Education Act). As of 2012, the school is officially named the "Smolny Institute, Russian Academy of Education." It is located outside the immediate city centre.
