= Isaak Brodsky =

Soviet painter

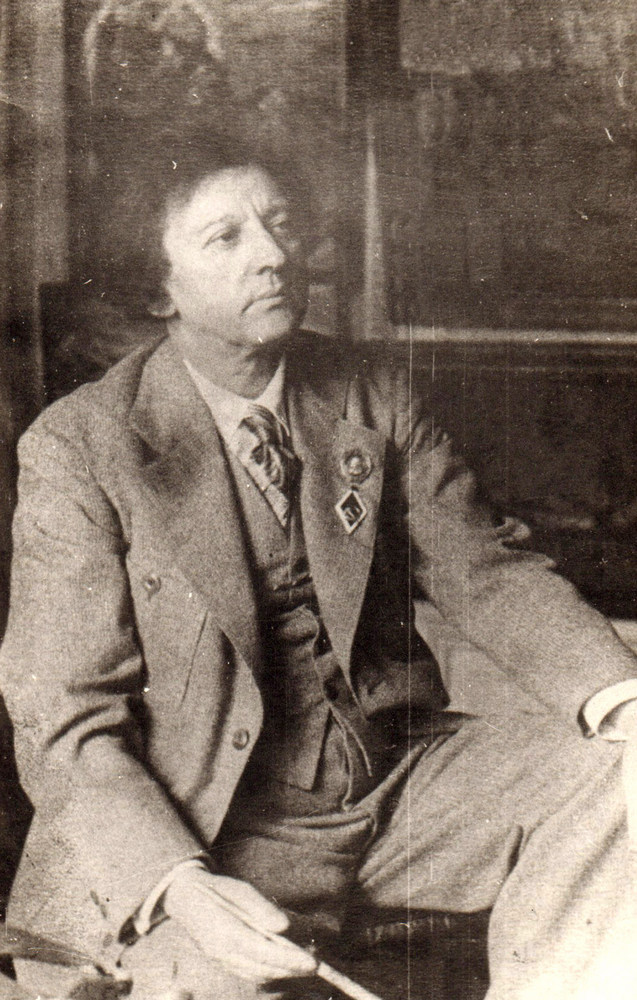
- Born: Isaak Izrailevich Brodsky; 6 January 1884 [O.S. 25 December 1883] Sofiyivka, Taurida Governorate, Russian Empire
- Died: 14 August 1939 (aged 55); Leningrad, RSFSR, USSR
- Resting place: Literatorskiye Mostki, Saint Petersburg
- Education: Odesa Art Academy; Imperial Academy of Arts
- Known for: Painting
- Movement: Socialist realism
- Children: Two, including Lidiya
- Relatives: Fyodor Reshetnikov (son-in-law)
- Awards: Order of Lenin; Honoured Worker of the Arts Industry of the RSFSR

External image
- Aleksandr Laktionov, Isaak Brodsky, signed and dated 1938, oils; Russian Museum

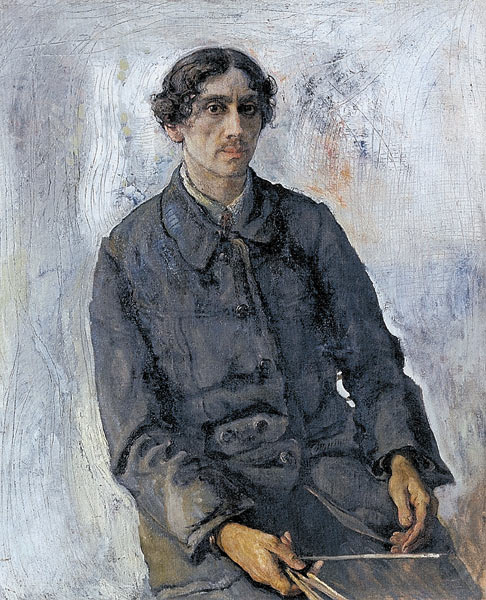
Self-portrait

Isaak Izrailevich Brodsky (Russian: Исаа́к Изра́илевич Бро́дский, Ukrainian: Іса́к Ізраїльович Бро́дський; 6 January 1884 [O.S. 25 December 1883] – 14 August 1939) was a Russian painter and draughtsman of Jewish descent, active in St. Petersburg (later Leningrad) during the Silver Age and early Soviet era, best known for his portrayals of Vladimir Lenin and other Soviet leaders, renowned as blueprint examples of the socialist realist style.

== Life and career ==
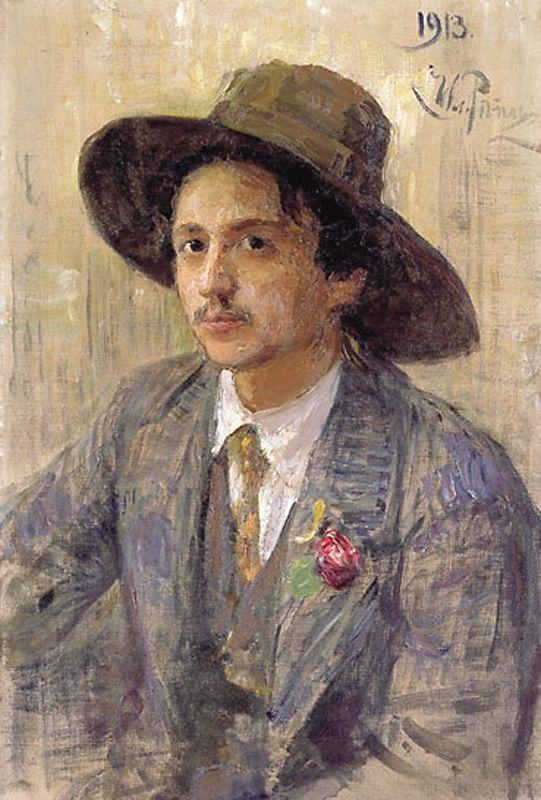
Portrait of Brodsky by Ilya Repin, 1913

Brodsky was born in the village of Sofiyivka near Berdiansk in modern-day Ukraine. His father Yisrael was a Jewish merchant. He studied at Odesa Art Academy and the Imperial Academy of Arts in Saint Petersburg. For five years he studied at the Academy under Ilya Repin. In 1916, he joined the Jewish Society for the Encouragement of the Arts. When Brodsky asked Lenin to autograph his painting Lenin, he said: "I am signing to what I don't agree with for the first time".

Brodsky was on good terms with many leading Russian painters, including his mentor, Ilya Repin. He was an avid art collector who donated numerous first-class paintings to museums in his native Ukraine and elsewhere. His art collection included important works by Repin, Vasily Surikov, Valentin Serov, Isaak Levitan, Mikhail Vrubel, and Boris Kustodiev.

Brodsky was an Honoured Worker of the Arts Industry of the RSFSR and a member of the Union of Russian Artists. He was the first painter to be awarded the Order of Lenin. In 1934, he was appointed Director of the All-Russian Academy of Arts. From 1934 to 1939, he was also a head of personal Art workshop in institute, where his pupils included the well-known Soviet painters: Nikolai Timkov, Aleksandr Laktionov, Yuri Neprintsev, Piotr Belousov, Piotr Vasiliev, Mikhail Kozell and others.

== Legacy ==
He died in Leningrad in 1939. His memoirs were published posthumously. After his death, Brodsky's apartment in on Arts Square in St. Petersburg was declared a national museum. His art collection is still on exhibit there.

Odesa Fine Arts Museum bore Brodsky's name in 1938-1941.

The Berdyansk Art Museum, founded by Brodsky in 1930, bears Brodsky's name, where the artist gave about 200 paintings by Russian artists from his collection.

== Gallery ==
Portrait paintings

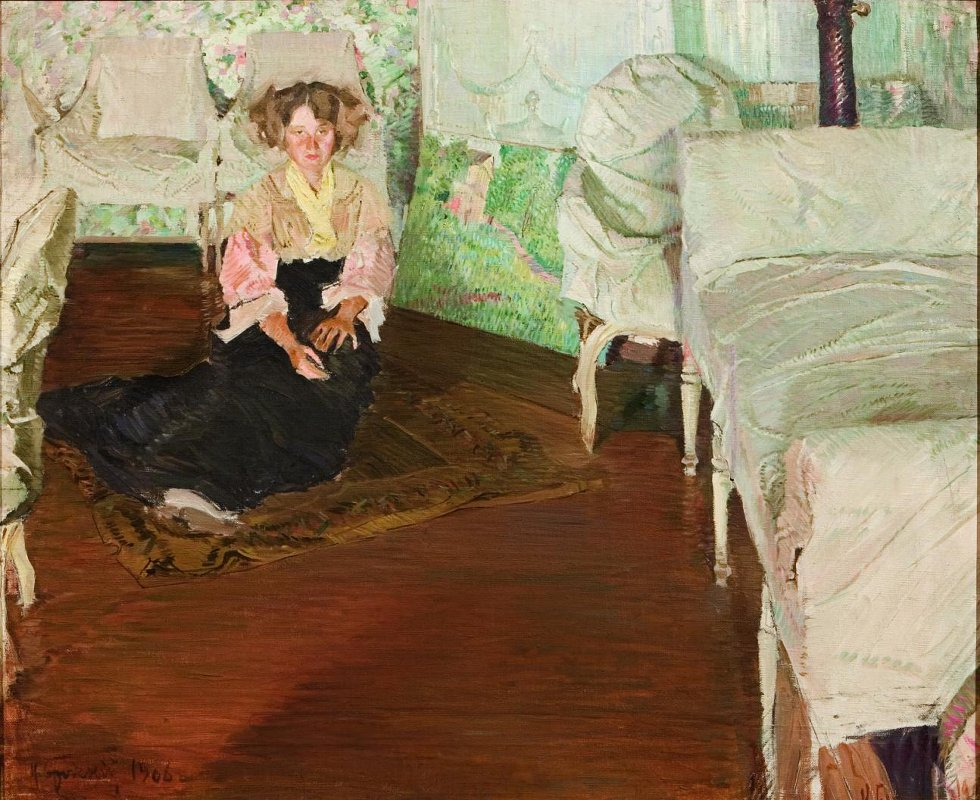
Ludmila Burluk, 1906

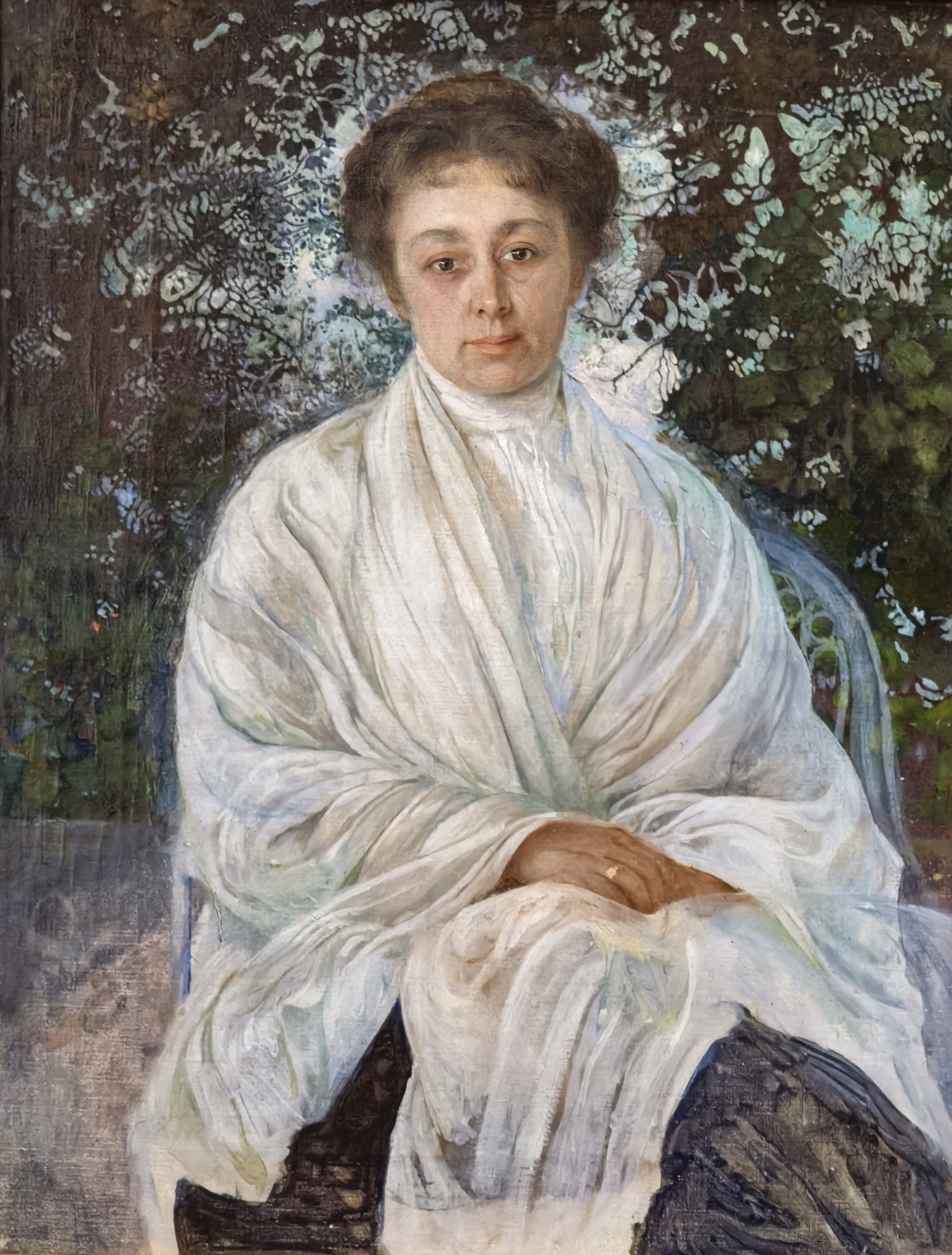
Maria Andreyeva, 1910

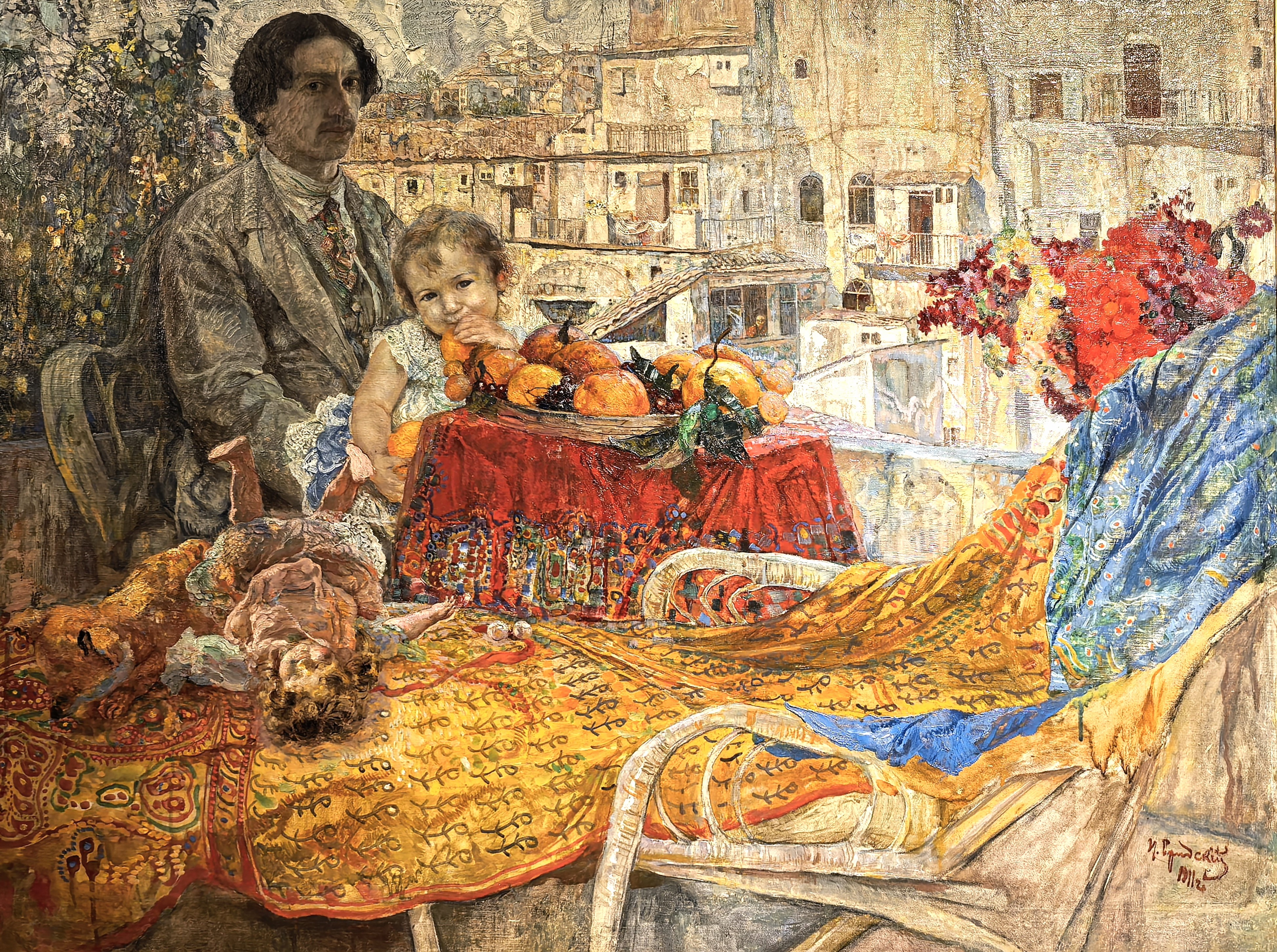
Self-Portrait, featuring the painter's then toddler daughter Lidiya, 1911

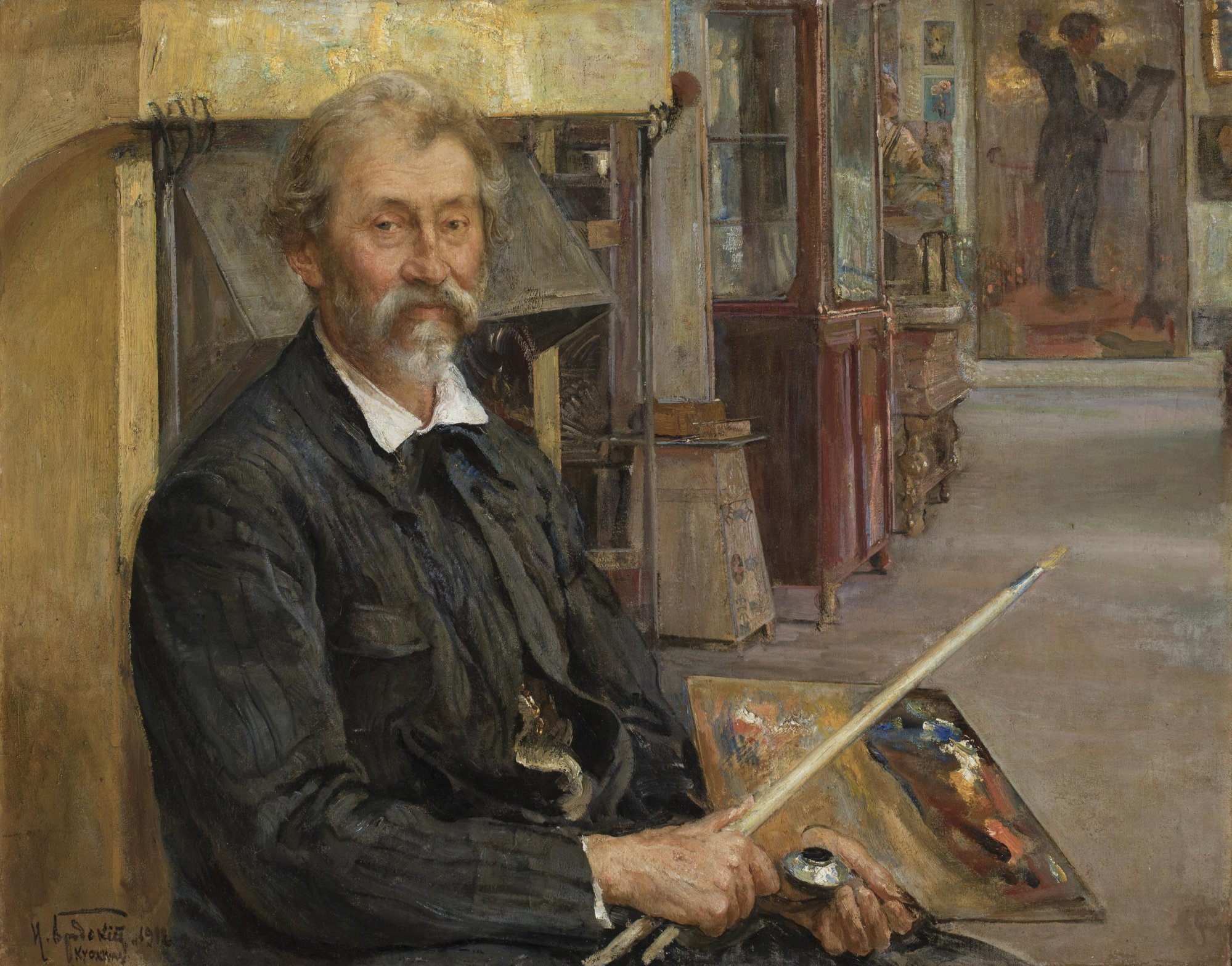
Ilya Repin, 1912

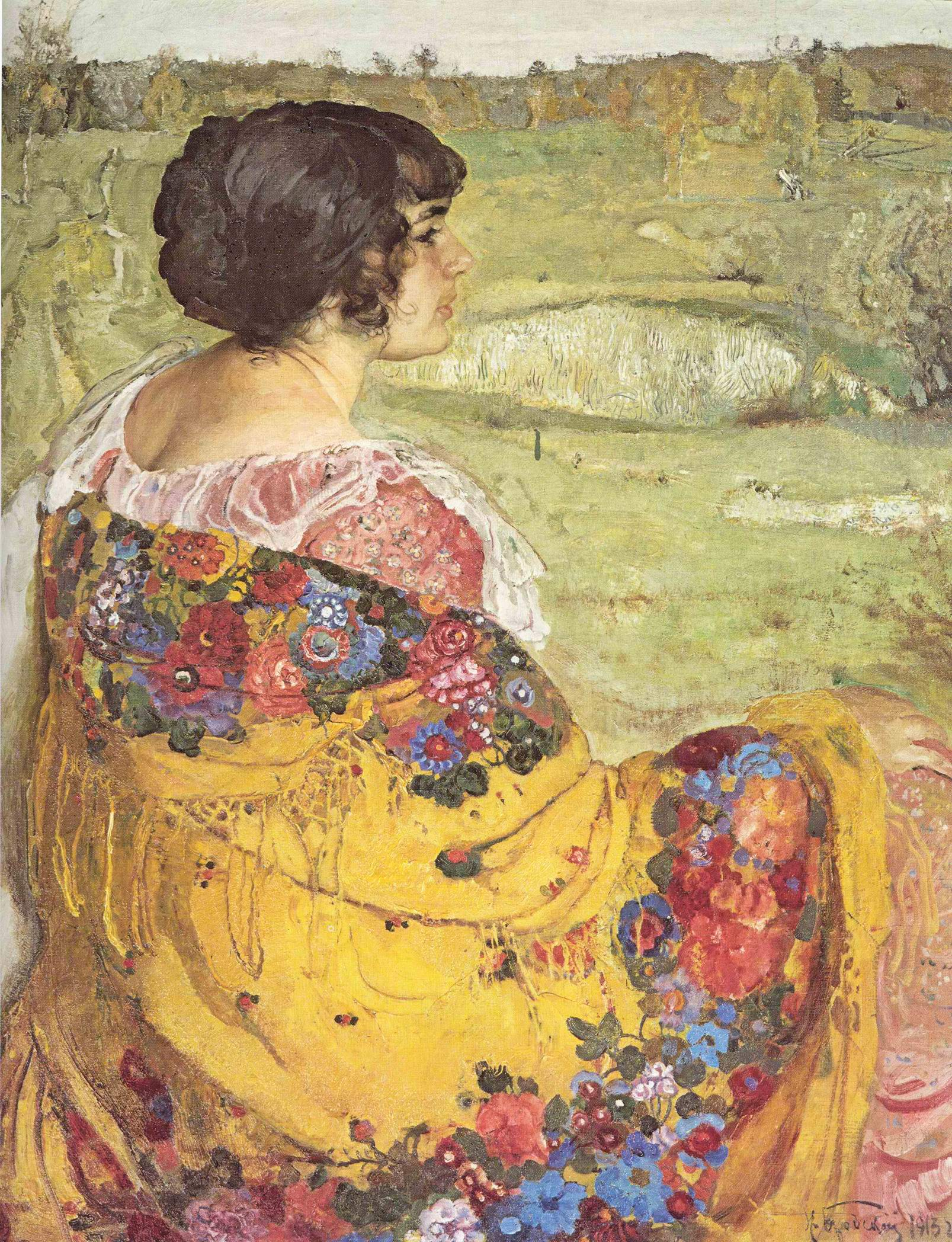
Lubov Makarovna Brodskaya, the painter's first wife, 1913

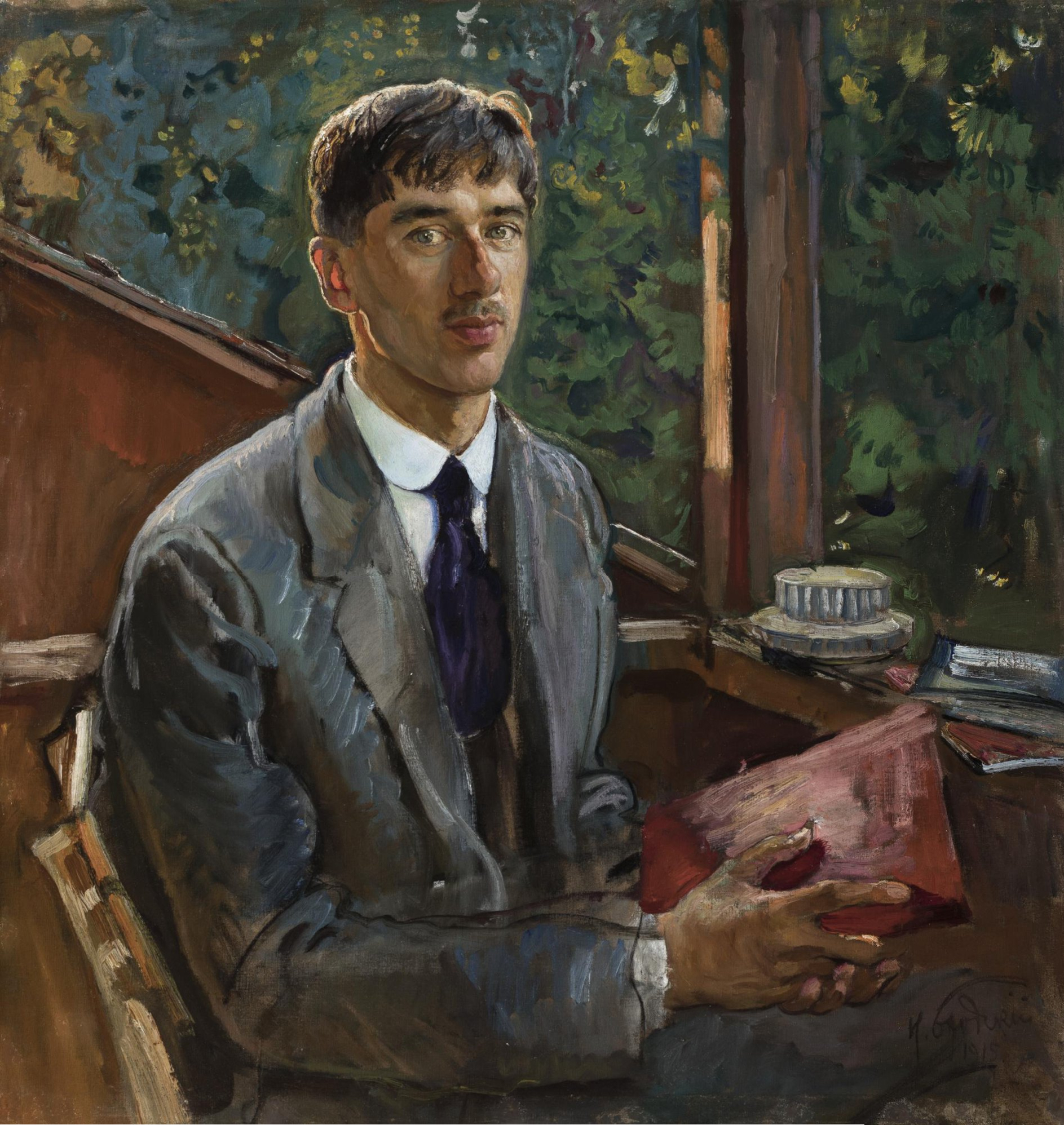
Korney Chukovsky, 1915

Portrait of a Lady, 1916

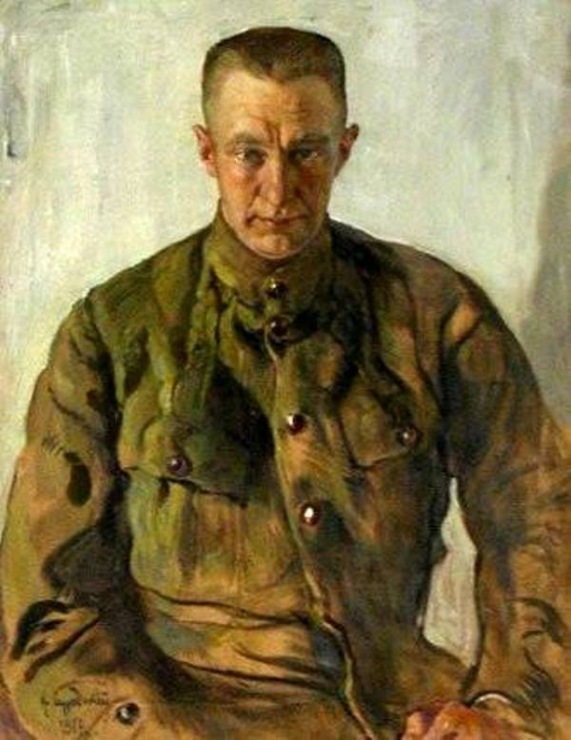
Alexander Kerensky, c. 1917–1918

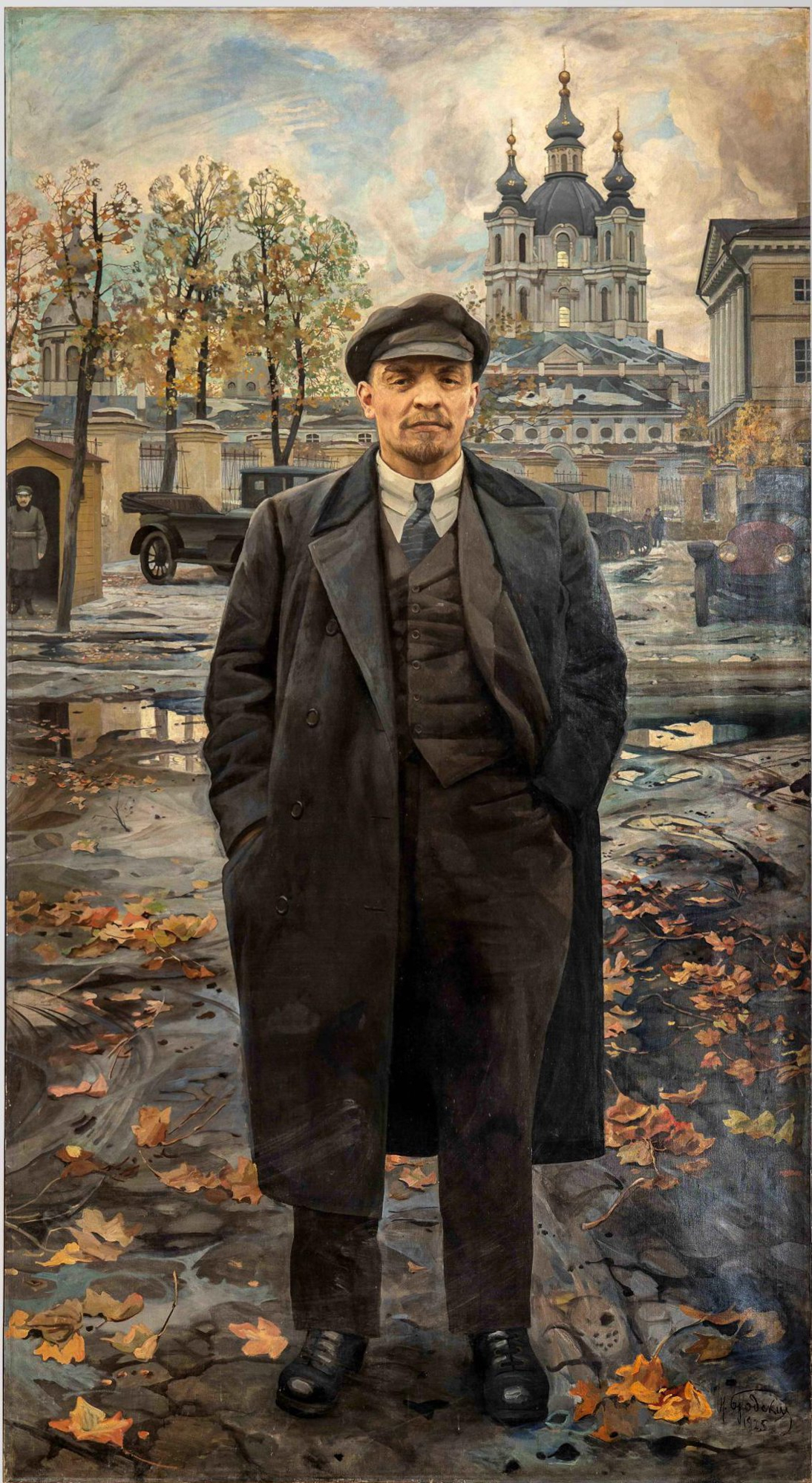
Vladimir Lenin in Front of Smolny, 1925

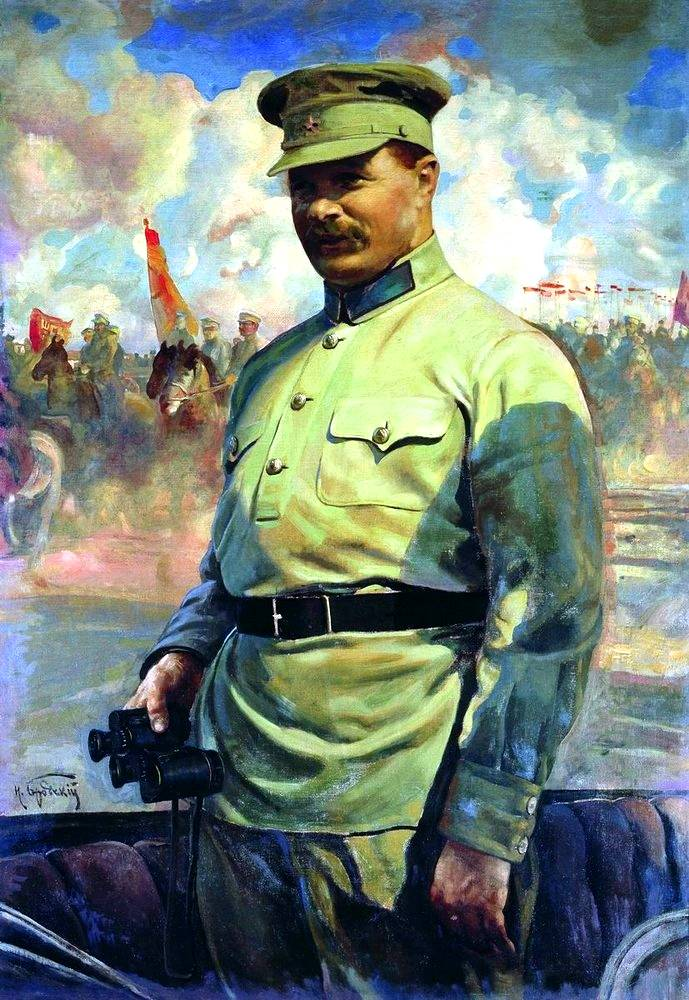
Mikhail Frunze, 1929

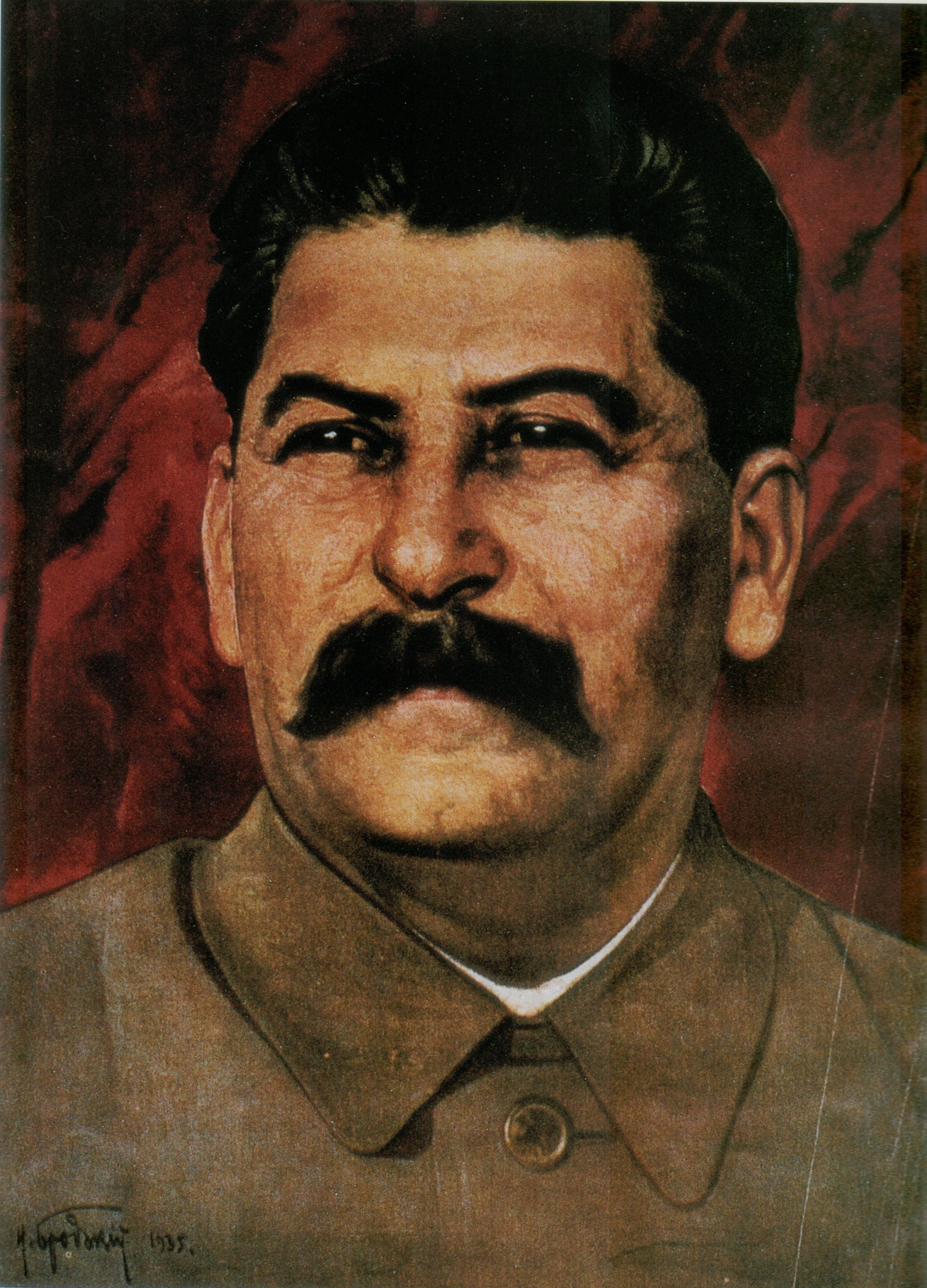
Joseph Stalin, 1935

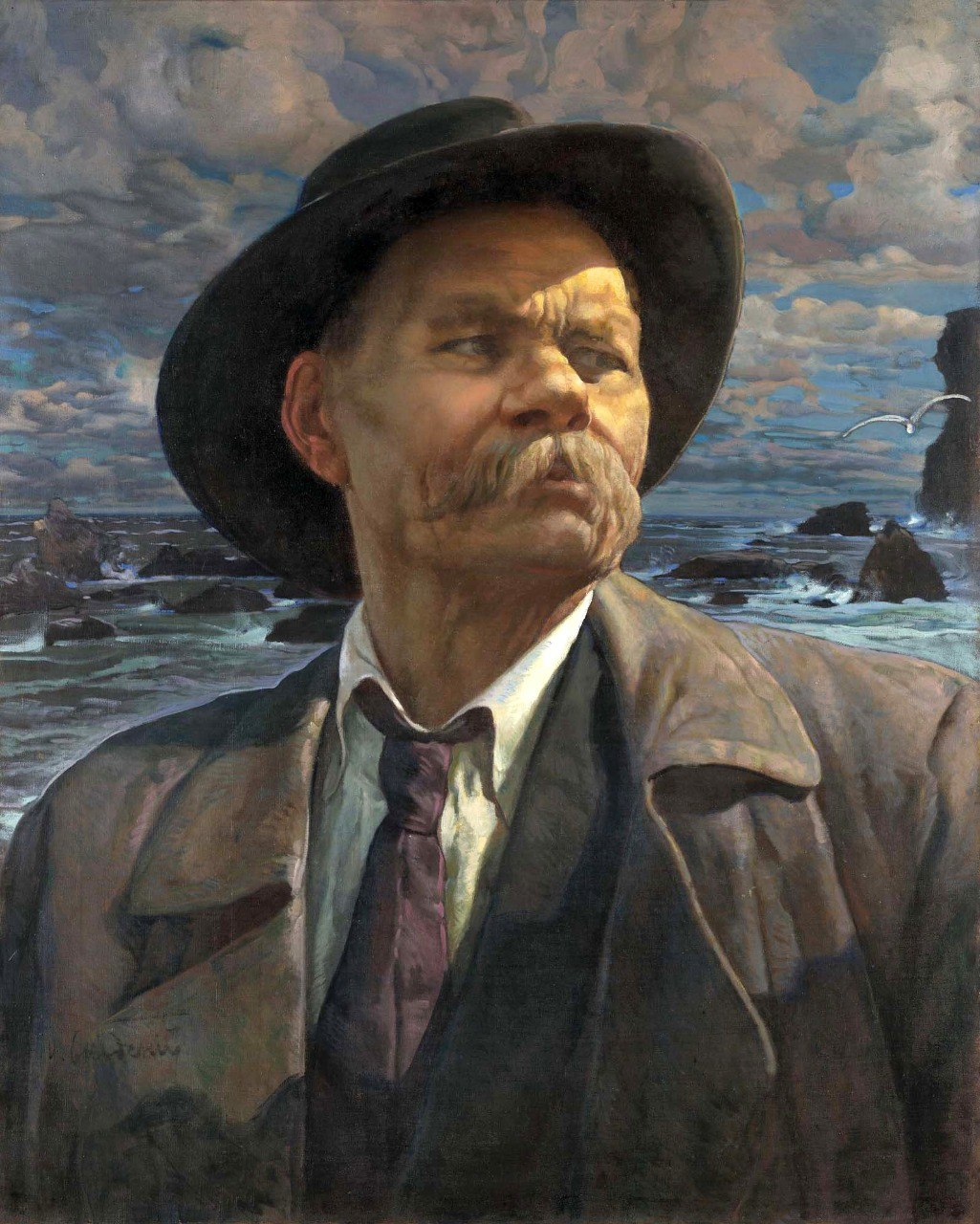
Maxim Gorky, 1937
Narrative paintings

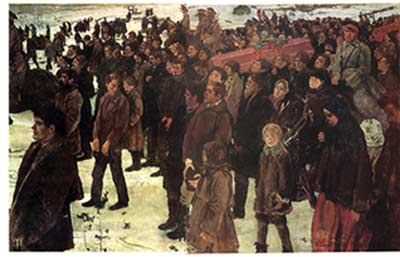
A Worker's Funeral, 1906

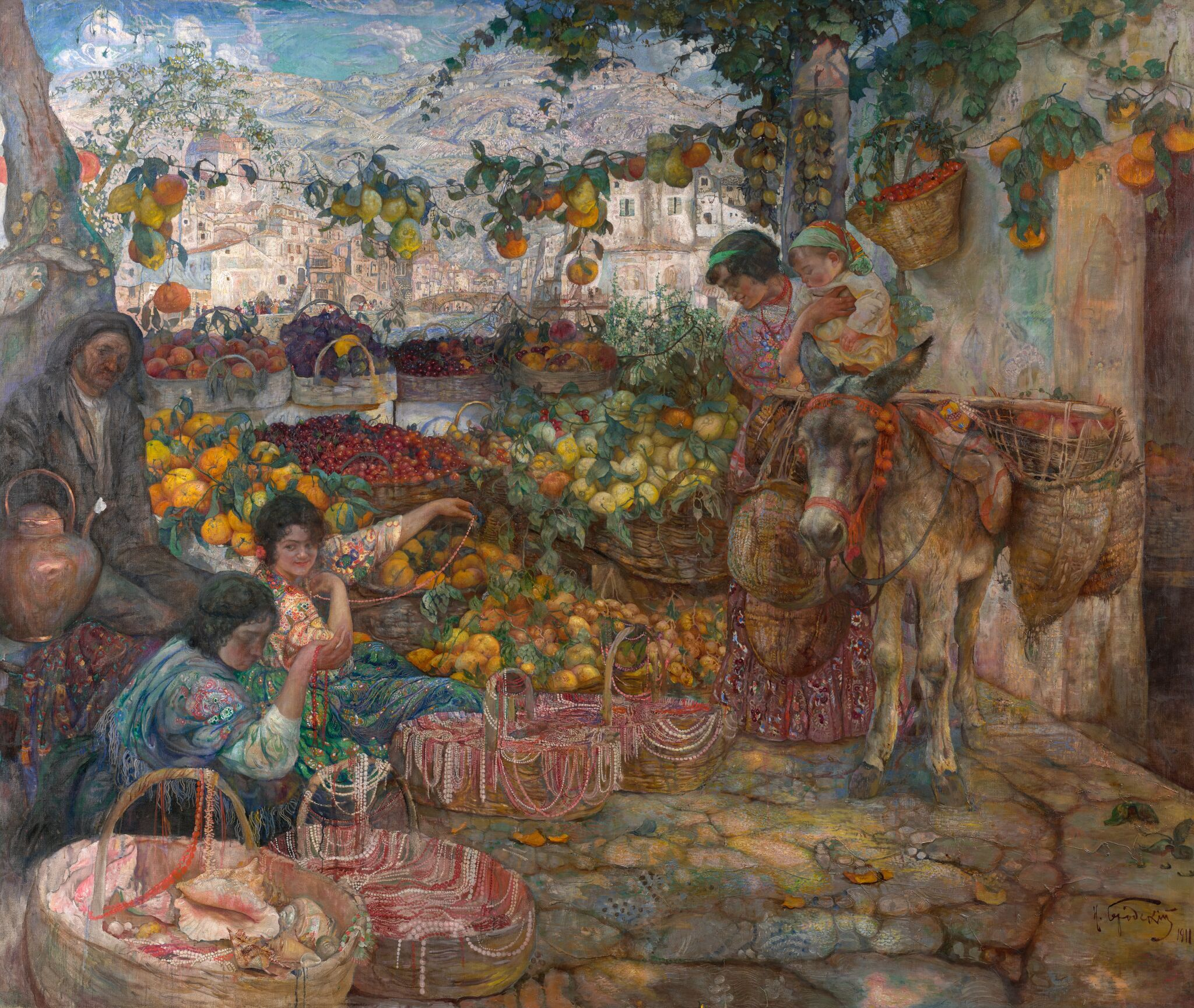
Italy, 1911

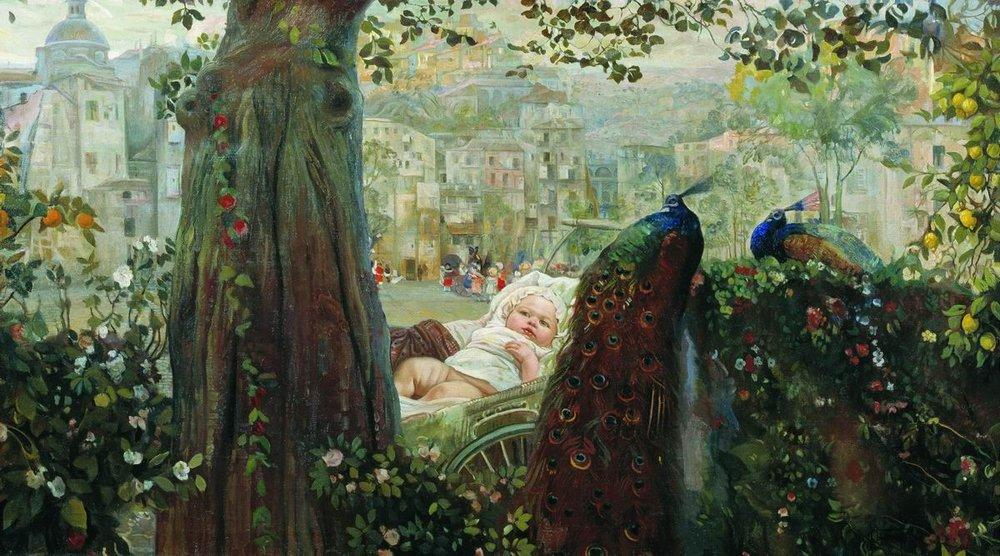
Fairy Tale, 1911

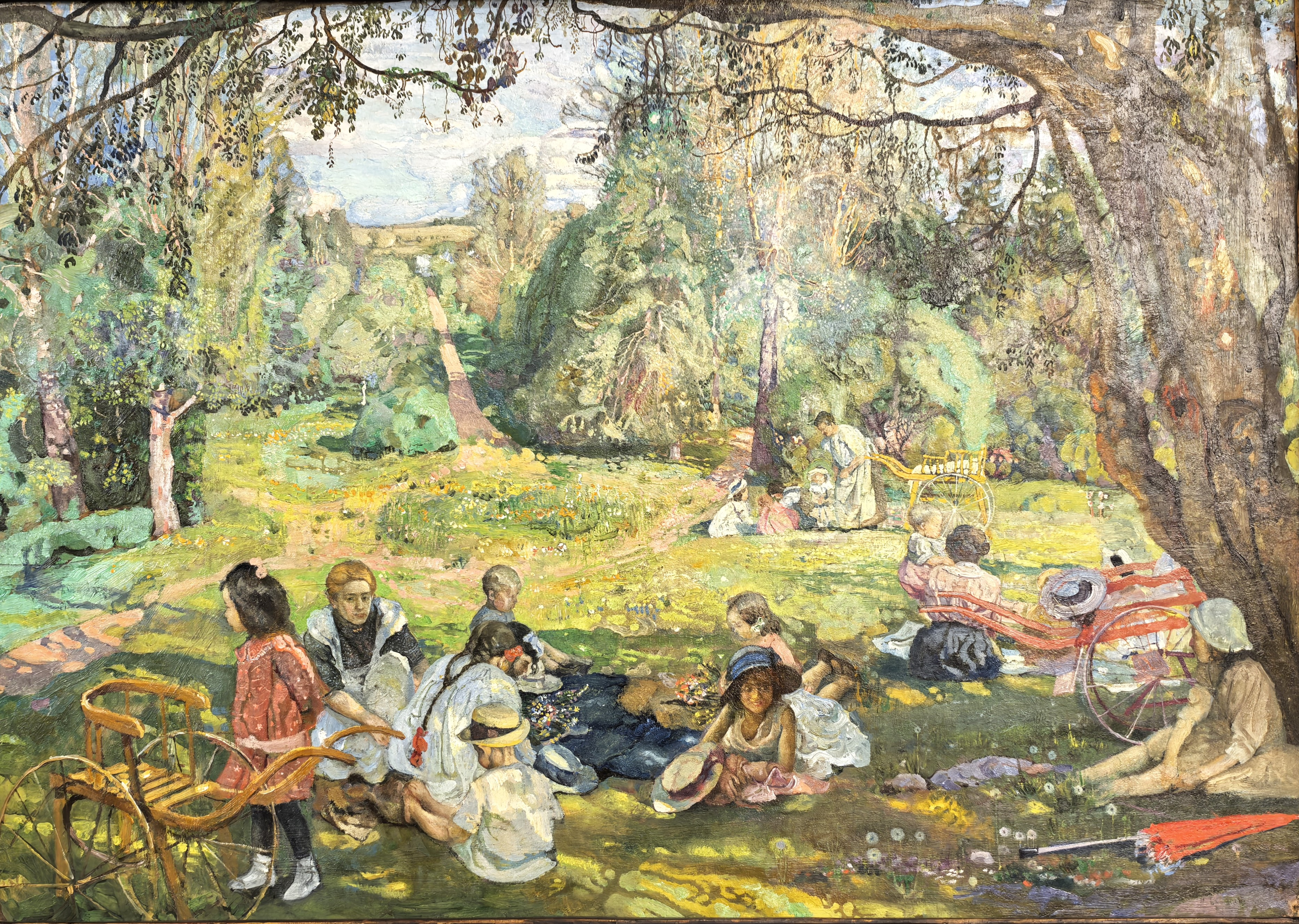
Children on the Lawn, 1913

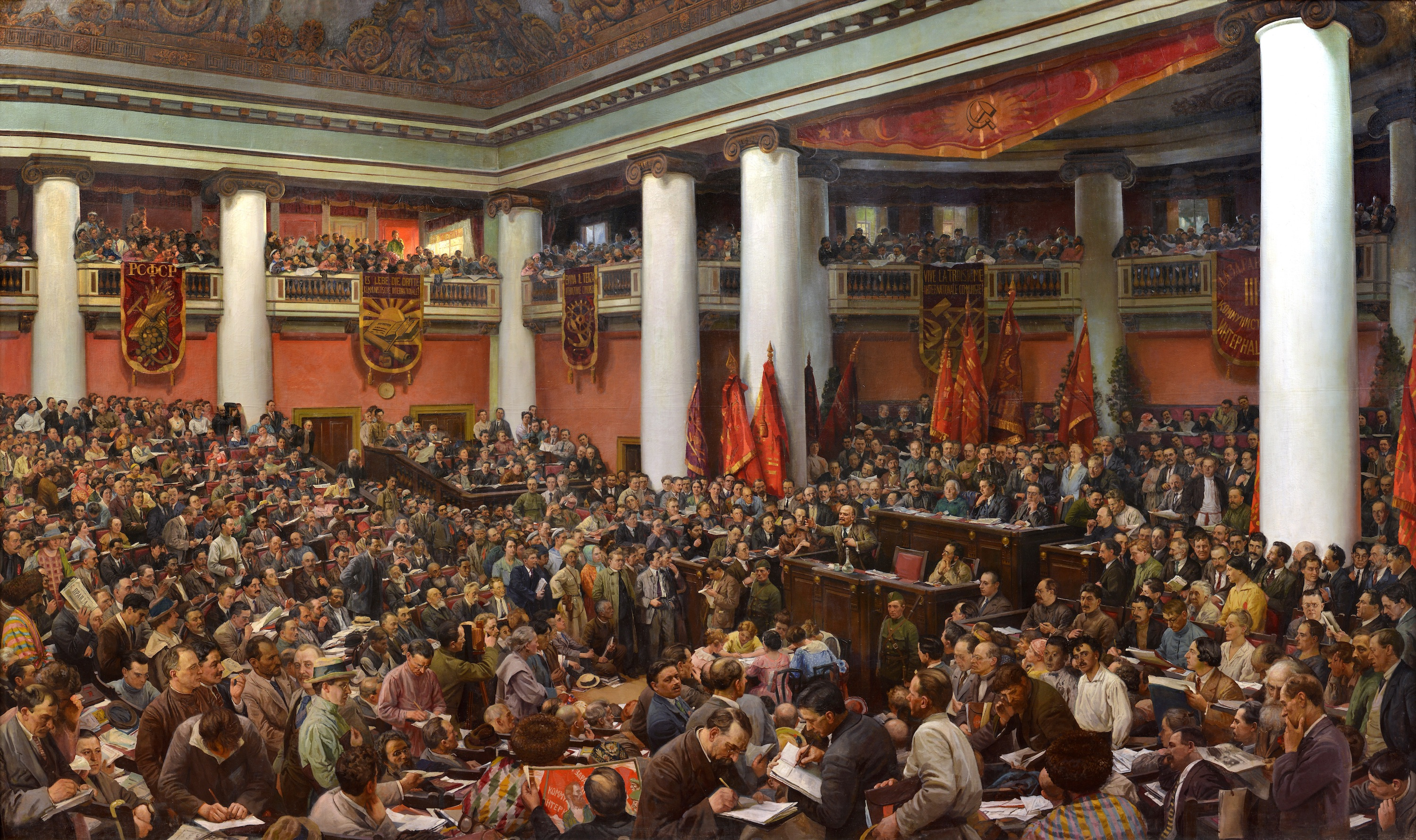
The Opening of the 2nd Congress of the Comintern, 1920–1924

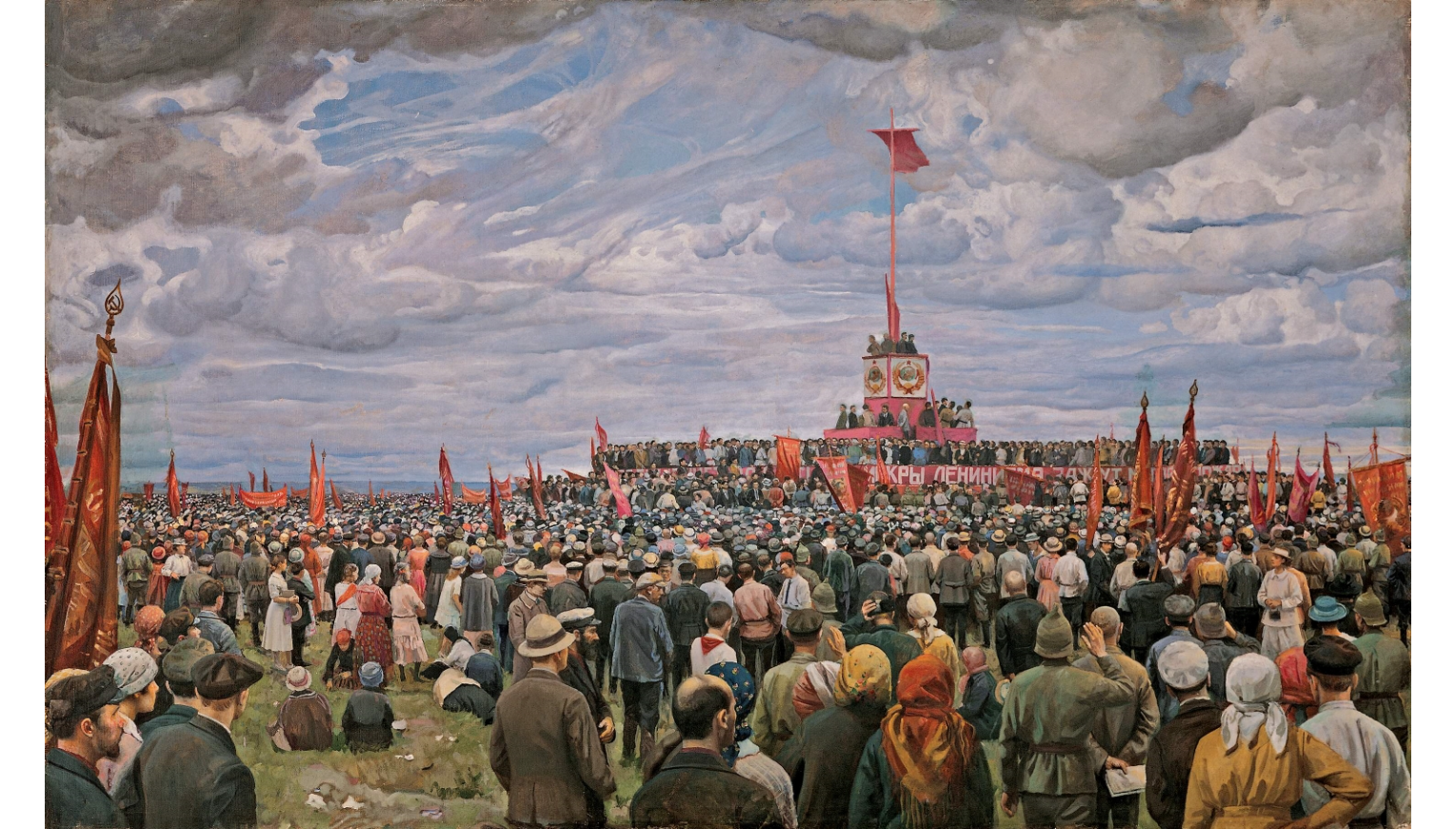
The Passing of the Communards' Banner to the Moscow Workers, c. 1924

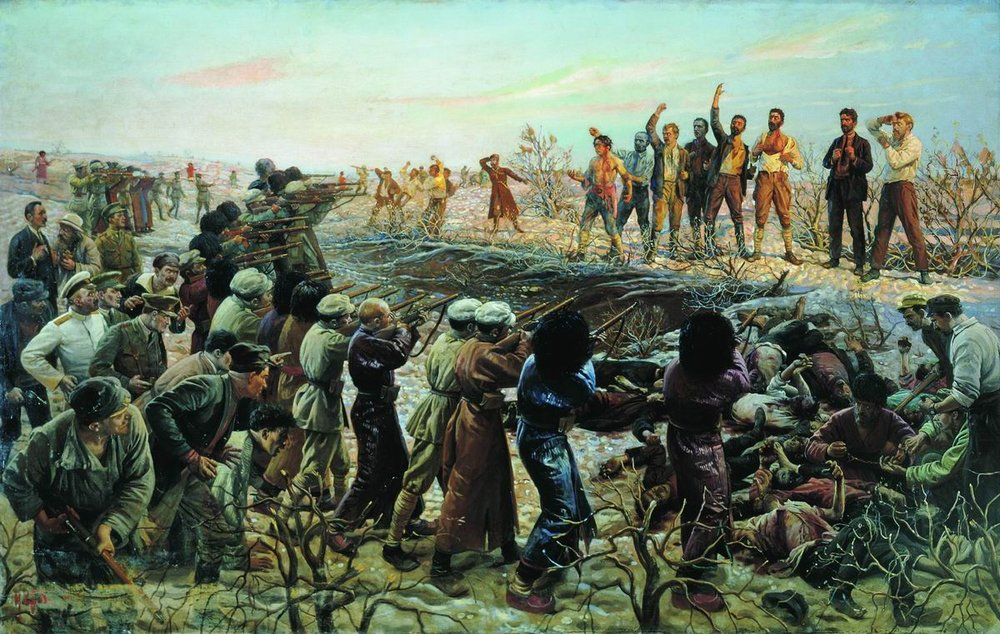
The Execution of the Baku Commissars, 1925

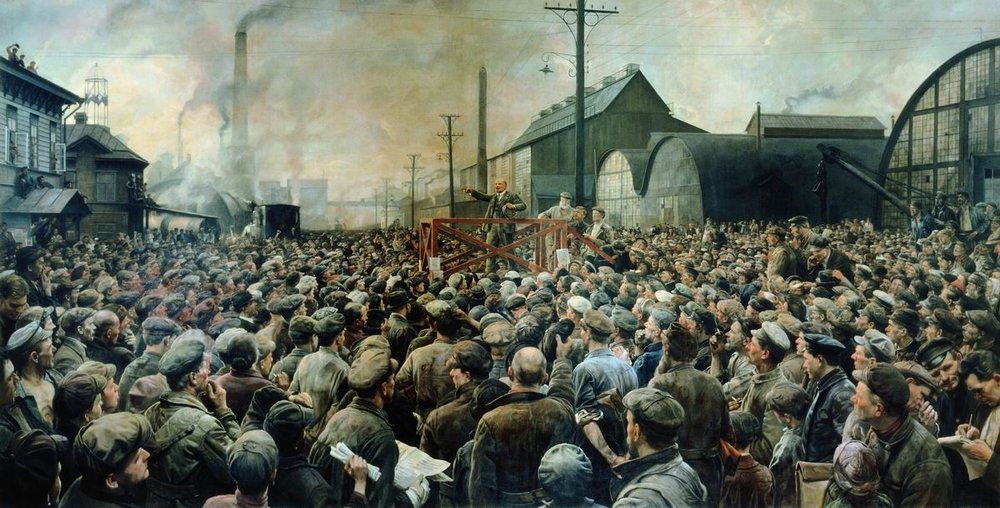
Lenin at the Putilov Factory, May 1917, 1929

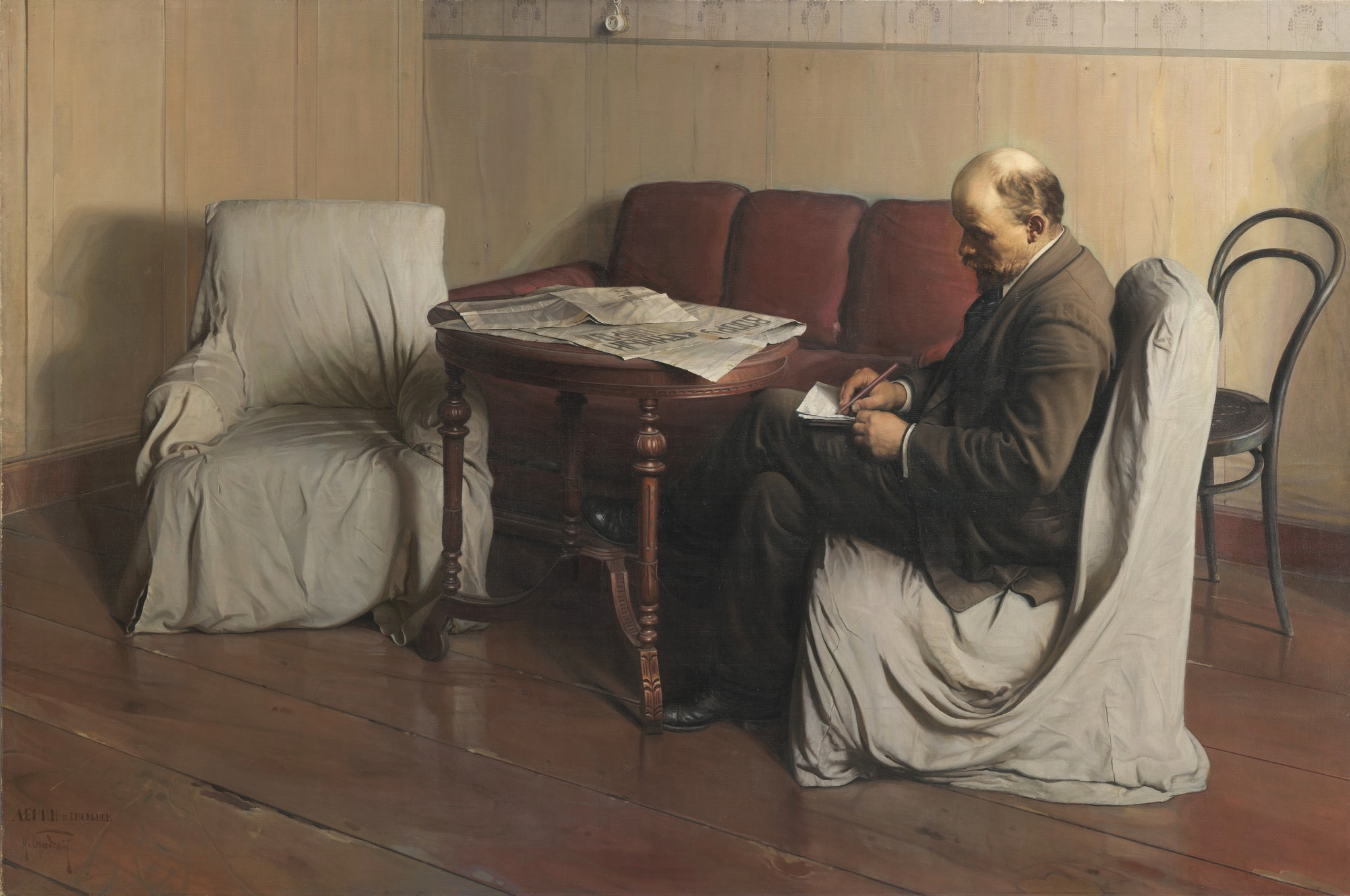
Lenin in Smolny, 1930

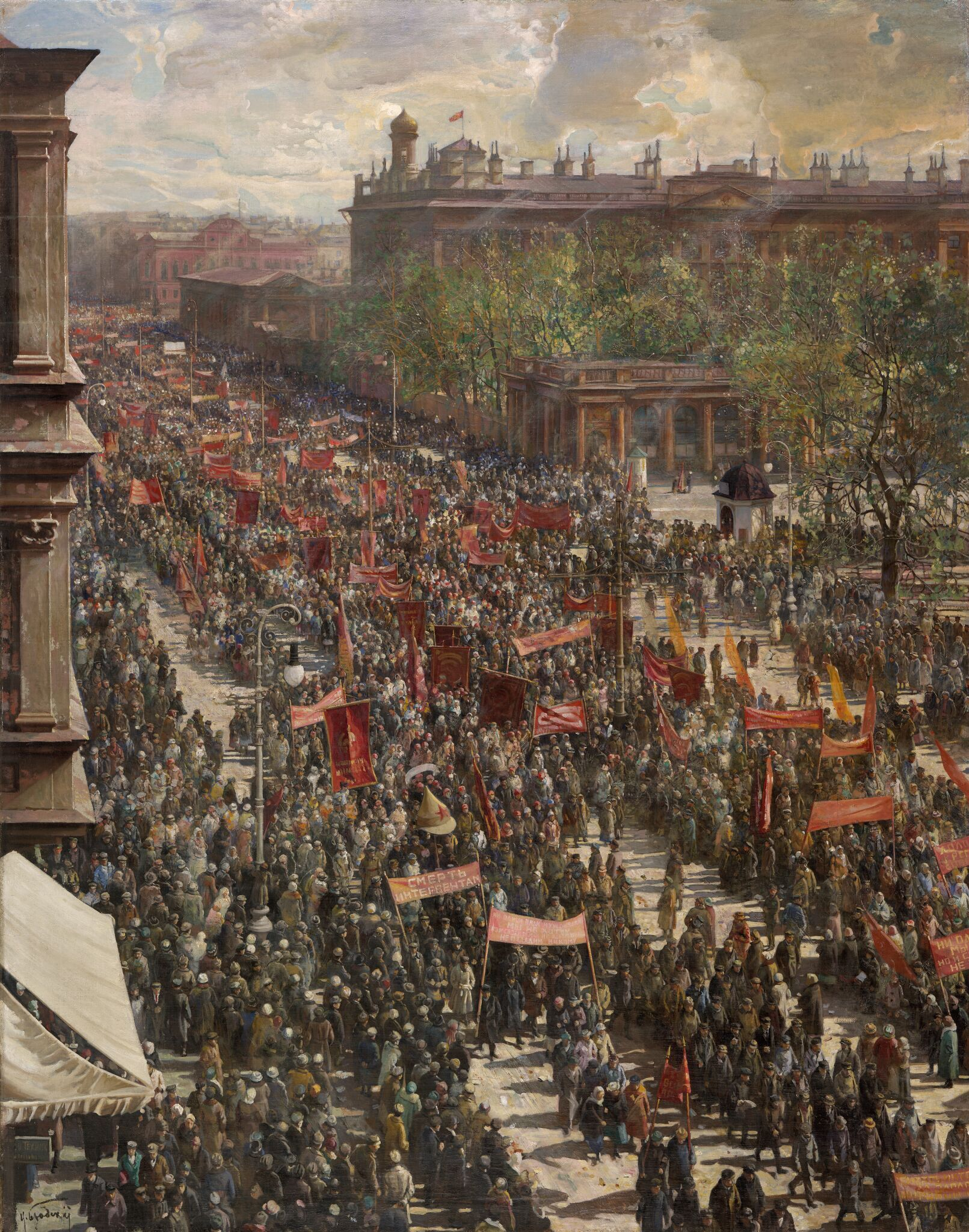
A Demonstration on 25 October Prospect, 1934
Landscape paintings

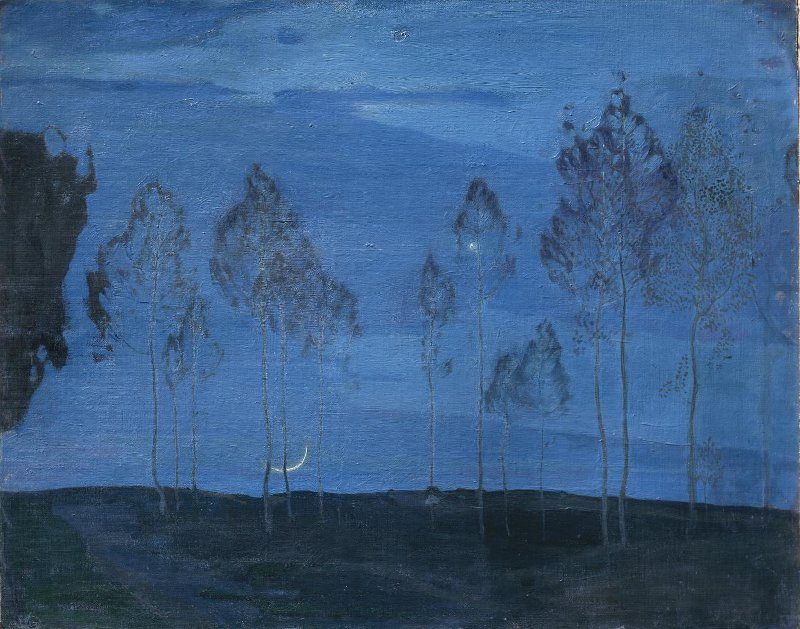
New Moon, 1906

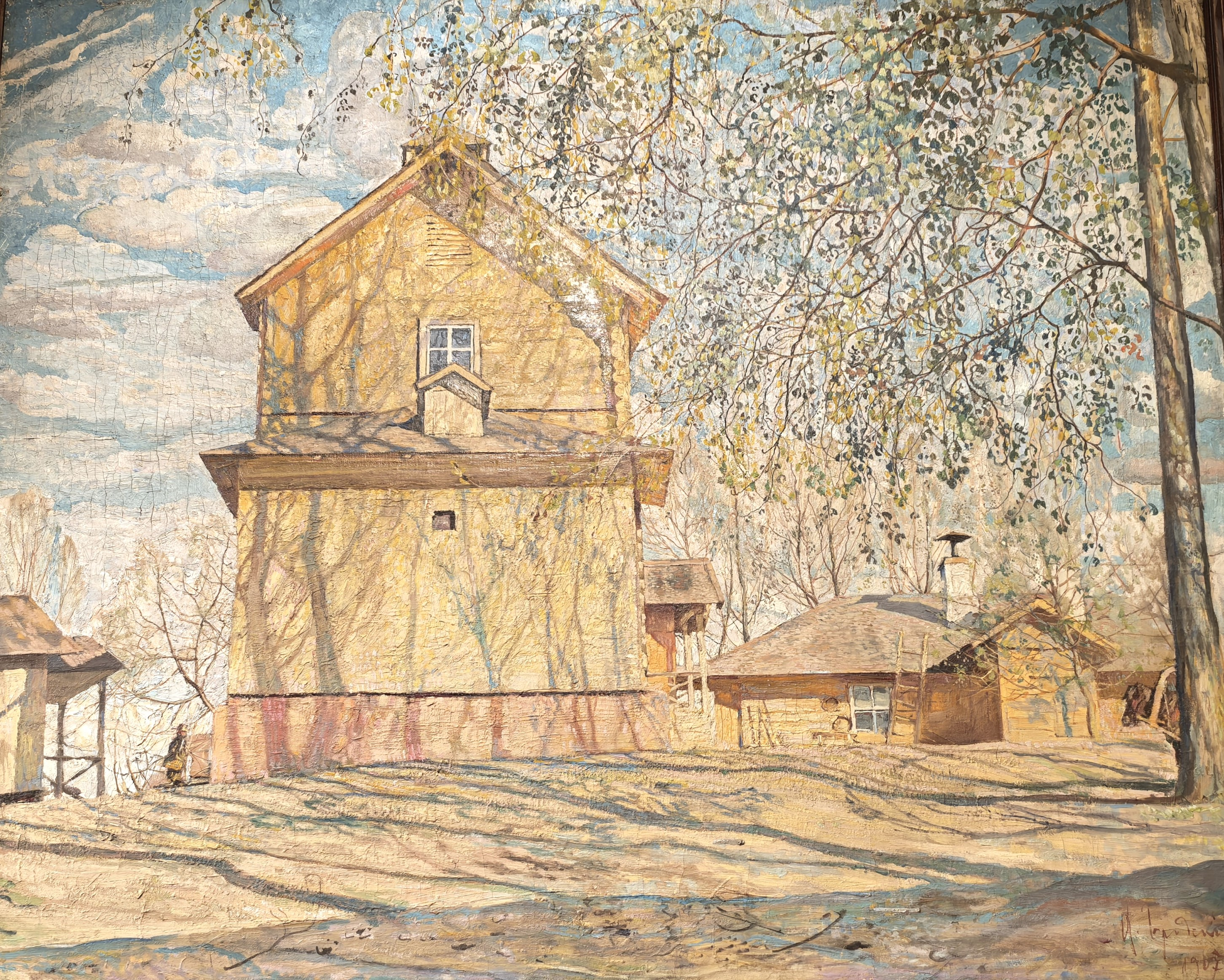
Akademicheskaya Dacha, 1907

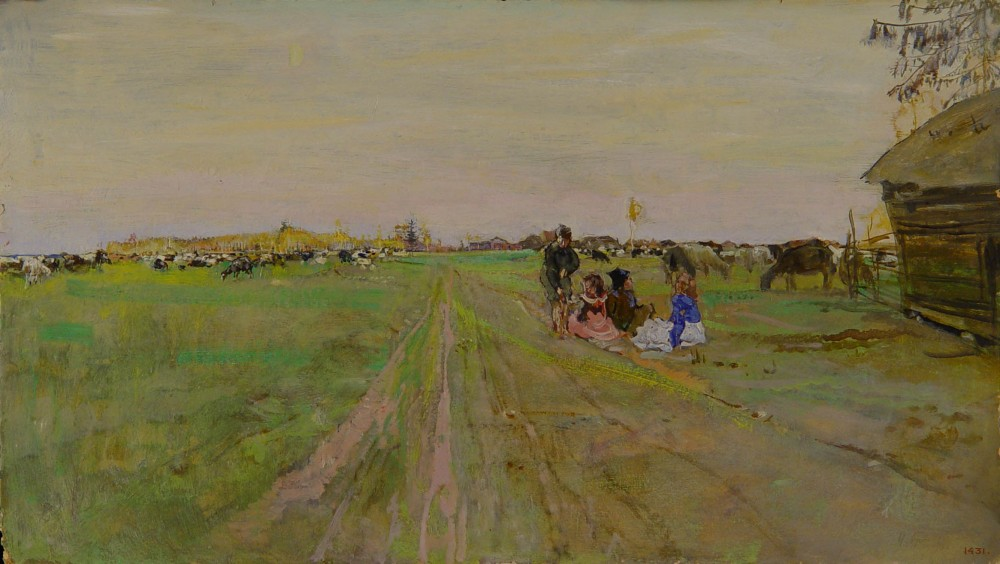
At the Evening, 1911

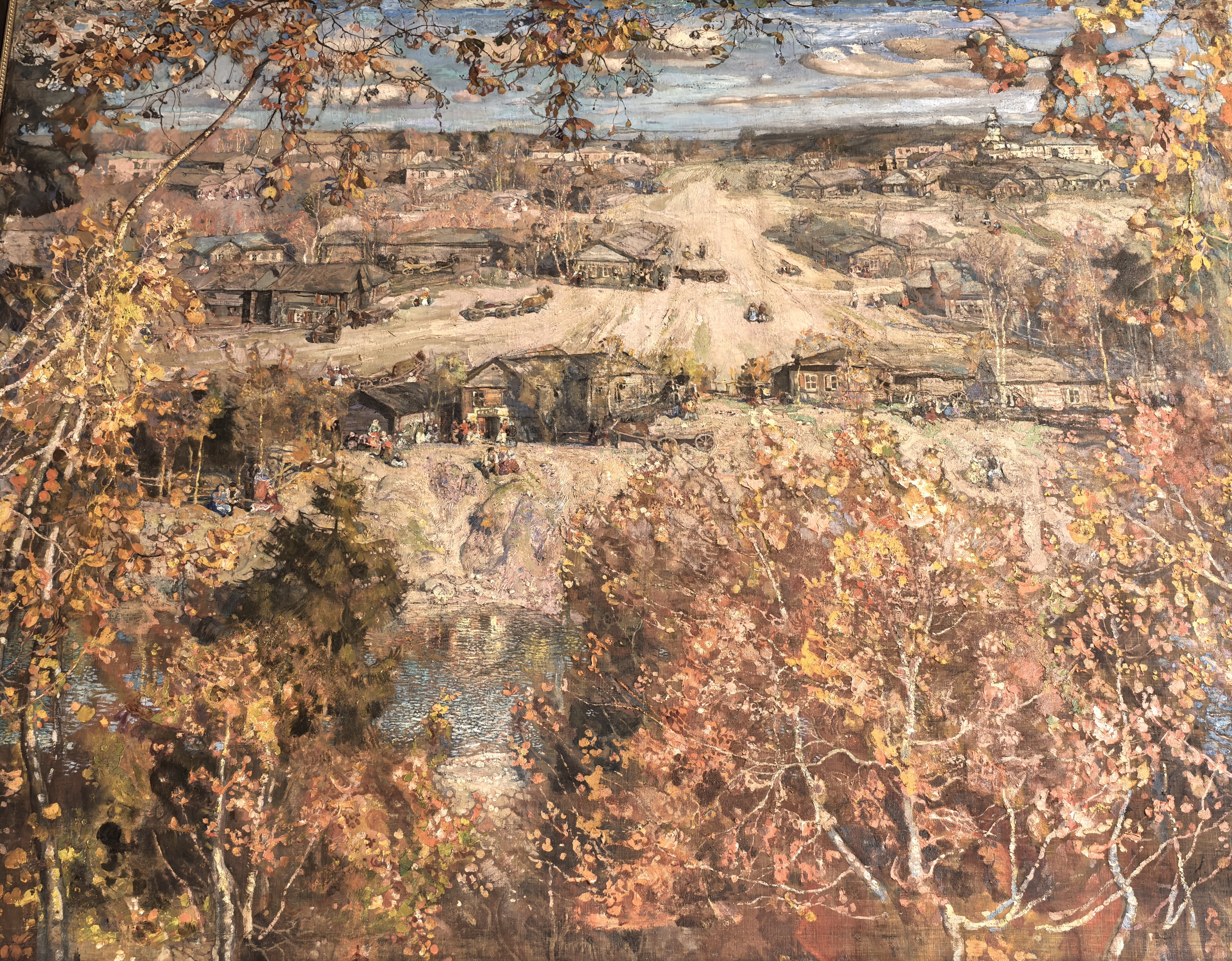
Golden Autumn, 1913

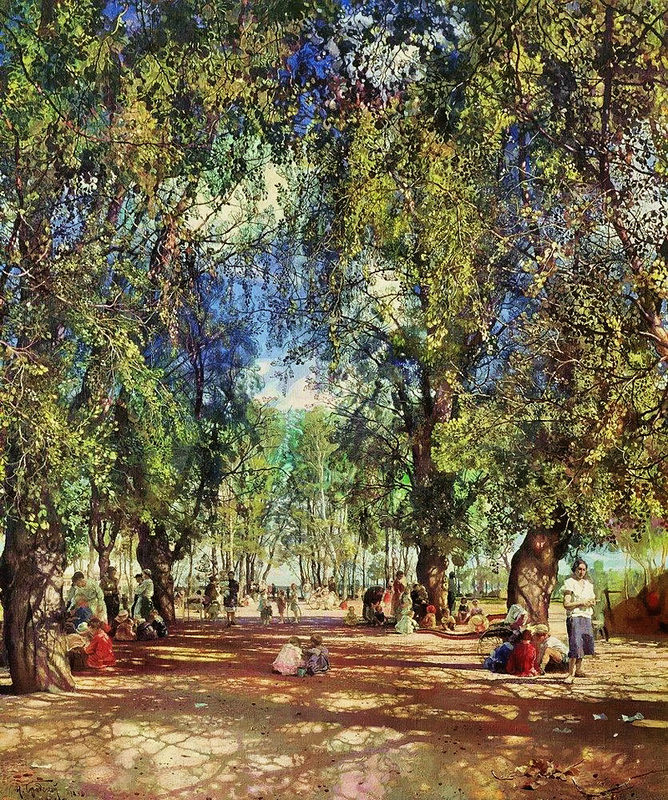
Alley in a Park, 1930

== Publications ==
- Brodsky, Isaak I. (1940). Brodsky, Iosif Anat. (ed.). Мой творческий путь (in Russian). Leningrad, Moscow: Iskusstvo – via the Russian State Library repository.
  - Brodsky, Isaak I. (1965). Brodsky, Iosif Anat. (ed.). Мой творческий путь (in Russian). Leningrad: Khudozhnik RSFSR.
  - Brodsky, Isaak I. (2014). Brodsky, Iosif Anat. (ed.). Мой творческий путь (in Russian). Saint Petersburg: Lenizdat / Komanda-A. ISBN 978-5-4453-0746-4.
- Brodsky, Isaak I.; et al. (1959). Brodsky, Iosif Anat. and Sokolnikov, Mikhail P. [in Russian] (eds.). Памяти И. И. Бродского. Воспоминания. Документы. Письма (in Russian). Leningrad: Khudozhnik RSFSR.
