= In memory of Teacher (Saint Petersburg, 1997) =

1997 Soviet art Exhibition in Saint Petersburg

Nevsky Prospekt
- Artist: Gleb Savinov
- Year: 1984
- Location: private collection; Russia

Retrospective Exhibition "In memory of Teacher. Exhibition of Saint Petersburg artists - students workshop of Alexander Osmerkin" (Russian: Памяти учителя. Выставка петербургских художников - учеников мастерской А. А. Осмеркина) became one of the notable events in the Saint Petersburg exhibition live of 1997 year. The Exhibition took place in Saint Petersburg in the Memorial Museum of Nikolai A. Nekrasov. There were exhibited 44 art works from private collections created by 12 pupils of Alexander Osmerkin. All them graduated Repin Institute of Arts in 1930-1950s.

== History and Organization ==
Exhibition was opened on November 5, and worked up to December 1, 1997. Catalog was published. The curator of exhibition was Nikolai Kononikhyn, collector and art critic.

== Contributing Artists ==
There were exhibited art works of 12 painters - pupils of Alexander Osmerkin, representatives of the Leningrad School: Evgenia Antipova, Evgenia Baykova, Olga Bogaevskaya, Ivan Godlevsky, Vera Lubimova, Evsey Moiseenko, Nina Neratova, Lev Orekhov, Sergei Osipov, Gleb Savinov, Elena Skuin, Victor Teterin, .

== Contributed Artworks ==
For the Exhibition were selected art works created in 1940-1980s. Some of paintings were exhibited before, some paintings were shown in the first time. In general, the exhibition presented creation of famous masters - pupils of Alexander Osmerkin - in all genres of painting of 1940-1980s.

Genre painting was represented of "Paint of Boats" by Ivan Godlevsky, "At the Gulf" by Evsey Moiseenko, "At the country cottage" by Lev Orekhov, Nevsky Prospekt by Gleb Savinov, and some others.

Portrait painting was represented of "Katya" by Olga Bogaevskaya, "Portrait of young woman" by Ivan Godlevsky, "A Boy" by Vera Lubimova, "Natasha in a chaise longue. Gurzuf" by Evsey Moiseenko, "A Boy in a fur hat" by Nina Neratova, and some others.

Landscape painting was represented of "Romantic landscape", "Flowering Almond. A Pathway" by Evgenia Antipova, "Red House. Early Snow" by Ivan Godlevsky, "Courtyard under snow", "Landscape with a fortress. Ancient Izborsk" by Sergei Osipov, "Pristannoe village. Towards evening", "Landscape with herd", "Shore of the Volkhov River" by Gleb Savinov, "A Spring. View on the Smolenka River" by Victor Teterin, and some others.

Still life painting was represented of "Poppies on a brown background" by Evgenia Antipova, "Still life with newspapers and mandolin", "Groupers" by Olga Bogaevskaya, "Still Life with Oranges" by Evsey Moiseenko, "Flowers on the window" by Lev Orekhov, "Still Life with Jug" by Sergei Osipov, "Still life on the Terrace" by Elena Skuin, "Quince and Teapot" by Victor Teterin, and some others.

== Acknowledgment ==
Exhibition was covered in press and in literature specialized at Soviet fine art.

== See also ==
- Soviet art
- Fine Art of Leningrad
- Leningrad School of Painting
- Saint Petersburg Union of Artists
- Socialist realism

== Sources ==
- Памяти учителя. Выставка петербургских художников — учеников мастерской А. А. Осмеркина. Каталог. СПб., Мемориальный музей Н. А. Некрасова, 1997.
- Кононихин Н. Петербургские ученики "Бубнового валета" // Питерbook плюс, 1997. №6. С.27.
- Саблин В. Восторгался и учил восторгу // Вести, №136 (954), 2 декабря 1997. C.4.
- Кононихин Н. Памяти учителя // Пятница, 21 ноября 1997. C.13.
- Справочник членов Ленинградской организации Союза художников РСФСР. Л., Художник РСФСР, 1987.
- Художники народов СССР. Биобиблиографический словарь. Т.1-4. М., Искусство, 1970-1995.
- Sergei V. Ivanov. Unknown Socialist Realism. The Leningrad School. Saint Petersburg: NP-Print Edition, 2007. P.405, 423. ISBN 5-901724-21-6, ISBN 978-5-901724-21-7
- Юбилейный справочник выпускников Санкт-Петербургского академического института живописи, скульптуры и архитектуры имени И. Е. Репина Российской Академии художеств. 1915—2005. СПб., Первоцвет, 2007.
