= Autumn exhibition (Leningrad, 1962) =

1962 Soviet art exhibition

Autumn Exhibition of Leningrad artists of 1962. Catalog
- Year: 1962
- Location: State Russian Museum, Leningrad

Autumn Exhibition of Leningrad artists of 1962 (Russian: Осенняя выставка произведений ленинградских художников 1962 года) opened in State Russian Museum become one of the largest Art Exhibition of 1962 in the USSR.

== History and Organization ==
For the organization and preparation of Exhibition was formed specially Exhibition Committee which consisted of 25 the most authoritative art-experts. Exhibition Catalog was published. In total, the Exhibition displayed almost 600 works of art of painters, sculptors, graphics, artists of theater and cinema, masters of arts and crafts. At whole Exhibition attended over 350 artists of the Leningrad.

== Contributing Artists ==
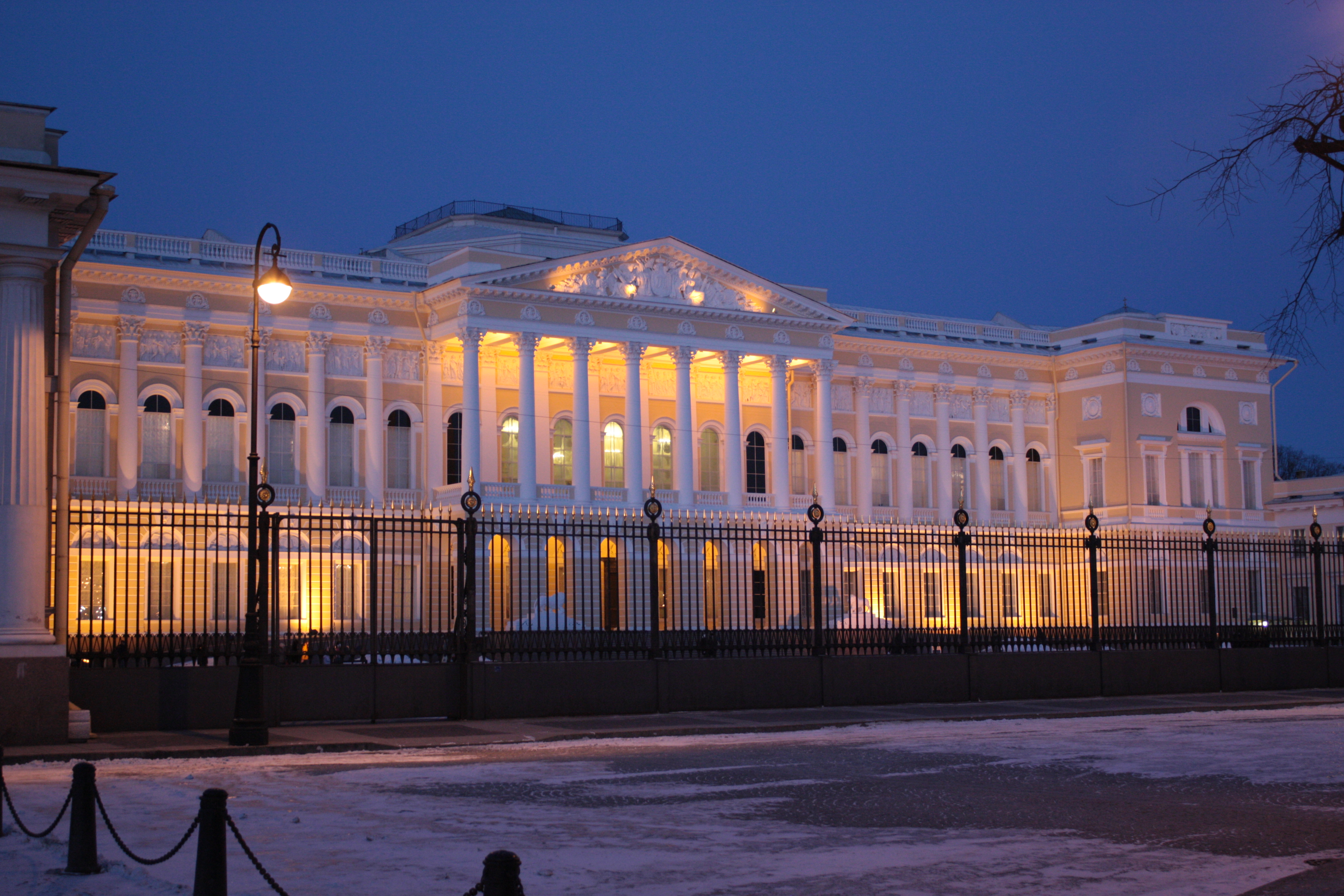
State Russian Museum

In the largest Department of Painting were exhibited art works of 177 authors. There were Piotr Alberti, Evgenia Antipova, Taisia Afonina, Sergei Babkov, Irina Baldina, Nikolai Baskakov, Vsevolod Bazhenov, Yuri Belov, Dmitry Belyaev, Olga Bogaevskaya, Nikolai Galakhov, Ivan Godlevsky, Vladimir Gorb, Abram Grushko, Alexei Eremin, Mikhail Kaneev, Maria Kleschar-Samokhvalova, Maya Kopitseva, Boris Korneev, Alexander Koroviakov, Victor Korovin, Elena Kostenko, Gevork Kotiantz, Mikhail Kozell, Engels Kozlov, Marina Kozlovskaya, Yaroslav Krestovsky, Valeria Larina, Boris Lavrenko, Ivan Lavsky, Anatoli Levitin, Oleg Lomakin, Gavriil Malish, Boris Maluev, Evsey Moiseenko, Nikolai Mukho, Piotr Nazarov, Vera Nazina, Mikhail Natarevich, Yaroslav Nikolaev, Dmitry Oboznenko, Lev Orekhov, Lia Ostrova, Vladimir Ovchinnikov, Sergei Osipov, Genrikh Pavlovsky, Varlen Pen, Nikolai Pozdneev, Stepan Privedentsev, Semion Rotnitsky, Galina Rumiantseva, Ivan Savenko, Gleb Savinov, Alexander Semionov, Arseny Semionov, Nadezhda Shteinmiller, Elena Skuin, Kim Slavin, Alexander Sokolov, Alexander Stolbov, Alexander Tatarenko, Victor Teterin, Nikolai Timkov, Mikhail Trufanov, Yuri Tulin, Boris Ugarov, Ivan Varichev, Anatoli Vasiliev, Valery Vatenin, Rostislav Vovkushevsky, Vecheslav Zagonek, Elena Zhukova, and others most prominent painters of the Leningrad School.

In the Department of Sculptures were exhibited art works of 41 sculptors. Department of graphics presented a creation of 86 artists.

== Contributed Artworks ==
For the Exhibition were selected art works created in 1961-1962, also some earlier works. All they were exhibited in the first time. Some of them were subsequently found in the collections of Soviet Art museums, as well as domestic and foreign galleries and collectors.

Portrait was presented of "Portrait of playwriter Alexander Volodin" by Nikolay Akimov, "Astronaut Gherman Titov" by Mikhail Anikushin, "Nurse", "Uzbek woman", "Uzbek Girl" by Irina Baldina, "Portrait of Mikhedko" by Yuri Belov, "Fisherman" by Dmitry Belyaev, "Portrait of son" by Olga Bogaevskaya, "Natasha" by Maria Kleschar-Samokhvalova, "Selfportrait" by Boris Korneev, "Grandmother and grandson" by Elena Kostenko, "Komi Girl" by Engels Kozlov, "Female Portrait (Rosa. Portrait of wife)" by Yaroslav Krestovsky, "Portrait of son", "Portrait of girl" by Valeria Larina, "Portrait of locksmith Znema", "Engineer Natasha Mayboroda", "Portrait of welder Victor Lysitsyn", "Portrait of linguist Gofman", "Plasterer Taisia Tupikova" by Anatoli Levitin, "Man's portrait", "Portrait of girl" by Oleg Lomakin, "Portrait of organist Isaya Braudo" by Lia Ostrova, "Portrait of artist Alexander Pushnin" by Varlen Pen, "Ostap grandfather" by Stepan Privedentsev, "Portrait of Mikhail Birev, notable artist from Kholuy" by Semion Rotnitsky, "Vladimir Mayakovsky" by Konstantin Simun, "Selfportrait" by Alexander Tatarenko, "A Portrait" by Mikhail Trufanov, "Selfportrait" by Valery Vatenin, and others.

Genre painting was presented of "Girlfriends", "Veranda" by Piotr Alberti, "Summer" by Nikolai Baskakov, "Construction in Siberia" by Nikolai Galakhov, "Our tents" by Alexei Eremin, "Golden wedding", "School", "A Love", "A Lullaby" by Anatoli Kaplan, "The Muddy Morning" by Boris Korneev, "On vocation" by Gevork Kotiantz, "Northern village" by Engels Kozlov, "Foundation pit in the night" by Anatoli Levitin, "Big Oil", "Astrakhan" by Boris Maluev, "For what?", "Freedom", "Song", "Appell", "Gott mit uns", "He won", "Do not forget" by Evsey Moiseenko, "The Three Ages", "In the sanatorium for children", "At the wattle fence", "Meet the goats", "For grass" by Mikhail Natarevich, "A Sleep" by Vera Nazina, "At the Peter and Paul Fortress" by Lev Orekhov, "Seaport in Tuapse" by Stepan Privedentsev, "Stadium of the factory "Krasnaya Zarya", "Studio of artist Igor Veselkin" by Gleb Savinov, "Ferry in Staraya Ladoga", "Main street in Novaya Ladoga", "Novaya Ladoga in Holiday", "Novaya Ladoga. Pier in fishermen village" by Arseny Semionov, "Leningrad motive" by Kim Slavin, "Staraya Ladoga. Midday on the farm", "Novaya Ladoga. At the buoy keeper" by Alexander Sokolov, "Miners", "On a beach", "In Studio", "Wild beach", "To Moscow" by Mikhail Trufanov, "Turkmen carpet weavers" by Yuri Tulin, "Pskov", "At the seaside" by Boris Ugarov, "On the Komsomol construction" by Anatoli Vasiliev, and others.

Landscape and Cityscape were presented of "Apple-tree" by Evgenia Antipova, "On the Zhdanovka River" by Taisia Afonina, "Spring day" by Sergei Babkov, "Olkhon Island" by Dmitry Belyaev, "Gavan district in winter" by Nikolai Galakhov, "Bakhchysarai", "In the town of Pechory" by Ivan Godlevsky, "Little yard" by Vladimir Gavrilov, "Boats", "Pier", "Factory backwater" by Vladimir Gorb, "Winter etude" by Abram Grushko, "On Onega Lake", "Birches", "In the foothills of the Tian Shan" by Alexei Eremin, "Street in Znojmo town", "Spit of Vasilievsky Island" by Mikhail Kaneev, "Chersonesus" by Maria Kleschar-Samokhvalova, "A Spring", "A Winter" by Vladimir Konashevich, "Cloudy day", "Oats", "Highway", "Veranda", "Fields" by Boris Korneev, "The Leningrad", "After Snowfall" by Alexander Koroviakov, "The Muddy Day", "Open yard" by Victor Korovin, "Early March" by Mikhail Kozell, "Oredezh River", "Wyra village" by Marina Kozlovskaya, "The Leningrad. Before sunrise" by Yaroslav Krestovsky, "Vyborg. Fortress", "Borisoglebsk", "Nikitski Monastery in Pereslavl-Zalessky", "Borisoglebsk in winter" by Valeria Larina, "Black River" by Boris Lavrenko, "Windy day" by Ivan Lavsky, "Ice drift on the Yenisei not yet started" by Anatoli Levitin, "Spring", "Valentinovka village" by Oleg Lomakin, "A Morning", "A Road to Mikhaylovskoye village" by Gavriil Malish, "In the sea" by Nikolai Mukho, "A Winter" by Mikhail Natarevich, "Winter evening", "Spring flood" by Piotr Nazarov, "Rainy day", "Moyka River in the night" by Yaroslav Nikolaev, "Kizhi Pogost" by Dmitry Oboznenko, "Spring greens" by Lev Orekhov, "Pskov land", "Pskov street", "Towards evening", "On the Griboyedov Canal in Leningrad", "Winter road" by Sergei Osipov, "Sergei Yesenin's birth house" by Vladimir Ovchinnikov, "Spring etude" by Nikolai Pozdneev, "Ancient Kholuy" by Semion Rotnitsky, "Overcast day" by Galina Rumiantseva, "Spring in Sablino", "February day" by Ivan Savenko, "Staraya Ladoga", "Spring wind", "Outskirts" by Gleb Savinov, "Park in winter" by Alexander Semionov, "Leningrad. Factory motive" by Arseny Semionov, "Rostov the Great", "Old Tower", "Okhta district. View of the factory", "Volodarsky Bridge" by Nadezhda Shteinmiller, "Wet stacks" by Kim Slavin, "February", "Twilight in Staraya Ladoga" by Alexander Sokolov, "Gray day", "A village on the Msta River" by Alexander Stolbov, "Street in Kholuy", "A Porch. The Autumn", "Evening sun", "Landscape" by Nikolai Timkov, "Gurzuf" by Mikhail Trufanov, "Spring in Turkmenistan" by Mikhail Trufanov, "Evening", "A Winter", "Venice" by Boris Ugarov, "Autumn", "Street in Staraya Ladoga", "Last snow", "Staraya Ladoga" by Ivan Varichev, "Spring on the Angara River" by Anatoli Vasiliev, "Volkhov River", "Flowering Bird Cherry", "Winter window", "Twilight" by Vecheslav Zagonek, "October in Crimea", "Lake Ritsa", "Early spring" by Elena Zhukova, and others.

Still life paintings were presented of "Wildflowers" by Evgenia Antipova, "Roses", "Still life with oranges", "Still life" by Olga Bogaevskaya, "Roses in Crystal vase", "Bird Cherry tree branches" by Vladimir Konashevich, "Apples and Pears", "Snowdrop flowers", "Yellow flowers" by Maya Kopitseva, "Still life" by Yaroslav Krestovsky, "Jasmine. Still life", "Sunflowers" by Lia Ostrova, "Still Life with Peaches", "Still life with Melon", "Still life with Bananas" by Genrikh Pavlovsky, "Baskets" by Nikolai Pozdneev, "Still life with fish", "Still life with quince" by Elena Skuin, "Larch branches" by Kim Slavin, "Still life" by Victor Teterin, "Still life with radish", "Flowers in white vase", "Still life with Bananas", "Still life with tomatoes", "Still life on the green table-cloth" by Alexander Vedernikov, "Still life" by Rostislav Vovkushevsky, and others.

== Acknowledgment ==
Autumn Exhibition of Leningrad artists of 1962 was widely covered in press and in literature on Soviet fine art.

== See also ==
- Fine Art of Leningrad
- Leningrad School of Painting
- 1962 in fine arts of the Soviet Union
- Saint Petersburg Union of Artists
- Socialist realism

== Sources ==
- Осенняя выставка произведений ленинградских художников 1962 года. Каталог. Л., Художник РСФСР, 1962.
- Справочник членов Ленинградской организации Союза художников РСФСР. Л., Художник РСФСР, 1980.
- Художники народов СССР. Биобиблиографический словарь. Т.1-4. М., Искусство, 1970-1995.
- Справочник членов Союза художников СССР. Т.1-2. М., Советский художник, 1979.
- Хроника узловых событий художественной жизни России 1960-1980-х годов // Time for Change. The Art of 1960-1985 in the Soviet Union. Saint Petersburg, State Russian Museum, 2006.
- Sergei V. Ivanov. Unknown Socialist Realism. The Leningrad School. Saint Petersburg, NP-Print Edition, 2007. P.394, 417, 442. ISBN 5-901724-21-6, ISBN 978-5-901724-21-7
- Юбилейный Справочник выпускников Санкт-Петербургского академического института живописи, скульптуры и архитектуры имени И. Е. Репина Российской Академии художеств. 1915—2005. Санкт Петербург, «Первоцвет», 2007.
