= Leningrad regional art exhibition (1964) =

1964 Soviet art exhibition

"Leningrad" Zonal Art Exhibition. Leningrad, 1964. Catalog cover
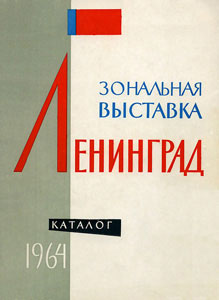
- Year: 1964
- Location: State Russian Museum; Leningrad

Zonal Art Exhibition "Leningrad" (Leningrad, 1964) (Russian: Зональная выставка "Ленинград" 1964 года) became one of the most significant, successful and productive events in the history of Soviet art exhibitions of the 1960s through the 1980s. The exhibition took place in State Russian Museum.

== History and organization ==
The Zonal Art Exhibition "Leningrad" was opened at November 3, 1964. Organization and preparation of the Zonal Exhibition engaged a specially formed Exhibition Committee which consisted of 56 of the most authoritative art-experts. Among them were Mikhail Anikushin, Boris Korneev, Anatoli Levitin, Yuri Neprintsev, Gleb Savinov, Joseph Serebriany, Nadezhda Shteinmiller, Mikhail Trufanov, Yuri Tulin, Boris Ugarov, Vecheslav Zagonek, Alexander Zaytsev, and others. It was published a catalog of the exhibition. Over 1200 Leningrad artists participated in the exhibition, which featured 2,000 pieces of artwork from painters, sculptors, graphic artists, masters of arts and crafts, and theater and film artists.

== Contributing artists ==
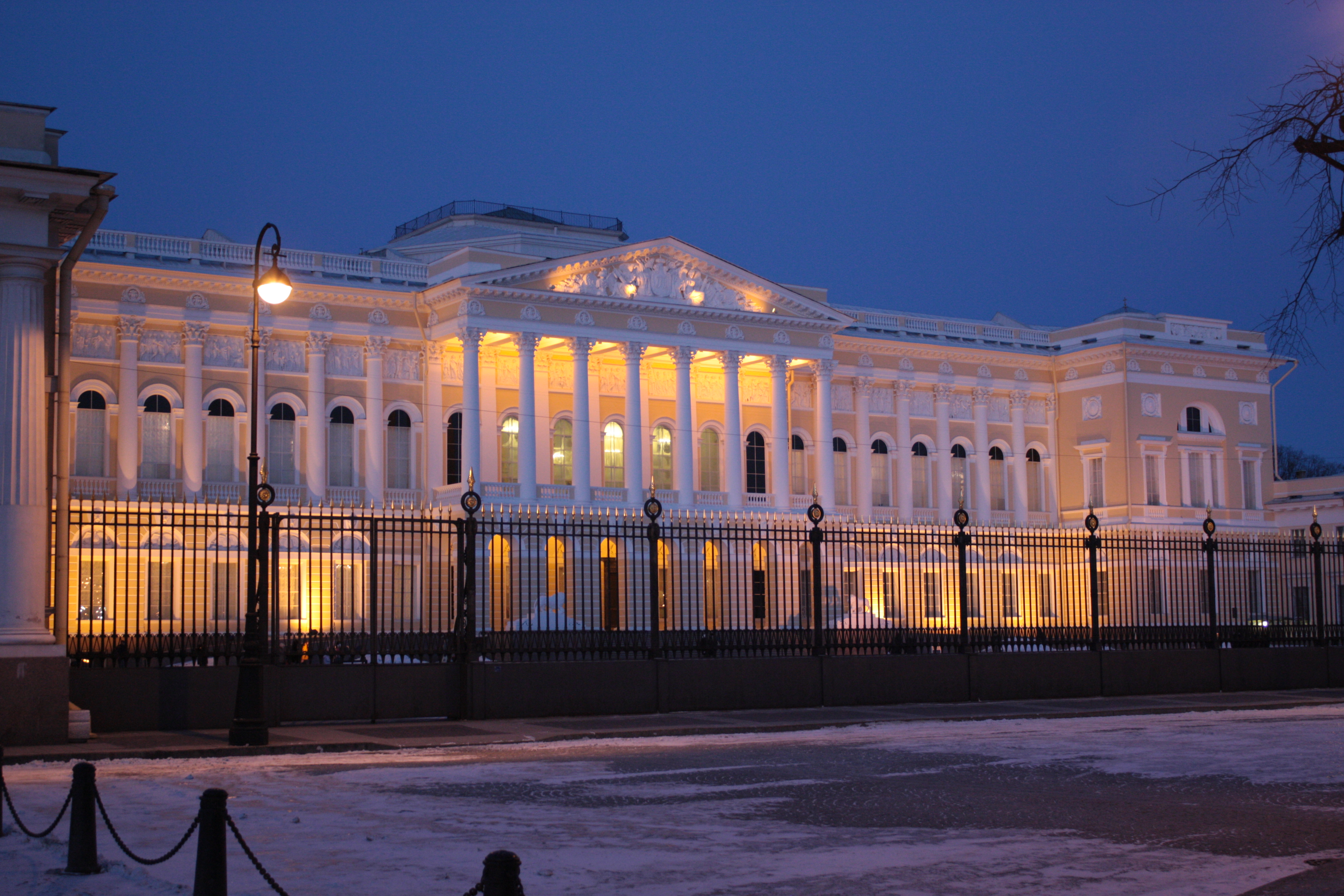
State Russian Museum

In the largest Department of Painting were exhibited 712 art works of 281 authors. There were Piotr Alberti, Evgenia Antipova, Taisia Afonina, Sergei Babkov, Irina Baldina, Andrei Bantikov, Nikolai Baskakov, Leonid Baykov, Evgenia Baykova, Vsevolod Bazhenov, Yuri Belov, Piotr Belousov, Dmitry Belyaev, Olga Bogaevskaya, Lev Bogomolets, Nikolai Brandt, Dmitry Buchkin, Piotr Buchkin, Zlata Bizova, Lev Chegorovsky, Vladimir Chekalov, Sergei Frolov, Nikolai Galakhov, Ivan Godlevsky, Vasily Golubev, Tatiana Gorb, Abram Grushko, Oleg Eremeev, Alexei Eriomin, Mikhail Kaneev, Yuri Khukhrov, Maria Kleschar-Samokhvalova, Mikhail Kozell, Marina Kozlovskaya, Tatiana Kopnina, Maya Kopitseva, Boris Korneev, Alexander Koroviakov, Elena Kostenko, Nikolai Kostrov, Anna Kostrova, Gevork Kotiantz, Yaroslav Krestovsky, Valeria Larina, Boris Lavrenko, Ivan Lavsky, Anatoli Levitin, Piotr Litvinsky, Oleg Lomakin, Dmitry Maevsky, Gavriil Malish, Eugene Maltsev, Boris Maluev, Yuri Mezhirov, Evsey Moiseenko, Nikolai Mukho, Andrei Mylnikov, Piotr Nazarov, Vera Nazina, Mikhail Natarevich, Anatoli Nenartovich, Yuri Neprintsev, Yaroslav Nikolaev, Dmitry Oboznenko, Victor Oreshnikov, Sergei Osipov, Lia Ostrova, Vyacheslav Ovchinnikov, Vladimir Ovchinnikov, Filaret Pakun, Yuri Pavlov, Genrikh Pavlovsky, Varlen Pen, Nikolai Pozdneev, Stepan Privedentsev, Alexander Pushnin, Semion Rotnitsky, Galina Rumiantseva, Ivan Savenko, Gleb Savinov, Vladimir Sakson, Alexander Samokhvalov, Vladimir Seleznev, Arseny Semionov, Alexander Semionov, Joseph Serebriany, Yuri Shablikin, Boris Shamanov, Alexander Shmidt, Nadezhda Shteinmiller, Elena Skuin, Kim Slavin, Galina Smirnova, Alexander Sokolov, Ivan Sorokin, Victor Teterin, Nikolai Timkov, Mikhail Tkachev, Mikhail Trufanov, Yuri Tulin, Vitaly Tulenev, Boris Ugarov, Ivan Varichev, Anatoli Vasiliev, Piotr Vasiliev, Valery Vatenin, Lazar Yazgur, Vecheslav Zagonek, Sergei Zakharov, Ruben Zakharian, Alexander Zaytsev, Elena Zhukova, and others most prominent painters of the Leningrad School.

In the Department of Sculptures were exhibited art works of 300 sculptors, among them were Nathan Altman, Mikhail Anikushin, Vladimir Ingal, Andrei Khaustov, Nikolai Kochukov, Alexey Koroluck, Igor Krestovsky, Levon Lazarev, Konstantin Simun, Iya Venkova, and others. Department of graphics presented a creation of 82 artists, among them were Piotr Belousov, Sergei Frolov, Tatiana Gorb, Mikhail Kaneev, Nikolai Kostrov, Anna Kostrova, Yuri Neprintsev, Victor Oreshnikov, Alexei Pakhomov, Varlen Pen, Alexander Vedernikov, Vladimir Vetrogonsky, and others. In the Department of Theatric and Scenery art were exhibited art works of 38 artists, among them were Nathan Altman, Mikhail Bobyshov, Tatiana Bruni, Eugene Eney, Eduard Kochergin, Bella Manevich-Kaplan, Nadezhda Shteinmiller, Unovich Sophya, and others.

== Contributed artworks ==
For the exhibition were selected artworks created in the years of 1963–1964, as well as some earlier works. All were exhibited in the first time. Some of them were subsequently found in the collections of leading Soviet art museums, as well as domestic and foreign galleries and collectors.

Historical genre was represented of "The enemy is not broke through" by Sergei Babkov, "October. Triptych", "Red Guards" by Mikhail Natarevich, "Bloody Sunday. January 9, 1905" by Dmitry Oboznenko, "Evacuation in Ladoga" by Piotr Nazarov, "October" by Boris Ugarov, "Petersburg. 9 of May, 1864. Nikolai Chernyshevsky" by Lev Chegorovsky, "The Road of Life", "The Year of 1941", "Ice Highway. Ladoga 23 of April 1942", "Year of 1941" by Boris Korneev, "Leningrad in the Struggle" by Oleg Lomakin, "Bread. The Year of 1941" by Yuri Neprintsev, "Roads of War" by Boris Nikolaev, "A Heir" by Genrikh Pavlovsky, and some others.

Portrait painting was represented of "Portrait of Olga Bergholz" by Taisia Afonina, "Girl in the Garden" by Evgenia Antipova, Uzbeks by Irina Baldina, "Poultry Woman", "Fishermen" by Nikolai Baskakov, "Baykal fisherman", "Zoya" by Dmitry Belyaev, "A Son" by Olga Bogaevskaya, "A Worker" by Nikolai Brandt, "Pensioners" by Piotr Buchkin, "Sculptor Osunde" by Oleg Eremeev, "Semyon Budyonny" by Yuri Khukhrov, "Discoverer of Yakutia Diamonds Lfrisa Popugaeva" by Boris Korneev, "Portrait of Academician Mikhail Kostenko" by Elena Kostenko, "Portrait of Plasterer", "Portrait of Basketball Player Tanya Ivanova" by Valeria Larina, "Portrait of People's Artist V. I. Chestnokov", "Portrait of art-critic Abdulhai", "Portrait of Yuri Vasiliev" by Anatoli Levitin, "Portrait of Old Bolshevic Andreev", "Zoya - Komsomol Member of Dzerzhinsky Sovkhoz" by Dmitry Maevsky, "Engineers" by Eugene Maltsev, "Marina" by Boris Maluev, "Natasha", "Sergei Esenin with Grandfather" by Evsey Moiseenko, "Verochka" by Andrei Mylnikov, "Portrait of Daughter" by Vera Nazina, "Young Pioneer Organizer" by Yuri Neprintsev, "Portrait of Academician Kuprijanov" by Yaroslav Nikolaev, "Portrait of Professor Sazonov", "Portrait of Innovator Trutnev", "Portrait of Student Irina Kovaleva" by Victor Oreshnikov, "Portrait of father and son Kuznetsov", "Portrait of artist Ludmila Goltseva" by Lia Ostrova, "Governess" by Vyacheslav Ovchinnikov, "Portrait of art critic Dyakonitsin" by Yuri Pavlov, "Portrait of V. Kukin, known builder" by Genrikh Pavlovsky, "Academicians Semionov and Kargin" by Varlen Pen, "Portrait of artist Leonid Ovsannikov", "Portrait of Academician Alexander Lebedev", "Portrait of composer Vasily Solovyov-Sedoi", "Serioga" by Semion Rotnitsky, "Portrait of composer Dmitri Shostakovich" by Joseph Serebriany, "Portrait of Artist in Porcalain Nina Slavina" by Kim Slavin, "Portrait of Melnikov", "Femail Portrait" by Mikhail Trufanov, "Tanya", "Portrait of Wife" by Boris Ugarov, "Portrait of fisherwoman Busarova" by Alexander Zaytsev, and some others.

Genre painting was represented of "Work" by Piotr Alberti, "Soviet sailors in India" by Andrei Bantikov, "Spring in kolkhoz", "The Plane Arrived" by Leonid Baykov, "Komsomol construction" by Dmitry Belyaev, "Requiem" by Lev Bogomolets, "After surgery" by Piotr Buchkin, "At the Monument to Heros" by Oleg Eremeev, "Guests have Gone" by Maya Kopitseva, "After Bath" by Elena Kostenko, "In the Way", "A Midday" by Boris Lavrenko, "Night Shift", "On the way" by Anatoli Levitin, "Donbass", "Oilmen. A Youth" by Boris Maluev, "Friends", "Ground", "From the Childhood" by Evsey Moiseenko, "May Demonstration" by Nikolai Mukho, "Young Mothers" by Mikhail Natarevich, "Asphalt Layings" Anatoli Nenartovich, "The Tram has Coming to Front" by Yuri Neprintsev, "Haymaking Time" by Sergei Osipov, "To the Home", "At Baba Sasha House", "On the Lawn" by Nikolai Pozdneev, "In a Cornfield" by Stepan Privedentsev, "Talking in Workshop" by Semion Rotnitsky, "Seamen", "Mothers" by Gleb Savinov, "Road to the Sandpit" by Vladimir Sakson, "Alexander Block with Working Picket" by Alexander Samokhvalov, "Summer", "Green Rye" by Boris Shamanov, "Harvesting" by Mikhail Tkachev, "To the School" by Vitaly Tulenev, "Night Shift" by Valery Vatenin, "Chukotka Spring", "Firstborn", "Returning of Hunters", "Gatherer of Roots", "Waiting", "May" by Andrew Yakovlev, and some others.

Landscape and Cityscape were represented of "Leningrad Port" by Vsevolod Bazhenov, "A road to Baykal Lake" by Dmitry Belyaev, "Grafsky Bay" by Lev Bogomolets, "Lanskoy Highway" by Dmitry Buchkin, "Forest Weekdays", "Red Navy Embankment", "For our Buildings", "The Neva River is freezing" by Nikolay Galakhov, "In the St Peter and Paul Fortress", "At the Anichkov Bridge", "Morning City" by Ivan Godlevsky, "Moring in Karelia", "Bird-cherry is blooming", "On Onega Lake" by Alexei Eriomin, "Malaya Sadovaya", "Near St. Isaac Cathedral" by Mikhail Kaneev, "Winter Morning" by Elena Kostenko, "Wet Asphalt" by Alexander Koroviakov, "Plowed Ground" by Mikhail Kozell, "Native Place" by Engels Kozlov, "Volkhov River", "Altai", "The Rain is over" by Marina Kozlovskaya, "Time of Sunrise. Fontanka River", "Frosty Day", "Evening. Baltyisky Factory", "A New Outskirts" by Yaroslav Krestovsky, "At the Gostiny Dvor" by Piotr Litvinsky, "Suburb" by Oleg Lomakin, "October", "Pskov", "Winter Landscape" by Gavriil Malish, "City grows" by Eugene Maltsev, "Leningrad" by Yuri Mezhirov, "First Snow", "Spring" by Lidia Milova, "Apple Trees in Winter", "Ravine", "Kazantip", "Old Bukhara" by Evsey Moiseenko, "Line Vasilievsky Island", "New Building on Okhta" by Nikolai Mukho, "At the River" by Mikhail Natarevich, "Early Morning", "In the Morning", "Spring Sun" by Vera Nazina, "Last Snow", "Forest Wakes-up", "Willow is Blooming", "Winter" by Dmitry Oboznenko, "At Kanonersky Shipyard", "October" by Vladimir Ovchinnikov, "Rowan Tree" Nikolai Pozdneev, "Spring Day" by Leonid Ptytsyn, "Shop" by Galina Rumiantseva, "Old Trees", "April", "October", "Daybreak" by Vladimir Sakson, "On the Neva River", "Towards Spring" by Alexander Semionov, "Leningrad. View on the University Embankment", "Tallinn. View on the Seashore", "Tallinn's Motifs", "Construction of Zanevsky Bridge over the Neva River", "Leningrad. A Factory district" by Arseny Semionov, "Leningrad Street", "Winter Palace Yard" by Alexander Shmidt, "In Winter" by Nadezhda Shteinmiller, "Moyka", "Suburb", "Gryboedova Channel" by Kim Slavin, "A Holiday Evening", "Petrogradskaya Side", "Behind Narvskaya Gates", "End of Winter", "Autumn Cherry Trees", "February Azure" by Nikolai Timkov, "Black River", "At the Moorage" by Mikhail Trufanov, "Spring in Ostrov Village", "Ice Drifting", "Silver Cities", "Daybreak" by Vitaly Tulenev, "March", "October", "Twilight", "Suburb" by Boris Ugarov, "Onega Seashore", "Blue Water", "Mosha River", "Boats in the evening" by Piotr Fomin, "Autumn Time", "Sunny Day", "Winter Morning", "Wet Ground", "A March. Weekdays" by Vecheslav Zagonek, "Winter in Senezh" by Ruben Zakharian, "A Night on the Neva River" by Alexander Zaytsev, "A Midday on the Neva River", "Currants in the garden", "Leningrad seaside" by Elena Zhukova, and some others.

Still-life paintings were presented of "Flowers and Fruits" by Evgenia Antipova, "Flowers. Still-life" by Evgenia Baykova, "Still-life with Black Currant", "Still-life. Maize", "Still-life. Red Poppies" by Olga Bogaevskaya, "Still-life" by Maria Kleschar-Samohvalova, "Still-life on the Red Table-cloth", "Apple Tree", "Bird-cherry Tree", "Poppies and Oranges", "Still-life with Decanter" by Maya Kopitseva, "Breakfast. Still-life", "Still-life" by Gevork Kotiantz, "Mellon and grapes", "Chardzhou's Mellon", "Breakfast on the logs" by Genrikh Pavlovsky, "Smoked Vobla", "Bread" by Nikolai Pozdneev, "Poppies" by Galina Rumiantseva, "Branch" by Gleb Savinov, "Tobacco", "Gardening Still-life", "Geranium" by Elena Skuin, "A Tea. Still-life" by Kim Slavin, "Quince and Pears" by Victor Teterin, "Fruits. Still-life" by Sergei Zakharov, "Spring Bouquet" by Elena Zhukova, and some others.

== Acknowledgment ==
The Zonal Art Exhibition "Leningrad" of 1964 was widely covered in press and in literature on Soviet fine art.

== See also ==
- Fine Art of Leningrad
- Leningrad School of Painting
- 1964 in fine arts of the Soviet Union
- Saint Petersburg Union of Artists
- Socialist realism

== Sources ==
- Вьюнова И. Главный герой - современник // Искусство, 1965, No. 3. C.6-10.
- Молдавский Д. "Ленинград". На зональных художественных выставках // Литературная Россия, 27 ноября 1964.
- Зональная выставка "Ленинград". Л., Художник РСФСР, 1965. 252 C.
- Аникушин М. Солнце на полотнах // Ленинградская правда, 3 ноября 1964 года.
- Дмитренко А. Взором современника. О выставке "Ленинград" // Смена, 27 декабря 1964 года.
- Копелян Г. Удачи и просчёты молодых. О Зональной выставке "Ленинград" // Смена, 28 ноября 1964.
- Колесова О. Две тысячи встреч. На выставке «Ленинград». // Ленинградская правда, 1964, 4 ноября.
- Справочник членов Ленинградской организации Союза художников РСФСР. Л., Художник РСФСР, 1980.
- Художники народов СССР. Биобиблиографический словарь. Т.1-4. М., Искусство, 1970–1995
- Справочник членов Союза художников СССР. Том 1,2. — М: Советский художник, 1979.
- Дмитренко А. Ф. Зональные (региональные) и республиканские выставки в художественной жизни России 1960-1980-х годов. // Время перемен. Искусство 1960—1985 в Советском Союзе. — Санкт-Петербург: Государственный Русский музей, 2006. С.31-33. ISBN 5-93332-199-0.
- Хроника узловых событий художественной жизни России 1960-1980-х годов // Time for Change: The Art of 1960–1985 in the Soviet Union. Saint Petersburg, State Russian Museum, 2006.
- Sergei V. Ivanov. Unknown Socialist Realism: The Leningrad School. Saint Petersburg: NP-Print Edition, 2007. P.394. ISBN 5-901724-21-6, ISBN 978-5-901724-21-7
- Юбилейный Справочник выпускников Санкт-Петербургского академического института живописи, скульптуры и архитектуры имени И. Е. Репина Российской Академии художеств. 1915—2005. Санкт-Петербург, «Первоцвет», 2007.
