= Evgenia Antipova =

Russian painter (1917–2009)

Evgenia Petrovna Antipova
- Born: 19 October 1917; Toropets, Pskov Governorate, Russia
- Died: 27 January 2009 (aged 91); Saint Petersburg, Russia
- Education: Repin Institute of Arts
- Known for: Painting
- Movement: Socialist realism, Leningrad School of Painting

Evgenia Petrovna Antipova (Russian: Евге́ния Петро́вна Анти́пова; 19 October 1917 – 27 January 2009) was a Russian painter, graphic artist, and art teacher. She was known for her genre compositions, portraits, landscapes, and still life paintings, which she created using oils and watercolours. Among her favourite themes were apple orchards and Crimean landscapes.

Antipova lived and worked in Saint Petersburg, known as Leningrad during the Soviet period, and is regarded as one of the main representatives of the Leningrad School of Painting. From 1953, she was a member of the Leningrad Union of Soviet Artists, now called the Saint Petersburg Union of Artists.

== Biography ==
Evgenia Petrovna Antipova was born on 19 October 1917 in Toropets, a small town located about halfway between Moscow and Saint Petersburg. Her father was an office worker for a railway company. Antipova lived with her parents in Samara on the Volga River until 1928. While living there, she began working in an artistic studio under the direction of Pavel Krasnov. In 1935, Antipova moved to Leningrad. The following year, she began studying at the Leningrad Secondary Art School, part of the All-Russian Academy of Arts, where she stayed until 1939. Her teachers were Leonid Ovsyannikov, Alexander Zaytsev, Leonid Sholokhov, Alexander Debler, and Vladimir Gorb.

In 1939, Antipova entered the painting department of the Repin Institute of Painting, Sculpture, and Architecture, where she studied with Semion Abugov, Genrikh Pavlovsky, Alexander Osmerkin, Gleb Savinov, and Vladimir Malagis. That same year, Antipova participated in the All-Union Youth Artistic Exhibition in Moscow, where she presented her sketch, Valery Chkalov among young people. Later that year, this sketch was printed in an art magazine, Young Artist.

Antipova began the summer of 1941 in western Ukraine, where she was taking part in a summer program, but the invasion of the Soviet Union by Nazi Germany soon prompted her to return to Leningrad. On 18 July 1941, Antipova married Jacov Lukash, a fourth-year student of the department of monumental painting. Lukash was drafted into the Red Army and died while away in May 1942. Antipova remained in the encircled city of Leningrad until the beginning of 1942, when she was evacuated to Novosibirsk, where she stayed until the end of the war.

In 1945, Antipova returned to Leningrad, and in 1950, she graduated from the Repin Institute of Arts in Boris Ioganson's personal art studio (the former studio of Alexander Osmerkin). Her graduate work was a painting called Andrey Zhdanov visits the Palace of Young Pioneers in Leningrad.

== Career ==
From 1950–1956, Antipova taught painting and composition at Tavricheskaya Art School in Leningrad and participated in several art exhibitions. She focused on expressing her individual perspective in her works. In 1953, she was accepted into the Leningrad Union of Artists.

In the 1960s, she created a series of portraits, most notably A Girl from Pereslavl and Waitress (both 1964). Some of her other paintings from the 1950s and early 1960s include:

- Practical exercises: (1953)
- Gurzuf in the morning (1954)
- A Sea is in Gurzufe (1954)
- Still life (1957)
- On a Summer Residence (1958)
- At the Peter and Paul Fortress (1960)
- Taffies (1960)
- Wild Flower Bouquet (1960)
- Apple tree (1962)
- Early breakfast (1963)
- A Girl in the garden (1964)

From the end of the 1960s, her favoured genres were still life and landscape. She had a notable interest in the transmission of colour, light, and air. Among her most well-known works of this period are:

- City courtyard in Gavan (1968)
- Sonth Still Life (1968)
- Grape Arbor (1968)
- Romantic landscape (1968)
- A Window. Nasturtiums (1968)
- Olives-trees (1969)
- Tulips on a window (1970)
- Pine-trees (1973)
- On the Vasilievskiy island (1973)
- Still life in the garden. A Spring (1974)
- Still life with Cornflowers and bread (1975)
- Balcony (1977)
- Still life with a Red Bottle (1979)
- Sunny Day (1982)
- Still life with a Spanish Jug (1985)
- Bird cherry tree in flower (1989)
- Blooming Little Apple-tree (1997)

In the still life paintings, Antipova notably prefers the open composition style wherein the content is imagined to continue outside the frame, as opposed to being neatly contained within it. This can be seen in the works A Midday (1982) and Flowering willow, Calla lilies, Daffodils (1984). A primary theme in her paintings is the idealized world in which man can find harmony with nature. She continued to make art with this theme until her death.

Evgenia Antipova had personal exhibitions in Saint Petersburg in 1967, 1988, 1999, and 2007, alongside her husband, artist Victor Teterin. In 1989–1992, paintings by Antipova were exhibited at fine art auctions and exhibitions of Russian paintings, including at L'École de Leningrad, in France. She died on 27 January 2009 in Saint Petersburg, aged 91. Her paintings reside in the State Russian Museum, and in many art museums and private collections in Russia, France, Germany, the United States, the United Kingdom, and around the world.

== See also ==
- A Midday (painting)
- Fine Art of Leningrad
- Leningrad School of Painting
- List of Russian artists
- List of 20th-century Russian painters
- List of painters of Saint Petersburg Union of Artists
- Saint Petersburg Union of Artists

== Sources ==
- Весенняя выставка произведений ленинградских художников 1954 года. Каталог. Л., Изогиз, 1954. С.7.
- Весенняя выставка произведений ленинградских художников 1955 года. Каталог. Л., ЛССХ, 1956. С.7, 27.
- 1917–1957. Выставка произведений ленинградских художников. Каталог. Л., Ленинградский художник, 1958. С.8.
- Выставка произведений ленинградских художников 1960 года. Каталог. Л., Художник РСФСР, 1963. С.7.
- Выставка произведений ленинградских художников 1960 года. Каталог. Л., Художник РСФСР, 1961. С.8.
- Выставка произведений ленинградских художников 1961 года. Каталог. — Л: Художник РСФСР, 1964. — с.8.
- Осенняя выставка произведений ленинградских художников 1962 года. Каталог. — Л: Художник РСФСР, 1962. — с.7.
- Ленинград. Зональная выставка 1964 года. Каталог. Л, Художник РСФСР, 1965. C.8.
- Каталог весенней выставки произведений ленинградских художников 1965 года. Л, Художник РСФСР, 1970. C.7.
- Весенняя выставка произведений ленинградских художников 1969 года. Каталог. Л., Художник РСФСР, 1970. C.7.
- Художники народов СССР. Биобиблиографический словарь. Т.1. М., Искусство, 1970. C.165.
- Весенняя выставка произведений ленинградских художников 1971 года. Каталог. — Л: Художник РСФСР, 1972. — с.7.
- По родной стране. Выставка произведений художников Ленинграда. 50 Летию образования СССР посвящается. Каталог. Л., Художник РСФСР, 1974. C.9.
- Каталог выставки одиннадцати ленинградских художников. — Л: Художник РСФСР, 1976.
- Выставка произведений художников-женщин Ленинграда. 1975 год. Л., Художник РСФСР, 1979. C.11.
- Наш современник. Зональная выставка произведений ленинградских художников 1975 года. Каталог. Л., Художник РСФСР, 1980. C.11.
- Изобразительное искусство Ленинграда. Каталог выставки. Л., Художник РСФСР, 1976. C.14.
- Выставка произведений ленинградских художников, посвященная 60-летию Великого Октября. Л., Художник РСФСР, 1982. C.11.
- Справочник членов Союза художников СССР. Том 1. — М: Советский художник, 1979. — с.50.
- Зональная выставка произведений ленинградских художников 1980 года. Каталог. Л., Художник РСФСР, 1983. C.9.
- Петербург — Петроград — Ленинград в произведениях русских и советских художников. Каталог выставки. Л., Художник РСФСР, 1980. С.124.
- Выставки советского изобразительного искусства. Справочник. Том 5. 1954–1958 годы. — М: Советский художник, 1981. — с.10, 25, 126, 142, 281, 385, 420.
- Справочник членов Ленинградской организации Союза художников РСФСР. — Л: Художник РСФСР, 1987. — с.7.
- Выставка произведений 26 ленинградских и московских художников. Каталог. Л., Художник РСФСР, 1990. C.14–15, 47.
- L' École de Leningrad. Catalogue. Paris, Drouot Richelieu. 1990, 11 Juin 1990. Р.136–137.
- Charmes Russes. Catalogue. Paris, Drouot Richelieu. 1991, 15 Mai 1991. Р.64.
- Peinture Russe. Catalogue. Paris, Drouot Richelieu. 1991, 18 Fevrier. Р.7,54–55.
- Peinture Russe. Catalogue. Paris, Drouot Richelieu. 1991, 26 Avril. Р.7,18–19.
- Этюд в творчестве ленинградских художников. Выставка произведений. Каталог. СПб., 1994. С.3.
- Лирика в произведениях художников военного поколения. Выставка произведений. Каталог. СПб., 1995. С.3.
- Петербургские музы. Выставка. Живопись, графика, декоративно-прикладное искусство. — СПб: Мемориальный музей Н. А. Некрасова, 1995.
- Памяти учителя. Выставка петербургских художников — учеников мастерской А. А. Осмеркина. СПб., 1997. С.3,5.
- Связь времен. 1932–1997. Художники — члены Санкт-Петербургского Союза художников России. Каталог выставки. СПб., 1997. С.282.
- Matthew Cullerne Bown. A Dictionary of Twentieth Century Russian And Soviet Painters. 1900 — 1980s. — London: Izomar Limited, 1998.
- Евгения Антипова, Виктор Тетерин. Живопись. Графика. СПб., 1999. С.44.
- Художники круга 11-ти. Из коллекции Николая Кононихина. СПб, 2001. С.3.
- Художники — городу. Выставка к 70-летию Санкт-Петербургского Союза художников. Каталог. — Петрополь, 2003. — с.26, 178.
- Anniversary Directory graduates of Saint Petersburg State Academic Institute of Painting, Sculpture, and Architecture named after Ilya Repin, Russian Academy of Arts. 1915–2005. Saint-Petersburg, Pervotsvet Publishing House, 2007. P.61-62.
- А. В. Данилова. Группа одиннадцати как художественное явление в изобразительном искусстве Ленинграда 1960–1980 годов.//Общество. Среда. Развитие. Научно-теоретический журнал. № 3, 2010. С.160–164.
- Evgenia Antipova. A Midday // 80 years of the Saint Petersburg Union of Artists. The Anniversary Exhibition. Saint Petersburg, 2012. P.212.
- Логвинова Е. Круглый стол по ленинградскому искусству в галерее АРКА // Петербургские искусствоведческие тетради. Вып. 31. СПб, 2014. С.17-26.
