= Spring exhibition (Leningrad, 1965) =

1965 Soviet art exhibition

Spring Exhibition of Leningrad artists of 1965. Catalog
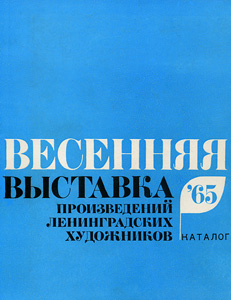
- Year: 1965
- Location: Leningrad Union of Soviet Artists Exhibition Halls, Leningrad

Spring Exhibition of Leningrad artists of 1965 (Russian: Весенняя выставка произведений ленинградских художников 1965 года) opened in the Exhibition Halls of the Leningrad Union of Soviet Artists and became one of the largest Art Exhibitions of the year in the USSR.

== History and Organization ==
For the organization and preparation of the Exhibition, it was specially formed an Exhibition Committee consisting of 14 of the most authoritative art-experts of the epoch. The Exhibition Catalog had been published and in total, the Exhibition displayed almost 600 works of art by painters, sculptors, graphic artists, theater and cinema professionals, masters of arts and crafts. At whole the Exhibition attended over 350 artists of the Leningrad.

== Contributing Artists ==
In the largest Department of Painting there were exhibited art works of 177 authors. These were Piotr Alberti, Evgenia Antipova, Taisia Afonina, Sergei Babkov, Vsevolod Bazhenov, Yuri Belov, Dmitry Belyaev, Olga Bogaevskaya, Nikolai Brandt, Dmitry Buchkin, Vladimir Gavrilov, Irina Getmanskaya, Vasily Golubev, Irina Dobrekova, Oleg Eremeev, Maria Kleschar-Samokhvalova, Maya Kopitseva, Alexander Koroviakov, Victor Korovin, Mikhail Kozell, Engels Kozlov, Elena Kostenko, Gevork Kotiantz, Vladimir Krantz, Valeria Larina, Boris Lavrenko, Ivan Lavsky, Anatoli Levitin, Oleg Lomakin, Dmitry Maevsky, Gavriil Malish, Boris Maluev, Valentina Monakhova, Nikolai Mukho, Vera Nazina, Mikhail Natarevich, Anatoli Nenartovich, Dmitry Oboznenko, Lev Orekhov, Victor Oreshnikov, Sergei Osipov, Victor Otiev, Yuri Pavlov, Genrikh Pavlovsky, Boris Petrov, Nikolai Pozdneev, Valentina Rakhina, Semion Rotnitsky, Maria Rudnitskaya, Ivan Savenko, Vladimir Sakson, Alexander Semionov, Arseny Semionov, Boris Shamanov, Alexander Shmidt, Nadezhda Shteinmiller, Elena Skuin, Kim Slavin, Alexander Stolbov, Victor Teterin, Nikolai Timkov, Yuri Tulin, Vitaly Tulenev, Boris Ugarov, Ivan Varichev, Anatoli Vasiliev, Igor Veselkin, Rostislav Vovkushevsky, Lazar Yazgur, German Yegoshin, Vecheslav Zagonek, Ruben Zakharian, Elena Zhukova, and other prominent painters of the Leningrad School of Painting.

In the Department of Sculptures it was exhibited the art works of 41 sculptors. The Department of graphics presented a creation of 86 artists.

== Contributed Artworks ==
For the Exhibition it was selected the art works that had been created during 1964–1965, together with some earlier works. All of them were exhibited for the first time. Some of them were subsequently found in the collections of Soviet Art museums, as well as the domestic and foreign galleries and collectors.

Portrait was presented of "Girl in the garden" by Evgenia Antipova, "Eva Ivanova" by Sergei Babkov, "Portrait of Dmitri Shostakovich" by Yuri Belov, "Female portrait" by Olga Bogaevskaya, "Girl with flower" by Maria Kleschar-Samokhvalova, "Kirill Genidze" by Elena Kostenko, "Mashenka. Portrait of daughter" by Engels Kozlov, "Portrait of teacher Lev Uspensky" by Valeria Larina, "Portrait of worker Sayanov", "Portrait of artist Kazanchan", "Portrait of Balashov, Hero of the Soviet Union", "Portrait of artist Leonid Baykov" by Anatoli Levitin, "At Reading", "Kolya, young railwayman" by Dmitry Maevsky, "Katya", "Artist Ivan Varichev", "Artist Yacob Golubev" by Oleg Lomakin, "Portrait of Sasha Akhalin" by Vera Nazina, "Tractor driver" by Genrikh Pavlovsky, "Portrait of wife", "Portrait of journalist Guriev" by Victor Oreshnikov, "Portrait of N. Murina", "Portrait of artist Piotr Buchkin" by Semion Rotnitsky, "Tamara" by Vladimir Sakson, "Girl with a branch of Pussy Willow" by Boris Shamanov, "Portrait of son and daughter" by Rostislav Vovkushevsky, "A Boy in Red Jacket" by German Yegoshin, and others.

Genre painting was presented of "Children" by Piotr Alberti, "Before entering the stage" by Sergei Babkov, "In the Motning" by Oleg Eremeev, "Sunday at the Volkhov River", "Courtyard" by Boris Lavrenko, "At the house" by Oleg Lomakin, "Rain", "Sundy Day", "Boys", "On the Volga River" by Boris Maluev, "Young mothers" by Mikhail Natarevich, "Old woman at the stove" by Yuri Pavlov, "On the farm" by Ivan Savenko, "Overhaul" by Nadezhda Shteinmiller, "On the pier" by Boris Ugarov, "Lights of new buildings" by Igor Veselkin, "On the outskirts of Novgorod" by Rostislav Vovkushevsky, "On the threshing-floor" by Ruben Zakharian, "A Midday on the Neva River" by Elena Zhukova, and others.

Still Life with Pussy-Willows. 1964

Landscape, Seascape and Cityscape were presented of "Spring in the forest", "Early green", "Winter sketch" by Vsevolod Bazhenov, "Saint George Church on the Volkhov River", "Old Ladoga", "A Spring" by Dmitry Belyaev, "The Last Snow", "Small Creek", "Saint George Church on the Volkhov"by Nikolai Brandt, "Izborsk ancient town", "Fishermen boats" by Dmitry Buchkin, "Off the coast of Antarctica" by Vladimir Gavrilov, "Forest river", "Creek", "Spring time", "Troubled Volkhov", "In the village" by Vasily Golubev, "At the walls of the Saint Piotr and Paul Fortress", "Winter Palace", "A Winter", by Alexander Koroviakov, "Spring Garden", "Ice drift", "Spring puddle", "Spring road" Victor Korovin, "Spring day", "Settlement of Dachnoe" by Mikhail Kozell, "Birches", "On plein air", "On the Volkhov River" by Vladimir Krantz, "Bukhara", "Old Ladoga" by Boris Lavrenko, "Soon Fall", "Imandra", "Over Khibiny" by Ivan Lavsky, "Frosty Day" by Dmitry Maevsky, "Pskov", "Southern landscape" by Gavriil Malish, "Sredny Prospekt of Vasilyevsky Island" by Nikolai Mukho, "A March", "April" by Mikhail Natarevich, "Birches", "Sunny" by Anatoli Nenartovich, "A March", "Grey Day" by Dmitry Oboznenko, "Vineyards" by Lev Orekhov, "Truvor's settlement", "Fortress Tower", "Autumn. Haystack", "Houses", "Fortress in Ancient Izborsk" by Sergei Osipov, "Arable land", "Creek" by Victor Otiev, "Mount Elbrus" by Boris Petrov, "Falling Leaves", "Thaw", "Bullfinches" by Nikolai Pozdneev, "Griboyedov Canal" by Valentina Rakhina, "Ancient Kholuy" by Semion Rotnitsky, "Fishermen boats" by Maria Rudnitskaya, "Pavlovsk town", "Pushkin town" by Alexander Semionov, "Landscape", "Cityscape of Tallinn", "Old Ladoga" by Arseny Semionov, "Old Garden in Yasnaya Polyana" by Alexander Shmidt, "Sergiyev Posad", "Settlement" by Nadezhda Shteinmiller, "Subcarpathian spring", "Truskavets" by Kim Slavin, "A Porch", "At the house" by Alexander Stolbov, "In Spring", "A Road", "A Winter", "In March", "A Fall time" by Nikolai Timkov, "Kamenny Island in Leningrad", "At the Lanskaya railway station" by Yuri Tulin, "Spring carpet" by Vitaly Tulenev, "The end of April" by Boris Ugarov, "Volkhov River", "Courtyard", "March Snow", "A Village of Bybino", "A Village of Izvoz" by Ivan Varichev, "Valley of Selenga River", "Settlement of Listvenichny" by Anatoli Vasiliev, "Spring on the Volkhov River", "Relict of the past in Old Ladoga" by Lazar Yazgur, "Landscape. Losevo village" by German Yegoshin, "Spring", "Bird cherry in the snow", "Meltwater", "Ice has passed", "Volkhov. North wind", "Thaw" by Vecheslav Zagonek, "Armenia" by Ruben Zakharian, "Spring garden", "Early Spring", "On the Bay", "First spring days", "Young apple-tree in autumn" by Elena Zhukova, and others.

Still life paintings were presented of "Still life with Pussy-Willows", "Rosehip" by Taisia Afonina, "Early Breakfast" by Evgenia Antipova, "Still life with Red Tray", "Jasmine", "Still Life with a Mandolin" by Olga Bogaevskaya, "Still life", "Oranges" by Irina Dobrekova-Chegorovskaya, "Still life" by Maria Kleschar-Samokhvalova, "Apples and pomegranate", "Oranges and lemons", "Bananas" by Maya Kopitseva, "Brearfast", "Still life", "Meat. Still life" by Gevork Kotiantz, "Still life with herring" by Engels Kozlov, "Russian victuals. Still life", "Breakfast in the field" by Genrikh Pavlovsky, "Still life", "Shelf", "Cucumbers in a sieve" by Nikolai Pozdneev, "Still life with Coffee pot", "Still life" by Valentina Rakhina, "Antonovsky apples", "Mushrooms" by Maria Rudnitskaya, "Sea fish", "Still life", "Fish-Needle" by Vladimir Sakson, "Violets", "Begonia", "Watering can and roses" by Elena Skuin, "Still life with cucumbers" by Boris Shamanov, "In the Garden. Still life" by Victor Teterin, "Dinner" by Rostislav Vovkushevsky, "A Fish" by German Yegoshin, and others.

== Acknowledgment ==
The Spring Exhibition of Leningrad artists of 1965 was widely covered by the press and in the literature on Soviet fine art.

== See also ==
- Fine Art of Leningrad
- Leningrad School of Painting
- 1965 in fine arts of the Soviet Union
- Saint Petersburg Union of Artists
- Socialist realism

== Sources ==
- Никифоровская И. У художников весна // Ленинградская правда, 1965, 19 июня.
- Каталог весенней выставки произведений ленинградских художников 1965 года. Л., Художник РСФСР, 1970.
- Справочник членов Ленинградской организации Союза художников РСФСР. Л., Художник РСФСР, 1980.
- Художники народов СССР. Биобиблиографический словарь. Т.1-4. М., Искусство, 1970–1995.
- Справочник членов Союза художников СССР. Т.1-2. М., Советский художник, 1979.
- Хроника узловых событий художественной жизни России 1960-1980-х годов // Time for Change. The Art of 1960–1985 in the Soviet Union. Saint Petersburg, State Russian Museum, 2006.
- Sergei V. Ivanov. Unknown Socialist Realism. The Leningrad School. Saint Petersburg, NP-Print Edition, 2007. P.395, 417, 442. ISBN 5-901724-21-6, ISBN 978-5-901724-21-7
- Юбилейный Справочник выпускников Санкт-Петербургского академического института живописи, скульптуры и архитектуры имени И. Е. Репина Российской Академии художеств. 1915—2005. Санкт Петербург, «Первоцвет», 2007.
