= Aleksandr Matveyev =

Aleksandr Matveyev or Matveev may refer to:

- Aleksandr Matveyev (artist) (1926—2008), Russian theater artist, painter, professor, and lighting specialist
- Aleksandr Matveyev (linguist) (1926–2010), Russian linguist
- Alexander Matveev (rower), competitor in rowing at the 2020 Summer Olympics
- Aleksandr Matveyev (sculptor) (1878–1960), Russian sculptor
