= Genrikh Pavlovsky =

Russian artist (1907 – 1973)

Genrikh Vasilievich Pavlovsky
- Born: October 15, 1907; Kamenskoe, Russian Empire
- Died: December 17, 1973 (aged 66); Leningrad, USSR
- Education: Repin Institute of Arts
- Known for: Painting, Teaching
- Movement: Realism

A Little Bit of Everything…. (1930) Genrikh Pavlovsky

Genrikh Vasilievich Pavlovsky (Russian: Павловский Генрих Васильевич) (October 15, 1907 – December 17, 1973) was a Russian and Soviet painter and art educator, who lived and worked in Leningrad, a member of the Leningrad Union of Artists, who played an important role in the formation of the Leningrad school of painting.

== Biography ==
Genrikh Vasilievich Pavlovsky was born on October 15, 1907, in the village of Kamenskoe. In 1910 his family moved to the small town of Novo-Borisov. In 1929 Pavlovsky graduated from Vitebsk Art School and was sent to continue his studies in Leningrad Academy of Arts. In 1937 Pavkovsky graduated from the Academy of Arts in Alexander Osmerkin studio as an artist of painting. His graduate work was a historical painting named «A Year of 1905». In the same year the painting was acquired by the State Russian Museum, which is a rare opportunity for graduate work.

At the first time Pavlovsky participated in Art Exhibition in 1931 year. Since 1937 he was constantly involved in Art Exhibitions, showing his work together with the leading masters of fine arts of Leningrad. He painted genre and historical paintings, portraits, landscapes, and still lifes. In 1937 Pavlovsky become a member of the Leningrad Union of the Soviet Artists. Also in 1937 he began teaching at the Repin Institute as an assistant in the studio of Alexander Osmerkin, where he work up to the 1950. From 1950 to 1973 Pavlovsky teaching at the Vera Mukhina Industrial Art School in Leningrad.

== Pupils ==
- Evgenia Antipova
- Nikolai Baskakov
- Evgenia Baykova
- Dmitry Belyaev
- Olga Bogaevskaya
- Vladimir Chekalov
- Ivan Godlevsky
- Abram Grushko
- Boris Kharchenko
- Alexander Koroviakov
- Marina Kozlovskaya
- Alexei Mozhaev
- Nikolai Mukho
- Lev Orekhov
- Sergei Osipov
- Gleb Savinov
- Elena Skuin
- Victor Teterin
- Yuri Tulin
- Nina Veselova
- Vecheslav Zagonek
- and a lot of others.

== See also ==
- Leningrad School of Painting
- List of 20th-century Russian painters
- List of painters of Saint Petersburg Union of Artists
- Saint Petersburg Union of Artists

== Sources ==
- Выставка произведений ленинградских художников. 1947 год. Живопись. Скульптура. Графика. Театрально-декорационная живопись. Каталог. Л., ЛССХ, 1948.
- Бойков В. Изобразительное искусство Ленинграда. Заметки о выставке ленинградских художников // Ленинградская правда, 1947, 29 ноября.
- Выставка произведений ленинградских художников 1951 года. Каталог. Л., ЛССХ, 1951. C.16.
- Весенняя выставка произведений ленинградских художников 1955 года. Каталог. Л., ЛССХ, 1956. C.14.
- Осенняя выставка произведений ленинградских художников. 1956 года. Каталог. Л., Ленинградский художник, 1958. C.18.
- 1917 — 1957. Выставка произведений ленинградских художников. Каталог. Л., Ленинградский художник, 1958. C.24.
- Бродский В. Жизнеутверждающее искусство // Ленинградская правда, 1957, 11 октября.
- Двести лет Академии художеств СССР. Каталог выставки. — Л.-М.: Искусство, 1958. — с.147.
- Осенняя выставка произведений ленинградских художников 1958 года. Каталог. Л., Художник РСФСР, 1959. C.20.
- Выставка произведений ленинградских художников 1960 года. Каталог. Л., Художник РСФСР, 1961. C.30-31.
- Выставка произведений ленинградских художников 1961 года. Каталог. Л., Художник РСФСР, 1964. C.30.
- Осенняя выставка произведений ленинградских художников 1962 года. Каталог. Л., Художник РСФСР, 1962. C.20.
- Ленинград. Зональная выставка. Л., Художник РСФСР, 1965. C.39.
- Каталог весенней выставки произведений ленинградских художников 1965 года. Л., Художник РСФСР, 1970. C.23.
- Третья республиканская художественная выставка «Советская Россия». Каталог. М., Министерство культуры РСФСР, 1967. C.42.
- Осенняя выставка произведений ленинградских художников 1968 года. Каталог. Л., Художник РСФСР, 1971. C.13.
- Весенняя выставка произведений ленинградских художников 1969 года. Каталог. Л., Художник РСФСР, 1970. C.15.
- Шишло Б. Что вдохновляло художников. Размышления в связи с осенней выставкой. // Смена, 1971, 7 января.
- Наш современник. Вторая выставка произведений ленинградских художников 1972 года. Каталог. Л., Художник РСФСР, 1973. C.9.
- По родной стране. Выставка произведений художников Ленинграда. 50 Летию образования СССР посвящается. Каталог. Л., Художник РСФСР, 1974. C.20.
- Натюрморт. Выставка произведений ленинградских художников 1973 года. Л., Художник РСФСР, 1973. C.11.
- Весенняя выставка произведений ленинградских художников. Каталог. Л., Художник РСФСР, 1974. C.9.
- Наш современник. Зональная выставка произведений ленинградских художников 1975 года. Каталог. Л., Художник РСФСР, 1980. C.21.
- Изобразительное искусство Ленинграда. Каталог выставки. — Л: Художник РСФСР, 1976. — с.25.
- Генрих Васильевич Павловский. Выставка произведений. Каталог. — Л: Художник РСФСР, 1980.
- Sergei V. Ivanov. Unknown Socialist Realism. The Leningrad School. Saint Petersburg, NP-Print Edition, 2007. P.391, 400. ISBN 5-901724-21-6, ISBN 978-5-901724-21-7.
- Юбилейный Справочник выпускников Санкт-Петербургского академического института живописи, скульптуры и архитектуры имени И. Е. Репина Российской Академии художеств. 1915—2005. — Санкт Петербург: «Первоцвет», 2007. — с.77.
- Романычева И. Г. Академическая дача. История и традиции. — Санкт-Петербург: Петрополь, 2009. — с.148.
- Традиции школы живописи государственной художественно-промышленной академии имени А. Л. Штиглица. Кафедра общей живописи. — СПб., 2010. С. 15, 271.
- Санкт-Петербургская государственная художественно-промышленная академия им. А. Л. Штиглица. Кафедра монументально-декоративной живописи. — СПб., Искусство России. 2011. С. 64.
