= Matveyev =

Matveyev (Russian: Матвеев; masculine) or Matveyeva (Матвеева; feminine) is a Russian language family name. Its alternative spellings include Matveev. The name is derived from the male given name Matvey and literally means Matvey's. It may refer to:

- Aleksandr Matveyev (disambiguation)
  - Aleksandr Matveyev (linguist) (1926–2010), Russian linguist
  - Aleksandr Matveyev (officer) (1922–?), Soviet army officer and Full Cavalier of the Order of Glory
  - Aleksandr Matveyev (sculptor) (1878–1960), Russian sculptor
- Aleksey Matveyev (born 1970), Russian swimmer
- Andrey Matveyev (1666–1728), Russian statesman
- Andrey Matveyev (painter) (1702–1739), Russian painter
- Artamon Matveyev (1625–1682), Russian statesman, diplomat and reformer
- Boris Matveyev (footballer) (born 1970), Soviet and Russian footballer
- Fyodor Matveyev (1758–1826), Russian painter and graphic artist
- Ivan Matveyev (1914–1984), Soviet sailor (1952 Summer Olympics and the 1956 Summer Olympics)
- Kyrylo Matveyev (born 1996), Ukrainian footballer
- Mikhail Matveyev (1914–1944), Soviet aircraft pilot and Hero of the Soviet Union
- Oleh Matveyev (born 1970), Russian-born Ukrainian footballer
- Novella Matveyeva (1934–2016), Russian bard
- Pavel Matveyev (born 1980), Russian artist
- Svetlana Matveeva (born 1969), Russian chess player
- Tatiana Matveyeva (born 1985), Russian weightlifter
- Tatiana Matveeva (footballer), Georgian football player
- Vladimir Matveyev (1911–1942), Soviet aircraft pilot and Hero of the Soviet Union
- Yevgeny Matveyev (1922–2003), Soviet and Russian actor, film director and screenwriter

== See also ==
- Matveev Kurgan, a rural locality (a settlement) in Rostov Oblast, Russia
