= Sergei Babkov =

Sergei Babkov may refer to

- Sergei Babkov (basketball) (1967–2023), Russian basketball player
- Sergei Babkov (painter) (1920–1993), Soviet Russian painter
