= Matvejev =

Matvejev is an surname of Russian origin. Notable people with the surname include:

- Akim Matvejev (born 2006), Estonian professional rugby league footballer
- Nikolai Matvejev (1923–1984), Soviet cyclist

== See also ==
- Matveyev, Russian surname
