= The Fourth Zonal Exhibition of Leningrad artists of 1972 =

1972 Soviet art exhibition

The Fourth Zonal Exhibition of Leningrad artists of 1972. Catalog
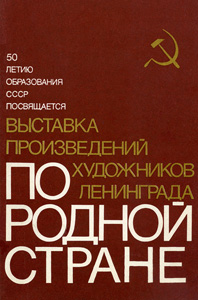
- Year: 1972
- Location: State Russian Museum, Leningrad Union of Soviet Artists Exhibition Halls; Leningrad

The Fourth Zonal Exhibition of Leningrad artists of 1972 dedicated to 50th Anniversary of USSR (Russian: "Четвёртая зональная выставка произведений ленинградских художников 1972 года, посвящённая 50-летию образования СССР") was opened on September 22, in the State Russian Museum as well as in Exhibition Halls of the Leningrad Union of Soviet Artists and become one of largest Art Exhibition of 1972 in the USSR.

== History and Organization ==
For the organization and preparation of Exhibition was formed Exhibition Committee in consist of 42 authoritative art-experts. Exhibition Catalog was published. At whole Exhibition attended over 400 artists of the Leningrad.

== Contributing Artists ==
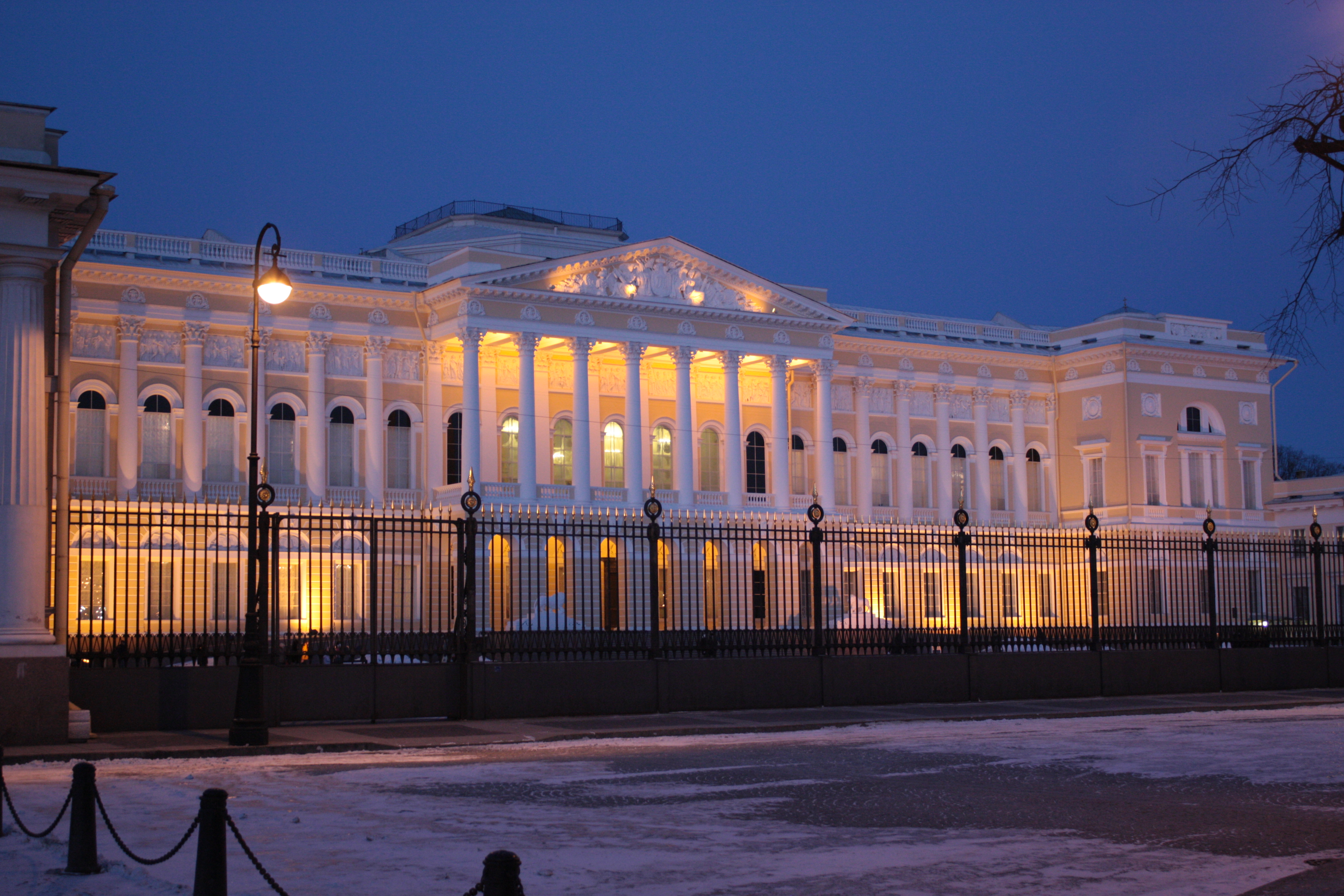
State Russian Museum

In the largest Department of Painting were exhibited art works of 142 authors. There were Evgenia Antipova, Nikolai Baskakov, Olga Bogaevskaya, Nikolai Brandt, Sergei Frolov, Nikolai Galakhov, Vasily Golubev, Tatiana Gorb, Vladimir Gorb, Irina Dobrekova, Mikhail Kaneev, Mikhail Kozell, Marina Kozlovskaya, Engels Kozlov, Maya Kopitseva, Boris Korneev, Elena Kostenko, Nikolai Kostrov, Gevork Kotiantz, Yaroslav Krestovsky, Ivan Lavsky, Anatoli Levitin, Oleg Lomakin, Dmitry Maevsky, Gavriil Malish, Eugene Maltsev, Boris Maluev, Yuri Mezhirov, Evsey Moiseenko, Andrei Mylnikov, Piotr Nazarov, Samuil Nevelshtein, Dmitry Oboznenko, Sergei Osipov, Filaret Pakun, Genrikh Pavlovsky, Nikolai Pozdneev, Stepan Privedentsev, Valentina Rakhina, Semion Rotnitsky, Ivan Savenko, Gleb Savinov, Vladimir Sakson, Arseny Semionov, Joseph Serebriany, Kim Slavin, Alexander Shmidt, Alexander Sokolov, German Tatarinov, Victor Teterin, Nikolai Timkov, Mikhail Trufanov, Yuri Tulin, Vitaly Tulenev, Boris Ugarov, Ivan Varichev, Igor Veselkin, Valery Vatenin, Vecheslav Zagonek, Elena Zhukova, and others painters of the Leningrad School.

In the Department of Sculptures were exhibited art works of 68 sculptors. Department of graphics presented a creation of 110 artists.

== Contributed Artworks ==
For exposure have been selected art works created in 1971–1972, as well as some earlier works. All they were exhibited in the first time. Some of them were subsequently found in the collections of leading Soviet Art museums, as well as domestic and foreign galleries and collectors. In exposition were presented all genres of contemporary painting: portrait, historical and genre scenes, landscape and cityscape, still life.

Historical genre was presented of "Great Battle of Kursk. Counteroffensive to Belgorod" by Yaroslav Krestovsky, "Stalingrad Battle" by Boris Maluev, "Victory" by Evsey Moiseenko, "A Victory!" by Dmitry Oboznenko, "Lenin!" by Alexander Sokolov, "The Land" by Boris Ugarov, and some others.

Portrait painting was represented of "Girl and Sunflowers" by Irina Dobrekova, "Postman" by Gevork Kotiantz, "Portrait of firefighter Gavrilov", "Portrait of firefighter Medvedev" by Anatoli Levitin, "Master of sports Nikolai Kolobov", "Chemist Lubov Timofeeva" by Oleg Lomakin, "Farm worker Ivan Nosov" by Dmitry Maevsky, "The Sons" Yuri Mezhirov, "Galina" by Samuil Nevelshtein, "Art critic Zemtsova" by Semion Rotnitsky, "Sviatoslav Richter" by Joseph Serebriany, "Portrait of student" by Boris Ugarov, "Portrait of a lawyer Markova" by Igor Veselkin, and some others.

Genre painting was represented of "Steelmakers", "At the Kirov Plant" by Nikolai Baskakov, "At the country cottage" by Olga Bogaevskaya, "Swallows" by Nikolai Brandt, "Karelia. The northern edge" by Nikolai Galakhov, "Balkhar dance" by Eugene Maltsev, "Tourists" by Evsey Moiseenko, "The Morning" by Andrei Mylnikov, "The Leningrad Subway" by Semion Rotnitsky, "Interior of Art Studio", "Sleeping woman" by Gleb Savinov, "Art studio in the night" by Vladimir Sakson, "Early spring. The repair of dam" by Nikolai Timkov, "Mainers of Northern Ural", "Pier", "A Beach", "Swimmers" by Mikhail Trufanov, "Street of my childhood" by Vitaly Tulenev, "Mother of soldier" by Valery Vatenin, "Youth" by Vecheslav Zagonek, and some others.

Landscape and Cityscape were represented of "The Grape Arbor" by Evgenia Antipova, "Boats" by Nikolai Brandt, "At the Forest Edge" by Sergei Frolov, "Golden Russia" by Vasily Golubev, "Karelia. Creek in the winter" by Vladimir Gorb, "Volkhov River at the Staraya Ladoga", "Summer in Kirishi" by Ivan Lavsky, "Donetsk. Waste heaps", "The Beginning of Autumn" by Gavriil Malish, "Summer", "Silence" by Evsey Moiseenko, "Spring" by Andrei Mylnikov, "Spring" by Piotr Nazarov, "Last snow" by Samuil Nevelshtein, "Evening in the forest", "Spring", "Spring day" by Dmitry Oboznenko, "A River", "A Spring Morning" by Sergei Osipov, "Dnieper River" by Filaret Pakun, "Houses" by Nikolai Pozdneev, "Russian flax" by Ivan Savenko, "Veranda" by Gleb Savinov, "Early morning in Yalta" by Arseny Semionov, "Spring" by Kim Slavin, "Tatar homes" by Alexander Shmidt, "February" by Alexander Sokolov, "Snow was fell" by German Tatarinov, "Olive grove" by Victor Teterin, "Winter cityscape", "A May. Blooming Bird Cherry" by Nikolai Timkov, "Baykal Lake", "Windy day" by Yuri Tulin, "Defoliation" by Boris Ugarov, "Spring", "Street in Staraya Ladoga" by Ivan Varichev, "Yenisei River. Before the storm" by Vecheslav Zagonek, "Forest Lake", "The spring wealth", "Spring near the Leningrad. Snowdrops" by Elena Zhukova, and some others.

Still-life paintings were presented of "Tulips on the window" by Evgenia Antipova, "Roses", "Still life with Flowers", "Still life with tray" by Olga Bogaevskaya, "White Lilac" by Nikolai Brandt, "Still life" by Gevork Kotiantz, "Still life with Grapes" by Gavriil Malish, "Calla Lilies" by Evsey Moiseenko, "Still life" by Andrei Mylnikov, "Autumn Bouquet" by Samuil Nevelshtein, "Still life with Balalayka" by Sergei Osipov, "Still life with fish", "A new table", "Bread" by Genrikh Pavlovsky, "Balcony. Rosehip fruits", "Cactuses and Lemons", "Calla Lilies" by Valentina Rakhina, "Bananas" by Vladimir Sakson, "Still life with Teapot" by Arseny Semionov, "Branches of Bird Cherry" by Kim Slavin, "Still life with fish" by Alexander Sokolov, "Still life with Rose" by Victor Teterin, and some others.

== Acknowledgment ==
The Fourth Zonal Exhibition of Leningrad artists of 1972 was widely covered in press and in literature on Soviet fine art.

== See also ==
- Fine Art of Leningrad
- Soviet art
- 1972 in fine arts of the Soviet Union
- Leningrad School of Painting
- Saint Petersburg Union of Artists
- Socialist realism

== Sources ==
- Колесова О. Широка страна моя … Творческий отчёт ленинградских художников, посвящённый 50-летию образования СССР // Ленинградская правда, 1972, 23 сентября.
- Богданов А. Славя страну труда // Вечерний Ленинград, 1972, 10 октября.
- Арбузов Г. С мыслью о родине // Ленинградская правда, 1972, 10 октября.
- Выставка произведений художников Ленинграда «По родной стране». Каталог. Л., Художник РСФСР, 1974.
- Справочник членов Ленинградской организации Союза художников РСФСР. Л., Художник РСФСР, 1980.
- Художники народов СССР. Биобиблиографический словарь. Т.1-4. М., Искусство, 1970–1995.
- Справочник членов Союза художников СССР. Т.1-2. М., Советский художник, 1979.
- Хроника узловых событий художественной жизни России 1960-1980-х годов // Time for Change. The Art of 1960–1985 in the Soviet Union. Saint Petersburg, State Russian Museum, 2006. P.377.
- Sergei V. Ivanov. Unknown Socialist Realism. The Leningrad School. Saint Petersburg, NP-Print Edition, 2007. P.395, 417, 442. ISBN 5-901724-21-6, ISBN 978-5-901724-21-7
- Юбилейный Справочник выпускников Санкт-Петербургского академического института живописи, скульптуры и архитектуры имени И. Е. Репина Российской Академии художеств. 1915—2005. Санкт Петербург, «Первоцвет», 2007.
