= Midday (painting) =

1982 painting by Evgenia Antipova

- Artist: Evgenia P. Antipova
- Year: 1982
- Medium: Oil on canvas
- Dimensions: 100 cm × 120 cm (40 in × 48 in)
- Location: private collection

Midday is a 1982 painting by Evgenia Antipova, a Russian painter and graphic artist renowned for her landscape and still life paintings. Antipova was a member of the Saint Petersburg Union of Artists (until 1992 the Leningrad Union of Artists). She lived and worked in Saint Petersburg (formerly Leningrad) and is regarded as a member of the Leningrad School of Painting.

== History ==
Created in 1982, the painting depicts the summer garden at a dacha in Berngardovka, near Leningrad, the location of Antipova's main workshop during the years 1980–2000.

According to art historian Leo Mochalov, the image created in the painting can be considered as a "model of the world, which is perceived by the artist as a precious gift, like our own existence, inseparable from this world".

The first time the painting was shown was in 1988, during an exhibition at the Leningrad Union of Artists. It was shown again in 1989 at an exhibition of 26 Moscow and Leningrad artists. In 1999, the painting was shown a third time in the Central Exhibition Hall of Manezh, located in Saint Petersburg at the common exhibition of Evgenia Antipova and Victor Teterin. The painting was described and reproduced in the exhibition catalogue.

== See also ==
- List of Russian artists
- List of 20th-century Russian painters
- List of painters of Saint Petersburg Union of Artists

== Bibliography ==
- Художники народов СССР. Биобиблиографический словарь. Т.1. М., Искусство, 1970. С.165.
- Каталог выставки одиннадцати ленинградских художников. Л., Художник РСФСР, 1976. С.15.
- Справочник членов Ленинградской организации Союза художников РСФСР. Л., Художник РСФСР, 1987. С.7.
- Выставка произведений 26 ленинградских и московских художников. Каталог. Л., Художник РСФСР, 1990. С.47.
- Евгения Антипова, Виктор Тетерин. Живопись. Рисунок. Санкт-Петербург, ЗАО «ПОНИ», 1999. С.12, 22.
