= Evgenia Baykova =

Russian artist (1907–1997)

Evgenia Vasilievna Baykova
- Born: November 22, 1907; Saint Petersburg, Russian Empire
- Died: 1997 (aged 89–90); Saint Petersburg, Russian Federation
- Education: Repin Institute of Arts
- Known for: Painting, Graphics
- Movement: Realism

Evgenia Vasilievna Baykova (Russian: Евге́ния Васи́льевна Байко́ва; November 22, 1907 – 1997) was a Russian Soviet realist painter and graphic artist, who lived and worked in Saint Petersburg (formerly Leningrad). She was a member of the Saint Petersburg Union of Artists (known before 1992 as the Leningrad branch of Union of Artists of Russian Federation), regarded as one of representatives of the Leningrad School of Painting.

== Biography ==
Evgenia Vasilievna Baykova was born November 22, 1907, in Saint-Petersburg, Russian Empire.

In 1934, Evgenia Baykova entered at the Department of Painting of the Leningrad Institute of Painting, Sculpture and Architecture. There she studied under notable art educators, Boris Fogel, Mikhail Bernshtein, Semion Abugov, Pavel Naumov, and Genrikh Pavlovsky.

In 1940, Evgenia Baykova graduated from the Leningrad Institute of Painting, Sculpture and Architecture as artist of painting in Alexander Osmerkin workshop, together with Olga Bogaevskaya, Alexander Dashkevich, Mikhail Natarevich, Maria Perepelkina, Gleb Savinov, and other young artists. Her graduated work was the genre painting The first news of the transfer of land to the peasants, dedicated to the first decrees of Bolsheviks.

Since 1940, Eugenia Baykova has participated in art exhibitions. She painted genre scenes, portraits, still lifes, and landscapes. Her personal exhibition was in Leningrad in 1983.

Evgenia Baykova was a member of the Saint Petersburg Union of Artists (known before 1992 as the Leningrad branch of Union of Artists of Russian Federation) since 1944.

Eugenia Vasilievna Baykova died in Saint Petersburg in 1997. Paintings by Evgenia Baykova reside in art museums and private collections in the Russia, Italy, France, in the U.S., England, and others.

== Bibliography ==
- Artists of the USSR. Biography Dictionary. Volume 1. - Moscow: Iskusstvo Edition, 1970. - p. 261.
- Sergei V. Ivanov. Unknown Socialist Realism. The Leningrad School. Saint Petersburg: NP-Print Edition, 2007. P. 9, 15, 26, 28, 315, 356, 387–389, 392, 397, 398, 402, 403, 405, 406, 413, 414, 416, 418–421, 423, 444. ISBN 5-901724-21-6, ISBN 978-5-901724-21-7.
