= Nevsky Prospekt (painting) =

Painting by Gleb Savinov

- Artist: Gleb A. Savinov
- Year: 1984
- Medium: Oil on canvas
- Dimensions: 100 cm × 73 cm (40 in × 29 in)
- Location: private collection

Nevsky Prospekt is a cityscape painting by Gleb Savinov (Russian: Глеб Александрович Савинов; 1915–2000), Russian painter regarded as one of the leading representatives of the Leningrad School of Painting, most known for his genre and portrait painting. The cityscape depicts the life of the main street of Leningrad on a summer day of the mid-1980s.

== History ==
This painting continued a lyrical series of works devoted to Leningrad, which Savinov began thirty years earlier. Savinov was attracted to the problems of showing people and objects in their environment. Nevsky Prospect has always been a sensitive barometer of the state of society. This painting truthfully and somewhat ironically show the atmosphere of anticipation and a lively crowd, which are specific not only for this part of the Nevsky Prospect before exit the Palace Square, but also for the mid-1980s in general.

In 1991 Nevsky Prospekt was shown in Savonov's solo exhibition at the Leningrad Union of Artists. In 1997 the painting was displayed at the art exhibition "Memory of Teacher", dedicated to creativity of the Leningrad artists, who studied in the Alexander Osmerkin art studio in the Repin Institute of Arts.

It was reproduced and described among 350 art works by Leningrad artists in the 2007 book Unknown Socialist Realism: The Leningrad School, published in Russian and English.

== Sources ==
- Справочник членов Ленинградской организации Союза художников РСФСР. Л., Художник РСФСР, 1987. С.114.
- Леонова Н. Глеб Александрович Савинов. Л., Художник РСФСР, 1988.
- Глеб Александрович Савинов. Выставка произведений. Каталог. Л., Художник РСФСР, 1991. С.14, 39.
- Памяти учителя. Выставка петербургских художников — учеников мастерской А. А. Осмёркина. СПб., 1997. С.4, 5.
