= Aleksandr Matveyev (linguist) =

Russian linguist

- Born: July 8, 1926; Yekaterinburg, Soviet Union
- Died: October 9, 2010 (aged 84); Yekaterinburg, Russia
- Occupation: linguist

Academic work
- Notable works: Dictionary of dialects of Northern Russia, Materials to a Dictionary of Finno-Ugric borrowings in the dialects of Northern Russia

Aleksandr Konstantinovich Matveyev (Russian: Александр Константинович Матвеев, July 8, 1926 – October 9, 2010) was a Russian linguist known for his works in toponymics (branch of linguistics studying toponyms), onomastics (studies of proper names), and etymology (origins and semantical development of words).

== Biography ==
Aleksandr Matveyev was born in Sverdlovsk but because of World War II he entered and graduated from the Khabarovsk University. Starting in 1952 he worked at the Ural State University in Sverdlovsk. In 1970 he defended his second thesis (Russian degree of doctor nauk) and became professor of the philological department. Since 1961 – chief of the chair of Russian language and general linguistics at the Ural State University. In 1988 he received the title of Scientist Emeritus of Russia. In 1991 he was elected a corresponding member of the Russian Academy of Sciences.

Being the chief of the annual dialectological and toponymical expeditions he contributed to the creation of a huge collection of toponyms of the Northern part of Russia. His study of this material revealed a great number of substrate phenomena from Uralic languages and extended our knowledge of the formal and semantical development of toponyms as well as of the ancient state of the Uralic languages. He is noted for his work in advancing Slavic etymology in both scholarly and popular domains.

He was also the head of a large group of linguists known as Ural school of onomastics.

== Main works ==
Aleksandr Matveyev is the author of several books including Finno-Ugric borrowings in Russian dialect of the Northern Urals (Sverdlovsk, 1959), Methods of toponymic researches (Sverdlovsk, 1986), Substrate toponymics of Northern Russia (vol. 1, 2, Yekaterinburg, 2001), the fundamental Onomatology (Moscow, 2006) and many popular books about language for non-linguists. Prof. A. Matveyev is the author of 270 publications. He was the editor-in-chief and member of editorial committees of several periodicals (including Questions of Onomastics, Toponymical investigations, Etymology) and dictionaries (Dictionary of Russian dialects of the Middle Urals, Dictionary of dialects of Northern Russia, Materials to a Dictionary of Finno-Ugric borrowings in the dialects of Northern Russia).
