= Aleksandr Matveyev (artist) =

Russian painter

Aleksandr Borisovich Matveyev
- Born: Aleksandr Borisovich Matveyev; Александр Борисович Матвеев; 26 January 1926
- Died: 22 January 2008 (aged 81)
- Occupations: painter, specialist in the field of architectural and theatrical lighting

Aleksandr Borisovich Matveyev (Russian: Александр Борисович Матвеев; 26 January 1926 — 22 January 2008) was a Russian theater artist, painter, professor and a specialist in the field of architectural and theatrical lighting.

== Biography ==
Aleksandr Borisovich Matveyev was born in the family of the famous Soviet zoologist Boris Stepanovich Matveev. After graduation from a secondary school, he at the same time enrolled into two universities: Moscow Power Engineering Institute (graduated in 1949) and Moscow Art Theater School at Staging faculty (graduated in 1950).

After graduation, he came to work in the Moscow Art Theater, but soon, in 1951, he was sent to work for the Central Academic Theater of the Soviet Army. During his time in this theater he took part in staging of more than twenty performances not only as an artist-director, but also as a lighting engineer. Among his performances "Do not Have a Penny but Suddenly Hit the Jackpot" (by Alexander Ostrovsky), "An Optimistic Tragedy" (by Vsevolod Vishnevskiy), "A Factory Girl" (by Aleksandr Volodin), "My Family" (by Eduardo De Filippo), and other plays. He also collaborated with other Soviet theaters.

Since the 1960s he started teaching. For many years he had read a course of lectures at the Moscow Power Engineering Institute.

Aleksandr Matveyev also showed himself as an outstanding landscape painter. He painted landscapes of European part of Russia, the Caucasus, the Crimea and many other places. He took part in many art exhibitions.

He died on 22 January 2008 and was buried at Kuntsevo Cemetery in Moscow.

== Literature ==
- Московская энциклопедия. Том 1: Лица Москвы. Книга 6: А-Я. Дополнения. — М.: ОАО «Московские учебники», 2014
