= Olga Bogaevskaya =

Russian painter

Olga Borisovna Bogaevskaya
- Born: 25 October 1915; Petrograd, Russian Empire
- Died: 30 November 2000 (aged 85); Saint Petersburg, Russia
- Education: Repin Institute of Arts
- Known for: Painting, graphics
- Movement: Realism

Olga Borisovna Bogaevskaya (Russian: О́льга Бори́совна Богае́вская; 25 October 1915 – 30 November 2000) was a Russian Soviet painter and graphic artist, who lived and worked in Saint Petersburg (formerly named Petrograd and Leningrad). She was a member of the Leningrad Union of Artists, regarded as one of the leading representatives of the Leningrad School of Painting.

== Biography ==
Bogaevskaya was born on 25 October 1915 in Petrograd in a family of scientists, archaeologists, and art historians. She studied at the Art and Industry College, where she was a student of Dmitry Zagoskin (1931–1932). She then continued her education at the Leningrad Institute of Painting, Sculpture and Architecture, where she was a student of Sergei Priselkov, Genrikh Pavlovsky, David Bernshtein, and Alexander Osmerkin (1933–1940). In 1940 Bogaevskaya graduated from the Institute of Painting, Sculpture and Architecture in the Alexander Osmerkin workshop with the rank of artist of painting. Her degree work was the painting Meting of Girlfriend.

In 1940 Bogaevskaya married a fellow student at the institute, artist Gleb Savinov. In 1940–1941, she taught painting at the Secondary Art School at the Leningrad Institute of Painting, Sculpture and Architecture. Bogaevskaya was a regular participant of exhibitions of Leningrad artists since the late 1940s. She was a talented colorist. The leading themes of her work were child portraits and still lifes in the interior and exterior. Beginning in 1940, Bogaevskaya was a member of the Leningrad Union of Soviet Artists. Her works of the 1950s and 1960s put her among the leading painters of Leningrad.

Among Bogaevskaya's most famous works are the paintings The Breakfast and Cadets (both 1947); Peaceful Sleep (1951); Still Life with Strawberries, Girls, and Flowers: Still Life (all 1956); In the Garden and Girl with Dolls (both 1957); Guests and Apples (both 1960); Still Life and Snowdrops (both 1961); Wedding (1967); Still Life with Tray and Roses (both 1972); Katia with the Doll and Still Life with a Bird (both 1976); Children's Holiday (1980); and A Spring (1990).

Bogaevskaya died on 30 November 2000 in Saint Petersburg at the age of eighty-six. Her paintings reside in the State Russian Museum in Saint Petersburg, in museums and private collections in Russia, Italy, Britain, France, in the U.S., Japan, and other countries.

== See also ==
- Leningrad School of Painting
- List of Russian artists
- List of 20th-century Russian painters
- List of painters of Saint Petersburg Union of Artists
- List of the Russian Landscape painters
- Saint Petersburg Union of Artists

== Bibliography ==
- Выставка произведений ленинградских художников 1951 года. Каталог. Л., Лениздат, 1951. С.8.
- Осенняя выставка произведений ленинградских художников 1956 года. Каталог. Л., Ленинградский художник, 1958. С.7.
- 1917 — 1957. Выставка произведений ленинградских художников. Каталог. Л., Ленинградский художник, 1958. С.9.
- Выставка произведений ленинградских художников 1960 года. Каталог. Л., Художник РСФСР, 1963. С.7.
- Выставка произведений ленинградских художников 1960 года. Каталог. Л., Художник РСФСР, 1961. С.10.
- Республиканская художественная выставка «Советская Россия». Каталог. М., Советский художник, 1960. С.17.
- Выставка произведений ленинградских художников 1961 года. Каталог. Л., Художник РСФСР, 1964. С.10.
- Ленинград. Зональная выставка 1964 года. Каталог. Л, Художник РСФСР, 1965. C.11.
- Каталог весенней выставки произведений ленинградских художников 1965 года. Л., Художник РСФСР, 1970. С.9.
- Вторая республиканская художественная выставка «Советская Россия». Каталог. М., Советский художник, 1965. С.12.
- Третья республиканская художественная выставка «Советская Россия». Каталог. М., Министерство культуры РСФСР, 1967. С.19.
- Наш современник. Каталог выставки произведений ленинградских художников 1971 года. Л., Художник РСФСР, 1972. С.9.
- По родной стране. Выставка произведений художников Ленинграда. 50-Летию образования СССР посвящается. Каталог. Л., Художник РСФСР, 1974. С.10.
- Наш современник. Зональная выставка произведений ленинградских художников 1975 года. Каталог. Л., Художник РСФСР, 1980. C.12.
- Изобразительное искусство Ленинграда. Каталог выставки. Л., Художник РСФСР, 1976. C.15.
- Выставка произведений ленинградских художников, посвящённая 60-летию Великого Октября. Л., Художник РСФСР, 1982. С.12.
- Зональная выставка произведений ленинградских художников 1980 года. Каталог. Л., Художник РСФСР, 1983. C.10.
- Directory of members of the Leningrad branch of Union of Artists of Russian Federation. Leningrad, Khudozhnik RSFSR, 1987. P.15.
- L' École de Leningrad. Auction Catalogue. Paris, Drouot Richelieu, 21 Decembre 1990. P.58-59.
- Olga Borisovna Bogaevskaya. Torino, Galleria PIRRA, 1996.
- Link of Times: 1932 - 1997. Artists - Members of Saint Petersburg Union of Artists of Russia. Exhibition catalogue. Saint Petersburg, Manezh Central Exhibition Hall, 1997. P.283-284.
- Matthew C. Bown. Dictionary of 20th Century Russian and Soviet Painters 1900-1980s. London, Izomar, 1998. ISBN 0-9532061-0-6, ISBN 978-0-9532061-0-0.
- Time for change. The Art of 1960-1985 in the Soviet Union. Saint Petersburg, State Russian Museum, 2006. P.170.
- Sergei V. Ivanov. Unknown Socialist Realism. The Leningrad School. Saint Petersburg, NP-Print Edition, 2007. P.9, 15, 20, 21, 24, 385, 387–393, 395, 397, 399–402, 405, 407, 439, 445. ISBN 5-901724-21-6, ISBN 978-5-901724-21-7.
- Anniversary Directory graduates of Saint Petersburg State Academic Institute of Painting, Sculpture, and Architecture named after Ilya Repin, Russian Academy of Arts. 1915 - 2005. Saint Petersburg, Pervotsvet Publishing House, 2007. P.43-46, 48. ISBN 978-5-903677-01-6.
