= Alexander Osmerkin =

Russian painter (1892–1953)

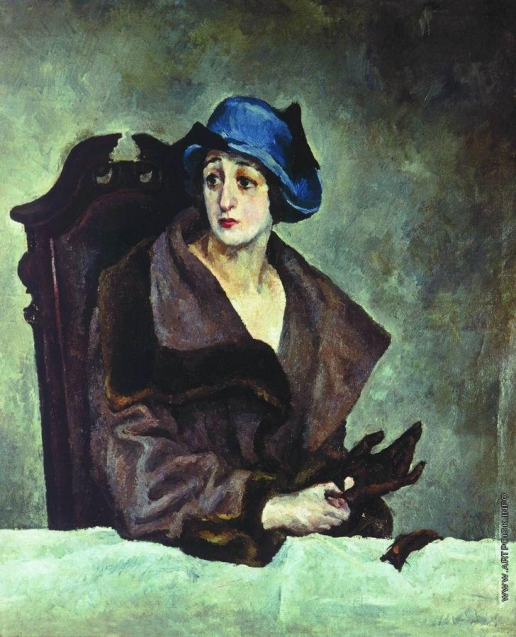
Portrait of a lady, 1910

Alexander Alexandrovich Osmerkin (Russian: Александр Александрович Осмеркин; 8 December [O.S. 26 November] 1892 – 25 June 1953) was a Russian painter, graphic artist, stage designer, and art teacher. He was a member of the Knave of Diamonds avant-garde group, AKhRR, and Society of Moscow Artists (OMKh) groups. Since 1932 he was a member of the Leningrad Union of Artists.

== Biography ==
=== Childhood ===
Alexander Osmerkin was born in Elisavetgrad (now Kropyvnytskyi, Ukraine) into the family of a post-office clerk. Young Osmerkin was raised by his Ukrainian nanny, who eventually stayed with him through the rest of his life as his personal assistant. He took his first art lessons at the drawing department at Elisavetgrad Regional Professional School under a Peredvizhnik painter Feodosy Kozachinskiy.

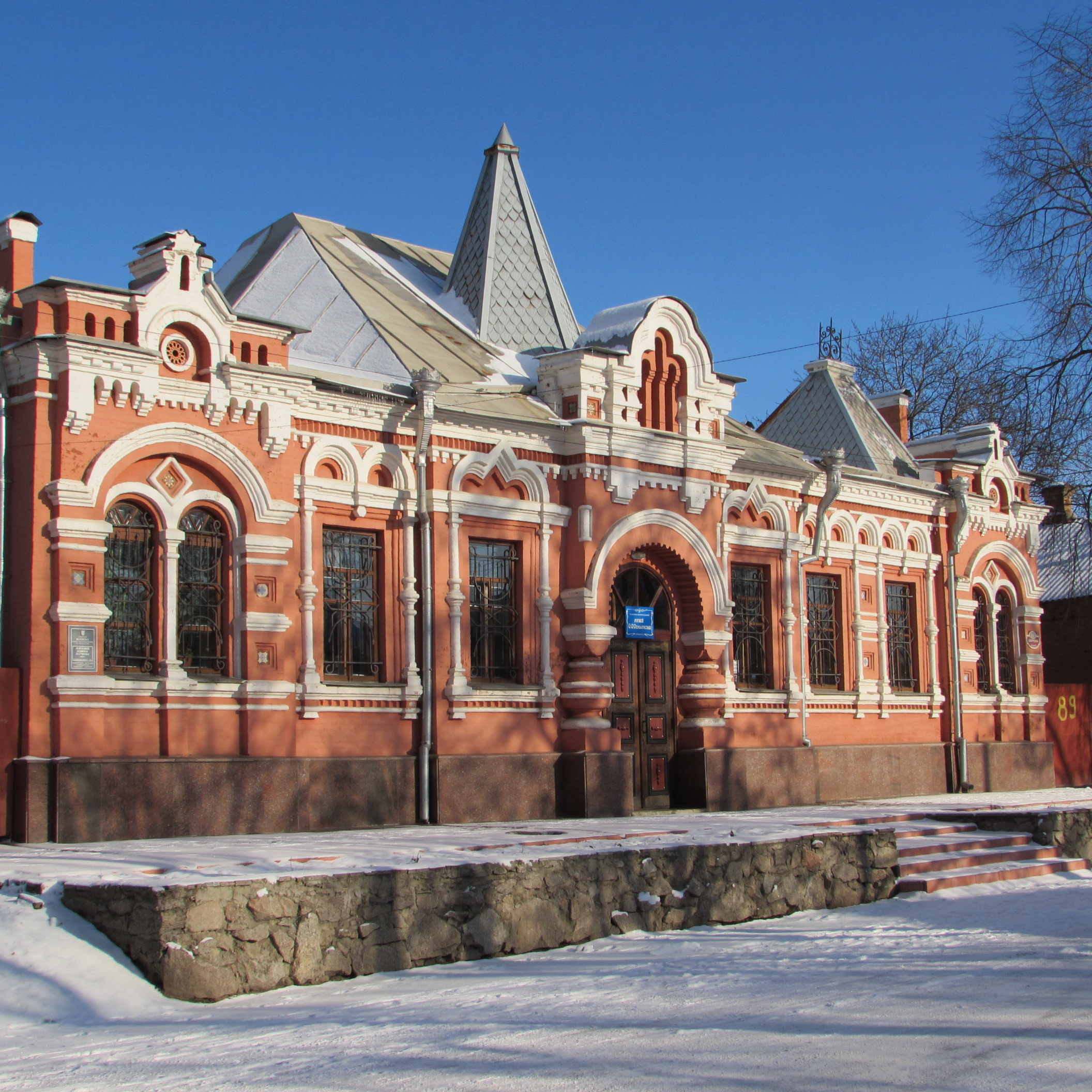
Alexander Osmerkin Museum in Kirovograd

=== Artistic development ===
In 1911–1913, Alexander Osmerkin moved to Kiev to continue his education in art. He attended classes at Kiev Professional School of Art. In Kiev, he met Alexandra Exter and other avant-garde artists, who cast influenced on his vision and style. Although he cited Paul Cézanne as his main influence, Osmerkin absorbed from many sources and styles, before he created his own. He turned to Fauvism after seeing works of Henri Matisse and André Derain and other Fauvists. He visited St. Petersburg several times to study art at museums, and also made numerous landscapes in his own manner blending classical St. Petersburg cityscapes with his Fauvist touch. Eventually he settled in Moscow and joined Ilya Mashkov artistic studio. He followed his teacher and became the youngest artist in "The Jack of Diamond" group.

=== After Revolution ===
Since 1918 Osmerkin worked as a Professor of Art, first in VKhUTEMAS in Moscow. At first he taught alongside Wassily Kandinsky, until the latter emigrated. Then Osmerkin opened his own workshop and also taught at the Surikov Institute of Fine Arts in Moscow. There his circle included such names as poet Osip Mandelstam, writers Osip Brik and Viktor Shklovsky, as well as his fellow artists from the "Bubnovy Valet" group.

=== Leningrad ===
During the 1920s and 1930s, Osmerkin lived and worked in Leningrad. There, upon invitation form Isaac Brodsky, he taught at his master's workshop at the Leningrad Academy of Arts on Vasilevsky Island. In 1927 his canvas "Red Guards at the Winter Palace" (Красная гвардия в Зимнем дворце), also known as "Takeover of the Winter Palace" (Взятие Зимнего) was acquired for the permanent collection of the State Russian Museum in Leningrad. In 1927 Osmerkin took part in the major art show ("Выставка новейших течений в искусстве") at the State Russian Museum, where his works were exhibited alongside the works of Marc Chagall, David Burlyuk, Natalia Goncharova, Mikhail Larionov, Wassily Kandinsky, Robert Falk, Kuzma Petrov-Vodkin, Pyotr Konchalovsky and other masters of Russian art. At that time Osmerkin moved forward with his style, because the peak of avant-garde movements was over right after the revolution, and some trends were losing their novelty, so he embraced a classic and more traditional system of figurative and plastic imagery. He was also able to show his works at the Leningrad Academy of Arts, as well as at Leningrad Union of Artists, he also showed his works at the Leningrad Writers Club, with the help of his friends. In 1937, he made stage design for Pushkins play "Mozart and Salieri" at Bolshoi DramaTheatre. Osmerkin was a head of personal workshop at the Leningrad Academy of Art (since 1932 Institute of Painting, Sculpture, and Architecture, since 1944 Ilia Repin Institute of Painting, Sculpture, and Architecture) and was a one from founders of the Leningrad School of Painting (Russian: Ленинградская школа живописи). He had a number of talented students in Leningrad, such as Elena Skuin, Victor Teterin, Evgenia Baykova, Lev Orekhov, Ivan Godlevsky, Gleb Savinov, Olga Bogaevskaya, Vasily Savitsky, Evsey Moiseenko and other artists.

=== Under Stalin ===
Osmerkin, as a highly original artist who contributed to development of the Russian avant-garde, risked to suffer from the Soviet officialdom under Joseph Stalin. He saw the destruction of private art collections, even some museums and libraries. Osmerkin survived the first wave of persecution of Russian intellectuals. He was emotionally devastated by the arrest and execution of his friend Osip Mandelstam. During the 1940s and 1950s Osmerkin enjoyed a continuous friendship with poet Anna Akhmatova.

In 1946, the Soviet Communist Party started attacks on some intellectuals and creative artists. Along with other victims of such attacks, such as Anna Akhmatova and Mikhail Zoshchenko, Osmerkin was accused of formalism, and spreading western influence to Soviet art. He was banned from teaching and exhibiting his works, so he was left without any income. During his last years, Osmerkin was completely cut off from the Soviet public life and became an underground artist, who expressed himself in painting. He died on 25 June 1953 while working on a landscape painting near Moscow. Alexander Osmerkin was interred in Vagankovo Cemetery in Moscow.

=== Heritage ===
Alexander Osmerkin created over 700 works of art in a variety of genres. His paintings and drawings may be found at the Tretyakov Gallery and Museum of Fine Arts in Moscow, as well as at State Russian Museum in St. Petersburg and many other museums internationally, also in private collections.

=== Family ===
Osmerkin's son Gennady Osmerkin (1946-2019) was also an artist, as well as an industrial designer. He was a professor at FIT in New York City.

== Pupils ==
- Sergei Ivanovich Osipov
- Elena Petrovna Skuin
- Gleb Alexandrovich Savinov
- Olga Borisovna Bogaevskaya
- Victor Kuzmich Teterin
- Lev Nikolaevich Orekhov
- Evgenia Vasilievna Baykova
- Valery Ivanovich Levanidov

== Works ==
As all of the Jacks of Diamonds he consider himself a Cézanne-ist. He also was influenced by fauvism and cubism. Later, not unlike another Jack of Diamonds, Robert Falk he was inspired with the experiments with the colors. Later in his life he became a neo-impressionist.

Osmerkin's successes were mostly connected with chamber landscapes, still lifes and portraits. He also provided some Socialist Realism paintings like portraits of Stakhanovites or Taking the Winter Palace

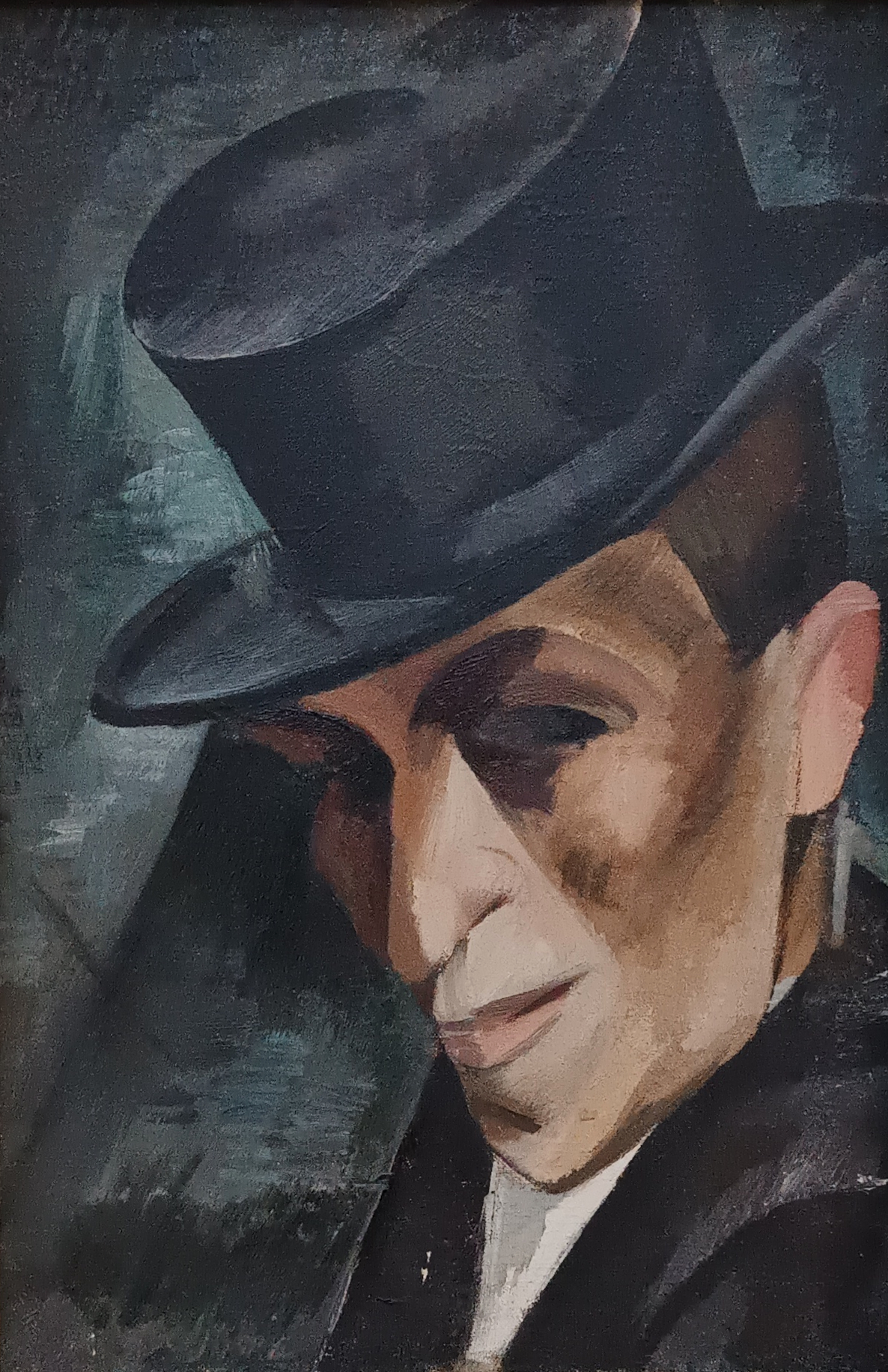
Man in a Top Hat, 1915

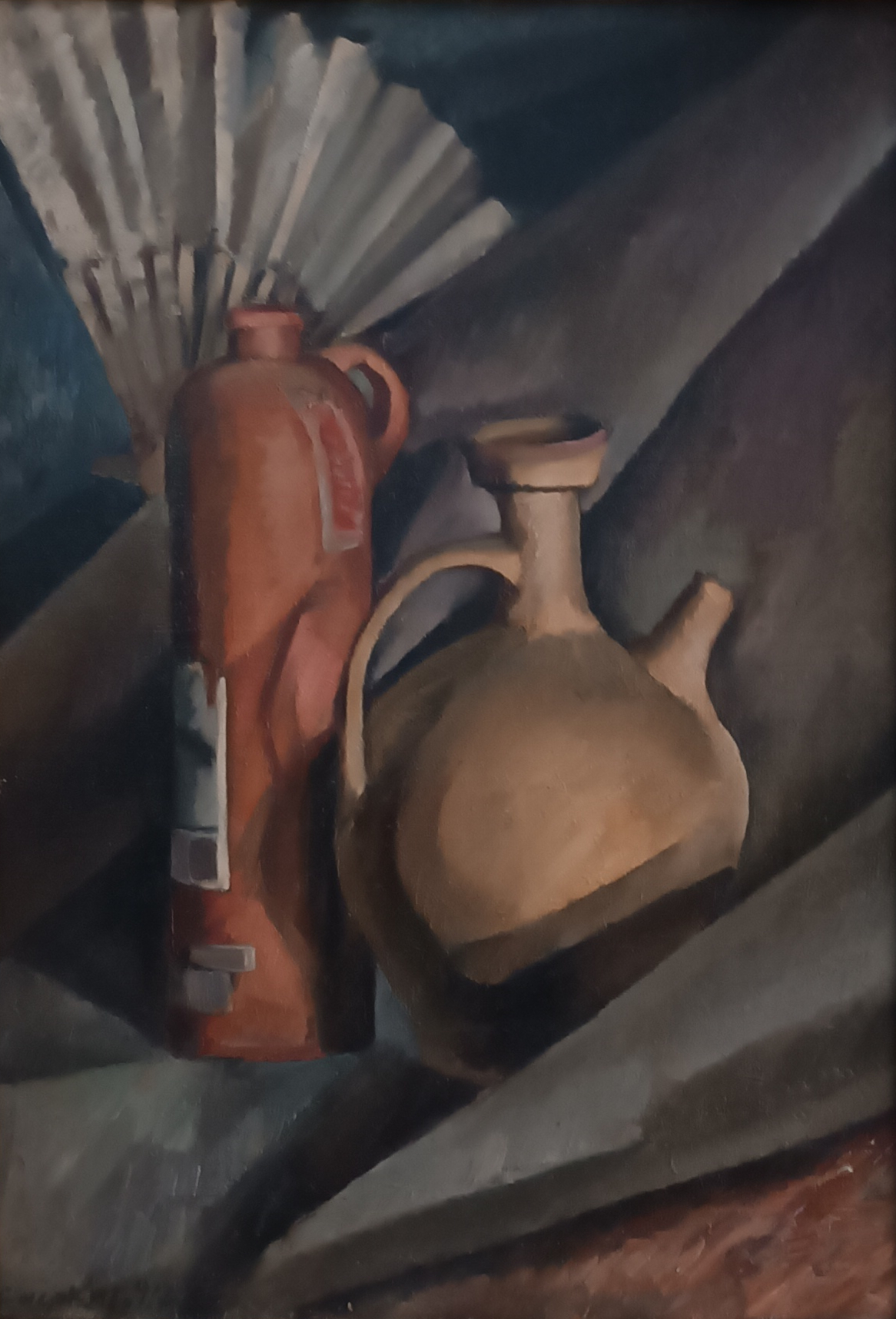
Still life with fan, 1917
