= Gleb Savinov =

Russian painter

Gleb Alexandrovich Savinov
- Born: 27 September 1915; Natalievka, Kharkov Governorate, Russian Empire
- Died: 5 November 2000 (aged 85); Saint Petersburg, Russia
- Education: Repin Institute of Arts
- Known for: Painting, Art teaching
- Movement: Realism
- Awards: Honored Artist of Russian Federation

Gleb Alexandrovich Savinov (Russian: Гле́б Алекса́ндрович Сави́нов; September 27, 1915 – November 5, 2000) was a Soviet, Russian painter and art teacher, Honored Artist of Russian Federation, who lived and worked in Leningrad. He was regarded as one of the leading representatives of the Leningrad school of painting, most famous for his genre and portrait painting.

== Biography ==
Savinov was born 27 September 1915, in Natalievka village, Kharkov Governorate, Russian Empire (present-day Kharkiv Oblast, Ukraine). Savinov's childhood was spent in Saratov, on the Volga River. His father, Alexander Ivanovich Savinov (1881–1942), a talented painter, draftsman and teacher, was a professor at the Academy of Fine Arts. He was friends with several well-known artists from the Saratov School: Kuzma Petrov-Vodkin, Alexander Matveev, Piotr Utkin, Pavel Kuznetsov. They often gathered in the Savinov house in Saratov. Their judgments about art, the creativity of his father, and his personality had a strong impact on the formation of the young artist.

Nevsky Prospekt (1984)

In 1922 Savinov family moved from Saratov to Petrograd. In 1928–1930 Savinov started working in his father's studio while still attending school. In 1934, after graduating from high school he enrolled at the painting department of the Leningrad Institute of Painting, Sculpture and Architecture, where he studied with Pavel Naumov, Michael Bernstein, Nicholai Radlov, Genrikh Pavlovsky, Semion Abugov, and Alexander Osmerkin. In 1940 Savinov graduated from Institute of Painting, Sculpture and Architecture in Alexander Osmerkin's workshop. His graduation work - a painting named Childhood Gorky - was awarded first prize in 1940 in Moscow at the All-Union Exhibition of graduation works of Art Institutes and Colleges. In the same year Savinov married his classmate and artist Olga Bogaevskaya. This family and creative union lasted sixty years.

In August 1940 Savinov was called to serve in the Navy fleet. After the beginning of the Great Patriotic War, Savinov served in parts of the Baltic Fleet, including the defense of Leningrad. Command drew attention to his artistic training. Savinov nominated artist Baltic crew. He was appointed manufacturer of patriotic and anti-fascist panels and posters. He drew a distinction in battle soldiers, wounded in the hospitals, and also participated in the preparation of exhibitions of artists of the Red Army devoted to the fighting troops of the Leningrad Front and the Baltic Fleet. In 1944, Savinov was admitted to the Leningrad Union of Soviet Artists.

After the war, Savinov taught in the Ilya Repin Institute of Arts (1945–1947), then in the Vera Mukhina Institute (1949–1979), where he was Professor of Painting from 1969.

In 1957 at the All-Union Art Exhibition in Moscow, devoted to the 40th Anniversary of the October Revolution, Savinov first showed two large narrative paintings: The University Embankment, and At the street (both 1957). They played an important role in changing of his artistic creation. In these works he appeared as a mature artist, a talented colorist and composer who knows how everyday street scene to lift up to the level of highly generalized image of civil sound. The color scheme of works was built on the harmony of light, bright colors. In both pictures Savinov demonstrated ability in a small space of the canvas clearly convey the feeling of the era, with its household characteristics, originality of types, relationships between people.

Since that time Savinov gained fame and recognition as a master of genre painting. Among his most famous paintings are About Russian women (1960), Country Store, Moto Racing in Yukki (both 1961), Sailors. Year of 1942, Mothers (both 1964), Barricade in Presnya (1967), Povolzhskaya Commune (1969), Victory Day (1975), A First tractor, On the Volga River during the Civil War (both 1980), Tractor on the Volga (1985).

In parallel with work on genre scenes, Savinov painted home interiors, portraits, landscapes, and everyday still lifes. Among them Staraya Ladoga, Leningrad landscape (both 1959), Studio of Artist Igor Veselkin, City outskirts (both 1962), Interior Workshop (1971), Veranda (1972), Branchs, Portrait of Larisa Romanova (both 1975), Roses (1976), A Window, Landscape of Leningrad (both 1977), A Spring in the City (1980), Nevsky Prospekt (1984).

In 1973, Gleb Savinov was awarded the honorary title of the Honored Artist of the RSFSR. His solo exhibitions were in 1991 in Leningrad, and in 2005 in Saint Petersburg and Turin, Italy.

Savinov died on November 5, 2000, in Saint Petersburg at the eighty-sixth year of life. His paintings reside in State Russian Museum, in Art museums and private collections in Russia, France, the US, Japan, Germany, England, and Italy.

== See also ==
- Fine Art of Leningrad
- Leningrad School of Painting
- List of 20th-century Russian painters
- List of painters of Saint Petersburg Union of Artists
- List of the Russian Landscape painters
- Saint Petersburg Union of Artists

== Bibliography ==
- Exhibition of works by Leningrad artists of 1951. Exhibition Catalogue. - Leningrad: Lenizdat Edition, 1951. - p. 18.
- The Fall Exhibition of works by Leningrad artists of 1956. Catalogue. - Leningrad: Leningrad artist, 1958. - p. 21.
- 1917 - 1957. Exhibition of works by Leningrad artists. Catalogue. - Leningrad: Khudozhnik RSFSR, 1958. - p. 28.
- All-Union Art Exhibition of 1957 dedicated to the 40th Anniversary of October Revolution. Catalogue. - Moscow: Soviet artist, 1957. - p. 68.
- The Fall Exhibition of works by Leningrad artists of 1958. Catalogue. - Leningrad: Khudozhnik RSFSR, 1959. - p. 23.
- Exhibition of works by Leningrad artists of 1960. Exhibition catalogue. - Leningrad: Khudozhnik RSFSR, 1963. - p. 16.
- Exhibition of works by Leningrad artists of 1960. Exhibition catalogue. - Leningrad: Khudozhnik RSFSR, 1961. - p. 36.
- Soviet Russia. Republican exhibition of 1960. Catalogue. - Moscow: Ministry of culture of Russian Federation, 1960. - p. 72.
- Exhibition of works by Leningrad artists of 1961. Exhibition catalogue. - Leningrad: Khudozhnik RSFSR, 1964. - p. 35.
- Autumn Exhibition of works by Leningrad artists of 1962. Exhibition Catalogue. - Leningrad: : Khudozhnik RSFSR, 1962. - p. 24.
- The Leningrad Fine Arts Exhibition. - Leningrad: Khudozhnik RSFSR, 1964. - p. 47.
- The Soviet Russia the Second Republic Exhibition of 1965. Exhibition catalogue. - Moscow: Soviet Artist, 1965. - p. 34.
- The Soviet Russia the Third Republic Exhibition of 1967. Catalogue. - Moscow: Ministry of culture of the Russian Federation, 1967. - p. 49.
- Our Contemporary. Exhibition of works by Leningrad artists of 1971. Catalogue. - Leningrad: Khudozhnik RSFSR, 1972. - p. 20.
- Across the Motherland Exhibition of Leningrad artists. Catalogue. - Leningrad: Khudozhnik RSFSR, 1974. - p. 23.
- Our Contemporary. Regional exhibition of works by Leningrad artists of 1975. Catalogue. - Leningrad: Khudozhnik RSFSR, 1980. - p. 23.
- The Fine Arts of Leningrad. Exhibition catalogue. - Leningrad: Khudozhnik RSFSR, 1976. - p. 29.
- Exhibition of works by Leningrad artists dedicated to the 60th Anniversary of October Revolution. Catalogue. - Leningrad: Khudozhnik RSFSR, 1982. - p. 20.
- Directory of members of the Union of Artists of USSR. Volume 2. - Moscow: Soviet artist, 1979. - p. 301.
- Regional Exhibition of works by Leningrad artists of 1980. Exhibition catalogue. - Leningrad: Khudozhnik RSFSR, 1983. - p. 22.
- Nadezhda G. Leonova. Gleb Alexandrovich Savinov. - Leningrad: Khudozhnik RSFSR, 1988.
- Charmes Russes. Auction Catalogue. - Paris: Drouot Richelieu, 15 Mai 1991. - p. 25-27.
- Exhibition of works by Gleb Alexandrovich Savinov. Catalogue. - Leningrad: Khudozhnik RSFSR, 1991.
- L' École de Leningrad. Auction Catalogue. — Paris: Drouot Richelieu, 11 Juin 1990. — р.56-57.
- L' École de Leningrad. Auction Catalogue. — Paris: Drouot Richelieu, 21 Decembre 1990. — р.52-53.
- Les Paintres du Bonheur. Auction Catalogue. - Paris: Drouot Richelieu, 8 Novembre 1993. - p. 7.
- Gleb Alexandrovich Savinov. - Torino: Galleria PIRRA, 1995.
- Памяти учителя. Выставка петербургских художников — учеников мастерской А. А. Осмеркина. Каталог. СПб., Мемориальный музей Н. А. Некрасова, 1997.
- Link of Times: 1932 - 1997. Artists - Members of Saint Petersburg Union of Artists of Russia. Exhibition catalogue. - Saint Petersburg: Manezh Central Exhibition Hall, 1997. - p. 297.
- Matthew C. Bown. Dictionary of 20th Century Russian and Soviet Painters 1900-1980s. - London: Izomar, 1998. ISBN 0-9532061-0-6, ISBN 978-0-9532061-0-0.
- Time for change. The Art of 1960-1985 in the Soviet Union. - Saint Petersburg: State Russian Museum, 2006. - p. 118, 119.
- Sergei V. Ivanov. Unknown Socialist Realism. The Leningrad School.- Saint Petersburg: NP-Print Edition, 2007. – pp. 9, 15, 16, 18–22, 24, 356, 360, 365, 367, 368, 370, 373, 385–389, 391–397, 399, 401–403, 405–407, 439, 445. ISBN 5-901724-21-6, ISBN 978-5-901724-21-7.
- Иванов С. Инвестиции в советскую живопись: ленинградская школа // Петербургские искусствоведческие тетради. Вып. 31. СПб, 2014. С.54-60.
