= Elena Skuin =

Russian artist (1908–1986)

Elena Petrovna Skuin
- Born: Jeļena Skujiņa; 2 April 1908; Ekaterinodar, Kuban Oblast, Russian Empire
- Died: 12 February 1986 (aged 77); Leningrad, USSR
- Education: Repin Institute of Arts
- Known for: Painting, Art teaching
- Movement: Realism

Elena Petrovna Skuin (Russian: Еле́на Петро́вна Скуи́нь, Latvian: Jeļena Skujiņa; 2 April 1908 – 12 February 1986) was a Soviet, Russian–Latvian painter, watercolorist, graphic artist, and art teacher. She lived and worked in Leningrad and was a member of the Leningrad Union of Artists. She is regarded as one of representatives of the Leningrad school of painting and is most famous for her still life paintings.

== Biography ==
Elena Petrovna Skuin was born on 2 April 1908 in Ekaterinodar, Kuban Oblast, Russian Empire, in a teacher's family, who arrived in the Kuban from Riga. After graduation from high school, she studied from 1926 to 1930 at the Kuban Teachers College, where she gained her first professional skills of the painter. After graduating from college in 1930 or 1931, she taught drawing in a high school in Krasnodar. Her ability to draw, a bright character and a desire to improve in their chosen profession identified further choice of the path.

In 1931, Elena Skuin comes to Leningrad, worked as an artist at the Stalin Metalworks, then studied at the Institute for Advanced education of Art workers.

In 1936, Elena Skuin entered at the third course of the Painting department of the Leningrad Institute of Painting, Sculpture and Architecture. She studied with Semion Abugov, Genrikh Pavlovsky, Dmitry Mitrokhin, Rudolf Frentz.

In 1939, Elena Skuin graduated from Leningrad Institute of Painting, Sculpture and Architecture in Alexander Osmerkin´s personal art studio. Her graduate work was a painting named "Lesson of the circle, studying the Naval Science" (Museum of Academy of Arts, Saint Petersburg).

In October 1939, Elena Skuin was admitted to the Leningrad Union of Soviet Artists, receiving a membership card number 285.

In 1940–1941, by the invitation of Professor Rudolf Frentz she worked as an assistant in his studio of a battle painting for the Leningrad Institute of Painting, Sculpture and Architecture.

After the beginning of Great Patriotic War Elena Skuin and her daughter were evacuated to Kazakhstan in city Leninsk-Kuznetsk. There she worked as an artist of Drama Theater named after S. Ordzhonikidze, participated in the design of the city, as well as exhibitions of artists of Kuzbass.

In 1944 Elena Skuin returned to Leningrad. She began her teaching job, first in the Secondary Art School at the Leningrad Institute of Painting, Sculpture and Architecture named after Ilya Repin, then at the Department of General Painting in Vera Mukhina Institute. At the same time she works a lot creatively and participated in most exhibitions of Leningrad artists. She painted genre paintings, portraits, still lifes, and landscapes. She worked in oil painting, watercolors, charcoal drawings. The greatest success and recognition achieved in the genre of still life paintings and watercolors.

In 1951 Elena Skuin leave teaching and move to work under contracts with LenIzo (Commercial Association of Leningrad Artists) as an artist of painting. It was during this period of still life is establishing itself as the leading genre in her work. This is evidenced by the work shown at the Spring exhibitions of Leningrad artists in 1954 and 1955 years, and the Autumn exhibitions in 1956 and 1958 years. Still lifes with flowers and fruits that are painted by her in this period were frankly fictional, masterfully orchestrated, elegant and solemn talking about the fullness and joy of life.

In 1960s Elena Skuin made some creative journeys in search of material for paintings, including her native Kuban land. Their results led to numerous sketches done from the life, also paintings "Tobacco of Kuban", "In horticulture" (both 1962), "Tobacco", "Garden Still Life" (both 1964), and others, as well as turn in the manner of her painting. After trips to the Kuban tonal painting techniques are giving way to decorative painting. The leading place in her works is given color spot, specifying the character of the composition. For her manners are typical of a bright saturated colors, exquisite color relationships, broad painting, decorative and upbeat attitude.

A peak of her decorative painting comes in the works of 1971 "Dark-blue buckets", and "Still Life with red balloons". Here the color spot conveys the shape of objects with modeling just one silhouette. The brevity decision created at the same time a wide range of associations. A color of objects, ordinary and familiar, becomes self-sufficient, and received semi-mystical importance, with a deep richness of overtones, with a broad associative, emotional content. Among her famous paintings of this period are "Still Life with Quince", "Still Life with Fish" (both 1961), "Begonia", "Watering can and Roses" (both 1964), "Violets" (1965), "Still Life with Jug and persimmon", "Blue Still Life" (both 1968), "The branch of the Apricot Tree" (1968), "Wistarias", "Lacemaker" (both 1969), "Evening Primrose and Cyclamen" (1971), "Favorite profession. Florists" (1975), "Lilacs", "The Apple Tree in Blossom" (both 1980), and others.

During the 1970s, Elena Skuin produced a significant body of work in watercolor. Paintings such as Still Life with Bluebell (1969), Old English China and Pineapple (1971), and Red Corner (1974) exemplify her skill in the medium and have contributed to her recognition as a master of watercolor. Employing a wide range of techniques, she created vivid and memorable images that reflect the contemporary world, conveying its aesthetic qualities while giving everyday objects a sense of warmth.

Her solo exhibitions were in Leningrad (1978) and Saint Petersburg (2005).

Elena Petrovna Skuin died in Leningrad in 1986. Her paintings reside in State Russian Museum, in Art museums and private collections in Russia, in the U.S., Japan, Germany, England, France, and throughout the world.

== See also ==
- Leningrad School of Painting
- List of 20th-century Russian painters
- List of painters of Saint Petersburg Union of Artists
- Saint Petersburg Union of Artists

== Sources ==
- The Spring Exhibition of works by Leningrad artists of 1954. Catalogue. - Leningrad: Izogiz, 1954. - p. 18.
- The Spring Exhibition of works by Leningrad artists of 1955. Catalogue. - Leningrad: Leningrad Union of artists, 1956. - p. 17.
- The Fall Exhibition of works by Leningrad artists of 1956. Catalogue. - Leningrad: Leningrad artist, 1958. - p. 22.
- The Fall Exhibition of works by Leningrad artists of 1958. Catalogue. - Leningrad: Khudozhnik RSFSR, 1959. - p. 25.
- Exhibition of works by Leningrad artists of 1960. Exhibition catalogue. - Leningrad: Khudozhnik RSFSR, 1961. - p. 38.
- Exhibition of works by Leningrad artists of 1961. Exhibition catalogue. - Leningrad: Khudozhnik RSFSR, 1964. - p. 37.
- The Fall Exhibition of works by Leningrad artists of 1962. Catalogue. - Leningrad: Khudozhnik RSFSR, 1962. - p. 25.
- The Leningrad Fine Arts Exhibition. - Leningrad: Khudozhnik RSFSR, 1964. - p. 50.
- The Spring Exhibition of works by Leningrad artists of 1965. Catalogue. - Leningrad: Khudozhnik RSFSR, 1970. - p. 28.
- The Fall Exhibition of works by Leningrad artists of 1968. Catalogue. - Leningrad: Khudozhnik RSFSR, 1971. - p. 14.
- The Spring Exhibition of works by Leningrad artists of 1969. Catalogue. - Leningrad: Khudozhnik RSFSR, 1970. - p. 17.
- Our Contemporary Exhibition catalogue of works by Leningrad artists of 1971. - Leningrad: Khudozhnik RSFSR, 1972. - p. 20.
- Art works by Russian Federation Artists grants to Museums and Culture Institutions (1963–1971). Official Catalogue. - Moscow: Russian Federation Union of Artists, 1972. - p. 102.
- The Still-Life Exhibition of works by Leningrad artists. Exhibition catalogue. - Leningrad: Khudozhnik RSFSR, 1973. - p. 12.
- Our Contemporary regional exhibition of Leningrad artists of 1975. Catalogue. - Leningrad: Khudozhnik RSFSR, 1980. - p. 24.
- The Fine Arts of Leningrad. Exhibition catalogue. - Leningrad: Khudozhnik RSFSR, 1976. - p. 30.
- Exhibition of works by Leningrad artists dedicated to the 60th Anniversary of October Revolution. Catalogue. - Leningrad: Khudozhnik RSFSR, 1982. - p. 21.
- Directory of Members of the Union of Artists of USSR. Volume 2. - Moscow: Soviet artist, 1979. - p. 356.
- Regional Exhibition of works by Leningrad artists of 1980. Exhibition catalogue. - Leningrad: Khudozhnik RSFSR, 1983. - p. 23.
- Charmes Russes. Auction Catalogue. - Paris: Drouot Richelieu, 15 Mai 1991. - p. 77.
- Saint-Pétersbourg - Pont-Audemer. Dessins, Gravures, Sculptures et Tableaux du XX siècle du fonds de L' Union des Artistes de Saint-Pétersbourg. - Pont-Audemer: 1994. - p. 49.
- Sergei V. Ivanov. The Still-Life in Painting of 1940-1990s. The Leningrad School. Exhibition catalogue. - Saint Petersburg: Nikolai Nekrasov Memorial museum, 1997. - p. 6.
- In Memory of the Teacher. Exhibition of Saint Petersburg artists - students of Alexander Osmerkin. - Saint Petersburg: Nikolai Nekrasov Memorial Museum, 1997. - p. 4–5.
- Matthew C. Bown. Dictionary of 20th Century Russian and Soviet Painters 1900-1980s. - London: Izomar, 1998. ISBN 0-9532061-0-6, ISBN 978-0-9532061-0-0.
- Link of Times: 1932 - 1997. Artists - Members of Saint - Petersburg Union of Artists of Russia. Exhibition catalogue. - Saint - Petersburg: Manezh Central Exhibition Hall, 1997. - p. 298.
- Elena Petrovna Skuin. - Saint petersburg: RusArt, 2005.
- Sergei V. Ivanov. Unknown Socialist Realism. The Leningrad School.- Saint Petersburg: NP-Print Edition, 2007. – pp. 9, 15, 20, 21, 369, 384, 385, 389–397, 401, 404–407, 439, 443. ISBN 5-901724-21-6, ISBN 978-5-901724-21-7.
- Anniversary Directory graduates of Saint Petersburg State Academic Institute of Painting, Sculpture, and Architecture named after Ilya Repin, Russian Academy of Arts. 1915 - 2005. - Saint Petersburg: Pervotsvet Publishing House, 2007. p. 51. ISBN 978-5-903677-01-6.
- Логвинова Е. Круглый стол по ленинградскому искусству в галерее АРКА // Петербургские искусствоведческие тетради. Вып. 31. СПб, 2014. С.17-26.
