= Sergei Babkov (painter) =

Russian painter (1920 - 1993)

Sergei Fedorovich Babkov
- Born: 28 December 1920; Zlatoust, Soviet Russia
- Died: 6 October 1993 (aged 72); Saint Petersburg, Russia
- Education: Repin Institute of Arts
- Known for: Painting
- Movement: Realism
- Awards: Order of the Red Star (twice); Order of the Patriotic War; Medal "For the Victory Over Germany"; Medal For the Capture of Berlin

Sergei Fedorovich Babkov (Russian: Серге́й Фёдорович Бабков; 28 December 1920, Zlatoust, Soviet Russia; 6 October 1993, Saint Petersburg, Russia) was a Soviet Russian painter, a member of the Saint Petersburg Union of Artists (before 1992 — the Leningrad Union of Artists), who lived and worked in Leningrad, regarded as a representative of the Leningrad school of painting, most famous for his genre and portrait paintings.

== See also ==
- Leningrad School of Painting
- List of 20th-century Russian painters
- List of painters of Saint Petersburg Union of Artists
- Saint Petersburg Union of Artists

== Sources ==
- 1917 — 1957. Выставка произведений ленинградских художников. Каталог. Л., Ленинградский художник, 1958. С.8.
- Никифоровская И. Итоги большой творческой работы // Вечерний Ленинград. 1957, 10 октября.
- Выставка произведений ленинградских художников 1961 года. Каталог. Л., Художник РСФСР, 1964. С.9.
- Ленинград. Зональная выставка. Л., Художник РСФСР, 1965. С.9.
- Каталог весенней выставки произведений ленинградских художников 1965 года. Л., Художник РСФСР, 1970. С.8.
- Выставка произведений ленинградских художников, посвящённая 25-летию Победы над фашистской Германией. Каталог. Л., Художник РСФСР, 1972. С.17.
- Художники народов СССР. Биобиблиографический словарь. Т.1. М., Искусство, 1970. С.249-250.
- Наш современник. Зональная выставка произведений ленинградских художников 1975 года. Каталог. Л., Художник РСФСР, 1980. С.11.
- Справочник членов Союза художников СССР. Т. 1 М., Советский художник, 1979. С.78.
- Справочник членов Ленинградской организации Союза художников РСФСР. Л., Художник РСФСР, 1987. С.9.
- Peinture Russe. Catalogue. Paris, Drouot Richelieu, 24 Septembre 1991. Р.15-17.
- Выставка произведений художников — ветеранов Великой Отечественной войны. СПб, 1998.
- Matthew Cullerne Bown. A Dictionary of Twentieth Century Russian And Soviet Painters. 1900 — 1980s. London, Izomar Limited, 1998.
- Мы помним… Художники, искусствоведы — участники Великой Отечественной войны. М., Союз художников России, 2000. С.33.
- Художники — городу. Выставка к 70-летию Санкт-Петербургского Союза художников. Каталог. — Санкт-Петербург: Петрополь, 2003. — с.178.
- Sergei V. Ivanov. Unknown Socialist Realism. The Leningrad School. Saint Petersburg, NP-Print Edition, 2007. P.392, 398. ISBN 5-901724-21-6, ISBN 978-5-901724-21-7.
- Юбилейный Справочник выпускников Санкт-Петербургского академического института живописи, скульптуры и архитектуры имени И. Е. Репина Российской Академии художеств. 1915—2005. СПб., «Первоцвет», 2007. С.73.
