= Collections of the Russian Museum =

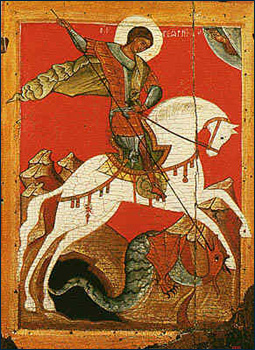
A 15th-century icon of St. George from Novgorod, now in the collection of the Russian Museum.

Among the collections of the Russian Museum in Saint Petersburg in Russia are some of the greatest pieces of Russian art in the world.

The Museum houses collections of sculpture, objets d'art, drawings and paintings including the famous picture gallery.

== Icons ==
- The Angel with Golden Hair

== 18th-19th century ==
The Last Day of Pompeii by Karl Brullov

- The Last Day of Pompeii by Karl Brullov, 1830–33
- The Ninth Wave by Ivan Aivazovsky, 1850
- Barge Haulers on the Volga by Ilya Repin, 1870–1873
- Sadko by Ilya Repin (1876)
- Reply of the Zaporozhian Cossacks by Ilya Repin, 1880–1891
- Moonlit Night on the Dnieper by Arkhip Kuindzhi, 1880
- The Great Taking of the Veil by Mikhail Nesterov, 1898
- Portrait of Murtaza Kuli Khan by Vladimir Borovikovsky
- The Brazen Serpent by Fyodor Bruni
- Phrine at the Festival of Poseidon at the Eleusinia by Henryk Siemiradzki
- Christ's Appearance to St Mary Magdalene by Alexander Ivanov
- Portrait of Maria Rumyantseva by Aleksey Antropov
- Bogatyr by Viktor Vasnetsov
- Portrait of an Unknown Woman in a Violet Dress by Evgraf Fedorovich Krendovsky
- Last Supper by Nikolai Ge
- Suvorov crossing the Alps by Vasily Surikov

== Modern (19th-20th century) ==
- Ceremonial Sitting of the State Council on 7 May 1901 Marking the Centenary of its Foundation by Ilya Repin, 1903
- Black Circle by Kazimir Malevich
- Red Square by Kazimir Malevich
- Red Cavalry by Kazimir Malevich, 1932
- Portrait of Ivan Pavlov by Mikhail Nesterov, 1930
- Portrait of Jack Hunter by Nicolai Fechin
- Portrait of Chaliapin by Boris Kustodiev
- Cyclist by Natalia Goncharova

== Soviet art ==
- A Fascist Flew Past by Arkady Plastov
- Cherry by Yevsey Moiseyenko
- Mothers, Sisters by Yevsey Moiseyenko

== Naïve art ==
- Katya Medvedeva
