= Sassoli =

Sassoli is an Italian surname that may refer to

- Dina Sassoli (1920–2008), Italian film actress
- Lorenzo Sassoli de Bianchi (born 1952), Italian businessman and philanthropist
- David Sassoli (1956–2022), president of the European parliament
- Pietro Sassoli (1898–1946), Italian composer and conductor
