= List of paintings by Mikhail Nesterov =

This is an incomplete list of paintings by Mikhail Nesterov (1862–1942).

All paintings are described as 'oil on canvas' except where stated otherwise.

Image	Name	Year	Dimensions (cm)	Current Location	Ref
	For a Love Potion	1888	125 × 142	Radishchev Art Museum, Saratov	
	The Hermit	1888–89	144.5 × 126.4	Tretyakov Gallery, Moscow	
	The Vision to the Youth Bartholomew	1889–90	160 × 211	Tretyakov Gallery, Moscow	
	Portrait of Apollinary Vasnetsov	1890		Tretyakov Gallery, Moscow	
	The Great Taking of the Veil	1898	178 × 195	Russian Museum, St Petersburg	
	Portrait of Yekaterina Petrovna Nesterova	1905	142.5 × 107.8	Tretyakov Gallery, Moscow	
	Woman in a Riding Habit or Portrait of Olga Nesterova	1906	175.5 × 86.5	Russian Museum, St Petersburg	
	Russia (The People's Soul)	1914–16	204.5 × 481	Tretyakov Gallery, Moscow	
	The Philosophers	1917	126 × 126	Tretyakov Gallery, Moscow	
	Portrait of Archbishop Anthony	1917		Tretyakov Gallery, Moscow	
	Thinker (Portrait of Ivan Ilyin)	1921–22	126.5 × 124.5	Russian Museum, St Petersburg	
	Visions of St. Sergius when a Child (aka Bartholomew)	1922	91.1 × 109.2	private collection	
	On the Volga	1922	73 × 77	Yekaterinburg Museum of Fine Arts, Yekaterinburg	
	Wayfarers. Beyond the Volga	1922	81.5 × 107.5	private collection	
	Self-portrait of Mikhail Nesterov	1928	77 × 75	Russian Museum, St Petersburg	
	Cypress trees by the sea. Etude	1928	25 × 30	Radishchev Art Museum, Saratov	
	Portrait of Ivan Pavlov	1930	80 x 77	Russian Museum, St Petersburg	
	Portrait of the Brothers Pavel and Alexander Korin	1930		Tretyakov Gallery, Moscow	
	Portrait of Russian Surgeon, Sergei Yudin	1933			
	Portrait of the surgeon, S.S.Yudin	1935		Tretyakov Gallery, Moscow	
	Portrait of E.P. Razumova	1936	63 × 52	Radishchev Art Museum, Saratov	
	Portrait of Yelizaveta Kruglikova	1939	82 × 59	Russian Museum, St Petersburg	
	Portrait of Vera Mukhina	1940	80 × 75	Tretyakov Gallery, Moscow	
