= Radonezh =

Historic village in Moscow Oblast, Russia

Coordinates: 56°13′N 38°03′E

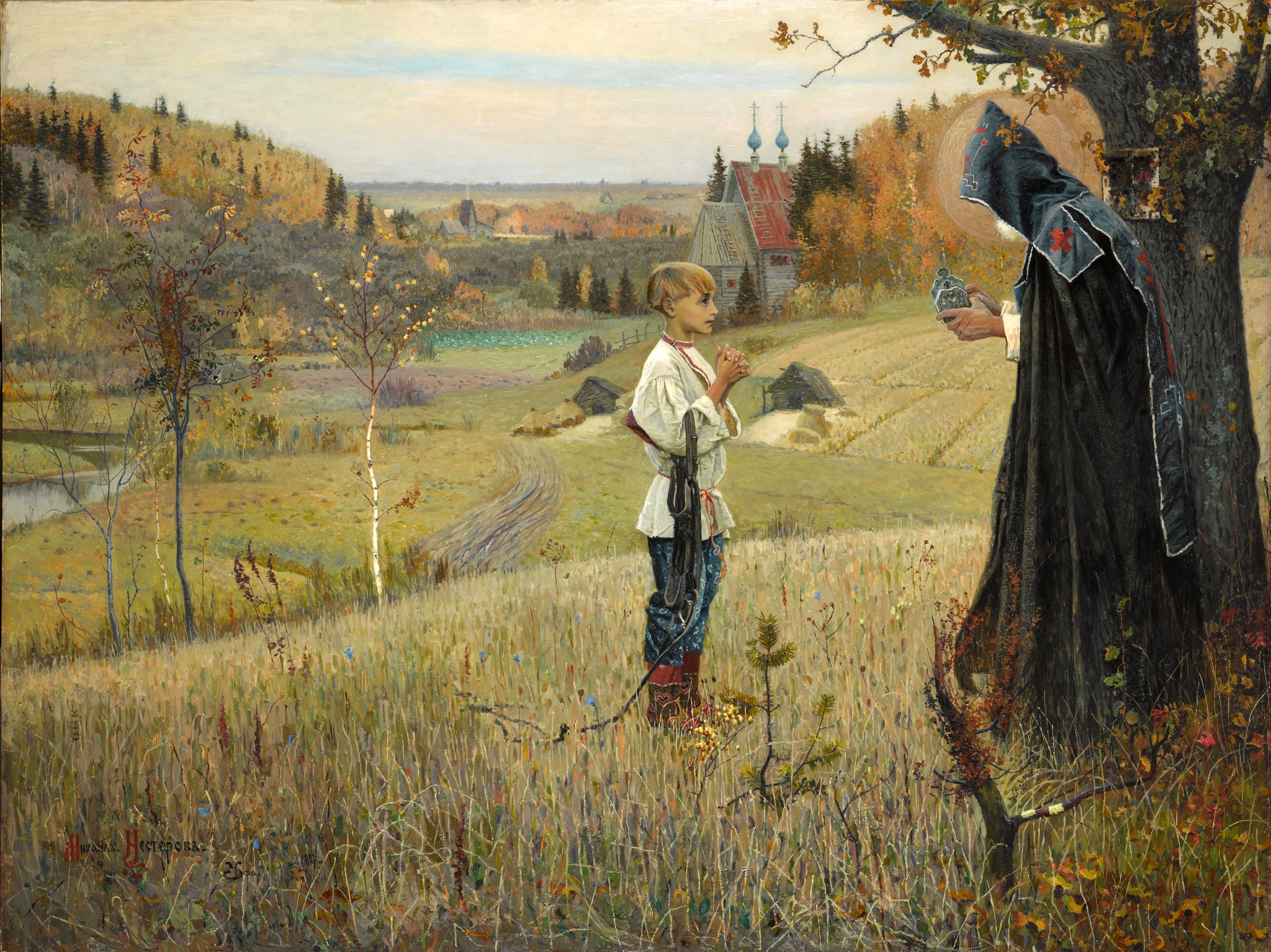
The Vision to the Youth Bartholomew by Mikhail Nesterov – an episode in the career of the young Sergii Radonezhsky

Radonezh (Russian: Радонеж), formerly known as Gorodok (Городо́к) is a historic village in Moscow Oblast, Russia, located about 15 kilometers (9.3 mi) from Sergiyev Posad.

The old town of Radonezh is known to have existed since the first half of the 14th century, when it belonged to Ivan Kalita (Prince of Moscow from 1325). In 1328, Ivan Kalita settled there many captives from Rostov, including the future Saint Sergii Radonezhsky. About twenty years later, Sergii founded the Trinity Monastery to the north of Radonezh.

The town belonged to Vladimir of Serpukhov (lived in 1353–1410) and to his descendants until 1426, when the last appanage prince of Radonezh died without naming an heir. There ensued a bitter struggle for the possession of the town, which ended in Vasily II of Moscow's being taken captive in Radonezh by his cousin Dmitry Shemyaka and later blinded in 1446.

The economic and political rise of the nearby Trinity Monastery adversely affected the overall development of Radonezh. In the late 15th to 16th century, the monastery eclipsed the town, which later became a village.

As of 2015, the remnants of Radonezh are located on an elevated cape, rounded by a curve of the Pazha River. Traces of ramparts and a moat remain. A monument to St Sergii was opened in front of the local church in 1988. Designed by Vyacheslav Klykov, it was the first public statue to be erected in the Soviet Union without permission from the authorities. The largest part of the former town is now occupied by a cemetery.

Although any new burials at this archeological site are now illegal, new graves continue to be added; some of them at the expense of the old earth walls being destroyed.
