= Rinat Voligamsi =

Russian artist (born 1968)

- Ринат Фазлетдинович Исмагилов
- Born: Rinat Fazletdinovich Ismagilov; 6 March 1968 (age 58); Yermolaevo, Kuyurgazinsky District, Bashkir ASSR
- Education: Ufa State Petroleum Technological University
- Style: Surrealism, Post-conceptualism

Rinat Fazletdinovich Ismagilov (Russian: Ринат Фазлетдинович Исмагилов; born 6 March 1968), better known as Rinat Voligamsi (Russian: Ринат Волигамси), is a Russian surrealist painter. His works largely deal with his childhood in the Soviet Union as well as the situation of modern Russia. He is based in Ufa.

== Life and career ==
Voligamsi was born in 1968 in the small town of Yermolaevo in what was then the Bashkir ASSR. He has had an interest in painting since a young age. He entered into Ufa State Petroleum Technological University in 1984, where he received an education in architecture, graduating in 1989. He was conscripted into the Red Army in 1988, but was released within a year to return to his studies. In 1994, he was given the State Prize of the Russian Federation in recognition of his work. Since 2000, Voligamsi has been a member of the Russian Union of Artists. In 2014, he won the Repin Prize of the Russian Federation and was nominated for the Kandinsky Prize.

Voligamsi gained widespread recognition for his 2006 Unofficial Album collection, a fictional retelling of the life of Vladimir Lenin through his art. In the collection, Lenin has a twin brother named Sergei and he survives through 1924, deciding to throw away his life in politics and choosing to live life as a Muslim.

His other collections include Snow (2011–13), Dvoegorsk (2018), focusing on a fictional town named Dvoegorsk, and The Conditions of Winter, focusing on soldiers surviving through the harsh Russian winter.

== Style ==
Voligamsi is known for a style that crosses between surrealism and photorealism. He bases many of his artworks off old Soviet newspapers and photographs. His process involves finding photographs related to the subject area he wants to depict, studying the pictures, putting them away and painting from memory. Voligamsi describes the USSR he grew up in as a fundamental influence on his work, but he leaves the messages of his work regarding the USSR to the interpretation of his audience. In terms of the mood of his paintings, he cites his influence as British punk, and his military influences stem from his military service. He describes his work as humorous and creating a precarious balance between "rationality and utter insanity".

== Permanent collections ==
- Omsk Museum of Fine Arts, Omsk
- Bashkir Nesterov Art Museum, Ufa
- Krasnoyarsk Cultural-Historical Museum Complex, Krasnoyarsk
- Moscow Museum of Modern Art, Moscow
- Erarta, St. Petersburg
