= Lorenzo Sassoli de Bianchi =

Italian businessman (born 1952)

Lorenzo Sassoli de Bianchi (born in Paris, 1952) is an Italian businessman, writer, art critic and philanthropist, founder and currently President of Valsoia, an Italian health food company.

Sassoli de Bianchi has also written five novels: La luna rossa, (2020), La luna bianca (2021) La luna argento (2022), Evangelina (2023) and Maskeropolis (2026).

In 2015, he was honoured for his services to enterprise with the Italian knighthood of Cavaliere del Lavoro, presented by the President of Italy His Excellency Sergio Mattarella.

== Biography ==
Born in Paris in 1952, Sassoli de Bianchi graduated in medicine at Bologna University, where he subsequently worked as a neurologist specialising in sleep diseases while studying Art History and Criticism at UIA University, Florence.

In 1986, Sassoli de Bianchi joined the Board of Directors of the distillers Buton, who created Vecchia Romagna brandy, and was appointed Chief Executive Officer later in the year.

Sassoli De Bianchi founded the health food company Valsoia in 1990. The company went public in 2006.

== Other responsibilities ==
Sassoli de Bianchi has been President of the television ratings service Auditel since April 2024.

He is a President Emeritus of the Italian Advertisers Association (Utenti Pubblicità Associati – UPA), having been President from June 2007 to July 2024.

He was appointed President of the Bologna Museum of Modern Art in 1995, 2009 and 2013. In 2015, when the Museum - together with many others in the city - came under the control of the newly formed Bologna Musei, the body responsible for 13 of Bologna's museums, including the Bologna Museum of Modern Art (MAMbo), the Morandi Museum and the Bologna Archaeological Museum, Sassoli de Bianchi was appointed President of this body, serving until November 2016.

On 12 December 2016, he was made an acting member of the Bologna Academy of Art (Accademia Clementina di Belle Arti).

From 2001 to 2015 he was also Vice Chairman of the Emilia Romagna Region Ministerial Commission for Culture and the Arts, and has since 1990 been a Member of the Governing Board of the Bologna Festival Musical Association.

From 2019 to 2022, he was Vice-President of the Italian National Federation of Cavalieri del Lavoro (Federazione Nazionale Cavalieri del Lavoro).

Past responsibilities include Vice Chairman of the Bologna business association Unindustria from 2004 to 2007, Board Member of the Bologna development agency Promo-Bologna from 2003 to 2007, of UniCredit Bank from 2012 to 2015 and of the Bologna Film Library from 1995 to 2000.

== Charitable Commitments ==
Sassoli de Bianchi's charitable commitments include board-level positions on two eminent charities, the Fondazione del Monte (from 2002 to 2012), which provides support in the areas of social solidarity, community development, scientific research and the arts and culture, and the Centro San Domenico cultural association (from 2005 to the present).

== Works ==
=== Art Criticism ===
An art lover and critic, Sassoli de Bianchi has published widely on modern and contemporary art, with essays on, amongst others, Raul Dufy, Salvador Dalí, Giorgio Morandi, Julian Schnabel, Zhang Xiaotao and Feng Zhengjie. Among the first to bring Chinese contemporary art to the attention of the West, he is the author of the books China: contemporary painting (2005), From Heaven to Earth (2008) and Pu Jie (2009). He also contributed the introduction and two essays to the book Primary on the artist Feng Zhengjie.

Sassoli de Bianchi was the curator of the 2009 Pu Jie exhibition in Beijing.

=== Fiction ===
Sassoli de Bianchi’s first novel, La luna rossa (The red moon), was published by Sperling & Kupfer in late August 2020. Well received by the public and press, it tells the story of father and son musicians Jerry and Ninetto Romano, and the dream that takes them from Naples to New York. Rich in stories within stories, literary and musical references and the characters of living musicians - including the author’s friend Michael Stipe and Tom Waits - the novel adopts a Broadway musical movie style and provides a Spotify playlist (La Luna Rossa) as soundtrack to accompany the reader’s journey. The foreword is written by the musician, film director and radio and TV personality Renzo Arbore.

His second novel, La luna bianca (The white moon), published by Sperling & Kupfer in August 2021, tells of a mother of pearl moon that watches over an insomnia epidemic with which the entire city is afflicted. Two brothers, relatives of the first confirmed victim, assist the scientific investigations conducted by a neurologist familiar with exploring the unknown workings of the brain. Faced with this mystery, medicine shows its limits, and so literature and art, magic and the occult come into play. Sassoli de Bianchi reinterprets the world of neuroscience in his characters’ dreamlike path through insomnia’s pervasion of great literature.

His third novel, La luna argento (The silver moon), was published by Sperling & Kupfer in June 2022. The book is a heartfelt plea to overcome the unconfessed repression of marginalised elders and youths that dominates our times. The novel is a call to look beyond the myth of efficiency and rediscover the absolute dignity of the human being.

His fourth novel, Evangelina, was published in November 2023, again by Sperling & Kupfer. Drawing on his experience as a young doctor during the 1980 Irpinia earthquake, the novel tells the story of a young woman painter he knew, who was able to live both within and outside time in a different existential dimension from the conventional constraints of a period that was purely positive, shunning all pain and guilt. Evangelina, conversely, shows how what upsets and hurts us, shaking us to our roots, is able to generate an authentic experience that opens the way to the purest beauty.

Sassoli de Bianchi’s most recent novel, Maskeropolis, was published by Piemme in April 2026. A parable about masks, acting and the construction of identity where no one is who they say they are, Maskeropolis explores a fictional dystopia that holds up a disquieting mirror to our world today.

=== Non-Fiction ===
In November 2025, Minerva Edizioni published Sassoli de Bianchi’s impressionistic exploration of Bologna and its history with photographs by Lorenzo Capellini “Bologna, frammenti di emozioni”.

== Recognition ==
Italian knighthood of Cavaliere del Lavoro presented for services to enterprise by the President of Italy, His Excellency Sergio Mattarella, on 22 May 2015.

Sassoli de Bianchi was awarded the Francesco Corbisiero prize for literature in 2024.
