= Utenti Pubblicità Associati =

Italian advertisers association

Utenti Pubblicità Associati (UPA) is the Italian Advertisers' Association, based in Milan.

== History ==
Utenti Pubblicità Associati (UPA) was founded in 1948 to represent the interests of Italian advertisers. The association engages actively and proactively with industry, political, legislative and regulatory bodies, while helping its members enhance the effectiveness of their advertising through a range of services. These currently include free consultancy, market monitoring data and surveys from a variety of media research companies that are either owned or supported by UPA.

The Association is a member of the World Federation of Advertisers (WFA), supports the Italian Advertising Self-Regulation Institute and sponsors the University Ca’ Foscari of Venice Master in Business Communications. The UPA's Board and active members include the directors of many of Italy's leading companies and multinationals.

=== Giulio Malgara presidency ===
Much of the groundwork for the UPA's recent achievements was laid by Giulio Malgara, its President from 1984 to 2007 and currently President of Quaker Europe and Chairman and Managing Director of the bakery products company Malgara Chiari Forti SpA. Malgara was particularly influential in giving the UPA a strong research basis, founding the television audience research company Auditel in 1984.

=== Lorenzo Sassoli de Bianchi presidency ===
Lorenzo Sassoli de Bianchi, the founder of Italy's leading health food company, Valsoia, and President of the Bologna Museum of Modern Art (MAMbo), took over from Malgara in June 2007. Widely respected by Italian industrialists for Valsoia's use of cross-media advertising and his personal skills as a communicator and consensus-builder, Sassoli de Bianchi was appointed President on a modernising agenda. Acting in the participative style for which he is renowned and applying the methodology he developed at Valsoia, Sassoli de Bianchi immediately worked with the organisation's active members to formulate a clear mission statement and objectives, as well as to restructure the governance of the association and to increase participation, accountability, innovation and transparency.

The projects launched under this programme include a research centre, initiatives to promote regional representation and national growth, and an extensive series of services and strategic partnerships to help members orient themselves with respect to the complex and rapidly changing social, regulatory and technological developments in modern advertising.

Lorenzo Sassoli de Bianchi was reappointed President of the UPA for a further 3 years in 2009.

As well as playing a lobbying and educating role, the UPA adopts a proactive partnership approach in its dealings with the government, legal and regulatory authorities, advertising agencies and the media, supported by issuing regular trend reports and analyses. These initiatives have consolidated the already influential role, profile and authority of the UPA, which organised a large international conference held in Rome in March 2009.
