= Bashkir Nesterov Art Museum =

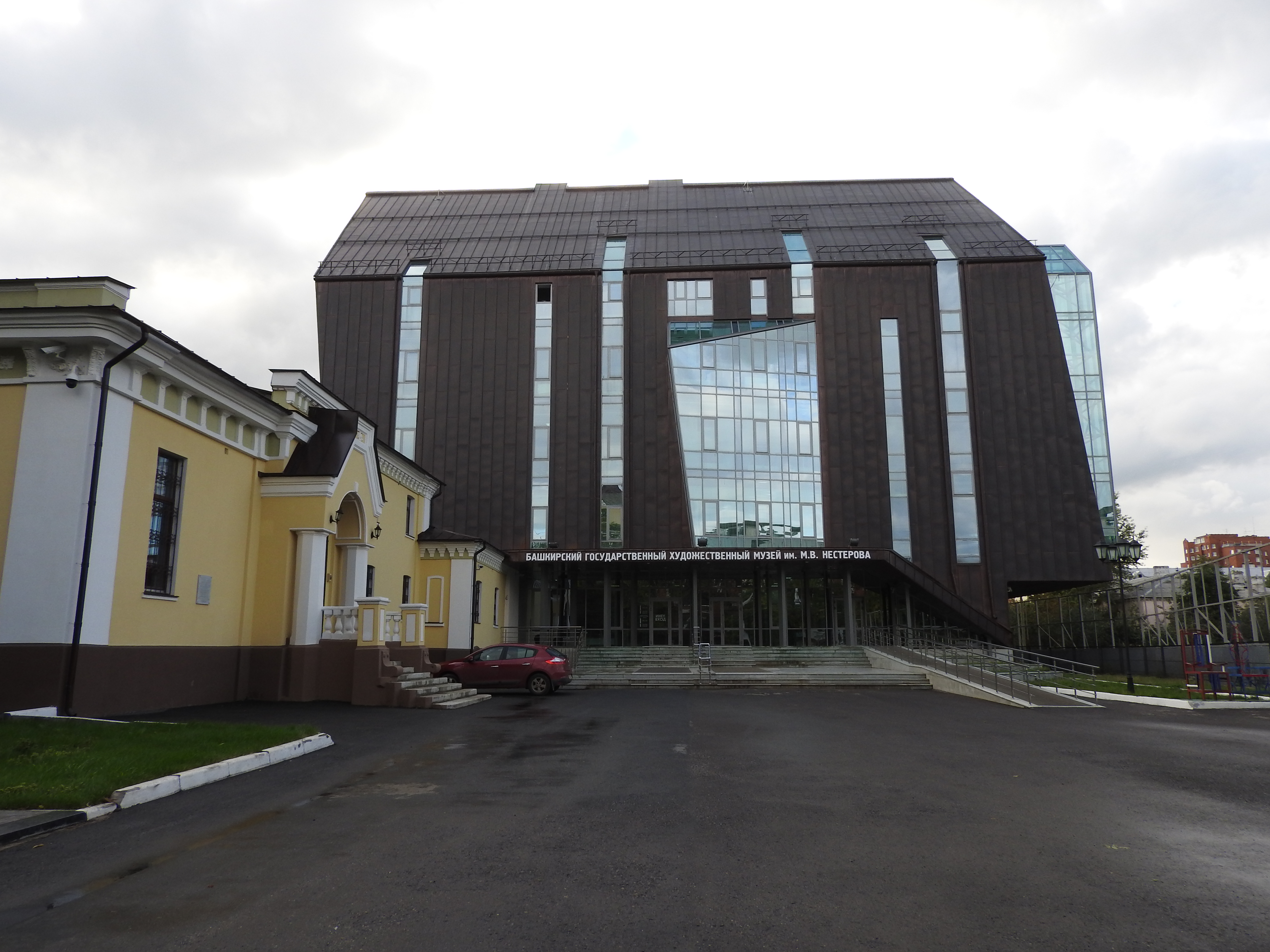
- Established: January 5, 1920; 106 years ago
- Location: 27 Gogol Street, Ufa, Bashkortostan, Russia
- Type: Art museum
- Website: http://museum-nesterov.ru/

The Bashkir Nesterov Art Museum is an art museum in Ufa, Bashkortostan, Russia. It was established in 1920 by the Government of Bashkortostan. The museum was named in honor of Mikhail Nesterov, a Russian painter and Ufa native.

The museum's collection includes works by David Burliuk, Alexey Kuznetsov, Ilya Repin, Mikhail Vrubel, Ivan Aivazovsky, Valentin Serov, Isaac Levitan, Alexei Savrasov, and Boris Kustodiev, among others.

== History ==
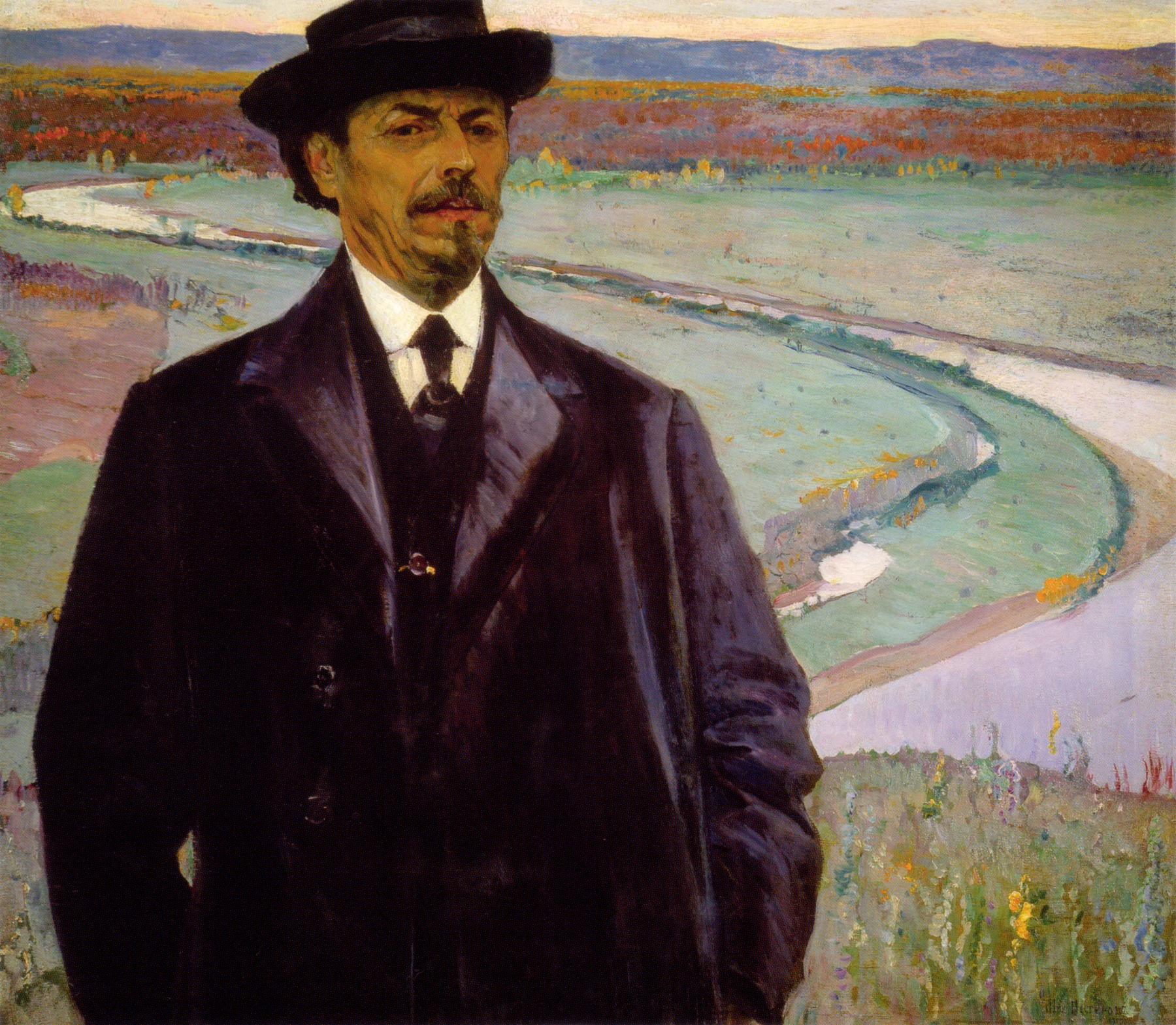
Mikhail Nesterov

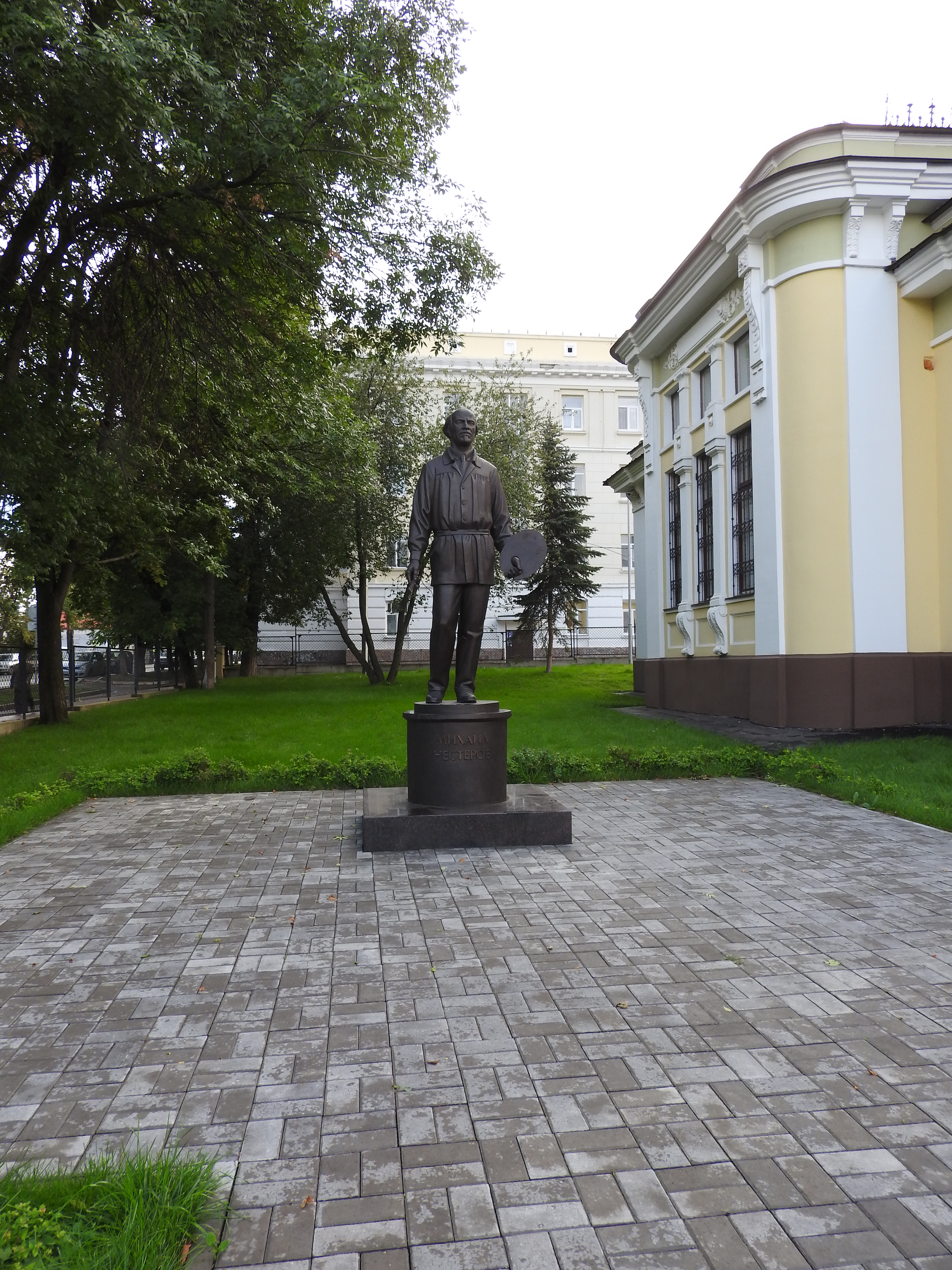
M.Nesterov Art Museum (Ufa)

In 1913 at Mikhail Nesterov, a native of Ufa, presented his native city with a unique collection of works by Russian painters of the second half of the 19th to the early 20th centuries, as well as about 30 of his own paintings. The collection included the works of such famous masters as Ivan Shishkin, Isaac Levitan, Nikolai Yaroshenko, Konstantin Korovin, Alexander Benois, Vasily Polenov, Abram Arkhipov and many others.

The exposition of the Ufa authorities was supposed to be placed on the squares under construction Aksakov's People's House (now the Opera and Ballet Theater), but its construction was significantly delayed due to the events of World War I and revolutions of 1917. Therefore, until 1919, the Nesterov assembly was kept in Moscow.

7 November 1919 and, after the liberation of Ufa from Kolchak's troops, the provincial Revolutionary Committee in Ufa established by special resolution the foundation of the October Revolution Artistic Proletarian Museum in the city. Since the Aksakov People's House was not completed, the house of the merchant-timber merchant M. A. Laptev was allocated for the museum.

The discovery was preceded by a difficult transportation of the Nesterov collection to Ufa from Moscow, through all of Russia destroyed by the Civil War. This case was entrusted to a friend and fellow countryman of the artist, the famous architect Ilya Bondarenko. Upon arrival in Ufa, he was entrusted with the management of the museum, which was opened for visiting in January 1920.

I.E. Bondarenko diligently searched for new works for the museum and by May 1920 the museum collection consisted of 1,500 exhibits, and the library – 2,500 volumes. In the 1920s and 1930s, the museum was actively replenished with exhibits from the Moscow and Petrograd museum funds. Then the works of Konstantin Korovin, Pavel Kuznetsov, Leonard Turzhansky, Ivan Kramskoy, Vasily Perov, Mikhail Vrubel, Valentin Serov, Mikhail Larionov, Natalia Goncharova and many other famous artists. Of particular value to the collection of ancient Russian painting were the icons received in 1921 through the Moscow Museum Fund from the largest collector and restorer Grigory Chirikov.

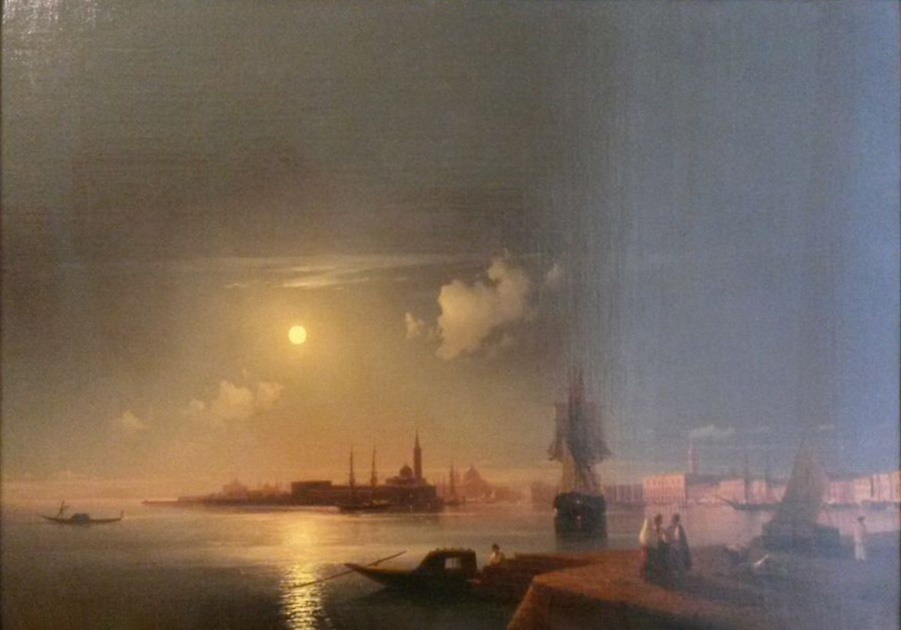
I.Aivazovsky Night in Venice

The exposition area of the museum is 391 m², the total number of storage units is more than 10,000 – paintings of early work Mikhail Nesterov, a collection of ancient Russian art and Russian painting from the 19th to the early 20th century, contemporary fine art and decorative and applied art Bashkiria are also presented, there is a collection Western European and Eastern art.

Museum Names: since 1919 Ufa Art Proletarian Museum named after The October Revolution, from 1921 the Ufa Art Proletarian Museum of Art, from 1922 the Ufa Art Museum, from 1929 the Bashkir State Art Museum (in 1954 it was named after M.V. Nesterov), since 1994 the State Art Museum named after M.V. Nesterov of the Republic of Bashkortostan, since 1998 the Bashkir State Art Museum named after M.V. Nesterov.

Museum address: 450077, Republic of Bashkortostan, Ufa, Gogol street, 27.

== Branches ==
- Meleuz (street Karl Marx, 68)
- Neftekamsk art gallery "Miras" (Neftekamsk, 89 Stroiteley St.)
- Sterlitamak Art Gallery (Sterlitamak, Kommunisticheskaya St., 84)
- Exhibition Hall "Izhad" (Ufa, Kosmonavtov St., 22)
- Picture gallery in the village Voskresenskoye Meleuzovsky district

== Collection ==
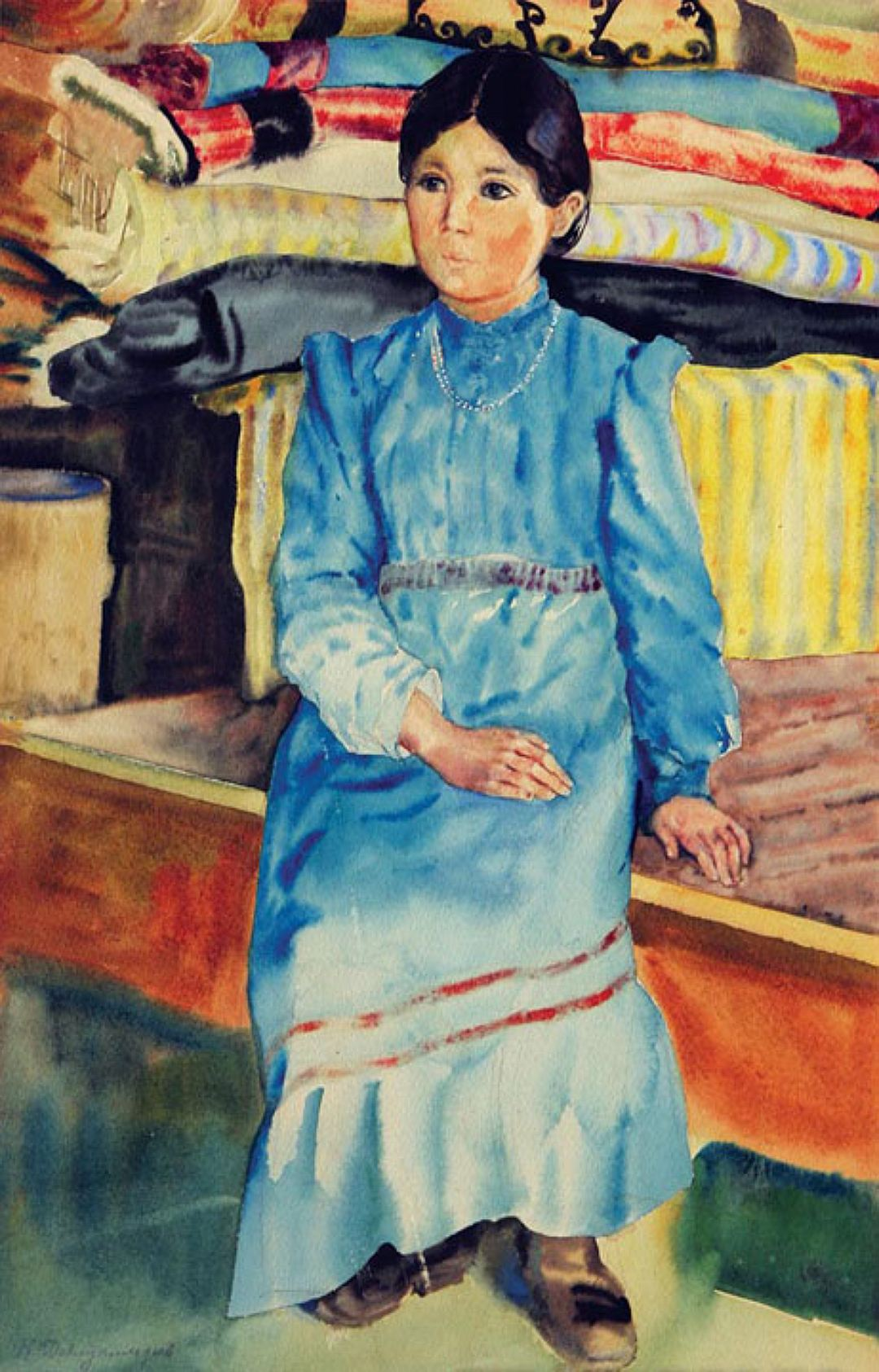
Bashkir girl in blue. K. Davletkildeev

Currently, the museum has paintings by famous artists of Bashkortostan Kassim Davletlkildeev, Alexander Tyulkin, David Burliuk, Rashit Nurmukhametov, Alexey Kuznetsov ‚ Akhmat Lutfullin, Fedor Kashcheev, Adia Sitdikova, R. Halitova, Boris Domashnikov, Alexander Burzyantsev, Alexander Panteleev, Vladimir Pustarnakova, graphic artists R. Gumerov, B. Palekhi, E. Saitov, Maria Yelgashtina, sculptures by Vera Morozova, Tamara Nechaeva, Boris Fuzeev, Alexander Shutova, works of masters of theatrical and decorative art Amir Arslanov, Galia Imasheva.

From domestic artists – paintings by M. Nesterov, Ilya Repin, Mikhail Vrubel, Ivan Aivazovsky, Valentin Serov, Isaac Levitan, Alexei Savrasov, Konstantin Korovin, drawings Boris Kustodiev, Eugene Lansere, F. Malyavin, sculpture by Pavel Antokolsky . The main value is 60 works of M. Nesterov donated to the museum.

Ancient icons, first-printed and manuscript books, objects of decorative art. Old Russian painting exhibited in the museum belongs to various icon painting schools. The museum exposition has two icons of the Deesis rank (rows in the iconostasis): "Our Lady" and "John the Baptist" by an unknown artist of the late 16th century. The museum's collection consists of more than 4,000 exhibits of all types of fine art. The scientific library has more than 10,000 books.

== Literature ==
- Bashkir State Art Museum named after M.V. Nesterov. E.P. Fenin. Ufa 1974
- Sorokina V. M. Distant dreams have come true // Museum World, 2002. – No. 5 (September–October). – S. 14–23 (with rep.).
- Sorokina V.M., Ignatenko S.V. Museum on the Belaya River // State Tretyakov Gallery, 2007. – No. 3. – P. 4-15 (with rep.). – Parall .: rus., Eng.
- Ignatenko S.V. Bashkir State Art Museum. M.V. Nesterova, Ufa // Art Gallery, 2008. – No. 170.
- Ignatenko S.V. Temple of the Arts. From the history. Museum today // Ufa. 435 years of creation: Catalog. – Ufa: Bashkir Press, 2008 .-- S. 45
- Mikhail Vasilievich Nesterov. Museum Collection: Reference Edition / Auth. V. M. Sorokina. – L .: Ivan Fedorov, 1997 .-- 40 p.
- The works of Mikhail Vasilyevich Nesterov. Painting and Graphics, 1878–1922: Unbroken album. Vol. I from the series “Bashkir State Art Museum. M. V. Nesterova "/ Auth. E.V. Khasanova; Scientific ed. S.V. Ignatenko. – Ufa: Informreklama, 2004 .-- 26 ed. l col. ill., text block 4 s.
- David Burliuk. The invoice and color. The works of David Burliuk in museums in the Russian province:
