= Portrait of Ivan Pavlov (Nesterov, 1930) =

1930 painting by Mikhail Nesterov

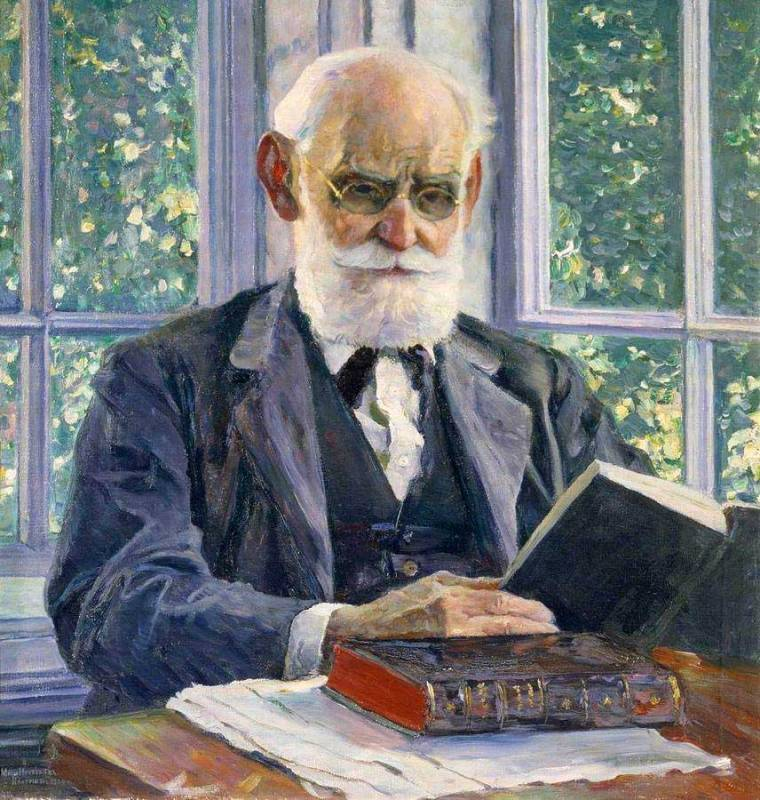
- Artist: Mikhail Nesterov
- Year: 1930
- Medium: Oil on canvas
- Dimensions: 80 cm × 77 cm (31 in × 30 in)
- Location: Russian Museum; St Petersburg

Portrait of Ivan Pavlov is an oil painting executed on canvas in 1930 by the Russian artist Mikhail Nesterov. It is in the collection of the Russian State Museum, in St Petersburg.

Ivan Pavlov was an acclaimed Russian physiologist known primarily for his work on classical conditioning, during which he developed the concept of the conditioned reflex. He was awarded the Nobel Prize for Physiology in 1904.

Although friends in the scientific community had tried unsuccessfully for several years to persuade Nesterov to paint the great man, when Nesterov met him in person he was instantly determined to create a portrait. He painted him working in the verandah of his house at Koltushi scientific “village” after which the work was acquired by the Institute of Experimental Medicine in St Petersburg at which Pavlov was head of the Physiology Department.

Nesterov later presented Pavlov with a duplicate copy of the painting, after which the original was donated to the Russian State Museum.

== See also ==
- List of paintings by Mikhail Nesterov
