= Halogen Foundation =

Singaporean non-profit

Halogen Foundation (Singapore) is an Institute of Public Character and not-for-profit organization in Singapore whose mission is to inspire and influence a generation of young people to lead themselves and others well.

== Origins ==
Halogen Foundation was started in 1997 in Australia originally called the Young Leaders Foundation. Its hallmark program is the National Young Leaders Days, an annual event initiated in 1997 to develop student leadership in schools. The Foundation exists in five major cities in Australia - Sydney, Melbourne, Brisbane, Adelaide, and Perth. It can also be found in New Zealand, incorporated under the Charitable Trusts Act 1957] and covering Auckland, Wellington, Christchurch, and Dunedin. It also has operations in Singapore where it is considered an Institute of Public Character.

National Young Leaders Day consists of a range of presenters, who aim to motivate young leaders in taking action in their schools and passing on the lessons they have learned on the day.

Halogen Foundation is endorsed by national leaders of the respective countries. Mr John Howard (Prime Minister of Australia), Mrs Helen Clark (Prime Minister of New Zealand), and Mr Teo Chee Hean (Minister of Defense of Singapore).
