= The Great Taking of the Veil =

Painting by Mikhail Nesterov

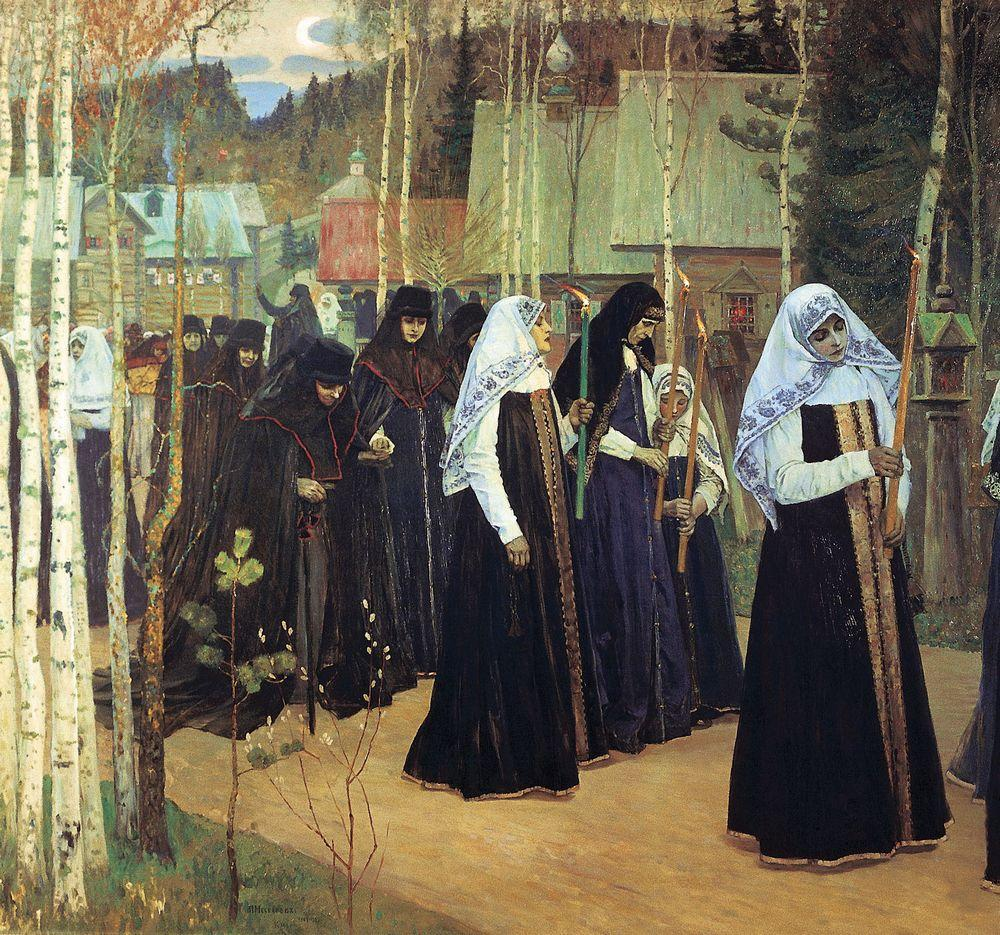
- Artist: Mikhail Nesterov
- Year: 1897–98
- Medium: Oil on canvas
- Dimensions: 178 cm × 195 cm (70 in × 77 in)
- Location: Russian Museum, Saint Petersburg

The Great Taking of the Veil is an oil-on-canvas painting executed in 1897–98 by the Russian Symbolist painter Mikhail Nesterov. It is now in the collection of the Russian Museum in Saint Petersburg.

The canvas depicts a solemn procession of nuns accompanying a novice to the taking of the veil in the Volga countryside, after which she would renounce her worldly life for a life of religious devotion in a nunnery.

In the artist's words: "The theme is sad, but the reviving nature, the Russian north, quiet and delicate ... makes the picture touching, at least for those who have a tender feeling". It ensured Nesterov's election in 1898 to the Russian Imperial Academy of Arts.

== See also ==
- 100 Great Paintings, 1980 BBC series
- List of paintings by Mikhail Nesterov
