= Feng Zhengjie =

Chinese artist (born 1968)

- 俸正杰
- Born: 1968 (age 57–58); Sichuan Province, China
- Known for: Painting
- Notable work: Portrait of China
- Style: Contemporary art

Feng Zhengjie
- Chinese: 俸正杰
Transcriptions
Standard Mandarin
- Hanyu Pinyin: Fèng Zhèngjié

Feng Zhengjie (Chinese: 俸正杰) (born 1968 in Sichuan Province, China) is an artist based in Beijing and Jeju Island of South Korea. Originally a high-school and college art teacher in Sichuan, he came to Beijing in 1995.

His best-known work is his Portrait of China series, very large Warhol-style oil portraits, in a red-and-turquoise palette, of Chinese fashion model faces with vacant diverging eyes (his signature style). Critics view his work as a critique of contemporary consumer society. His early paintings were inspired by 1930s Shanghai posters. His more recent work is based on the red and green of traditional Chinese New Year art, the colors made "more acid, a representation of the flashy, commercial nature of modern China".

Zhengjie has exhibited internationally in many shows including Dialogue With Asia at the Du Store Verden! -initiated Vika Gallery in Oslo, the 2002 Korea Contemporary Art Festival in Seoul, China Femmes de Chine at Veronique Maxe Gallery in Paris, Primary Colors at the Singapore Art Museum in Singapore and New Perspectives in Chinese Painting at Marella Gallery in Milan.

== Style ==
Feng Zhengjie's “exotically colorful style” is originated from a traditional drawing called “Mian Zhu Nian Hua,” which is created and used in a village in Si Chuan called “Mian Zhu.” Mian Zhu Nian Hua's first appearance can be traced back to Song Dynasty and it becomes very popular during Ming Dynasty and reaches its prime during Qing Dynasty. It reflects people's optimistic attitude toward life and work. In an interview, Feng said that he grew up in a very small village in Si Chuan province and the colorful traditional drawings reminded him of the memory of his childhood, which was also the main reason for him to start his unique drawing style. In his paintings, Feng loves to use very flashy colors such as pure bright red, bright pink and flashy green to draw the background and characters. Most characters in his drawings are females with sexy lips and vacant diverging eyes.

Removing all distraction, he exposes the essence of temptation, magnifying the sex appeal of fantasy lifestyle and its gulf of intangibility.

— Saatchi Gallery

Although Feng has been quite successful in the international art market these years, his brave usage of bright colors has drawn criticism. In Chinese culture, red, green, and pink colors are usually associated with the superficial and shallow; people also accuse Feng because they think he paints to meet the western taste as well as to make money. Despite all the negative opinions, Feng claims that he never considers making any changes and he will carry on this style to the end. According to him, any art piece that is designed to make an impression cannot be achieved with the idea of contrast. Feng denies that his drawings are satires or protests; instead, he says that his drawings are simply objective expression of the influence of consuming cultures on people. He has stated, "Today’s society is developing so rapidly in every aspects and following the development are more temptations. These temptations will make people unable to focus and confused. The dynamic motion of the ladies’ eyes portrays the fact that females can only catch up with what's going on around them by moving their eyes constantly."

I mostly try to find a way to express my emotions, not to criticize or be provocative. Behind these images of women in my works can be found firstly emotion but also forms of criticism, provocation, introspection... A new understanding of the world. Because I am a person who lives in this country at this moment. On the one hand, people watch a new world that has changed considerately. For example, they can acquire knowledge in the contact with these new things, improve their quality of life and have more opportunities to flourish. It positive. On the other hand, this new world also brings changes, not only material but also in value judgments. For example, feelings of anxiety in the face of extreme materialization. It's negative. My view is like a coin with two sides. My works convey a state of mind: curiosity and perplexity between which exists a conflict.

— Feng Zhengjie

== Opinion ==
Feng Zhengjie has continued his style, including during the 2008 economic crisis. When asked if he would regard the economic crisis as an opportunity to change his painting style, Feng said that he will not change his style to meet any change of other people’s taste. He has been painting for more than two decades and his style changes from time to time; however, he states that none of those changes is related to market considerations. He finds his confidence from working hard, and says he enjoys the changes he makes in his paintings. “A little change on the contour of a character’s nose will get me excited, but in the audience’s eyes this little change makes almost no difference at all. They simply cannot comprehend the joyfulness I have experienced during the painting. One can argue that artists are ‘selfish’ to certain extent. It is just like you watch a worker digging a hole on the ground. In your eyes the worker is doing the exactly same thing over and over again, but actually the worker digs to different depth every single time,” Feng explains.

== Solo exhibitions ==
- 2007
  - Paintings of Feng Zhengjie, Tilton Gallery, New York
- 2006
  - Paintings of Feng Zhengjie, Tokyo Gallery, Tokyo, Japan
  - Very Red and Very Green, Xin Dong Cheng Space for Contemporary Art, Beijing, China
  - A Beautiful Deception, Shine Art Space, Shanghai, China
- 2005
  - Paintings of Feng Zhengjie, Marella Gallery, Milan, Italy
  - Paintings of Feng Zhengjie, Goethe Art Center, Taichung, Taiwan
  - Paintings of Feng Zhengjie, Galerie De Bellecour, Lyon, France
- 2004
  - Kitsch As A Face of Chinese Society, Vanessa Art House, Jakarta, Indonesia; Soobin Art Gallery, Singapore
  - Kitsch As A Face Of Chinese Society, Soobin Art Gallery, Singapore
  - The Beautiful Poison, Suka Art Space, Korea
- 2003
  - Regards vers l'Est, Regards vers l"oust, Albert Benamou Gallery, Paris, France
- 2002
  - Paintings of Feng Zhengjie, M.K. Ciurlionis National Museum of Art, Kaunas, Lithuania Packaging, Xin Dong CHENG's Space for 2002 **International Contemporary Art, Beijing, China
- 2001
  - Coolness, Common Ground Art Gallery, Windsor, Canada
- 1996
  - Recounting of Skin, Art Museum of Capital Normal University, Beijing, China

== Appearances ==
Feng worked with Singaporean actor, Qi Yuwu, for the first time, for the inaugural Worlds Apart Fair in 2013.
