= Voskresenskoye, Meleuzovsky District, Republic of Bashkortostan =

Voskresenskoye Воскресенское
- Selo
- Location within Bashkortostan Location within Russia
- Coordinates: 53°07′N 56°08′E
- Country: Russia
- Region: Bashkortostan
- District: Meleuzovsky District
- Time zone: UTC+5:00

Voskresenskoye (Russian: Воскресенское) is a rural locality (a selo) and the administrative centre of Voskresensky Selsoviet, Meleuzovsky District, Bashkortostan, Russia. The population was 1,817 as of 2010. There are 34 streets.

== Geography ==
Voskresenskoye is located 25 km northeast of Meleuz (the district's administrative centre) by road. Kochkar is the nearest rural locality.
