= Bryan Koh =

Singaporean chef and author

- Citizenship: Singapore
- Education: National University of Singapore (BS); Cornell University (MA)
- Occupation: Food writer

Bryan Koh is a Singaporean chef and cookbook author, known for his writing on Southeast Asian cuisines.

== Early life and education ==
Koh's mother was born in Penang, Malaysia.

He attended the National University of Singapore for a bachelor's degree in mathematics, and later Cornell University for a master's degree in hospitality.

== Career ==
Bryan and his sister co-founded Chalk Farm, a cake company in Singapore.

In 2012, as Myanmar began to open to the international community, Koh's began research research for his book, 0451 Mornings are for Mont Hin Gar.

In 2019, he published Bekwoh, Stories & Recipes from Peninsula Malaysia's East Coast in 2019, focusing on the cuisine of Pahang, Terengganu, and Kelantan.

In 2019, he published Tamu: A Guest at the Bornean Table.

== Publications ==
- Milk Pigs and Violet Gold (2013)
- 0451 Mornings are for Mont Hin Gar: Burmese Food Stories (2015)
- Milkier Pigs & Violet Gold: Philippine Food Stories (2016)
- Bekwoh: Stories & Recipes from Peninsula Malaysia’s East Coast (2019)
- Tamu: A Guest at the Bornean Table (2022)
- Mornings are for Mohinga, Regional Burmese Food (2025)
