= Yevsey Moiseyenko =

Russian painter

- Born: Yevsey Yevseyevich Moiseyenko; 28 August 1916; Uvarovichi, Gomelsky Uyezd, Mogilev Governorate, Russian Empire
- Died: 29 November 1988 (aged 72); Leningrad, RSFSR, Soviet Union
- Education: Repin Institute of Arts
- Notable work: Mothers, Sisters (1967); Cherry (1969)
- Movement: Realism
- Awards: Hero of Socialist Labour (1986)

Yevsey Yevseyevich Moiseyenko (Russian: Евсей Евсеевич Моисеенко; 28 August [O.S. 15 August] 1916 – 29 November 1988) was a Soviet and Russian painter and pedagogue. People's Painter of the USSR (1970) and Hero of Socialist Labour (1986).

== Biography ==
Since 1936 Moiseenko lived in Leningrad. He was trained at the Academy of Arts under Alexander Osmerkin and taught at the Academy from 1947, becoming a professor in 1957. Moiseyenko developed the theme of romantic heroism, which can be seen his paintings such as The Reds Came, 1961; Comrades, 1964; Cherry, 1969; all of which are exhibited in the State Russian Museum in Saint Petersburg.

Yevsey Moiseyenko. The Reds came. 1961

In 1974, Moiseyenko was awarded the Lenin Prize. The poetry of the village and city landscapes is demonstrated in Tulsky Lane, Leningrad, 1963, (in the State Russian Museum), while Boys, painted in 1974 and exhibited in the Tretyakov Gallery, captures the romanticism of youth.

He also painted portraits: portrait of artist A. A. Osmerkin, 1970; portrait of art historian G. V. Kekusheva, 1971, exhibited at the State Russian Museum and still-lives. The series of paintings Memory (1976–1980) was awarded the USSR State Prize in 1983. During the last years of his life he worked on a series devoted to Alexander Pushkin, to the Poet's Memory, 1985. He lived on 56 Suvorovsky Avenue, where a memorial plaque is located. He was buried at Literatorskie Mostki in the Volkovo Cemetery.

== See also ==
- Fine Art of Leningrad
- Leningrad School of Painting
- List of 20th-century Russian painters
- List of painters of Saint Petersburg Union of Artists
- List of Russian artists
- Saint Petersburg Union of Artists

== Sources ==
- Кекушева-Новосадюк Г. В. Евсей Евсеевич Моисеенко. Л., 1977;
- Леонова Н. Г. Евсей Моисеенко. Л., 1989.
