= Cherry (painting) =

1969 painting by Yevsey Moiseyenko

- Artist: Yevsey Moiseyenko
- Year: 1969
- Medium: Oil on canvas
- Dimensions: 187 cm × 275 cm (75 in × 100 in)
- Location: State Russian Museum; Leningrad

Cherry (Russian: «Черешня») is an oil painting on canvas painted in 1969 by Russian artist Yevsey Moiseyenko (1916–1988).

== History ==
Cherry has been described as a philosophical essay about evil and good of the war. It is one of the most important works by Moiseyenko. It belongs to the series called "Years of Fighting" – a historical epopee, which brought the Lenin Prize to the artist in 1974. It was again a theme of Russian Civil War in this painting (before there were Cavalry the First (1957), Here Reds are (1961), Friends (1964), Son (1969) and others). Moiseyenko began to make studies for his painting from 1967. He made a few variants of Cherry. The last one took a year. Cherry was presented for the first time at the largest exhibition, the "Fine Arts of Leningrad" in Moscow, 1976. The Russian Museum has Cherry in its collection.

As a subject Moiseyenko selected a very peaceable and idyllic episode of war in which it seems as if the soldiers have forgotten about death, which was not far from them. There are not the sabres in their hands but cherry. Moiseyenko allocated his main heroes in the top of the hill and divided the composition to the separate scenes, dissolving the border between an external space and a lyric reflection. There is a ring of friendship in the circular position of their figures. All of them are very young but their faces show strength of mind and courage. The foreground and background are from different times: There is a peaceful life of towns and villages in a condensed space of the background. It belongs to the time of dreams. "Silence. Pause. Maybe, at noon there, behind the hill, they will lie down into this caressing grass... They are pure-minded dreamers and with a great idea," the author explained his message.

== See also ==
- Leningrad School of Painting
- 1969 in art

== Bibliography ==
- Изобразительное искусство Ленинграда. Каталог выставки. Л., Художник РСФСР, 1976. C.23.
- Кекушева, Г. В. Евсей Моисеенко. Альбом. — М.: Сов. художник, 1981.
- Ганеева, В., Гусев, В., Цветова, А. Изобразительное искусство Ленинграда. Выставка произведений ленинградских художников. Москва. Ноябрь 1976 — январь 1977. — Л.: Художник РСФСР, 1981. — С. 88–89.
- Кекушева, Г. В. Картина Е. Е. Моисеенко «Матери, сёстры». Путь к картине / Альбом. — Л.: Художник РСФСР, 1982.
- Герман, М. Вселенная живописца // Евсей Евсеевич Моисеенко. Каталог выставки. — Л., Художник РСФСР, 1982. — С. 15.
- Новожилова, Л. И., авт. вступ. ст. // Евсей Евсеевич Моисеенко. Каталог выставки. — Л., Художник РСФСР, 1982. — С. 7.
- Герман, М. Евсей Моисеенко // Искусство Советского Союза. Альбом. — Л.: Аврора, 1985. — С. 520–521.
- Справочник членов Ленинградской организации Союза художников РСФСР. — Л.: Художник РСФСР, 1987. — С. 88.
- Каменский, А. А. Романтический монтаж. — М.: Сов. художник, 1989. — С. 317.
- Литовченко, Е. Н. Евсей Евсеевич Моисеенко. 1916—1988. Живопись. Графика. Каталог выставки. — СПб.: НИМРАХ, 2006. — С. 13–14.
- Юбилейный справочник выпускников Санкт-Петербургского академического института живописи, скульптуры и архитектуры имени И. Е. Репина Российской Академии художеств. 1915—2005. — СПб.: Первоцвет, 2007.
- Литовченко, Е. Н. Е. Е. Моисеенко. «Коллекция из мастерской». Живопись, рисунок. — СПб.: Ист. иллюстрация, 2012. — С. 520–521.
