= Alexei Stupin =

Russian publisher and bookseller

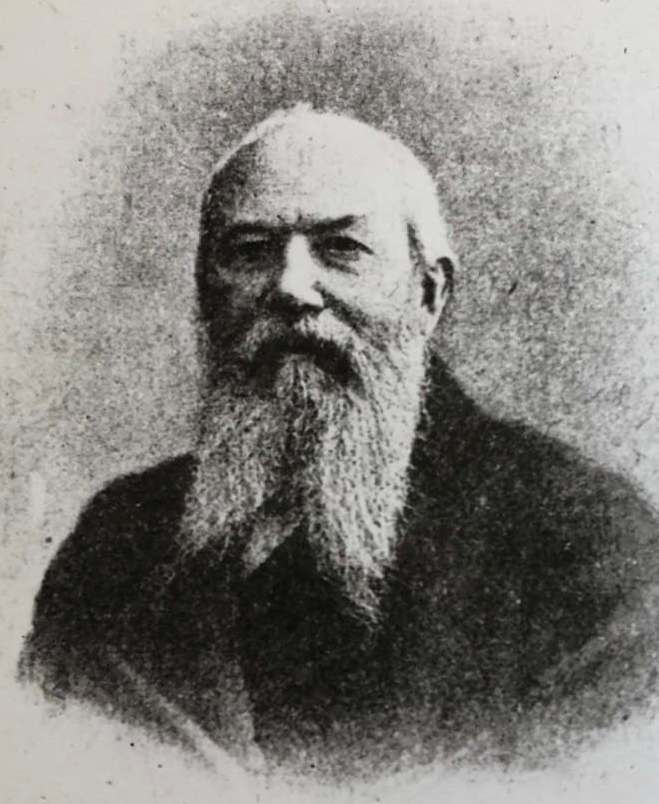
Alexei Stupin (date unknown)

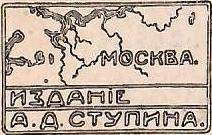
His company's logo

Alexei Dmitrievich Stupin (Russian: Алексей Дмитриевич Ступин; (12 February 1844, Serpukhov – 1915, Moscow) was a publisher and bookseller from the Russian Empire. His company was one of the first in Moscow, and the largest in the late 19th century.

== Life and work ==
His career began in a bookstore owned by Pyotr Sharapov, as a contracted sales agent and manager, working on commission. He asked Sharapov for permission to publish an illustrated tutorial on dancing, a subject of interest to him, and was allowed to do so. The book went through several editions, prompting him to ask Sharapov for a release from his contract, so he could open his own publishing firm.

He rented a small shop, but soon found it necessary to expand; renting some space in a nearby church, where he set up a warehouse. His business grew even more rapidly, as he was also a commissioned agent for the synodal publishing house, many of whose books were required purchases for the clergy. In addition, many of his books were educational in nature, so he received recommendations from the Ministry of National Education and the Office of the Institutions of Empress Maria. These played a significant role in increasing his sales to libraries.

His original catalog contained a variety of subjects, including popular, religious, folk, artistic, reference and educational works. He was especially well known for his children's books, including a series known as the Библиотечка Ступина (Stupin Library), containing fairy tales, historical stories, travels, popular essays about the life of nature, and games. Each volume had a press run from 2,000 to 10,000 copies. Toward the end of the century, he began to focus on works of literature, both Russian and Western European. In 1889, he published his first annual Современный календарь (Modern Calendar).

He enjoyed filling his books with engraved illustrations, and paid his illustrators very well, although he was quite demanding and would personally oversee every step of the process; from the materials used to the printing method. Only the most prestigious printing companies were employed, and their bills were always paid in full.

His exact date of death is unrecorded, due to its occurrence during the Great Retreat, and his grave at Vagankovo Cemetery has since been lost. His son, Alexei, inherited the company, and attempted to continue as before, but it ceased operations permanently in 1918.
