= Mothers, Sisters =

Painting by Yevsey Moiseyenko

- Artist: Yevsey Moiseyenko
- Year: 1967
- Medium: Oil on canvas
- Dimensions: 200 cm × 257 cm (80 in × 102 in)
- Location: State Russian Museum; Saint-Petersburg

Mothers, Sisters (Russian: «Матери, сёстры») is a 1967 painting by Russian artist Yevsey Moiseyenko (1916–1988).

== History ==
Painted in 1967, Mothers, Sisters was devoted to the destiny of Russian women in the years of the Great Patriotic War. It was created in five months, but its idea was born at the beginning of the Russo-German war in 1941 and based on the artist's personal knowledge. "I remember my mother when she saw me to the war and how I came in and went away the villages when I was a soldier. I couldn't forget the women's eyes. I wanted to peep into them with my outgoing look," Moiseyenko reminisced. The first sketch was made by the artist in 1965. Later he refined it in numerous preparatory sketches. There are many of these sketches in the Museum of the Russian Academy of Arts. He made them in the 1960s in his native village of Uvarovichi, where he found the female characters for the painting. Among them are Woman with Girl, Lyuba, Nastya and many others. The first variant of the painting was a big canvas, At the Collective Farm`s Yard (oil on canvas, 200х257. 1966). The second version was named Mothers, Sisters. Mothers, Sisters was first presented at the largest exhibition called "Soviet Russia" in Moscow in 1967 and later in a large exhibition devoted to the fiftieth anniversary of the October Revolution, also in Moscow. The Leningrad Union of Soviet Artists and the Leningrad Culture Committee awarded this painting the Medal "For the Best Painting of the Year". The work is dedicated to Moiseyenko's mother. Her destiny was typical for the war times. She went four years without even a letter from her son. Moiseyenko painted her image as an old woman, although she was young at the time of the war. Using the innovative experience of Soviet painting, especially an advancement of Aleksandr Deyneka, Moiseyenko applied the method of assembly composition in Mothers, Sisters. The picture portrays some women saying goodbye to men leaving for the front. A lorry carrying soldiers has just driven off. Only women - mothers, sisters, wives - are standing on the road. The expressions on their faces convey a variety of feelings: uncomplaining grief, fortitude and readiness for hardship and struggle. A well-known art-critic, Mikhail German, characterized Mothers, Sisters as one of the most powerful and tragic of Moiseyenko's paintings. The Russian Museum has Mothers, Sisters in its collection.

== See also ==
- Leningrad School of Painting

== Bibliography ==
- Третья республиканская художественная выставка «Советская Россия». — М.: Сов. художник, 1967.
- Горин, И. Современная историческая живопись. Очерки современного советского искусства. — М., 1975.
- Изобразительное искусство Ленинграда. Каталог выставки. — Л.: Художник РСФСР, 1976. — С. 23.
- Кекушева-Новосадюк, Г. В. Евсей Евсеевич Моисеенко. — Л., 1977. — C. 33—37.
- Кекушева, Г. В. Евсей Моисеенко. Альбом. — М.: Сов. художник, 1981.
- Ганеева, В., Гусев, В., Цветова, А. Изобразительное искусство Ленинграда. Выставка произведений ленинградских художников. Москва. Ноябрь 1976 — январь 1977. — Л.: Художник РСФСР, 1981. — С. 88—89.
- Кекушева, Г. В. Картина Е. Е. Моисеенко «Матери, сёстры». Путь к картине / Альбом. — Л.: Художник РСФСР, 1982.
- Герман, М. Вселенная живописца // Евсей Евсеевич Моисеенко. Каталог выставки. — Л.: Художник РСФСР, 1982. — С. 15.
- Новожилова, Л.И. // Евсей Евсеевич Моисеенко. Каталог выставки. — Л.: Художник РСФСР, 1982. — С. 7—8.
- Евсей Евсеевич Моисеенко. Каталог выставки. / Вступ. ст. Л. И. Новожиловой. — Л.: Художник РСФСР, 1982. — С. 8.
- Герман, М. Евсей Моисеенко // Искусство Советского Союза. Альбом. — Л.: Аврора, 1985. — С. 520.
- Справочник членов Ленинградской организации Союза художников РСФСР. — Л.: Художник РСФСР, 1987. — С. 88.
- Каменский, А. А. Романтический монтаж. — М.: Сов. художник, 1989. — С. 317.
- Литовченко, Е. Н. Евсей Евсеевич Моисеенко. 1916—1988. Живопись. Графика. Каталог выставки. — СПб.: НИМРАХ, 2006. — 78 с.
- Юбилейный справочник выпускников Санкт-Петербургского академического института живописи, скульптуры и архитектуры имени И. Е. Репина Российской Академии художеств. 1915—2005. — СПб.: Первоцвет, 2007.
- Литовченко, Е. Н. Е. Е. Моисеенко. «Коллекция из мастерской». Живопись, рисунок. — СПб.: Ист. иллюстрация, 2012. — 240 с.
