= Nikolai Galakhov =

Russian painter (1928–2022)

Nikolai Nikolaevich Galakhov
- Born: 29 May 1928; Kazan, USSR
- Died: 1 March 2022 (aged 93)
- Education: Repin Institute of Arts
- Known for: Painting
- Movement: Realism
- Awards: Honored Artist of the Russian Federation

Nikolai Nikolaevich Galakhov (Russian: Никола́й Никола́евич Гала́хов; 29 May 1928 – 1 March 2022) was a Russian artist. He was an Honored Artist of the Russian Federation, a member of the Saint Petersburg Union of Artists (before 1992 the Leningrad branch of Union of Artists of Russian Federation). Living and working in Saint Petersburg, he was regarded as one of the representatives of the Leningrad School of Painting, and is most famous for his landscape paintings.

== Biography ==
Nikolai Galakhov was born on 29 May 1928 in Kazan city, Tatar Republic, USSR, on the Volga River. In 1942 he entered the Kazan Art School, graduating in 1947. In the same year he moved to Leningrad and was admitted to the first course of Department of Painting of the Leningrad Institute of Painting, Sculpture and Architecture named after Ilya Repin. He studied of Leonid Ovsannikov, Joseph Serebriany, Piotr Belousov, Yuri Neprintsev.

In 1953 Nikolai Galakhov graduated from the Repin Institute of Arts in Rudolf Frentz workshop. His graduation work was a genre painting named "Poet Nikolai Nekrasov on the Volga River", dedicated to Nikolai Nekrasov, a prominent Russian poet, writer, critic and publisher of the 19th century (painting now resides in the Museum of the Academy of Arts in Saint Petersburg).

In 1954–1956 Galakhov continued his postgraduate study in the Repin Institute of Arts. Since 1951 Galakhov had participated in Art Exhibitions, mostly as a master of landscape and genre scene. He worked in the techniques of oil painting, tempera, pastel, watercolor and pencil drawing. From 1953 Galakhov also started painting pictures on contract. In 1955 for series landscapes of the Volga River he was admitted to the Leningrad Union of Soviet Artists.

In the 1950s the leading place in Galakhov's art belonged to landscapes of the Volga River. He traveled on the Russian rivers Volga, Vetluga, Vyatka, where he painted a lot sketches from the life. His paintings are sustained in the strict, almost classical, tradition of Russian landscape painting. This is indicated by the work shown in exhibitions, such as "Landing stage on the Volga River", "Evening. Kama mouth" (both 1954), "July" (1955), "Port on the Volga River. Evening", "Blooming meadows on the Volga River" (both 1956), "The Storm under the Volga River", "On the Volga River" (both 1957), "Construction of the Kuibyshev Hydroelectric Station" (1957), "Autumn on the Volga River" (1957) and others.

In the late 1950s Galakhov traveled to Siberia and Baikal Lake. This led him to new experiences, embodied in numerous sketches from the life and landscape paintings, such as "The Village in Siberia" (1959), "On the shore of Baykal Lake", "At The crossing", "Siberian Village" (all 1960), "Soon alloy" (1961), "Construction in Siberia" (1962) and others. These travels helped him to diversify his palette and to understand the plastic characteristics of different places, gave new impetus to picturesque searches and preparing for a meeting with Karelia, which became a turning point in his work.

In the 1960s Galakhov discovered Karelia. He painted numerous sketches and paintings devoted to the nature and the present day of this region. Although Galakhov created a lot of genre paintings (among them "On the roads of Karelia", "Yuma lumber station in Karelia", "Forest Weekday", "Forest Master", and others), most of his work was still landscapes. He was particularly attracted to the wild parts of northern nature, untouched by civilization. He knows how to show us her fragile beauty and majesty. Among the famous works of this period were "The Village of Umba" (1969), "Karelia. The beginning of winter" (1973), "White Night in Karelia" (1974), "Northern Summer" (1977), "Kem. Winter is coming" (1978), "Old Church in Kem" (1982), "Northern Spring" (1984) and many others.

In his works Nikolai Galakhov consistently advocated the principles of picture-landscape, with well-developed plot basis and elements of the genre. His methods of realization of pictorial ideas are near to the works of known Russian landscape painter Arcady Rylov.

In 1984 Nikolai Galakhov was awarded the honorary title of Honored Artist of Russian Federation. Solo Exhibitions by Nikolai Galakhov were in Leningrad (1988) and Saint Petersburg (2010, 2013).

Paintings by Nikolai Nikolaevich Galakhov reside in State Russian Museum, State Tretyakov Gallery, in the lot of Art museums and private collections in Russia, China, England, in the U.S., Japan, and in other countries.

Galakhov died on 1 March 2022, at the age of 93.

== See also ==
- Fine Art of Leningrad
- Leningrad School of Painting
- List of Russian artists
- List of 20th-century Russian painters
- List of painters of Saint Petersburg Union of Artists
- List of the Russian Landscape painters
- Saint Petersburg Union of Artists

== Exhibitions ==
Principal Exhibitions by Nikolai Galakhov
- 1951 (Leningrad): Exhibition of works by Leningrad artists of 1951, with Piotr Alberti, Vsevolod Bazhenov, Piotr Belousov, Piotr Buchkin, Rudolf Frentz, Nikolai Galakhov, Vladimir Gorb, Tatiana Kopnina, Nikolai Kostrov, Anna Kostrova, Alexander Lubimov, Evsey Moiseenko, Mikhail Natarevich, Yuri Neprintsev, Vladimir Ovchinnikov, Sergei Osipov, Alexander Pushnin, Ivan Savenko, Gleb Savinov, Alexander Samokhvalov, Vladimir Seleznev, Alexander Shmidt, Nadezhda Shteinmiller, Nikolai Timkov, Leonid Tkachenko, Mikhail Tkachev, Yuri Tulin, Igor Veselkin, Nina Veselova, Rostislav Vovkushevsky, Vecheslav Zagonek, and other important Leningrad artists.
- 1954 (Leningrad): Spring Exhibition of works by Leningrad artists of 1954, with Evgenia Antipova, Nikolai Baskakov, Sergei Frolov, Nikolai Galakhov, Vladimir Gorb, Maya Kopitseva, Boris Korneev, Elena Kostenko, Anna Kostrova, Gevork Kotiantz, Valeria Larina, Boris Lavrenko, Ivan Lavsky, Gavriil Malish, Alexei Mozhaev, Nikolai Mukho, Samuil Nevelshtein, Yuri Neprintsev, Sergei Osipov, Lev Russov, Ivan Savenko, Vladimir Seleznev, Arseny Semionov, Alexander Shmidt, Elena Skuin, Victor Teterin, Nikolai Timkov, Mikhail Tkachev, Leonid Tkachenko, Vecheslav Zagonek, and other important Leningrad artists.
- 1956 (Leningrad): Autumn Exhibition of works by Leningrad artists of 1956, with Piotr Alberti, Taisia Afonina, Vsevolod Bazhenov, Irina Baldina, Nikolai Baskakov, Yuri Belov, Piotr Belousov, Piotr Buchkin, Sergei Frolov, Nikolai Galakhov, Vladimir Gorb, Abram Grushko, Alexei Eriomin, Mikhail Kaneev, Marina Kozlovskaya, Tatiana Kopnina, Maya Kopitseva, Boris Korneev, Alexander Koroviakov, Elena Kostenko, Nikolai Kostrov, Anna Kostrova, Gevork Kotiantz, Yaroslav Krestovsky, Ivan Lavsky, Oleg Lomakin, Dmitry Maevsky, Gavriil Malish, Alexei Mozhaev, Nikolai Mukho, Samuil Nevelshtein, Sergei Osipov, Vladimir Ovchinnikov, Lev Russov, Ivan Savenko, Gleb Savinov, Vladimir Seleznev, Alexander Semionov, Arseny Semionov, Yuri Shablikin, Boris Shamanov, Alexander Shmidt, Nadezhda Shteinmiller, Victor Teterin, Nikolai Timkov, Mikhail Tkachev, Mikhail Trufanov, Yuri Tulin, Piotr Vasiliev, Igor Veselkin, Rostislav Vovkushevsky, Vecheslav Zagonek, Ruben Zakharian, Sergei Zakharov, and other important Leningrad artists.
- 1957 (Leningrad): 1917 – 1957. Leningrad Artist's works of Art Exhibition, with Evgenia Antipova, Vsevolod Bazhenov, Irina Baldina, Nikolai Baskakov, Piotr Belousov, Piotr Buchkin, Zlata Bizova, Vladimir Chekalov, Sergei Frolov, Nikolai Galakhov, Abram Grushko, Alexei Eriomin, Mikhail Kaneev, Engels Kozlov, Tatiana Kopnina, Maya Kopitseva, Boris Korneev, Alexander Koroviakov, Nikolai Kostrov, Anna Kostrova, Gevork Kotiantz, Yaroslav Krestovsky, Boris Lavrenko, Ivan Lavsky, Oleg Lomakin, Dmitry Maevsky, Gavriil Malish, Alexei Mozhaev, Evsey Moiseenko, Nikolai Mukho, Mikhail Natarevich, Samuil Nevelshtein, Dmitry Oboznenko, Lev Orekhov, Sergei Osipov, Vladimir Ovchinnikov, Nikolai Pozdneev, Alexander Pushnin, Lev Russov, Galina Rumiantseva, Ivan Savenko, Gleb Savinov, Alexander Samokhvalov, Arseny Semionov, Alexander Mikhailovich Semionov, Boris Shamanov, Alexander Shmidt, Nadezhda Shteinmiller, Galina Smirnova, Victor Teterin, Nikolai Timkov, Mikhail Tkachev, Leonid Tkachenko, Yuri Tulin, Ivan Varichev, Nina Veselova, Rostislav Vovkushevsky, Anatoli Vasiliev, Lazar Yazgur, Vecheslav Zagonek, Ruben Zakharian, Sergei Zakharov, Maria Zubreeva, and other important Leningrad artists.
- 1957 (Moscow): All-Union Art Exhibition of 1957 dedicated to the 40th Anniversary of October Revolution, with Vsevolod Bazhenov, Nikolai Baskakov, Irina Baldina, Piotr Belousov, Piotr Buchkin, Zlata Bizova, Nikolai Galakhov, Elena Gorokhova, Alexei Eriomin, Engels Kozlov, Maya Kopitseva, Boris Korneev, Boris Lavrenko, Oleg Lomakin, Nikita Medovikov, Evsey Moiseenko, Mikhail Natarevich, Samuil Nevelshtein, Yuri Neprintsev, Dmitry Oboznenko, Vladimir Ovchinnikov, Nikolai Pozdneev, Alexander Pushnin, Ivan Savenko, Gleb Savinov, Alexander Samokhvalov, Alexander Semionov, Nadezhda Shteinmiller, Victor Teterin, Nikolai Timkov, Mikhail Trufanov, Yuri Tulin, Ivan Varichev, Piotr Vasiliev, Nina Veselova, Vecheslav Zagonek, Sergei Zakharov, Maria Zubreeva, and other important Leningrad artists.
- 1958 (Leningrad): The Fall Exhibition of works by Leningrad artists of 1958, with Taisia Afonina, Irina Baldina, Evgenia Baykova, Vsevolod Bazhenov, Piotr Belousov, Yuri Belov, Zlata Bizova, Sergei Frolov, Nikolai Galakhov, Elena Gorokhova, Abram Grushko, Alexei Eriomin, Mikhail Kaneev, Marina Kozlovskaya, Tatiana Kopnina, Boris Korneev, Alexander Koroviakov, Elena Kostenko, Nikolai Kostrov, Anna Kostrova, Gevork Kotiantz, Yaroslav Krestovsky, Valeria Larina, Boris Lavrenko, Ivan Lavsky, Piotr Litvinsky, Oleg Lomakin, Dmitry Maevsky, Gavriil Malish, Alexei Mozhaev, Evsey Moiseenko, Nikolai Mukho, Anatoli Nenartovich, Yuri Neprintsev, Dmitry Oboznenko, Sergei Osipov, Vladimir Ovchinnikov, Nikolai Pozdneev, Alexander Pushnin, Maria Rudnitskaya, Galina Rumiantseva, Lev Russov, Ivan Savenko, Gleb Savinov, Alexander Samokhvalov, Arseny Semionov, Alexander Semionov, Yuri Shablikin, Boris Shamanov, Alexander Shmidt, Nadezhda Shteinmiller, Elena Skuin, Alexander Sokolov, Nikolai Timkov, Yuri Tulin, Ivan Varichev, Anatoli Vasiliev, Piotr Vasiliev, Igor Veselkin, Vecheslav Zagonek, and other important Leningrad artists.
- 1960 (Leningrad): Exhibition of works by Leningrad artists of 1960, with Piotr Alberti, Evgenia Antipova, Taisia Afonina, Genrikh Bagrov, Vsevolod Bazhenov, Nikolai Baskakov, Zlata Bizova, Nikolai Galakhov, Vladimir Gorb, Abram Grushko, German Yegoshin, Alexei Eriomin, Mikhail Kaneev, Mikhail Kozell, Marina Kozlovskaya, Boris Korneev, Alexander Koroviakov, Elena Kostenko, Nikolai Kostrov, Anna Kostrova, Gevork Kotiantz, Yaroslav Krestovsky, Boris Lavrenko, Ivan Lavsky, Oleg Lomakin, Dmitry Maevsky, Alexei Mozhaev, Evsey Moiseenko, Nikolai Mukho, Andrei Mylnikov, Piotr Nazarov, Vera Nazina, Mikhail Natarevich, Samuil Nevelshtein, Dmitry Oboznenko, Sergei Osipov, Nikolai Pozdneev, Maria Rudnitskaya, Vladimir Sakson, Alexander Samokhvalov, Alexander Semionov, Arseny Semionov, Yuri Shablikin, Boris Shamanov, Alexander Shmidt, Elena Skuin, Alexander Sokolov, Alexander Stolbov, Victor Teterin, Nikolai Timkov, Yuri Tulin, Ivan Varichev, Rostislav Vovkushevsky, Vecheslav Zagonek, Ruben Zakharian, and other important Leningrad artists.
- 1960 (Leningrad): Exhibition of works by Leningrad artists of 1960, with Piotr Alberti, Evgenia Antipova, Taisia Afonina, Vsevolod Bazhenov, Irina Baldina, Nikolai Baskakov, Leonid Baykov, Yuri Belov, Piotr Belousov, Zlata Bizova, Mikhail Bobyshov, Olga Bogaevskaya, Lev Bogomolets, Nikolai Brandt, Dmitry Buchkin, Piotr Buchkin, Vladimir Chekalov, Sergei Frolov, Nikolai Galakhov, Ivan Godlevsky, Vladimir Gorb, Elena Gorokhova, Abram Grushko, Oleg Eremeev, Alexei Eriomin, Mikhail Kaneev, Engels Kozlov, Marina Kozlovskaya, Tatiana Kopnina, Maya Kopitseva, Boris Korneev, Alexander Koroviakov, Elena Kostenko, Nikolai Kostrov, Anna Kostrova, Gevork Kotiantz, Vladimir Krantz, Yaroslav Krestovsky, Valeria Larina, Boris Lavrenko, Ivan Lavsky, Anatoli Levitin, Piotr Litvinsky, Oleg Lomakin, Dmitry Maevsky, Gavriil Malish, Evsey Moiseenko, Nikolai Mukho, Andrei Mylnikov, Vera Nazina, Mikhail Natarevich, Anatoli Nenartovich, Samuil Nevelshtein, Dmitry Oboznenko, Vladimir Ovchinnikov, Vecheslav Ovchinnikov, Sergei Osipov, Filaret Pakun, Genrikh Pavlovsky, Varlen Pen, Nikolai Pozdneev, Stepan Privedentsev, Alexander Pushnin, Lev Russov, Galina Rumiantseva, Maria Rudnitskaya, Ivan Savenko, Vladimir Sakson, Gleb Savinov, Alexander Samokhvalov, Alexander Semionov, Arseny Semionov, Yuri Shablikin, Boris Shamanov, Alexander Shmidt, Nadezhda Shteinmiller, Elena Skuin, Galina Smirnova, Alexander Sokolov, Alexander Stolbov, Victor Teterin, Nikolai Timkov, Mikhail Tkachev, Leonid Tkachenko, Mikhail Trufanov, Yuri Tulin, Boris Ugarov, Ivan Varichev, Anatoli Vasiliev, Valery Vatenin, Nina Veselova, Rostislav Vovkushevsky, German Yegoshin, Vecheslav Zagonek, Sergei Zakharov, Ruben Zakharian, Elena Zhukova, and other important Leningrad artists.
- 1961 (Leningrad): Exhibition of works by Leningrad artists of 1961, with Piotr Alberti, Evgenia Antipova, Taisia Afonina, Vsevolod Bazhenov, Irina Baldina, Nikolai Baskakov, Leonid Baykov, Yuri Belov, Piotr Belousov, Olga Bogaevskaya, Lev Bogomolets, Nikolai Brandt, Piotr Buchkin, Zlata Bizova, Nikolai Galakhov, Ivan Godlevsky, Elena Gorokhova, Abram Grushko, Oleg Eremeev, Alexei Eriomin, Mikhail Kaneev, Maria Kleschar-Samokhvalova, Mikhail Kozell, Engels Kozlov, Marina Kozlovskaya, Maya Kopitseva, Boris Korneev, Alexander Koroviakov, Elena Kostenko, Anna Kostrova, Gevork Kotiantz, Yaroslav Krestovsky, Valeria Larina, Boris Lavrenko, Ivan Lavsky, Anatoli Levitin, Oleg Lomakin, Dmitry Maevsky, Vladimir Malevsky, Gavriil Malish, Eugene Maltsev, Evsey Moiseenko, Alexei Mozhaev, Nikolai Mukho, Vera Nazina, Mikhail Natarevich, Anatoli Nenartovich, Samuil Nevelshtein, Yuri Neprintsev, Dmitry Oboznenko, Sergei Osipov, Vladimir Ovchinnikov, Lia Ostrova, Filaret Pakun, Genrikh Pavlovsky, Varlen Pen, Boris Petrov, Nikolai Pozdneev, Stepan Privedentsev, Alexander Pushnin, Valentina Rakhina, Semion Rotnitsky, Galina Rumiantseva, Lev Russov, Maria Rudnitskaya, Ivan Savenko, Gleb Savinov, Vladimir Sakson, Alexander Samokhvalov, Vladimir Seleznev, Arseny Semionov, Alexander Semionov, Yuri Shablikin, Boris Shamanov, Alexander Shmidt, Nadezhda Shteinmiller, Elena Skuin, Kim Slavin, Galina Smirnova, Alexander Sokolov, Alexander Stolbov, Victor Teterin, Nikolai Timkov, Leonid Tkachenko, Mikhail Trufanov, Yuri Tulin, Boris Ugarov, Ivan Varichev, Anatoli Vasiliev, Piotr Vasiliev, Valery Vatenin, Lazar Yazgur, German Yegoshin, Vecheslav Zagonek, Sergei Zakharov, Elena Zhukova, Maria Zubreeva, and other important Leningrad artists.
- 1962 (Leningrad): 'The Fall Exhibition of works by Leningrad artists of 1962', with Piotr Alberti, Evgenia Antipova, Taisia Afonina, Irina Baldina, Vsevolod Bazhenov, Olga Bogaevskaya, Nikolai Galakhov, Yuri Belov, Olga Bogaevskaya, Vladimir Gorb, Abram Grushko, Alexei Eremin, Maria Kleschar-Samokhvalova, Boris Korneev, Engels Kozlov, Alexander Koroviakov, Boris Lavrenko, Ivan Lavsky, Valeria Larina, Oleg Lomakin, Gavriil Malish, Evsey Moiseenko, Nikolai Mukho, Piotr Nazarov, Vera Nazina, Mikhail Natarevich, Dmitry Oboznenko, Lev Orekhov, Vladimir Ovchinnikov, Sergei Osipov, Genrikh Pavlovsky, Varlen Pen, Nikolai Pozdneev, Stepan Privedentsev, Galina Rumiantseva, Gleb Savinov, Alexander Semionov, Arseny Semionov, Nadezhda Shteinmiller, Alexander Sokolov, Alexander Stolbov, Alexander Tatarenko, Victor Teterin, Nikolai Timkov, Mikhail Trufanov, Yuri Tulin, Boris Ugarov, Ivan Varichev, Anatoli Vasiliev, Valery Vatenin, Rostislav Vovkushevsky, Vecheslav Zagonek, and other important Leningrad artists.
- 1964 (Leningrad): The Leningrad Fine Arts Exhibition, with Piotr Alberti, Evgenia Antipova, Taisia Afonina, Sergei Babkov, Irina Baldina, Andrei Bantikov, Nikolai Baskakov, Leonid Baykov, Evgenia Baykova, Vsevolod Bazhenov, Yuri Belov, Piotr Belousov, Dmitry Belyaev, Olga Bogaevskaya, Lev Bogomolets, Nikolai Brandt, Dmitry Buchkin, Piotr Buchkin, Zlata Bizova, Lev Chegorovsky, Vladimir Chekalov, Sergei Frolov, Nikolai Galakhov, Ivan Godlevsky, Vasily Golubev, Tatiana Gorb, Abram Grushko, Oleg Eremeev, Alexei Eriomin, Mikhail Kaneev, Yuri Khukhrov, Maria Kleschar-Samokhvalova, Mikhail Kozell, Marina Kozlovskaya, Tatiana Kopnina, Maya Kopitseva, Boris Korneev, Alexander Koroviakov, Elena Kostenko, Nikolai Kostrov, Anna Kostrova, Gevork Kotiantz, Yaroslav Krestovsky, Valeria Larina, Boris Lavrenko, Ivan Lavsky, Anatoli Levitin, Piotr Litvinsky, Oleg Lomakin, Dmitry Maevsky, Gavriil Malish, Eugene Maltsev, Boris Maluev, Yuri Mezhirov, Evsey Moiseenko, Nikolai Mukho, Andrei Mylnikov, Piotr Nazarov, Vera Nazina, Mikhail Natarevich, Anatoli Nenartovich, Yuri Neprintsev, Yaroslav Nikolaev, Dmitry Oboznenko, Victor Oreshnikov, Sergei Osipov, Lia Ostrova, Vyacheslav Ovchinnikov, Vladimir Ovchinnikov, Filaret Pakun, Yuri Pavlov, Genrikh Pavlovsky, Varlen Pen, Nikolai Pozdneev, Stepan Privedentsev, Alexander Pushnin, Semion Rotnitsky, Galina Rumiantseva, Ivan Savenko, Gleb Savinov, Vladimir Sakson, Alexander Samokhvalov, Vladimir Seleznev, Arseny Semionov, Alexander Semionov, Joseph Serebriany, Yuri Shablikin, Boris Shamanov, Alexander Shmidt, Nadezhda Shteinmiller, Elena Skuin, Kim Slavin, Galina Smirnova, Alexander Sokolov, Victor Teterin, Nikolai Timkov, Mikhail Tkachev, Mikhail Trufanov, Yuri Tulin, Vitaly Tulenev, Boris Ugarov, Ivan Varichev, Anatoli Vasiliev, Piotr Vasiliev, Valery Vatenin, Lazar Yazgur, Vecheslav Zagonek, Sergei Zakharov, Ruben Zakharian, Alexander Zaytsev, Elena Zhukova, and other important Leningrad artists.
- 1967 (Moscow): Soviet Russia the Third Republic Exhibition of 1967, with Nikolai Baskakov, Veniamin Borisov, Nikolai Galakhov, Alexei Eriomin, Mikhail Kaneev, Yuri Khukhrov, Engels Kozlov, Marina Kozlovskaya, Maya Kopitseva, Boris Korneev, Nikolai Kostrov, Yaroslav Krestovsky, Boris Lavrenko, Oleg Lomakin, Evsey Moiseenko, Vera Nazina, Samuil Nevelshtein, Yuri Neprintsev, Dmitry Oboznenko, Sergei Osipov, Vladimir Ovchinnikov, Nikolai Pozdneev, Ivan Savenko, Gleb Savinov, Alexander Samokhvalov, Boris Shamanov, Alexander Sokolov, Victor Teterin, Nikolai Timkov, Mikhail Trufanov, Yuri Tulin, Vitaly Tulenev, Ivan Varichev, Igor Veselkin, Vecheslav Zagonek, and other important Leningrad artists.
- 1968 (Leningrad): A Fall Exhibition of works by Leningrad artists of 1968, with Piotr Alberti, Vsevolod Bazhenov, Sergei Frolov, Nikolai Galakhov, Tatiana Gorb, Vladimir Gorb, Mikhail Kaneev, Mikhail Kozell, Engels Kozlov, Elena Kostenko, Nikolai Kostrov, Anna Kostrova, Gevork Kotiantz, Vladimir Krantz, Ivan Lavsky, Dmitry Maevsky, Gavriil Malish, Nikolai Mukho, Mikhail Natarevich, Sergei Osipov, Vladimir Ovchinnikov, Lev Orekhov, Victor Otiev, Maria Rudnitskaya, Ivan Savenko, Vladimir Sakson, Alexander Semionov, Arseny Semionov, Boris Shamanov, Alexander Shmidt, Elena Skuin, Alexander Stolbov, German Tatarinov, Nikolai Timkov, Mikhail Trufanov, Yuri Tulin, Ivan Varichev, Anatoli Vasiliev, Rostislav Vovkushevsky, Lazar Yazgur, Vecheslav Zagonek, Sergei Zakharov, Ruben Zakharian, and other important Leningrad artists.
- 1972 (Leningrad): Our Contemporary The Second Exhibition of works by Leningrad artists of 1972, with Irina Baldina, Nikolai Baskakov, Piotr Belousov, Dmitry Belyaev, Nikolai Galakhov, Irina Getmanskaya, Tatiana Gorb, Irina Dobrekova, Alexei Eriomin, Engels Kozlov, Maya Kopitseva, Boris Korneev, Elena Kostenko, Nikolai Kostrov, Anna Kostrova, Gevork Kotiantz, Boris Lavrenko, Anatoli Levitin, Oleg Lomakin, Dmitry Maevsky, Boris Maluev, Yuri Mezhirov, Vera Nazina, Samuil Nevelshtein, Dmitry Oboznenko, Sergei Osipov, Lia Ostrova, Yuri Pavlov, Genrikh Pavlovsky, Semion Rotnitsky, Kapitolina Rumiantseva, Ivan Savenko, Vladimir Sakson, Arseny Semionov, Alexander Shmidt, Nikolai Timkov, Anatoli Vasiliev, Vecheslav Zagonek, and other important Leningrad artists.
- 1972 (Leningrad): By Native Country Art Exhibition dedicated to 50th Anniversary of USSR, with Evgenia Antipova, Nikolai Baskakov, Olga Bogaevskaya, Nikolai Brandt, Sergei Frolov, Nikolai Galakhov, Vasily Golubev, Tatiana Gorb, Vladimir Gorb, Irina Dobrekova, Mikhail Kaneev, Mikhail Kozell, Marina Kozlovskaya, Engels Kozlov, Maya Kopitseva, Boris Korneev, Elena Kostenko, Nikolai Kostrov, Gevork Kotiantz, Yaroslav Krestovsky, Ivan Lavsky, Oleg Lomakin, Dmitry Maevsky, Gavriil Malish, Evsey Moiseenko, Piotr Nazarov, Samuil Nevelshtein, Dmitry Oboznenko, Sergei Osipov, Filaret Pakun, Genrikh Pavlovsky, Nikolai Pozdneev, Stepan Privedentsev, Ivan Savenko, Gleb Savinov, Vladimir Sakson, Arseny Semionov, Alexander Sokolov, German Tatarinov, Victor Teterin, Nikolai Timkov, Mikhail Trufanov, Yuri Tulin, Vitaly Tulenev, Ivan Varichev, Igor Veselkin, Valery Vatenin, Vecheslav Zagonek, and other important Leningrad artists.
- 1975 (Leningrad): Our Contemporary regional exhibition of Leningrad artists of 1975, with Evgenia Antipova, Taisia Afonina, Vsevolod Bazhenov, Irina Baldina, Nikolai Baskakov, Leonid Baykov, Piotr Belousov, Olga Bogaevskaya, Veniamin Borisov, Zlata Bizova, Nikolai Brandt, Nikolai Galakhov, Vasily Golubev, Elena Gorokhova, Abram Grushko, Irina Dobrekova, Oleg Eremeev, Alexei Eriomin, Mikhail Kaneev, Yuri Khukhrov, Mikhail Kozell, Marina Kozlovskaya, Engels Kozlov, Maya Kopitseva, Boris Korneev, Elena Kostenko, Nikolai Kostrov, Anna Kostrova, Gevork Kotiantz, Vladimir Krantz, Yaroslav Krestovsky, Boris Lavrenko, Anatoli Levitin, Oleg Lomakin, Dmitry Maevsky, Gavriil Malish, Evsey Moiseenko, Piotr Nazarov, Vera Nazina, Mikhail Natarevich, Yuri Neprintsev, Samuil Nevelshtein, Dmitry Oboznenko, Sergei Osipov, Vladimir Ovchinnikov, Genrikh Pavlovsky, Varlen Pen, Nikolai Pozdneev, Stepan Privedentsev, Alexander Pushnin, Galina Rumiantseva, Kapitolina Rumiantseva, Ivan Savenko, Gleb Savinov, Vladimir Sakson, Alexander Samokhvalov, Arseny Semionov, Alexander Semionov, Yuri Shablikin, Boris Shamanov, Alexander Shmidt, Nadezhda Shteinmiller, Elena Skuin, Galina Smirnova, Alexander Stolbov, Victor Teterin, Nikolai Timkov, Leonid Tkachenko, Mikhail Trufanov, Yuri Tulin, Vitaly Tulenev, Ivan Varichev, Anatoli Vasiliev, Igor Veselkin, Valery Vatenin, Lazar Yazgur, German Yegoshin, Vecheslav Zagonek, and other important Leningrad artists.
- 1976 (Moscow): The Fine Arts of Leningrad, with Mikhail Avilov, Evgenia Antipova, Nathan Altman, Irina Baldina, Nikolai Baskakov, Yuri Belov, Piotr Belousov, Dmitry Belyaev, Mikhail Bobyshov, Olga Bogaevskaya, Lev Bogomolets, Nikolai Brandt, Isaak Brodsky, Dmitry Buchkin, Piotr Buchkin, Lev Chegorovsky, Rudolf Frentz, Nikolai Galakhov, Vasily Golubev, Abram Grushko, Oleg Eremeev, Alexei Eriomin, Mikhail Kaneev, Engels Kozlov, Marina Kozlovskaya, Maya Kopitseva, Boris Korneev, Victor Korovin, Elena Kostenko, Nikolai Kostrov, Anna Kostrova, Gevork Kotiantz, Boris Kustodiev, Boris Lavrenko, Oleg Lomakin, Alexander Lubimov, Dmitry Maevsky, Vladimir Malevsky, Gavriil Malish, Boris Maluev, Yuri Mezhirov, Evsey Moiseenko, Andrei Mylnikov, Mikhail Natarevich, Vera Nazina, Yuri Neprintsev, Samuil Nevelshtein, Dmitry Oboznenko, Victor Oreshnikov, Sergei Osipov, Lia Ostrova, Vladimir Ovchinnikov, Alexei Pakhomov, Yuri Pavlov, Genrikh Pavlovsky, Varlen Pen, Kuzma Petrov-Vodkin, Nikolai Pozdneev, Stepan Privedentsev, Alexander Pushnin, Valentina Rakhina, Semion Rotnitsky, Ivan Savenko, Vladimir Sakson, Gleb Savinov, Alexander Samokhvalov, Vladimir Seleznev, Alexander Semionov, Arseny Semionov, Joseph Serebriany, Boris Shamanov, Nadezhda Shteinmiller, Elena Skuin, Galina Smirnova, Alexander Sokolov, Victor Teterin, Nikolai Timkov, Mikhail Trufanov, Yuri Tulin, Boris Ugarov, Ivan Varichev, Anatoli Vasiliev, Valery Vatenin, Nina Veselova, German Yegoshin, Vecheslav Zagonek, Sergei Zakharov, Alexander Zaytsev, Elena Zhukova, and other important Leningrad artists.
- 1978 (Leningrad): 'The Fall Exhibition of works by Leningrad artists of 1978', with Piotr Alberti, Taisia Afonina, Irina Baldina, Nikolai Baskakov, Evgenia Baykova, Vsevolod Bazhenov, Piotr Belousov, Veniamin Borisov, Zlata Bizova, Evgeny Chuprun, Sergei Frolov, Nikolai Galakhov, Vladimir Gorb, Irina Dobrekova, Alexei Eriomin, Mikhail Kaneev, Yuri Khukhrov, Maya Kopitseva, Elena Kostenko, Nikolai Kostrov, Anna Kostrova, Gevork Kotiantz, Mikhail Kozell, Marina Kozlovskaya, Vladimir Krantz, Dmitry Maevsky, Gavriil Malish, Nikolai Mukho, Vera Nazina, Alexander Naumov, Dmitry Oboznenko, Victor Otiev, Evgeny Pozdniakov, Alexander Semionov, Yuri Shablikin, Boris Shamanov, Alexander Stolbov, Alexander Tatarenko, German Tatarinov, Nikolai Timkov, Leonid Tkachenko, Yuri Tulin, Vitaly Tulenev, Ivan Varichev, Anatoli Vasiliev, Ruben Zakharian, and other important Leningrad artists.
- 1994 (Saint Petersburg): Paintings of 1950-1980s by the Leningrad School's artists, with Piotr Alberti, Taisia Afonina, Vsevolod Bazhenov, Piotr Buchkin, Irina Baldina, Veniamin Borisov, Yuri Belov, Piotr Belousov, Vladimir Chekalov, Evgeny Chuprun, Nikolai Galakhov, Irina Dobrekova, Alexei Eriomin, Mikhail Kaneev, Yuri Khukhrov, Mikhail Kozell, Maya Kopitseva, Marina Kozlovskaya, Boris Korneev, Alexander Koroviakov, Elena Kostenko, Piotr Litvinsky, Boris Lavrenko, Dmitry Maevsky, Alexei Mozhaev, Valentina Monakhova, Mikhail Natarevich, Alexander Naumov, Anatoli Nenartovich, Yuri Neprintsev, Samuil Nevelshtein, Dmitry Oboznenko, Lev Orekhov, Sergei Osipov, Vladimir Ovchinnikov, Victor Otiev, Nikolai Pozdneev, Evgeny Pozdniakov, Lev Russov, Galina Rumiantseva, Kapitolina Rumiantseva, Alexander Samokhvalov, Alexander Semionov, Nadezhda Shteinmiller, German Tatarinov, Nikolai Timkov, Mikhail Tkachev, Leonid Tkachenko, Anatoli Vasiliev, Piotr Vasiliev, Rostislav Vovkushevsky, Lazar Yazgur, Vecheslav Zagonek, and other important Leningrad artists.
- 1994 (Saint Petersburg): Etude from the life in creativity of the Leningrad School artists, with Piotr Alberti, Taisia Afonina, Evgenia Antipova, Vsevolod Bazhenov, Irina Baldina, Veniamin Borisov, Zlata Bizova, Vladimir Chekalov, Evgeny Chuprun, Nikolai Galakhov, Tatiana Gorb, Abram Grushko, Irina Dobrekova, Alexei Eriomin, Mikhail Kaneev, Yuri Khukhrov, Mikhail Kozell, Maya Kopitseva, Marina Kozlovskaya, Boris Korneev, Alexander Koroviakov, Elena Kostenko, Piotr Litvinsky, Boris Lavrenko, Ivan Lavsky, Dmitry Maevsky, Alexei Mozhaev, Valentina Monakhova, Nikolai Mukho, Mikhail Natarevich, Alexander Naumov, Anatoli Nenartovich, Dmitry Oboznenko, Lev Orekhov, Sergei Osipov, Vladimir Ovchinnikov, Victor Otiev, Nikolai Pozdneev, Evgeny Pozdniakov, Galina Rumiantseva, Kapitolina Rumiantseva, Lev Russov, Alexander Samokhvalov, Alexander Semionov, Nadezhda Shteinmiller, German Tatarinov, Nikolai Timkov, Mikhail Tkachev, Leonid Tkachenko, Anatoli Vasiliev, Igor Veselkin, Lazar Yazgur, Vecheslav Zagonek, Ruben Zakharian, and other important Leningrad artists.
- 1995 (Saint Petersburg): Lyrical motifs in works of artists of the postwar generation, with Piotr Alberti, Taisia Afonina, Evgenia Antipova, Vsevolod Bazhenov, Irina Baldina, Veniamin Borisov, Yuri Belov, Piotr Belousov, Piotr Buchkin, Vladimir Chekalov, Evgeny Chuprun, Sergei Frolov, Nikolai Galakhov, Abram Grushko, Mikhail Kaneev, Yuri Khukhrov, Mikhail Kozell, Maya Kopitseva, Marina Kozlovskaya, Boris Korneev, Alexander Koroviakov, Elena Kostenko, Ivan Lavsky, Dmitry Maevsky, Gavriil Malish, Nikolai Mukho, Mikhail Natarevich, Anatoli Nenartovich, Yuri Neprintsev, Samuil Nevelshtein, Lev Orekhov, Sergei Osipov, Vladimir Ovchinnikov, Victor Otiev, Nikolai Pozdneev, Evgeny Pozdniakov, Lev Russov, Galina Rumiantseva, Kapitolina Rumiantseva, Alexander Samokhvalov, Alexander Semionov, Alexander Shmidt, Nadezhda Shteinmiller, Alexander Sokolov, Alexander Tatarenko, German Tatarinov, Victor Teterin, Nikolai Timkov, Mikhail Tkachev, Leonid Tkachenko, Anatoli Vasiliev, Piotr Vasiliev, Igor Veselkin, Rostislav Vovkushevsky, Maria Zubreeva, and other important Leningrad artists.
- 1996 (Saint Petersburg): Paintings of 1940-1990s. The Leningrad School, with Piotr Alberti, Taisia Afonina, Vsevolod Bazhenov, Irina Baldina, Veniamin Borisov, Vladimir Chekalov, Evgeny Chuprun, Nikolai Galakhov, Tatiana Gorb, Abram Grushko, Alexei Eriomin, Mikhail Kaneev, Mikhail Kozell, Maya Kopitseva, Marina Kozlovskaya, Alexander Koroviakov, Vladimir Krantz, Boris Lavrenko, Ivan Lavsky, Piotr Litvinsky, Dmitry Maevsky, Valentina Monakhova, Mikhail Natarevich, Anatoli Nenartovich, Samuil Nevelshtein, Lev Orekhov, Sergei Osipov, Vladimir Ovchinnikov, Victor Otiev, Nikolai Pozdneev, Evgeny Pozdniakov, Lev Russov, Galina Rumiantseva, Kapitolina Rumiantseva, Alexander Samokhvalov, Alexander Semionov, Nadezhda Shteinmiller, German Tatarinov, Nikolai Timkov, Mikhail Tkachev, Leonid Tkachenko, Anatoli Vasiliev, Igor Veselkin, Rostislav Vovkushevsky, Ruben Zakharian, and other important Leningrad artists.
- 2013 (Saint Petersburg): Paintings of 1940–1980 by the Artists of the Leningrad School, in ARKA Gallery, with Taisia Afonina, Evgenia Antipova, Vsevolod Bazhenov, Alexei Eriomin, Dmitry Maevsky, Gavriil Malish, Samuil Nevelshtein, Sergei Osipov, Vladimir Ovchinnikov, Lev Russov, Alexander Semionov, Victor Teterin, Nikolai Timkov, Vitaly Tulenev, and other important Leningrad artists.

== Sources ==
- Выставка произведений ленинградских художников 1951 года. Каталог. Л., Лениздат, 1951. С.10.
- Весенняя выставка произведений ленинградских художников 1954 года. Каталог. Л., Изогиз, 1954. С.9.
- Выставка. Живопись, скульптура, графика. Каталог. Л., Государственный Русский музей, 1954.
- Серебряный И. Молодые живописцы // Ленинградский альманах. Кн. 9. Л., Лениздат, 1954. С.338–342.
- Осенняя выставка произведений ленинградских художников. 1956 года. Каталог. Л., Ленинградский художник, 1958. С.9.
- Днепрова Е. Открылась выставка работ ленинградских художников // Вечерний Ленинград, 1956, 6 декабря.
- 1917 – 1957. Выставка произведений ленинградских художников. Каталог. Л., Ленинградский художник, 1958. С.12.
- Всесоюзная художественная выставка, посвященная 40-летию Великой Октябрьской социалистической революции. Каталог. М., Советский художник, 1957. С.19.
- Осенняя выставка произведений ленинградских художников 1958 года. Каталог. Л., Художник РСФСР, 1959. С.9.
- Всесоюзная художественная выставка "40 лет ВЛКСМ". Каталог. М., Министерство культуры СССР, 1958.
- Выставка произведений ленинградских художников 1960 года. Каталог. Л., Художник РСФСР, 1963. С.8.
- Выставка произведений ленинградских художников 1960 года. Каталог. Л., Художник РСФСР, 1961. С.13.
- Республиканская художественная выставка "Советская Россия". Живопись. Скульптура. Графика. Плакат. Монументально-декоративное и театрально-декорационное искусство. Каталог. М., Министерство культуры РСФСР, 1960. С.24.
- Выставка произведений ленинградских художников 1961 года. Каталог. Л., Художник РСФСР, 1964. С.14.
- Осенняя выставка произведений ленинградских художников 1962 года. Каталог. Л., Художник РСФСР, 1962. С.10.
- Ленинград. Зональная выставка. Л., Художник РСФСР, 1965. С.16.
- Кривенко И. "Ленинград" (раздел живописи) // Художник. 1965, № 3. С.27–36.
- Вторая республиканская художественная выставка "Советская Россия". Каталог. М., Советский художник, 1965. С.14.
- Третья Республиканская художественная выставка "Советская Россия". Каталог. М., МК РСФСР, 1967. С.22.
- Осенняя выставка произведений ленинградских художников 1968 года. Каталог. Л., Художник РСФСР, 1971. С.7.
- Выставка произведений ленинградских художников, посвященная 25-летию победы над фашистской Германией. Каталог. Л., Художник РСФСР, 1972. С.6.
- Весенняя выставка произведений ленинградских художников 1969 года. Каталог. Л., Художник РСФСР, 1970. С.9.
- Весенняя выставка произведений ленинградских художников 1971 года. Каталог. Л., Художник РСФСР, 1972. С.8.
- Каталог Осенней выставки произведений ленинградских художников 1971 года. Л., Художник РСФСР, 1973. С.6.
- Наш современник. Вторая выставка произведений ленинградских художников 1972 года. Каталог. Л., Художник РСФСР, 1973. С.6.
- Художники народов СССР. Биобиблиографический словарь. Т.2. М., Искусство, 1972. С.393.
- Каталог произведений художников Российской Федерации, переданных в дар организациям и учреждениям культуры (1963—1971 гг.). М., СХ РСФСР, 1972. С.25.
- Наш современник. Третья выставка произведений ленинградских художников 1973 года. Каталог. Л., Художник РСФСР, 1974. С.7.
- По родной стране. Выставка произведений художников Ленинграда. 50-Летию образования СССР посвящается. Каталог. Л., Художник РСФСР, 1974. С.11.
- Весенняя выставка произведений ленинградских художников. Каталог. Л., Художник РСФСР, 1974. С.6.
- Наш современник. Зональная выставка произведений ленинградских художников 1975 года. Каталог. Л., Художник РСФСР, 1980. С.13.
- Пятая республиканская выставка "Советская Россия". М., Советский художник, 1975. С.10.
- Портрет современника. Пятая выставка произведений ленинградских художников 1976 года. Каталог. Л., Художник РСФСР, 1983. С.8.
- Изобразительное искусство Ленинграда. Каталог выставки. Л., Художник РСФСР, 1976. С.17.
- Выставка произведений ленинградских художников, посвящённая 60-летию Великого Октября. Л., Художник РСФСР, 1982. С.13.
- Осенняя выставка произведений ленинградских художников. 1978 года. Каталог. Л., Художник РСФСР, 1983. С.7.
- Справочник членов Союза художников СССР. Т. 1. М., Советский художник, 1979. С.228.
- Зональная выставка произведений ленинградских художников 1980 года. Каталог. Л., Художник РСФСР, 1983. С.12.
- Леняшин В. Поиски художественной правды // Художник. 1981, № 1. С.8–17.
- Левандовский С. Живопись на Ленинградской зональной // Искусство. 1981, № 2. С.65.
- Выставки советского изобразительного искусства. Справочник. Т. 5. 1954—1958 годы. М., Советский художник, 1981. С.25, 27, 162, 230, 258, 296, 372, 385, 523, 548, 637.
- Шевчук С. Смотреть жизни в лицо. Заметки о живописном разделе выставки ленинградских художников в Манеже // Смена, 1983, 28 декабря.
- Николай Николаевич Галахов. Выставка произведений. Каталог. Л., Художник РСФСР, 1987.
- Справочник членов Ленинградской организации Союза художников РСФСР. Л., Художник РСФСР, 1987. С.28.
- Ленинградские художники. Живопись 1950—1980 годов. Каталог. СПб., 1994. С.3.
- Этюд в творчестве ленинградских художников. Выставка произведений. Каталог. СПб., 1994. С.3.
- Лирика в произведениях художников военного поколения. Выставка произведений. Каталог. СПб., 1995. С.3.
- Живопись 1940—1990 годов. Ленинградская школа. Выставка произведений. СПб., 1996. С.3.
- Связь времен. 1932—1997. Художники – члены Санкт-Петербургского Союза художников России. Каталог выставки. СПб., ЦВЗ "Манеж", 1997. С.285.
- Matthew C. Bown. Dictionary of 20th Century Russian and Soviet Painters 1900-1980s. London, Izomar 1998. ISBN 0-9532061-0-6, ISBN 978-0-9532061-0-0.
- Vern G. Swanson. Soviet Impressionism. Woodbridge, England, Antique Collectors' Club, 2001. Р.21, 122.
- Художники – городу. Выставка к 70-летию Санкт-Петербургского Союза художников. Каталог. СПб., Петрополь, 2003. С.179.
- Sergei V. Ivanov. Unknown Socialist Realism. The Leningrad School. Saint Petersburg, NP-Print Edition, 2007. P.9, 19, 20, 24, 359, 372, 389–407, 445. ISBN 5-901724-21-6, ISBN 978-5-901724-21-7.
- Юбилейный Справочник выпускников Санкт-Петербургского академического института живописи, скульптуры и архитектуры имени И. Е. Репина Российской Академии художеств. 1915—2005. СПб., Первоцвет, 2007. С.69. ISBN 978-5-903677-01-6.
- Галахов Н. Это Родина моя. СПб., Арт-Центр, 2009. С.7, 11. ISBN 978-5-91421-005-9.
- Чегодаева М. Искусство как классовая идеология // Диалог искусств. № 4, 2010. С.39.
- Васильева А. Ода величественной красе русского Севера. Николай Галахов // Современный художник, №2, 2014. С.66–75.
