= Exhibition of Leningrad artists (1951) =

Soviet art exhibition

Exhibition of Leningrad artists. Leningrad, 1951. Catalog
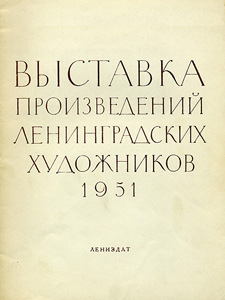
- Year: 1951
- Location: State Russian Museum; Leningrad

Exhibition of Leningrad artists of 1951 (Russian: Выставка произведений ленинградских художников 1951 года) became one of the notable events in Art live of Leningrad of the beginning of 1950s. The exhibition took place in the State Russian Museum.

== History and organization ==
The exhibition was opened on November, 22, and continued up to December, 4, 1951. The organization and preparation of the annual Exhibition of Leningrad artists engaged a specially formed Exhibition Committee which consisted of 26 art-experts. It was published a Catalog of the exhibition. Exhibition displayed works of art of leading Leningraf's painters, sculptors, and graphics artists.

== Contributing artists ==
In the largest Department of Painting were exhibited art works of 126 authors. There were Piotr Alberti, Vladislav Anisovich, Vladimir Avlas, Nikolai Babasuk, Vsevolod Bazhenov, Piotr Belousov, Olga Bogaevskaya, Lev Bogomolets, Piotr Buchkin, Boris Fogel, Rudolf Frentz, Nikolai Galakhov, Ivan Godlevsky, Vladimir Gorb, Tatiana Kopnina, Nikolai Kostrov, Anna Kostrova, Anatoli Levitin, Alexander Lubimov, Vladimir Malagys, Evsey Moiseenko, Andrei Mylnikov, Mikhail Natarevich, Yuri Neprintsev, Yaroslav Nikolaev, Vladimir Ovchinnikov, Sergei Osipov, Filaret Pakun, Genrikh Pavlovsky, Varlen Pen, Stepan Privedentsev, Alexander Pushnin, Ivan Savenko, Gleb Savinov, Alexander Samokhvalov, Vladimir Seleznev, Alexander Shmidt, Nadezhda Shteinmiller, Nikolai Timkov, Leonid Tkachenko, Mikhail Tkachev, Yuri Tulin, Igor Veselkin, Nina Veselova, Rostislav Vovkushevsky, Vecheslav Zagonek, Elena Zhukova, and others most prominent painters of the Leningrad School.

In the Department of Sculptures were exhibited art works of 49 sculptors. Department of graphics presented a creation of 69 artists.

== Contributed artworks ==
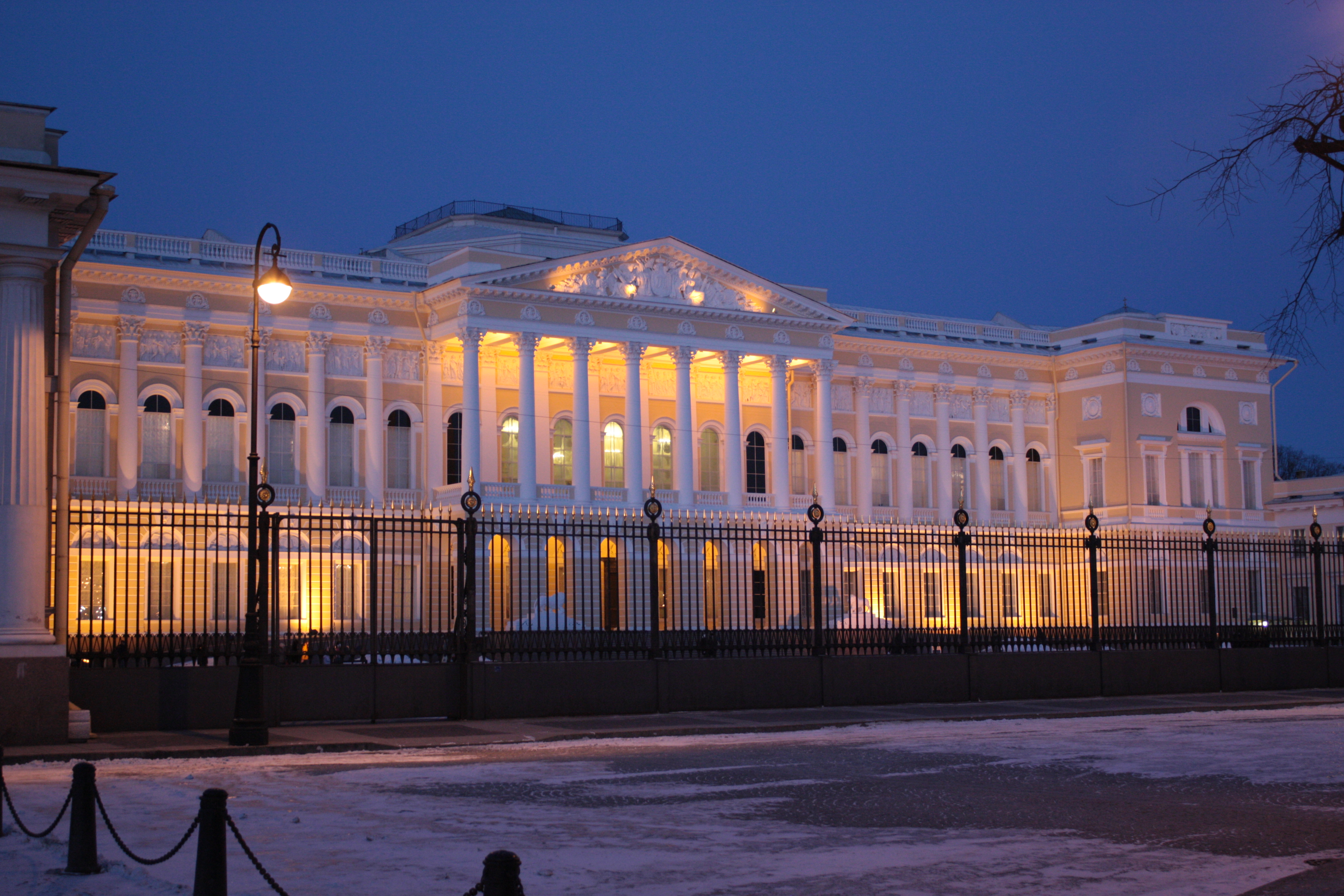
State Russian Museum

For the Exhibition were selected art works created in years of 1950-1951, also some earlier works. All they were exhibited in the first time. Some of them were subsequently found in the collections of leading Soviet Art museums, as well as domestic and foreign galleries and collectors. In exposition were presented all genres of contemporary painting: portrait, historical and genre painting, landscape and cityscape, still life.

Genre painting was presented of "Chess Players" by Piotr Alberti, "A Peaceful sleep" by Olga Bogaevskaya, "Fishing season" by Lev Bogomolets, "Harvest" by Piotr Buchkin, "in Murmansk Sea Port" by Boris Fogel, "Harvester in the field" by Nikolai Kostrov, "A Horse with a foal" by Anna Kostrova, "Horserace" by Evsey Moiseenko, "In Bashkiria" by Andrei Mylnikov, "In the Morning" by Mikhail Natarevich, "On the construction sites of Communism" by Genrikh Pavlovsky, "Agitator among farmers" by Stepan Privedentsev, "Along the shores of the Motherland" by Alexander Samokhvalov, "In Gidroturbinn workshop of the plant named after Stalin" by Nina Veselova, Yuri Tulin, Vecheslav Zagonek, Alexander Pushnin, "Meeting of the Scientific and Technical Council of the "Electrosyla" plant" by Leonid Tkachenko, "Harvesting" by Mikhail Tkachev, and some others.

Historical painting was presented of "Stalin and Voroshilov in the defense of Tsaritsyn" by Nikolai Babasuk, "We'll go the other way" by Piotr Belousov, "Storming of the Winter Palace" by Rudolf Frentz, "October, 20" by Ivan Godlevsky, "Rest after the Battle. Vasily Terkin" by Yuri Neprintsev, "On the tsar's penal servitude" by Yaroslav Nikolaev, "In Gorki" by Vladimir Seleznev, and some others.

Portrait was presented of "Academician Mikhail Kostenko" by Mikhail Anikushin, "Portrait of Strogov" by Vladislav Anisovich, "Pigeon" by Olga Bogaevskaya, "A Collective farm's shepherd" by Piotr Buchkin, "Portrait of Ekaterina Podovinnikova" by Vladimir Gorb, "Schoolgirl" and "Portrait of A. Karnovskaya" by Tatiana Kopnina, "Portrait of F. Lysko" by Anatoli Levitin, "Portrait of artist Piotr Buchkin" and "Portrait of artist Yuri Neprintsev" by Alexander Lubimov, "Alexander Matrosov" by Gleb Savinov, "Man's Portrait" by Igor Veselkin, and some others.

Landscape and Cityscape were presented of "The Beginning of Spring" by Vsevolod Bazhenov, "Here will be the Kuibyshevskaya Hydroelectric Power Station" by Nikolai Galakhov, "Sheaves" by Nikolai Kostrov, "Cloudy day in Bashkiria" by Andrei Mylnikov, "Evening landscape" by Yaroslav Nikolaev, "On the Volga River" by Vladimir Ovchinnikov, "On the Volga River" by Sergei Osipov, "On the Lake" and "Grey Day" by Filaret Pakun, "In Korea" by Varlen Pen, "Soon the harvest" and "Lights of Kolkhoz HPS" by Nikolai Timkov, "The Embankment of Griboedov Canal" by Alexander Shmidt, "Cityscape of the Leningrad" by Nadezhda Shteinmiller, "Evening in Mountains" and "A Winter in Mountains" by Rostislav Vovkushevsky, "Academicheskaya Dacha" by Vecheslav Zagonek, "A Boat" by Elena Zhukova, and some others.

Still life paintings were presented of "Flowers" and "Still life" by Gleb Savinov, "Still life" by Anna Kostina, and some others.

== Acknowledgment ==
Exhibition was widely covered in press and in literature on Soviet fine art.

== See also ==
- Fine Art of Leningrad
- Leningrad School of Painting
- 1951 in fine arts of the Soviet Union
- Saint Petersburg Union of Artists
- Socialist realism

== Sources ==
- Выставка произведений ленинградских художников 1951 года. Каталог. Л., Лениздат, 1951.
- Выставки советского изобразительного искусства. Справочник. Т.4. 1948—1953 годы. М., Советский художник, 1976. C.353-354.
- Справочник членов Ленинградской организации Союза художников РСФСР. Л., Художник РСФСР, 1980.
- Художники народов СССР. Биографический словарь. Т.1-4. М., Искусство, 1970-1995.
- Справочник членов Союза художников СССР. Том 1,2. М., Советский художник, 1979.
- Sergei V. Ivanov. Unknown Socialist Realism. The Leningrad School. Saint Petersburg: NP-Print Edition, 2007. P.389, 413. ISBN 5-901724-21-6, ISBN 978-5-901724-21-7
- Юбилейный Справочник выпускников Санкт-Петербургского академического института живописи, скульптуры и архитектуры имени И. Е. Репина Российской Академии художеств. 1915—2005. Санкт-Петербург, «Первоцвет», 2007.
- Галахов Н. Это Родина моя. СПб., Арт-Центр, 2009. С.14-15. ISBN 978-5-91421-005-9.
