= Spring exhibition (Leningrad, 1954) =

Soviet art exhibition

Spring Fine Art Exhibition. Leningrad, 1954. Catalog
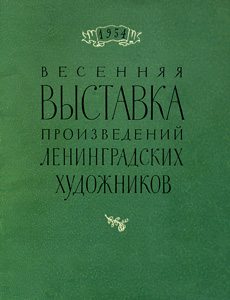
- Year: 1956
- Location: Leningrad Union of Soviet Artists Exhibition Halls; Leningrad

Spring Fine Art Exhibition of Leningrad artists (Leningrad, 1954) (Russian: Весенняя выставка произведений ленинградских художников 1954 года) became one of the largest Soviet art exhibitions of 1954 and one of the first art exhibitions after Joseph Stalin's death. The exhibition took place in Leningrad Union of Soviet Artists Exhibition Halls on Bolshaya Morskaya st. 38.

== History and Organization ==
The Spring Fine Art Exhibition of 1954 was opened on 23 May. Organization and preparation of the exhibition was handled by a specially formed Exhibition Committee which consisted of 34 art-experts headed by Joseph Serebriany. It published a Catalog of the exhibition. In total, the exhibition displayed almost 500 works of art of 196 of the best painters, sculptors, and graphics of Leningrad.

== Contributing Artists ==
In the largest Department of Painting were exhibited art works of 93 authors. There were Evgenia Antipova, Ivan Andreev, Nikolai Baskakov, Leonid Baykov, Dmitry Belyaev, Dmitry Buchkin, Leonid Baykov, Piotr Fomin, Sergei Frolov, Nikolai Galakhov, Vladimir Gorb, Leonid Kabachek, Boris Kharchenko, Maya Kopitseva, Boris Korneev, Elena Kostenko, Anna Kostrova, Gevork Kotiantz, Valeria Larina, Boris Lavrenko, Ivan Lavsky, Gavriil Malish, Alexei Mozhaev, Nikolai Mukho, Yuri Neprintsev, Samuil Nevelshtein, Sergei Osipov, Vladimir Ovchinnikov, Igor Razdrogin, Lev Russov, Ivan Savenko, Vladimir Seleznev, Arseny Semionov, Vladimir Serov, Alexander Shmidt, Elena Skuin, Victor Teterin, Nikolai Timkov, Mikhail Tkachev, Leonid Tkachenko, Boris Ugarov, Vitaly Valtsev, Gleb Verner, Vecheslav Zagonek, Elena Zhukova, and others most prominent painters of the Leningrad School.

In the Department of Sculptures were exhibited art works of 46 sculptors. Department of graphics presented a creation of 54 artists.

== Contributed Artworks ==
For the Exhibition were selected art works created in 1953-1954, also some earlier works. All they were exhibited in the first time. Some of them were subsequently found in the collections of Soviet Art museums, as well as domestic and foreign galleries and collectors.

Genre painting was presented of "Practical exercises" by Evgenia Antipova, "On the floating fish factory" by Nikolai Baskakov, "Girlfriend" by Dmitry Belyaev, "Young Figure Skaters" by Dmitry Buchkin, "Pier on the Volga River" by Nikolai Galakhov, "Parting" by Boris Lavrenko, "Our took!" by Yuri Neprintsev, "Skier girl" by Samuil Nevelshtein, "Firstborn" by Vladimir Ovchinnikov, "On the forest plot" by Igor Razdrogin, "The Winter Palace is taken!" by Vladimir Serov, "On the collective farm plantation" by Mikhail Tkachev, "On the Karelian lakes", "The barnyard" by Leonid Tkachenko, "A Meeting", "On the bridge", "Redhead horse" by Boris Ugarov, "Stalin among fishermen of Yenisei River" by Vitaly Valtsev, and some others.

Portrait was presented of "Portrait of Zvontsova, a teacher of the Leningrad Secondary Art School" by Ivan Andreev, "Portrait of Markov, deputy chairman of the collective farm "Leninsky Put", "Portrait of a vegetable grower Kapelina", "Portrait of the best milker Kuznetsova", "Portrait of sheepman Wilson", "Portrait of stableman Andreev" by Boris Kharchenko, "Portrait of artist Marina Kozlovskaya" by Boris Korneev, "Portrait of Academician Sergei Vavilov", "Portrait of Ira Zykova", "Portrait of graduate student Kostenko", "Portrait of student Krzhyzhanovskaya" by Elena Kostenko, "Portrait of artist Alexander Zaytsev", "Portrait of actress Bokkadorova" by Valeria Larina, "Sleeping girl" by Alexei Mozhaev, "Lena", "Valentina" by Samuil Nevelshtein, "Girl with a doll" by Igor Razdrogin, "A Girl with a bow" by Lev Russov, "Man's portrait" by Victor Teterin, "Portrait of Yurgenson, a collective farm watchman", "Tractor driver Andreev" by Leonid Tkachenko, "Portrait of Kolomiytseva" by Gleb Verner, and some others.

Landscape and Cityscape were presented of "Landing place", "Kizhi Pogost", "On the Onega Lake" by Leonid Baykov, "Grey day", "Snow came down" by Piotr Fomin, "Evening. Kama Mouth", "Pier on the Volga River", "Little courtyard" by Nikolai Galakhov, "Alupka", "The Theatre named of the Lenin Komsomol in Leningrad" by Leonid Kabachek, "November" and "Cloudy Day", "Birche-trees" by Maya Kopitseva, "Altai, Lake of Teletskoye" by Boris Korneev, "Autumn Day", "Alley in park of the Victory", "Cold Spring" by Ivan Lavsky, "A Field" by Gavriil Malish, "Coast of Southern Sakhalin" by Nikolai Mukho, "Of the early spring" by Samuil Nevelshtein, "Last Snow" by Sergei Osipov, "September", "Syverskaya settlement", "Ural Mountains", "A Young Aspen", "Hay was harvested" by Ivan Savenko, "Early Spring" by Vladimir Seleznev, "Etude" by Arseny Semionov, "Last ice", "Terrace on the sea" by Alexander Shmidt, "Gurzuf. Landscape" and "The Restoration of the Mikhailovsky Castle", "Sredniy Prospekt on Vasilyevsky Island in Leningrad" by Victor Teterin, "Evening on the Don River", "Landscape", "Don River expanses", "Evening", "On the Don River" by Nikolai Timkov, "Landscape", "Horses", "Spring waters" by Boris Ugarov, "First Snow" and "Birds fly away" by Vecheslav Zagonek, "Spring day on the Sea" by Elena Zhukova, and some others.

Still life paintings were presented by art works of Vladimir Gorb, Gevork Kotiantz, Elena Skuin, and some others.

== Acknowledgment ==
The Spring Exhibition of the Leningrad artists of 1954 was widely covered in press and in literature on Soviet fine art.

== See also ==
- Fine Art of Leningrad
- Leningrad School of Painting
- 1956 in fine arts of the Soviet Union* Leningrad School of Painting
- Saint Petersburg Union of Artists
- Socialist realism

== Sources ==
- Весенняя выставка произведений ленинградских художников. 1954 год. Каталог. Л., ЛОСХ, 1954.
- Коровкевич C. Ярче и глубже показывать новое, передовое. Заметки о весенней выставке работ ленинградских художников // Вечерний Ленинград, 1954, 12 июня.
- Выставки советского изобразительного искусства. Справочник. Т.5. 1954—1958 гг. М., Советский художник, 1981. С.25-26.
- Справочник членов Ленинградской организации Союза художников РСФСР. Л., Художник РСФСР, 1980.
- Художники народов СССР. Биобиблиографический словарь. Т.1-4. М., Искусство, 1970-1995.
- Справочник членов Союза художников СССР. Т.1,2. М., Советский художник, 1979.
- Sergei V. Ivanov. Unknown Socialist Realism. The Leningrad School. Saint Petersburg, NP-Print Edition, 2007. P.389. ISBN 5-901724-21-6, ISBN 978-5-901724-21-7
- Юбилейный Справочник выпускников Санкт-Петербургского академического института живописи, скульптуры и архитектуры имени И. Е. Репина Российской Академии художеств. 1915—2005. СПб., Первоцвет, 2007.
