= Soviet Russia (Exhibition, 1975) =

1975 Soviet art exhibition

Fifth Republican Art Exhibition "Soviet Russia". Catalog
- Year: 1975
- Location: Manezh Exhibition Hall; Moscow

Fifth Republican Art Exhibition "Soviet Russia" (Moscow, 1975) (Russian: Пятая Республиканская художественная выставка "Советская Россия" 1975 года) become a main national art event of 1975, as well as one of the largest Soviet art exhibitions of the mid-1970s. Exhibition took place in Manezh Exhibition Hall.

== History and organization ==
Exhibition has been opened in November 1975 in Moscow Manege. Organization and preparation of the Fifth Republican Art Exhibition "Soviet Russia" engaged specially formed Exhibition Committee in the amount of 84 most authoritative experts in the field of fine arts under head of Gely Korzhev. It was published Catalog of the exhibition. In total, the Exhibition displayed over 1,800 works of art of painters, sculptors, graphics, masters of arts and crafts, artists of theater and cinema. Many of art works have been purchased for the largest Soviet Art museums, including the Russian Museum, the Tretyakov Gallery, and others. After the Exhibition in Moscow there were organized traveling exhibitions, which have been shown in major cities of the Russian Federation.

== Contributing artists ==
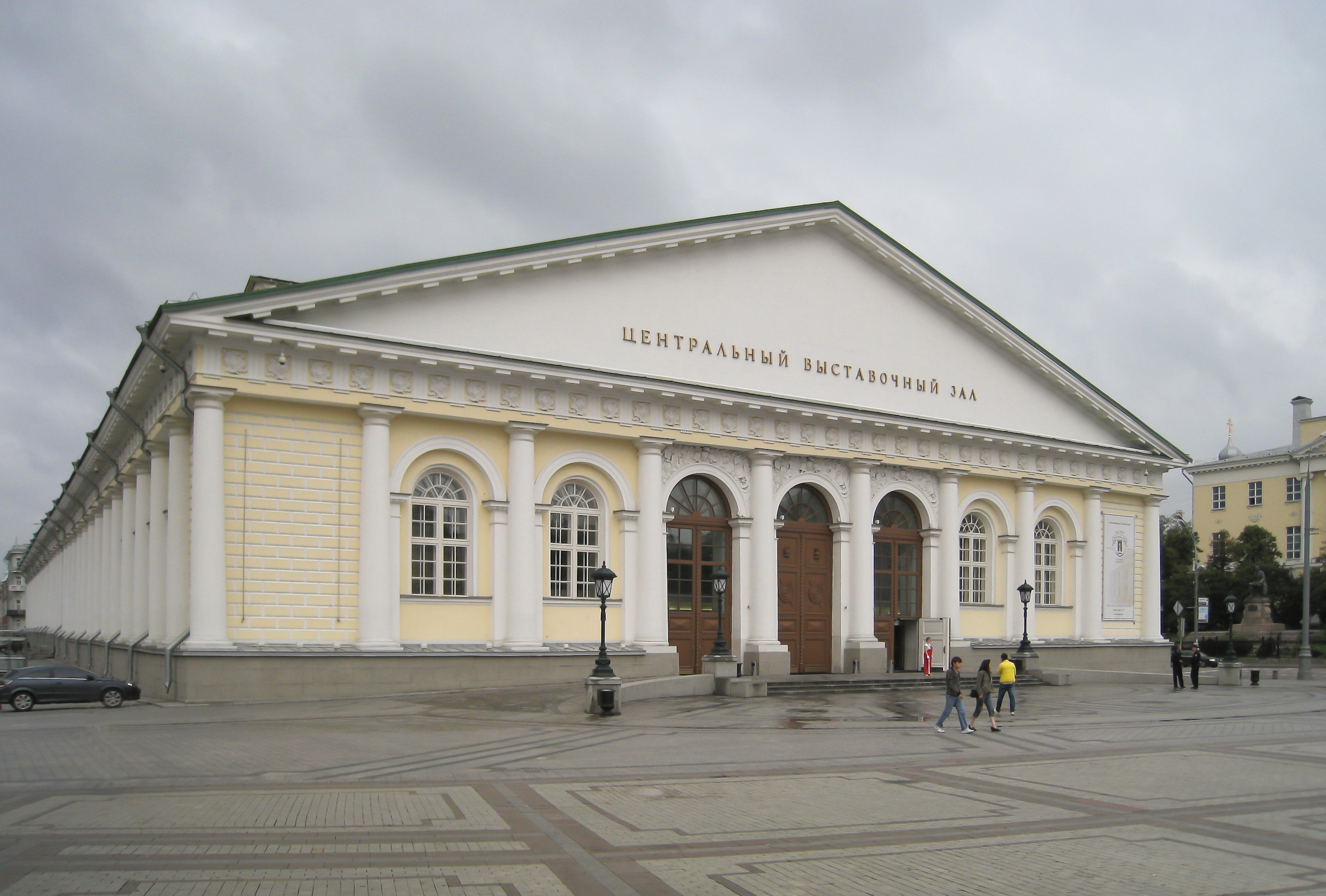
Moscow Manezh Exhibition Hall. 2008

In the largest Department of Painting were exhibited over 950 art works by over 750 important painters. There were Irina Baldina, Dmitry Belyaev, Olga Bogaevskaya, Nikolai Brandt, Nikolai Galakhov, Aleksei Gritsai, Alexei Eriomin, Mikhail Kaneev, Gely Korzhev, Engels Kozlov, Maya Kopitseva, Boris Korneev, Nikolai Kostrov, Yaroslav Krestovsky, Anatoli Levitin, Oleg Lomakin, Yuri Mezhirov, Evsey Moiseenko, Andrei Mylnikov, Yuri Neprintsev, Yaroslav Nikolaev, Dmitry Oboznenko, Lia Ostrova, Semion Rotnitsky, Ivan Savenko, Gleb Savinov, Kim Slavin, Boris Shamanov, Nikolai Timkov, Mikhail Trufanov, Yuri Tulin, Boris Ugarov, Ivan Varichev, Vecheslav Zagonek, Alexander Zaytsev, and many others most prominent painters of the Russian Federation. Over 2000 art works were exhibited.

In the Department of Sculptures were exhibited 350 art works by over 240 authors including Mikhail Anikushin, Lev Kerbel, Alexander Kibalnikov, Sergei Konenkov, Nikolai Tomsky, Yevgeny Vuchetich, and many others most prominent sculptors of the Russian Federation.

In the Department of Graphic were exhibited 840 art works by over 530 most prominent graphic artists of the Russian Federation.

== Contributed artworks ==
For display at the Exhibition were selected art works created in 1973-1975, as well as some earlier works. Many of them were previously shown at the city and regional Art Exhibitions and were subsequently found in the collections of Soviet Art museums, as well as domestic and foreign galleries and collectors.

Genre and historical painting was presented of "A Youth" by Irina Baldina, "Fathers and Sons", "In native House" by Alexei Eriomin, "A Holiday in the village of Pochinok" by Kirill Ivanov, "Return" by Boris Korneev, "She is doomed" by Gely Korzhev, "Oilers of Pechora", "Works begin" by Engels Kozlov, "Assemblers" by Yaroslav Krestovsky, "Dawn" by Anatoli Levitin, "May 9", "Boys", "They are called by Youth", "A Speech" by Evsey Moiseenko, "Farewell" by Andrei Mylnikov, "Died a heroic death" by Dmitry Oboznenko, "A Memory" by Lia Ostrova, "Paths - the roads" by Vsevolod Petrov-Maslakov, "September on Mezen River" by Victor Popkov, "Victory Day" by Gleb Savinov, "Liberation" by Fyodor Savostianov, "Swing" by Boris Shamanov, "In the name of Freedom!" by Yuri Tulin, "June of 1941" by Boris Ugarov, "On the fields close to Ladoga Lake" by Vecheslav Zagonek, and some others.

Portrait was presented of "Portrait of Nikolai Urvantsev" by Dmitry Belyaev, "Fedia" by Olga Bogaevskaya, "Portrait of artist Alexander Zaytsev" by Mikhail Deviatov, "In Cafe Greko" by Victor Ivanov, "Selfportrait" by Larisa Kirillova, "Portrait of ballerina Kolpakova", "Portrait of notable builder Lesnyakov", "Portrait of Rogoza, brigadier of electro assemblers" by Anatoli Levitin, "Portrait of tractor-driver Matvienko" by Oleg Lomakin, "Verochka" by Andrei Mylnikov, "Portrait of Gordievsky" by Yuri Neprintsev, "Miner Ruzin" by Semion Rotnitsky, "Portrait of Larisa Romanova" by Gleb Savinov, "Portrait of artist Kim Britov" by Vladimir Tokarev, "Portrait of Maria Ugarova" by Boris Ugarov, and some others.

Landscape, Seascape and Cityscape were presented of "A Rowan-tree" by Nikolai Brandt, "April day", "Early May", "A Midday", "Flax" by Piotr Fomin, "White night in Karelia", "On the White Sea" by Nikolai Galakhov, "October evening", "A Spring. Moonlight night", "In the old park" by Aleksei Gritsai, "Kirovsky bridge in Leningrad" by Mikhail Kaneev, "Kola River make noise", "A Village" by Boris Korneev, "A Garden" by Evsey Moiseenko, "Thunderstorm", "Light day" by Andrei Mylnikov, "A White Night" by Yaroslav Nikolaev, "Tent of geologists" by Ivan Savenko, "A Midsummer" by Kim Slavin, "Griboyedov Canal" by Igor Suvorov, "February" by Nikolai Timkov, "Northern lake" by Mikhail Trufanov, "Spring water", "A May" by Boris Ugarov, "A Spring has come", "A Village" by Ivan Varichev, "Chernavino village. A Fall time", "Frosty Morning", "Willow close to the brook" by Vecheslav Zagonek, "A Twilight" by Alexander Zaytsev, and some others.

Still life paintings were presented of "Still life with Mushrooms", "A Milk" by Fania Kaplan, "Fruits", "Still Life with Duck" by Mikhail Konchalovsky, "Still life with Samovar" by Alexander Konyashin, "Bouquet", "Wildflowers" by Kira Korzheva, "Cornflowers" by Ivan Savenko, "Cornflowers and green rye" by Boris Shamanov, "Autumn Still Life" by Vasily Sokolov, "Root Beer. Still life" by Vladimir Stozharov, and some others.

== Acknowledgment ==
Fifth Republican Art Exhibition "Soviet Russia" were widely covered in the press and literature on Soviet fine art.

== See also ==
- Soviet art
- Fine Art of Leningrad
- 1975 in fine arts of the Soviet Union
- Leningrad School of Painting
- Saint Petersburg Union of Artists
- Socialist realism

== Sources ==
- Пятая республиканская выставка «Советская Россия». Каталог. М., Советский художник, 1975.
- Пятая республиканская художественная выставка «Советская Россия». Л., Художник РСФСР, 1977.
- Справочник членов Ленинградской организации Союза художников РСФСР. Л., Художник РСФСР, 1980.
- Художники народов СССР. Биобиблиографический словарь. Т.1-4. М., Искусство, 1970-1995.
- Справочник членов Союза художников СССР. Том 1,2. М., Советский художник, 1979.
- А. Каганович. Андрей Андреевич Мыльников. Л., Художник РСФСР, 1980, 86-87.
- Леняшин В. А. Художников друг и советник. Современная живопись и проблемы критики. Л., Художник РСФСР, 1985. С.60.
- Дмитренко А. Зональные (региональные) и республиканские выставки в художественной жизни России 1960-1980-х годов // Время перемен. Искусство 1960—1985 в Советском Союзе. СПб., Государственный Русский музей, 2006. С.31-33. ISBN 5-93332-199-0.
- Time for Change. The Art of 1960-1985 in the Soviet Union. Saint Petersburg, State Russian Museum, 2006. P.376.
- Sergei V. Ivanov. Unknown Socialist Realism. The Leningrad School. Saint Petersburg: NP-Print Edition, 2007. P.398-399, 419. ISBN 5-901724-21-6, ISBN 978-5-901724-21-7
- Юбилейный Справочник выпускников Санкт-Петербургского академического института живописи, скульптуры и архитектуры имени И. Е. Репина Российской Академии художеств. 1915—2005. СПб., «Первоцвет», 2007.
