= Our Contemporary (Exhibition, 1972) =

1972 Soviet art exhibition

Our Contemporary. The Second Exhibition of Leningrad artists of 1972. Catalog
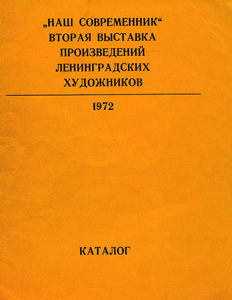
- Year: 1972
- Location: State Russian Museum; Leningrad

"Our Contemporary" The Second Exhibition of Leningrad artists of 1972 (Russian: Наш современник. Вторая выставка произведений ленинградских художников 1972 года) became one of the notable events in Art of the USSR of 1972. The exhibition took place in the State Russian Museum. Exhibition continued a series of art exhibitions of the 1970s, dedicated to image of our contemporary and opened one year before.

== History and Organization ==
The exhibition was opened in the autumn of 1972. The organization and preparation of exhibition engaged a specially formed Exhibition Committee which consisted of 26 authoritative art-experts. It published a Catalog of the exhibition. The exhibition displayed works of art of leading Leningrad painters, sculptors, and graphics artists.

== Contributing Artists ==
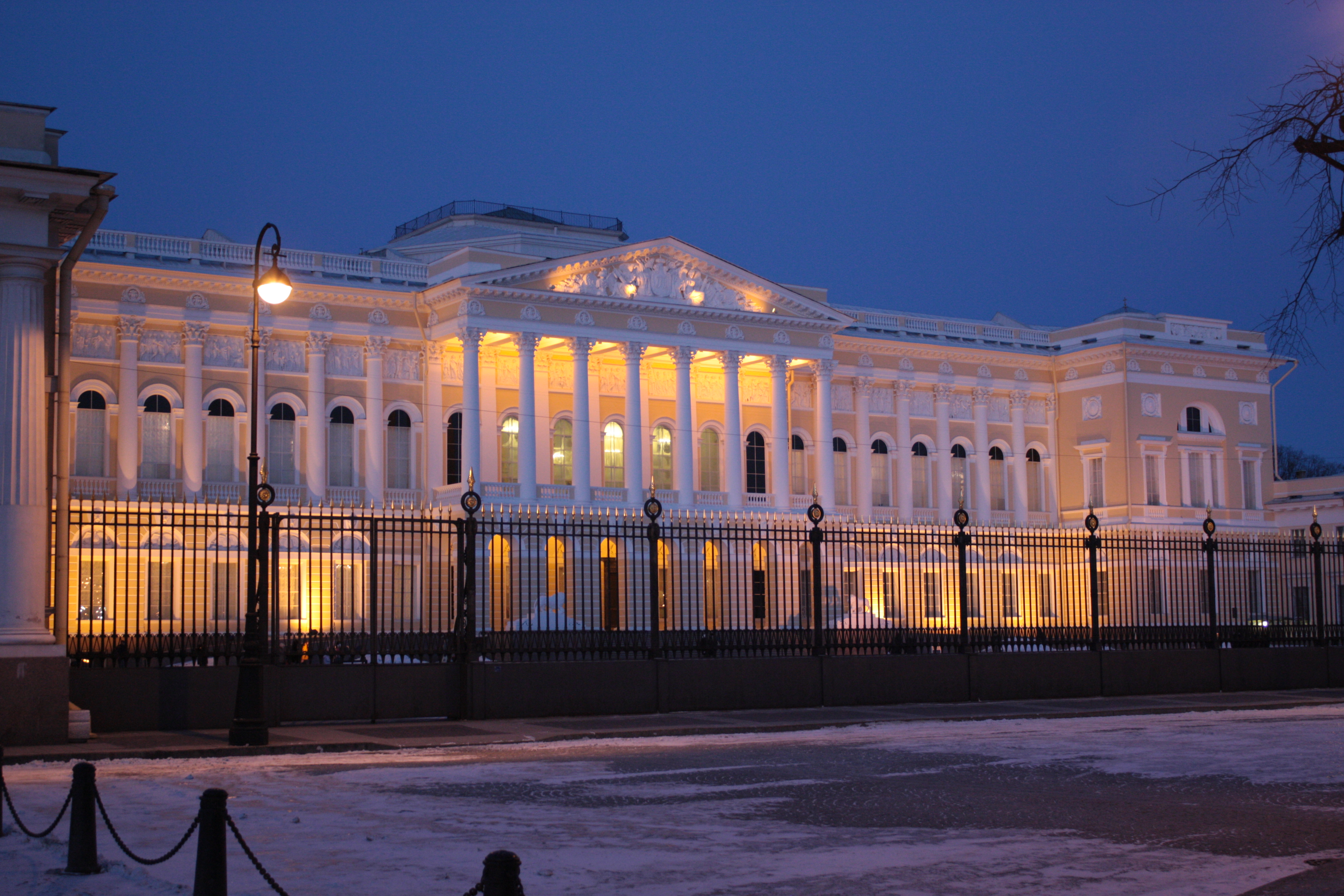
State Russian Museum

In the largest Department of Painting were exhibited art works of 120 authors. There were Irina Baldina, Nikolai Baskakov, Piotr Belousov, Dmitry Belyaev, Nikolai Galakhov, Irina Getmanskaya, Tatiana Gorb, Irina Dobrekova, Alexei Eriomin, Maya Kopitseva, Boris F. Borzin, Boris Korneev, Elena Kostenko, Nikolai Kostrov, Anna Kostrova, Gevork Kotiantz, Engels Kozlov, Boris Lavrenko, Anatoli Levitin, Oleg Lomakin, Dmitry Maevsky, Eugene Maltsev, Boris Maluev, Yuri Mezhirov, Vera Nazina, Samuil Nevelshtein, Dmitry Oboznenko, Sergei Osipov, Lia Ostrova, Yuri Pavlov, Genrikh Pavlovsky, Varlen Pen, Semion Rotnitsky, Kapitolina Rumiantseva, Ivan Savenko, Vladimir Sakson, Arseny Semionov, Alexander Shmidt, Nikolai Timkov, Anatoli Vasiliev, Vecheslav Zagonek, Elena Zhukova, and others most prominent painters of the Leningrad School.

In the Department of Sculptures were exhibited art works of 72 sculptors. Department of graphics presented a creation of 58 artists.

== Contributed Artworks ==
For the Exhibition were selected art works created in years of 1971-1972, also some earlier works. All they were exhibited in the first time. Some of them were subsequently found in the collections of leading Soviet Art museums, as well as domestic and foreign galleries and collectors.

Portrait of workers of Science and Culture was presented of "Portrait of General Remizov" by Piotr Belousov, "Portrait of architect Staritsyna" by Tatiana Gorb, "Self-Portrait" by Irina Dobrekova, "Portrait od artist Mikhail Platunov" by Elena Kostenko, "Portrait of Malyshev, a prominent scientist" by Engels Kozlov, "Portrait of an art critic Vasylieva" by Anatoli Levitin, "From mowing (writer Fyodor Abramov at the Motherland)" by Eugene Maltsev, "Portrait of actor Donatas Banionis" by Yuri Mezhirov, "Portrait of artist Leonid Ptitsyn" by Yuri Pavlov, "Portrait of artist Yuri Neprintsev" by Alexander Romanychev, "Portrait of Speransky, Honored Artist of the Russian Federation", "Portrait of Zalkaln, sculptor", "Portrait of student" by Semion Rotnitsky, "Portrait of an art critic Leonova" by Vladimir Sakson, and some others.

Portrait of a working man was presented of "Portrait of Anna Lukina, collective farmer" by Irina Baldina, "Portrait of Vasiliev, old bolshevik" by Nikolai Baskakov, "Siberian hunter Belonogov", "Portrait of the milkmaid" by Dmitry Belyaev, "Motorman Eugene Zaitsev" by Alexei Eriomin, "Portrait of Nikolai Efimov, veteran of Great Patriotic war" by Boris Korneev, "Portrait of a collective farm mechanic Vasilyev" by Nikolai Kostrov, "Portrait of a Teacher" by Gevork Kotiantz, "Portrait of kolkhoz groom" by Oleg Lomakin, "Baltic sailor Zverev" by Boris Maluev, "Ilyina, one of the first collective farmers on Oyat" by Vera Nazina, "Steelworker Sevastianov" by Genrikh Pavlovsky, "Nina Brashkina, famous milkmaid" by Varlen Pen, "Portrait of aunt Masha" by Vladimir Sakson, "Chukchi reindeer herders" by Anrei Yakovlev, "Anatoli Spytsin, electrical engineer" by Elena Zhukova, and some others.

Female and Child portrait was presented of "Portrait of Mother" by Mikhail Anikushin, "Grandmother with grandchildren" by Nikolai Baskakov, "Student" by Irina Getmanskaya, "Tania", "On the school holidays" by Boris Korneev, "Vera" by Boris Lavrenko, "Mother of a soldier" by Dmitry Maevsky, "Elena" by Vera Nazina, "Nikolai", "Lucy" by Samuil Nevelshtein, "Young Khmer girl" by Dmitry Oboznenko, "Portrait of student-girl" by Lia Ostrova, "A Sleep" by Kapitolina Rumiantseva, "Female portrait" by Vladimir Sakson, "Girl in Studio" by Alexander Shmidt, "Portrait of Galina Sazikina" by Anatoli Vasiliev, and some others.

Were exhibited also some landscapes and still life paintings. Among them "On the Moyka river" by Nikolai Galakhov, "Still life with Jug", "Branch of Apple-tree" by Maya Kopitseva, "Still Life with Grapes" by Gevork Kotiantz, "Haystacks", "Gypsum plant", "Cactus" by Sergei Osipov, "On the northern Urals" by Ivan Savenko, "Still life with Cactus", "Gypsum plant", "Still life with fruits" by Arseny Semionov, "Winter", "Small Nevka River" by Nikolai Timkov, "Rainy time over Yenisey", "Port on the Yenisei River", "At the berth port of Dudinka", "Yenisei motive" by Vecheslav Zagonek, "Gavan new district is being built" by Elena Zhukova, and some others.

== Acknowledgment ==
Exhibition was widely covered in press and in literature on Soviet fine art.

== See also ==
- Fine Art of Leningrad
- Leningrad School of Painting
- 1972 in fine arts of the Soviet Union
- Saint Petersburg Union of Artists
- Socialist realism

== Sources ==
- Наш современник. Вторая выставка произведений ленинградских художников. Живопись. Графика. Скульптура. 1972 год. Каталог. Л., Художник РСФСР, 1973.
- Справочник членов Ленинградской организации Союза художников РСФСР. Л., Художник РСФСР, 1980.
- Художники народов СССР. Биографический словарь. Т.1-4. М., Искусство, 1970–1995.
- Справочник членов Союза художников СССР. Том 1,2. М., Советский художник, 1979.
- Время перемен. Искусство 1960—1985 в Советском Союзе. СПб., Государственный Русский музей, 2006.
- Sergei V. Ivanov. Unknown Socialist Realism. The Leningrad School. Saint Petersburg: NP-Print Edition, 2007. P.388. ISBN 5-901724-21-6, ISBN 978-5-901724-21-7
- Юбилейный Справочник выпускников Санкт-Петербургского академического института живописи, скульптуры и архитектуры имени И. Е. Репина Российской Академии художеств. 1915–2005. Санкт-Петербург, «Первоцвет», 2007.
