= Spring exhibition =

Spring exhibition may refer to the following Soviet fine art displays:

- Spring exhibition (Leningrad, 1954)
- Spring exhibition (Leningrad, 1955)
- Spring exhibition (Leningrad, 1965)
- Spring exhibition (Leningrad, 1969)

== See also ==
- Charlottenborg Spring Exhibition, an annual art event in Copenhagen, Denmark
- Summer Exhibition of the Royal Academy in London, historically held in Spring
