= Spring exhibition (Leningrad, 1969) =

1969 Soviet art exhibition

Spring Exhibition of Leningrad artists of 1969. Catalog
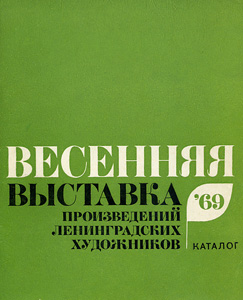
- Year: 1969
- Location: Leningrad Union of Soviet Artists Exhibition Halls; Leningrad

Spring Exhibition of Leningrad artists of 1969 (Russian: "Весенняя выставка произведений ленинградских художников 1969 года") opened in the Exhibition Halls of the Leningrad Union of Soviet Artists to become one of notable Art Exhibition of 1969 in the Soviet Union.

== History and Organization ==
For the organization and preparation of Exhibition was formed Exhibition Committee in consist of authoritative art-experts. Exhibition Catalog was published. At whole Exhibition attended over 170 artists of the Leningrad.

== Contributing Artists ==
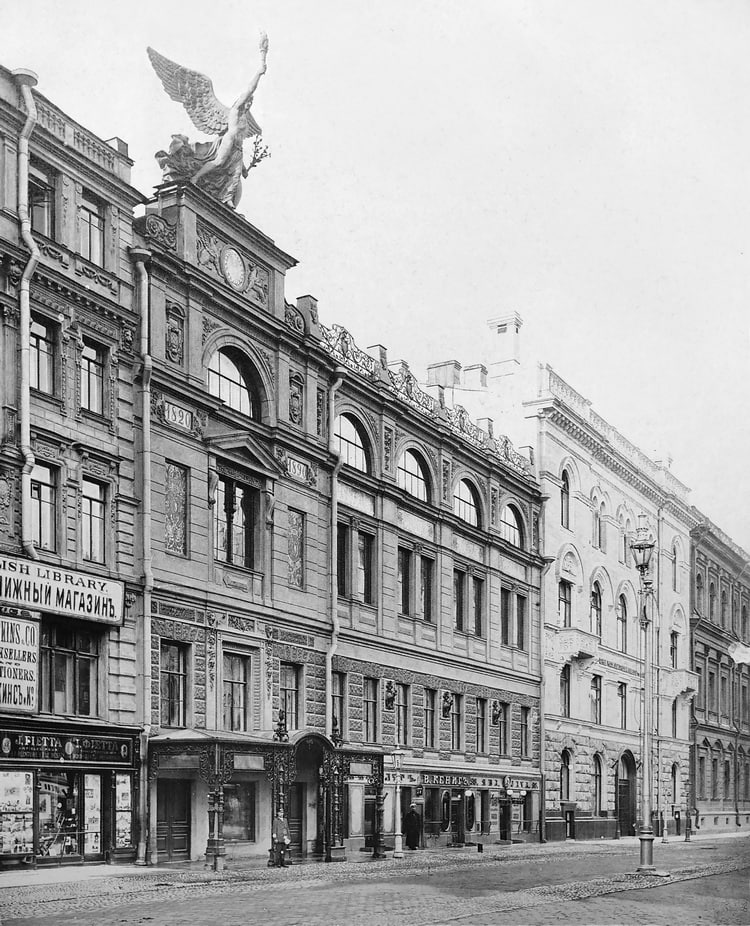
Building of the Leningrad Union of Soviet Artists on the Bolshaya Morskaya st. (formerly, the Imperial Society for the Encouragement of the Arts (1912)

In the largest Department of Painting were exhibited art works of 82 authors. There were Vladimir Andreev, Evgenia Antipova, Zaven Arshakuni, Nikolai Baskakov, Vsevolod Bazhenov, Dzovinar Becarian, Yacov Besperstov, Veniamin Borisov, Lidia Davidenkova, Irina Dobrekova, German Egoshin, Leonid Fokin, Piotr Fomin, Vladimir Frentz, Nikolai Furmankov, Oleg Gadalov, Nikolai Galakhov, Yakov Golubev, Mikhail Grachov, Elena Ivanova-Eberling, Andrei Kochetkov, Maya Kopitseva, Victor Korovin, Boris Kotick, Mikhail Kozell, Vladimir Krantz, Sergei Lastochkin, Boris Lavrenko, Ivan Lavsky, Valery Lednev, Vera Lubimova, Dmitry Maevsky, Boris Maluev, Vladimir Maximikhin, Lidia Milova, Alexander Naumov, Yaroslav Nikolaev, Vasily Oreshkin, Victor Otiev, Yuri Pavlov, Genrikh Pavlovsky, Varlen Pen, Vsevolod Petrov-Maslakov, Valentin Pechatin, Tamara Polosatova, Ivan Savenko, Vladimir Sakson, Alexander Semionov, Yuri Shablikin, Boris Shamanov, Alexander Shmidt, Igor Skorobogatov, Elena Skuin, Kim Slavin, Nina Suzdaleva, German Tatarinov, Ivan Varichev, Valery Vatenin, Gleb Verner, Vasily Vikulov, Edvard Virzhikovsky, Lazar Yazgur, Vecheslav Zagonek, Elena Zhukova, and others most prominent painters of the Leningrad School.

In the Department of Sculptures were exhibited art works of 28 sculptors. There were Victor Bazhinov, Alexander Ignatiev, Alexander Murzin, Vladimir Stepanov, and others most prominent sculptors of Leningrad.

In the Department of graphics were presented a creation of 63 artists. There were Alexander Galerkin, Yuri Mezhirov, Nikolai Muratov, Yaroslav Nikolaev, Alexei Pakhomov, Varlen Pen, Tatiana Shishmareva, Vladimir Vetrogonsky, Victor Wilner, Rudolf Yakhnin, Vladimir Zhukov, Vasily Zvontsov, and others most prominent graphic artists of the Leningrad.

== Contributed Artworks ==
For exposition were selected art works created in 1968-1969, also some earlier works. All they were exhibited in the first time. Some of them were subsequently found in the collections of Soviet Art museums, as well as domestic and foreign galleries and collectors.

Portrait was presented of "Saleswoman of seeds" by Dzovinar Becarian, "Portrait of the woman artist" by Lidia Davidenkova, "Girl student freshman" by Valery Lednev, "Portrait of artist Leonid Ptytsin" by Yuri Pavlov, "Portrait of the Mikhail Ekaterininsky, People's Artists" by Varlen Pen, "Portrait of father" by Boris Shamanov, "Student Girl" by Nina Suzdaleva, and others.

Genre painting was presented of "At the pond" by Veniamin Borisov, "Waiting" by Leonid Fokin, "Overnight of geologists" by Vladimir Frentz, "Fishermen" by Oleg Gadalov, "The Rain. Study for the painting" by Maya Kopitseva, "Oil" by Boris Maluev, "Free-kick" by Vasily Oreshkin, "Horse Racing" by Victor Otiev, "Casting Yard" by Tamara Polosatova, "Horses" by Ivan Varichev, and others.

Landscape, Seascape and Cityscape were presented of "Olive trees" by Evgenia Antipova, "By the spring" by Vsevolod Bazhenov, "Blooming trees" by German Egoshin, "On the Shore of White Sea", "Umba village in Karelia" by Nikolai Galakhov, "A new fence", "Crude Autumn" by Maya Kopitseva, "Ancient village", "Birches", "At the walls of the Monastery" by Victor Korovin, "In the Spring" by Mikhail Kozell, "May", "April" by Vladimir Krantz, "Dresden City", "Zwinger (Dresden)" by Boris Lavrenko, "In the Galf", "Rain in Leningrad" by Ivan Lavsky, "Oats" by Dmitry Maevsky, "Bukhara" by Alexander Naumov, "Ural region. The First snow", "Spring Nature", "An Autumn. The Northern Ural", "A Road to the Ladoga Lake" by Ivan Savenko, "A Morning in the forest", "A White night" by Vladimir Sakson, "Leningrad in the morning" by Alexander Semionov, "The Night" by Boris Shamanov, "The bank of the Volkhov River" by Alexander Shmidt, "A Red House", "Blooming Pussy-Willow", "Flowering", "A Hoarfrost" by Kim Slavin, "April day" by German Tatarinov, "Spring Day", "Autumn", "First snow" by Ivan Varichev, "Spring tracery", "Alley in Narva town" by Valery Vatenin, "Early spring" by Lazar Yazgur, "Comes May. Snowdrops", "Blossomed Bird-Cherry", "Alder and Willow branches" by Vecheslav Zagonek, "On the banks of the Volkhov River" by Elena Zhukova, and others.

Still life paintings were presented of "A Window. Nasturtiums" by Evgenia Antipova, "Still life with cornflowers" by Irina Dobrekova, "The spines" by German Egoshin, "Apricots", "Still life with Pineapple" by Maya Kopitseva, "Flowers", "A Lilac" by Lidia Milova, "Still life with Melon" by Genrikh Pavlovsky, "Wildflowers" by Boris Shamanov, "Wistarias", "A Branch of Apricot" by Elena Skuin, "Spring still life" by Elena Zhukova, and others.

== Acknowledgment ==
Spring Exhibition of Leningrad artists of 1969 was widely covered in press and in literature on Soviet fine art.

== See also ==
- Fine Art of Leningrad
- Leningrad School of Painting
- 1969 in fine arts of the Soviet Union
- Saint Petersburg Union of Artists
- Socialist realism

== Sources ==
- Каталог весенней выставки произведений ленинградских художников 1969 года. Л., Художник РСФСР, 1970.
- Справочник членов Ленинградской организации Союза художников РСФСР. Л., Художник РСФСР, 1980.
- Художники народов СССР. Биобиблиографический словарь. Т.1-4. М., Искусство, 1970-1995.
- Справочник членов Союза художников СССР. Т.1-2. М., Советский художник, 1979.
- Хроника узловых событий художественной жизни России 1960-1980-х годов // Time for Change. The Art of 1960-1985 in the Soviet Union. Saint Petersburg, State Russian Museum, 2006.
- Sergei V. Ivanov. Unknown Socialist Realism. The Leningrad School. Saint Petersburg, NP-Print Edition, 2007. P.395, 417, 442. ISBN 5-901724-21-6, ISBN 978-5-901724-21-7
- Юбилейный Справочник выпускников Санкт-Петербургского академического института живописи, скульптуры и архитектуры имени И. Е. Репина Российской Академии художеств. 1915—2005. Санкт Петербург, «Первоцвет», 2007.
