= Boris Fogel =

Russian painter (1872–1961)

Boris Alexandrovich Fogel
- Born: 18 January 1872; Buynaksk, Russian Empire
- Died: 1961 (aged 88–89); Leningrad, USSR
- Education: Imperial Academy of Arts
- Known for: Painting, Teaching
- Movement: Realism

Boris Alexandrovich Fogel (Russian: Борис Александрович Фогель) (18 January 1872 in Buynaksk, Russian Empire – 1961 in Leningrad) was a Russian and Soviet painter and art educator who lived and worked in Leningrad, a member of the Leningrad Union of the Soviet Artists, and a professor of painting at the Repin Institute of Arts who played an important role in the formation of the Leningrad School of Painting.

== Biography ==
Boris Alexandrovich Fogel was born on 18 January 1872 in Buynaksk on North Caucasus. His father, a career military colonel, had spent most of his life involved in campaigns for the conquest of the Caucasus. His mother, née Olga Flovitskaya, was a close relative of the artist Konstantin Flavitsky.

In 1880, after the death of his father, Boris moved with his mother to Tbilisi. While studying in high school, he engaged in drawing at the private studio of A. Zakharov. In 1891 Fogel moved to Moscow, where he joined the medical faculty at Moscow University. Concomitantly he continued his studies in painting, additionally benefiting from the advice of known artists Vasily Polenov, Vladimir Makovsky, Konstantin Korovin, and Sergei Korovin. He was then, for about a year, engaged in the private studio of Leonid Pasternak.

In 1896 Fogel lived and studied in Paris. After returning to Saint Petersburg, Fogel joined the Imperial Academy of Fine Arts, where he studied under the tutelage of Ilya Repin and P. O. Kovalevsky. In 1902 he graduated as an artist of painting, his graduate work named «An Evening». From 1934 until his death Fogel taught at the Repin Institute of Arts. He was a member of the Leningrad Union of Artists.

== See also ==
- Leningrad School of Painting
- List of 20th-century Russian painters
- List of painters of Saint Petersburg Union of Artists
- Saint Petersburg Union of Artists

== Sources ==
- Центральный Государственный Архив литературы и искусства. СПб. Ф.78. Оп.3. Д.67.
- Выставка произведений ленинградских художников 1951 года. Каталог. — Л: Лениздат, 1951. — с.21.
- Весенняя выставка произведений ленинградских художников 1953 года. Каталог. — Л: ЛССХ, 1953. — с.8.
- 1917 — 1957. Выставка произведений ленинградских художников. Каталог. — Л: Ленинградский художник, 1958. — с.33.
- Осенняя выставка произведений ленинградских художников 1958 года. Каталог. — Л: Художник РСФСР, 1959. — с.28.
