= Sergei Yefimovich Zakharov =

Russian painter

- Born: 26 November 1900; Alexandrovsk-Sakhalinsky, Sakalin Island, Russian Empire
- Died: 24 January 1993 (aged 92); Saint Petersburg, Russian Federation
- Known for: Painting, Watercolors, Design
- Movement: Realism

Sergei Yefimovich Zakharov (Russian: Серге́й Ефи́мович Заха́ров; 26 November 1900, in the town of Alexandrovsk-Sakhalinsky, Sakalin Province, Russian Empire – 24 January 1993, Saint Petersburg, Russian Federation) was a Russian Soviet painter, watercolorist, graphic artist, and interior designer.He lived and worked in Leningrad (now Saint Petersburg). He was a member of the Leningrad Union of Artists, and regarded as one of the brightest representatives of the Leningrad school of painting and graphics, most famous for his watercolors of fruits and flowers.

== Biography ==
Sergei Yefimovich Zakharov was born on 26 November 1900 in the town of Alexandrovsk-Sakhalinsky located on Sakhalin Island near the Tatar Strait on the western shores of Northern Sakhalin, at the foot of the Western Sakhalin Mountains.

In 1927, Sergei Zakharov graduated from the Tomsk Institute of Architecture and Construction.

Starting in 1928, Zakharov participated in art exhibitions. He painted still lifes, portraits, landscapes and genre scenes, and he worked in watercolours, tempera and monumental painting.

From the 1930 to the 1950s, Zakharov worked a lot in Soviet Tajikistan, where he designed the interiors of public buildings. In 1951 he was awarded the honorary title of the Honored Art Worker of the Tadzhik Republic.

Zakharov was most famous for his watercolour paintings of fruits and flowers, and also for paintings devoted to Central Asia. He is regarded as an outstanding master of watercolours, working in the technique of watercolour pouring. His personal exhibitions were in Leningrad (1951, 1980, 1984), Saint Petersburg (1996) and Moscow (1961, 1965).

Zakharov became a member of the Leningrad Union of Artists in 1938.

Sergei Efimovich Zakharov died in Saint Petersburg in 1993. His paintings and watercolors reside in the State Russian Museum, State Tretyakov Gallery, and scattered across numerous art museums and private collections in Russia, Italy, England, the United States and throughout the world.

== See also ==
- Fine Art of Leningrad
- Leningrad School of Painting
- List of Russian artists
- List of 20th-century Russian painters
- List of painters of Saint Petersburg Union of Artists
- Saint Petersburg Union of Artists

== Sources ==
- Artists of the USSR. Biography and Bibliography Dictionary. Vol. 4, Part 1. - Moscow: Iskusstvo, 1983. - pp. 254–255.
- Directory of members of the Leningrad branch of Union of Artists of Russian Federation. - Leningrad: Khudozhnik RSFSR, 1987. - p. 47.
- Matthew C. Bown. Dictionary of 20th Century Russian and Soviet Painters 1900-1980s. - London: Izomar, 1998. ISBN 0-9532061-0-6, ISBN 978-0-9532061-0-0.
- Sergei V. Ivanov. Unknown Socialist Realism. The Leningrad School. - Saint Petersburg: NP-Print Edition, 2007. – pp. 244, 245, 363, 382–385, 387–391, 394, 396–398, 400, 401, 411, 413–415, 418–420, 442–444. ISBN 5-901724-21-6, ISBN 978-5-901724-21-7.
