= Valeria Larina =

Russian artist (1926-2008)

Valeria Borisovna Larina
- Born: April 10, 1926; Leningrad, USSR
- Died: February 25, 2008 (aged 81); Saint Petersburg, Russian Federation
- Education: Repin Institute of Arts
- Known for: Painting, Graphics
- Movement: Realism

Valeria Borisovna Larina (Russian: Вале́рия Бори́совна Ла́рина; April 10, 1926 – February 25, 2008) was a Russian Soviet realist painter and graphic artist who lived and worked in Saint Petersburg (formerly Leningrad). She was a member of the Saint Petersburg Union of Artists (known as the Leningrad branch of Union of Artists of Russian Federation prior to 1992) and is regarded as a representative of the Leningrad school of painting.

== Biography ==
Valeria Borisovna Larina was born April 10, 1926, in Leningrad, USSR.

In 1946, Valeria Larina entered the first course of the Leningrad Institute of Painting, Sculpture and Architecture named after Ilya Repin. There she studied under Piotr Belousov, Ivan Stepashkin, and Alexander Zaytsev.

In 1953, Valeria Larina graduated from the Leningrad Institute of Painting, Sculpture and Architecture as a painter in Boris Ioganson's workshop. Her peers included Mark Klionsky, Leonid Kabachek, Izzat Klychev, Konstantin Molteninov, Vladimir Seleznev, Nikolai Galakhov, and other young artists. One of Larina's final works prior to her graduation was a genre painting named "Young Shipbuilders".

Following her graduation, Larina participated in art exhibitions. She painted portraits, genre scenes, landscapes, still lifes, and sketches from daily life. In the 1950s she was most famous for her series of expressive portraits of steel-makers and workers from the Kirov plant in Leningrad. Later, she painted mainly portraits of females and etudes of nature.

Starting in 1954, Valeria Larina was a member of the Leningrad Union of Artists (now the Saint Petersburg Union of Artists).

Valeria Borisovna Larina died in Saint Petersburg in 2008. Her paintings are located in museums and private collections in Russia, England, Germany, France, Italy, the U.S., and other nations.

== Sources ==
- Saint-Pétersbourg - Pont-Audemer. Dessins, Gravures, Sculptures et Tableaux du XX siècle du fonds de L' Union des Artistes de Saint-Pétersbourg. - Pont-Audemer: 1994. - p. 106.
- Sergei V. Ivanov. Unknown Socialist Realism. The Leningrad School. - Saint Petersburg: NP-Print Edition, 2007. – pp. 115, 269, 327, 364, 390, 392-394, 400, 415, 416. ISBN 5-901724-21-6, ISBN 978-5-901724-21-7.
