= Yuri Khukhrov =

Russian painter

Yuri Dmitrievich Khukhrov
- Born: May 14, 1932; Leningrad, USSR
- Died: November 22, 2003 (aged 71); Saint Petersburg, Russian Federation
- Education: Repin Institute of Arts
- Known for: Painting, Graphics, Art education
- Movement: Realism

Yuri Dmitrievich Khukhrov (Russian: Ю́рий Дми́триевич Хухро́в; May 14, 1932 – November 22, 2003) was a Russian Soviet realist painter, graphic artist, and art teacher, who lived and worked in Saint Petersburg (former Leningrad). He was a member of the Saint Petersburg Union of Artists (before 1992 named as the Leningrad branch of Union of Artists of Russian Federation), and regarded by art historian Sergei V. Ivanov as one of representatives of the Leningrad school of painting.

== Biography ==
Yuri Dmitrievich Khukhrov was born May 14, 1932, in Leningrad.

In 1945-46 Yuri Khukhrov visited Art studio at the Leningrad Palace of Young Pioneers, where he studied of noted art educators S. Levina, and N. Tikhomirova. In 1947–1952 he studied at the Leningrad Secondary Art School under the All-Union Academy of Fine Arts, where he studied of Galina Risina, Mikhail Kozell, and Alexei Kuznetsov.

In 1952 after graduation Secondary Art School Yuri Khukhrov was adopted at the first course of Department of Painting at the Leningrad Institute of Painting, Sculpture and Architecture named after Ilya Repin, where he studied under Vasily Sokolov, Valery Pimenov, Leonid Khudiakov, Alexander Zaytsev, Grigory Chepets.

In 1958 Yuri Khukhrov has graduated from the Leningrad Institute of Painting, Sculpture and Architecture in Boris Ioganson studio, together with Valentina Monakhova, Vecheslav Ovchinnikov, Yaroslav Serov, Alexander Stolbov, and other young artists. His graduation work was genre painting "Red Army cavalrymen"

Since 1958 Yuri Khukhrov has participated in Art Exhibitions. He painted portraits, landscapes, cityscapes, genre paintings, still life, etudes done from nature. His personal exhibitions were in Leningrad (1958, 1970) and Saint-Petersburg (1995, 1997, 2004).

In 1962–1969 years, Yuri Khukhrov taught painting and drawings at the Leningrad Higher School of Industrial Art named after Vera Mukhina.

Yuri Khukhrov was a member of the Saint Petersburg Union of Artists (before 1992 named as the Leningrad branch of Union of Artists of Russian Federation) since 1958.

Yuri Dmitrievich Khukhrov died November 22, 2003, in Saint Petersburg. His paintings reside in Art museums and private collections in the Russia, Finland, in the U.S., France, and throughout the world.

== See also ==
- List of Russian artists
- List of 20th-century Russian painters
- List of painters of Saint Petersburg Union of Artists
- List of the Russian Landscape painters
- Saint Petersburg Union of Artists
- 1957 in Fine Arts of the Soviet Union

== Bibliography ==
- Ленинград. Зональная выставка. — Л: Художник РСФСР, 1965. — с.60.
- Третья республиканская художественная выставка «Советская Россия». Каталог. — М: Министерство культуры РСФСР, 1967. — с.42.
- Наш современник. Каталог выставки произведений ленинградских художников 1971 года. — Л: Художник РСФСР, 1972. — с.23.
- Богданов A. О нашем современнике// Вечерний Ленинград, 1971, 5 апреля.
- Наш современник. Третья выставка произведений ленинградских художников 1973 года. Каталог. — Л: Художник РСФСР, 1974. — с.12.
- Богданов А. Ярче, но и глубже // Вечерний Ленинград, 1973, 25 декабря.
- Весенняя выставка произведений ленинградских художников. Каталог. — Л: Художник РСФСР, 1974. — с.11.
- Наш современник. Зональная выставка произведений ленинградских художников 1975 года. Каталог. — Л: Художник РСФСР, 1980. — с.27.
- Выставка произведений ленинградских художников, посвященная 60-летию Великого Октября. — Л: Художник РСФСР, 1982. — с.23.
- Осенняя выставка произведений ленинградских художников. 1978 года. Каталог. — Л: Художник РСФСР, 1983. — с.17.
- Справочник членов Союза художников СССР. Том 2. — М: Советский художник, 1979. — с.524.
- Зональная выставка произведений ленинградских художников 1980 года. Каталог. — Л: Художник РСФСР, 1983. — с.26.
- Выставки советского изобразительного искусства. Справочник. Том 5. 1954—1958 годы. — М: Советский художник, 1981. — с.556.
- Справочник членов Ленинградской организации Союза художников РСФСР. — Л: Художник РСФСР, 1987. — с.141.
- Ленинградские художники. Живопись 1950—1980 годов. Каталог. — Санкт — Петербург: Выставочный центр ПСХ, 1994. — с.6.
- Этюд в творчестве ленинградских художников. Выставка произведений. Каталог. — Санкт — Петербург: Мемориальный музей Н. А. Некрасова, 1994. — с.6.
- Связь времен. 1932—1997. Художники — члены Санкт — Петербургского Союза художников России. Каталог выставки. — Санкт — Петербург: ЦВЗ «Манеж», 1997. — с.300.
- Юрий Хухров. Живопись. Графика. СПб., Петрополь, 2004.
- Sergei V. Ivanov. Unknown Socialist Realism. The Leningrad School. - Saint Petersburg: NP-Print Edition, 2007. – pp. 9, 20, 21, 27, 299, 301, 372, 393-401, 404, 405, 407, 416-420, 422-424, 446. ISBN 5-901724-21-6, ISBN 978-5-901724-21-7.

== VIDEO ==
- Portrait painting of 1920-1990s. The Leningrad School. Part 1
