= Sergei Frolov (artist) =

Russian painter

Sergei Kuzmich Frolov
- Born: 26 September 1924; Baklanka, Vologda Governorate, USSR
- Died: 2 January 1998 (aged 73); Saint Petersburg, Russia
- Education: Vera Mukhina Institute
- Known for: Painting, Graphics, Art education
- Movement: Realism

Sergei Kuzmich Frolov (Russian: Серге́й Кузьми́ч Фроло́в; 26 September 1924 in Baklanka, Vologda Governorate of the USSR – 1998 in Saint Petersburg, Russian Federation) was a Soviet, Russian realist painter, watercolorist, graphic artist, and art teacher, who lived and worked in Saint Petersburg (former Leningrad), a member of the Saint Petersburg Union of Artists (before 1992: the Leningrad branch of Union of Artists of Russian Federation). He was regarded as a representative of the Leningrad school of painting.

== Biography ==
Sergei Kuzmich Frolov was born on 26 September 1924 in the village Baklanka, Vologda Province of the USSR, into a peasant family.

In 1942 Frolov was drafted into the Red Army and took part in the Great Patriotic War of the Soviet people against Nazi Germany and its allies. He fought on the Central Front and the 1st Belorussian Front. He was wounded and given military awards.

In 1947 Sergei Frolov entered the Leningrad Higher School of Industrial Art, where he studied with art educators Piotr Buchkin, Alexander Lubimov, Konstantin Belokurov, Ivan Stepashkin.

In 1952 Sergei Frolov graduated from the Leningrad Higher School of Industrial Art named after Vera Mukhina, in Alexander Kazantsev workshop. His graduation work was decorative panel "Aircraft model constructors".

Since 1952 Sergei Frolov has participated in art exhibitions. He painted landscapes, portraits, genre scenes, worked in techniques of oil painting, watercolors, and drawing. His personal exhibitions were in Pushkin Museum-Reserve (1964) and in Leningrad (1972, 1987). Frolov most famous for the lyrical landscapes of Leningrad, its suburbs, and of ancient Russian towns.

In 1952-1955 and in 1965-1975, Frolov taught painting and graphics at the Vera Mukhina Institute.

Since 1956 Sergei Frolov was a member of the Leningrad Union of Artists.

Sergei Kuzmich Frolov died on 2 January 1998 in Saint Petersburg at 73 years old. His paintings and watercolors reside in State Russian Museum, in art museums and private collections in the Russia, Japan, Finland, France, and throughout the world.

== See also ==
- List of painters of Saint Petersburg Union of Artists
- Saint Petersburg Union of Artists

== Sources ==
- Exhibition of modern Soviet Painting. 1976. Gekkoso Gallery. Catalogue. Tokyo, 1976. - р.101,162.
- Sergei Frolov. Exhibition of works. Catalogue. Leningrad: Khudozhnik RSFSR, 1986.
- Peinture Russe. Catalogue. Paris: Drouot Richelieu, 18 February 1991. p. 7,44.
- Peinture Russe. Catalogue. Paris: Drouot Richelieu, 26 April 1991. p. 7,61.
- Sergei V. Ivanov. Unknown Socialist Realism. The Leningrad School. Saint Petersburg: NP-Print Edition, 2007. pp. 18, 19, 29, 195, 372, 389-392, 396, 397, 400, 402, 403, 414, 415, 418, 421, 445. ISBN 5-901724-21-6, ISBN 978-5-901724-21-7.
