= Tatiana Kopnina =

Russian painter

Tatiana Vladimirovna Kopnina
- Born: November 11, 1921; Krasnoyarsk, Soviet Russia
- Died: March 6, 2009 (aged 87); Saint Petersburg
- Education: Repin Institute of Arts
- Known for: Painting
- Movement: Realism

Tatiana Vladimirovna Kopnina (Russian: Татья́на Влади́мировна Копнина́; November 11, 1921 – March 6, 2009) was a Soviet Russian painter and art teacher who lived and worked in Leningrad - Saint Petersburg. She is regarded as one of the representatives of the Leningrad school of painting, and is most known for her portrait paintings.

== Biography ==
Kopnina was born November 11, 1921, in Krasnoyarsk, East Siberia, Soviet Russia. In 1950 she graduated from Ilya Repin Institute in Mikhail Avilov workshop. She was a pupil of Alexander Zaytsev, Genrikh Pavlovsky, and Semion Abugov.

Beginning in 1949, Kopnina participated in art exhibitions. She painted portraits, genre scenes, landscapes, and still lifes. She had a solo art exhibition in Leningrad in 1985.

Kopnina became a member of the Saint Petersburg Union of Artists in 1950. From 1960 to 1990 she worked as an art teacher in the Secondary Art School of Repin Institute of Arts in Leningrad.

Kopnina died on March 6, 2009, in Saint Petersburg. Her paintings are in museums and private collections in Russia, Japan, the U.S., China, and other countries.

== See also ==
- Leningrad School of Painting
- List of Russian artists
- List of 20th-century Russian painters
- List of painters of Saint Petersburg Union of Artists
- List of the Russian Landscape painters
- Saint Petersburg Union of Artists

== Bibliography ==
- Directory of members of the Leningrad branch of Union of Artists of Russian Federation. - Leningrad: Khudozhnik RSFSR, 1987. - p. 61.
- Matthew C. Bown. Dictionary of 20th Century Russian and Soviet Painters 1900-1980s. - London: Izomar, 1998. ISBN 0-9532061-0-6, ISBN 978-0-9532061-0-0.
- Vern G. Swanson. Soviet Impressionism. - Woodbridge, England: Antique Collectors' Club, 2001. - pp. 20–21. ISBN 1-85149-280-1, ISBN 978-1-85149-280-0.
- Sergei V. Ivanov. Unknown Socialist Realism. The Leningrad School.- Saint Petersburg: NP-Print Edition, 2007. – pp. 362, 388-394, 397, 398, 403, 405, 406. ISBN 5-901724-21-6, ISBN 978-5-901724-21-7.
- Anniversary Directory graduates of Saint Petersburg State Academic Institute of Painting, Sculpture, and Architecture named after Ilya Repin, Russian Academy of Arts. 1915 - 2005. - Saint Petersburg: Pervotsvet Publishing House, 2007.- p. 62. ISBN 978-5-903677-01-6.
