= Alexei Mozhaev =

Russian painter

Alexei Vasilievich Mozhaev
- Born: 5 October 1918; Vtoraya Sosnovka, Saratov Province, Soviet Russia
- Died: 23 January 1994 (aged 75); Saint Petersburg, Russian Federation
- Education: Repin Institute of Arts
- Known for: Painting, Art teaching
- Movement: Realism

Alexei Vasilievich Mozhaev (Russian: Алексе́й Васи́льевич Можа́ев, Alexej Vasiljevič Možajev; 5 October 1918 – 23 January 1994) was a Soviet Russian painter, graphic artist, and art teacher, lived and worked in Leningrad, a member of the Saint Petersburg Union of Artists (before 1992 known as the Leningrad branch of Union of Artists of Russian Federation), regarded as a representative of the Leningrad school of painting, most famous for his portrait painting.

== Biography ==
Alexei Vasilievich Mozhaev was born on 5 October 1918 in the village of Vtoraya Sosnovka, a suburb of the city of Saratov, on the Volga river.

In 1936, Alexei Mozhaev entered at the painting department of the Leningrad Institute of Painting, Sculpture and Architecture. He studied of Isaak Brodsky, Alexander Lubimov, Genrikh Pavlovsky.

In 1946, after the Great Patriotic War Alexei Mozhaev graduated from Leningrad Institute of Painting, Sculpture and Architecture named after Ilya Repin in Boris Ioganson's workshop. His graduation work was genre painting named "In Native Family", devoted to the postwar revival of the country.

Since 1936 Alexei Mozhaev has participated in Art Exhibitions. He painted portraits, genre and historical compositions, landscapes, worked in oil painting, pencil drawings, and watercolors. In 1946 he was admitted to the Leningrad Union of Artists. His solo exhibitions were in Leningrad (1982, 1989), Saint Petersburg (2008), and city of Pushkin (2010).

Alexei Mozhaev the most known for his portrait paintings. His individual style has development from an academic manner, based on strict objectivism and typing, towards a stronger expression in the transfer of individual characteristics and refinement of color. Painting by Alexei Mozhaev is based upon the loud light and shadow contrasts, exquisite plain-air transfer and tonal relationships. In further his painting style become more decorative and general.

Over the 30 years Mozhaev combined his creative activities with pedagogical work. He taught in Tavricheskaya Art School and the Secondary School of Arts (now the Artistic Lyceum named after Boris Ioganson of the Russian Academy of Arts).

Alexei Vasilievich Mozhaev died on 23 January 1994 in Saint Petersburg. His paintings reside in State Russian Museum, in Art museums and private collections in Russia, England, China, Japan, in the U.S., France and other countries.

== Sources ==
- Directory of members of the Leningrad branch of Union of Artists of Russian Federation. - Leningrad: Khudozhnik RSFSR, 1987. - p. 86.
- L' École de Leningrad. Catalogue. - Paris: Drouot Richelieu, 11 Juin 1990. - p. 98-99.
- Etudes done from nature by the Leningrad School's artists. Exhibition catalogue - Saint Petersburg: Nikolai Nekrasov Memorial museum, 1994. - p. 4.
- Lyrical motives in the works of artists of the war generation. Painting, drawings. Exhibition catalogue. - Saint Petersburg: Nikolai Nekrasov Memorial museum, 1995. - p. 4.
- Sergei V. Ivanov. Unknown Socialist Realism. The Leningrad School. - Saint Petersburg: NP-Print Edition, 2007. – pp. 274, 365, 387, 389, 390, 392, 394, 403, 413–416, 421. ISBN 5-901724-21-6, ISBN 978-5-901724-21-7.
- Anniversary Directory graduates of Saint Petersburg State Academic Institute of Painting, Sculpture, and Architecture named after Ilya Repin, Russian Academy of Arts. 1915 - 2005. - Saint Petersburg: Pervotsvet Publishing House, 2007.- p. 57. ISBN 978-5-903677-01-6.
- Margarita N. Sabinina. Alexei Mozhayev. - Saint Petersburg: NP-Print, 2009.
