= Valery Vatenin =

Russian painter

Valery Vladimirovich Vatenin
- Born: 27 January 1933; Leningrad, USSR
- Died: 16 June 1977 (aged 44); Leningrad, USSR
- Education: Repin Institute of Arts
- Known for: Painting
- Movement: Realism

Valery Vladimirovich Vatenin (Russian: Вале́рий Влади́мирович Вате́нин; 27 January 1933 – 16 June 1977) was a Russian Soviet realist painter, graphic artist, and art teacher, who lived and worked in Leningrad. He was a member of the Leningrad branch of Union of Artists of Russian Federation, and regarded as one of the brightest representatives of the "left wing" of the Leningrad school of painting.

== Biography ==
Valery Vladimirovich Vatenin was born on 27 January 1933 in Leningrad.

In 1947, Vatenin entered at Tavricheskaya Art School, which he has graduated in 1952. In 1953, he was accepted at the first course of Department of Painting at the Repin Institute of Arts, where he studied under, among others, Valery Pimenov, Leonid Khudiakov, and Alexander Zaytsev.

In 1959, he graduated from the Leningrad Institute of Painting, Sculpture and Architecture in Boris Ioganson studio, together with German Yegoshin, Alexandra Tokareva, Nikolai Furmankov, Boris Nikolaev, Valentina Rakhina, and other young artists. His graduation work was genre painting "On the Balcony"

Beginning in 1959, Vatenin participated in art exhibitions. He painted portraits, genre paintings, still lifes, worked in easel and monumental painting, as graphic artists and art teacher. His work was exhibited posthumously in his native Leningrad in 1985, and in Moscow in 1990.

In his paintings reality coexists with fiction. Portrait, landscape, still life shall lose canonical genre boundaries and appear as reflections the life in its complex spatial and temporal metamorphosis.

Vatenin was a member of the Leningrad Union of Artists since 1965. From 1965–73, he taught painting and drawing at the Department of General Painting of the Vera Mukhina Institute.

Vatenin died on 16 June 1977 in Leningrad as a result of a road accident. His paintings reside in State Russian Museum, State Tretyakov Gallery, in the Art museums and private collections in Russia, England, Japan, USA, and other countries.

== See also ==
- Exhibition of Eleven (Leningrad, 1972)
- Leningrad School of Painting
- List of Russian artists
- List of 20th-century Russian painters
- List of painters of Saint Petersburg Union of Artists
- Saint Petersburg Union of Artists

== Sources ==
- Artists of the peoples of the USSR. Biography Dictionary. Volume 2. - Moscow: Iskusstvo Edition, 1972. - p. 208.
- Natali Vatenina. Artist Valery Vatenin. - Leningrad: Aurora Edition, 1988.
- Matthew C. Bown. Dictionary of 20th Century Russian and Soviet Painters 1900-1980s. - London: Izomar, 1998. ISBN 0-9532061-0-6, ISBN 978-0-9532061-0-0.
- Time for change. The Art of 1960-1985 in the Soviet Union. - Saint Petersburg: State Russian Museum, 2006. - p. 217.
- Natali Vatenina. Artist Valery Vatenin. - Saint-Petersburg: Russian Collection, 2006.
- Sergei V. Ivanov. Unknown Socialist Realism. The Leningrad School. - Saint Petersburg: NP-Print Edition, 2007. – pp. 21, 24, 30, 296, 358, 393, 394, 396, 397, 399, 492, 407, 416, 418, 419, 421, 424, 439, 444. ISBN 5-901724-21-6, ISBN
- Логвинова Е. Круглый стол по ленинградскому искусству в галерее АРКА // Петербургские искусствоведческие тетради. Вып. 31. СПб, 2014. С.17-26.978-5-901724-21-7.
