= Yuri Pavlov =

Russian painter (1935–2015)

Yuri Mikhailovich Pavlov
- Born: 14 December 1935; Orenburg Oblast, USSR
- Died: 27 July 2015 (aged 79); Saint-Petersburg, Russia
- Known for: Painting
- Movement: Realism

Yuri Mikhailovich Pavlov (Russian: Юрий Михайлович Павлов; 14 December 1935 – 27 July 2015) was a Soviet Russian painter, member of the Saint Petersburg Union of Artists (before 1992 — the Leningrad Union of Artists), who live and work in Leningrad - Petersburg, regarded as one of representatives of the Leningrad school of painting.

== Biography ==
In 1962 Yuri Pavlov graduated from the Institute of Painting, Sculpture and Architecture in the Victor Oreshnikov workshop with the rank of artist of painting. His degree work was a painting titled "Anton Chekhov and Isaak Levitan".

Since 1964 Yuri Pavlov has participated in Art Exhibitions. In 1972 he took part in the famous Exhibition of eleven Leningrad artists. Pavlov paint portraits, landscapes, still life, genre compositions.

Pavlov died on 27 July 2015, at the age of 79.

== See also ==
- Fine Art of Leningrad
- Leningrad School of Painting
- List of 20th-century Russian painters
- List of painters of Saint Petersburg Union of Artists
- Saint Petersburg Union of Artists

== Sources ==
- Ленинград. Зональная выставка. Л., Художник РСФСР, 1965. C.39.
- Каталог весенней выставки произведений ленинградских художников 1965 года. Л., Художник РСФСР, 1970. C.23.
- Весенняя выставка произведений ленинградских художников 1969 года. Каталог. Л., Художник РСФСР, 1970. C.14.
- Губарев А., Дмитренко А. В простом, казалось бы, мотиве … // Вечерний Ленинград, 1971, 5 января.
- Наш современник. Каталог выставки произведений ленинградских художников 1971 года. Л., Художник РСФСР, 1972. C.17.
- Наш современник. Вторая выставка произведений ленинградских художников 1972 года. Каталог. Л., Художник РСФСР, 1973. C.9.
- Натюрморт. Выставка произведений ленинградских художников. Л., Художник РСФСР, 1973. C.11.
- Наш современник. Зональная выставка произведений ленинградских художников 1975 года. Каталог. Л., Художник РСФСР, 1980. C.21.
- Каталог выставки одиннадцати ленинградских художников. Л., Художник РСФСР, 1976.
- Изобразительное искусство Ленинграда. Каталог выставки. Л., Художник РСФСР, 1976. C.25.
- Выставка произведений ленинградских художников, посвящённая 60-летию Великого Октября. Л., Художник РСФСР, 1982. C.18.
- Осенняя выставка произведений ленинградских художников. 1978 года. Каталог. Л., Художник РСФСР, 1983. C.13.
- Справочник членов Союза художников СССР. Том 2. М., Советский художник, 1979. C.172.
- Зональная выставка произведений ленинградских художников 1980 года. Каталог. Л., Художник РСФСР, 1983. C.19.
- Леняшин В. Поиски художественной правды // Художник. 1981, № 1. С.8-17.
- Левандовский С. Живопись на Ленинградской зональной // Искусство. 1981, № 2. С.63.
- Справочник членов Ленинградской организации Союза художников РСФСР. Л., Художник РСФСР, 1987. C.97.
- Выставка произведений 26 ленинградских и московских художников. Каталог. Л., Художник РСФСР, 1990. C.30-31, 50.
- Интерьер и натюрморт. Выставка произведений живописи художников Российской Федерации. Каталог. Л., Художник РСФСР, 1991. C.53.
- Связь времён. 1932—1997. Художники — члены Санкт — Петербургского Союза художников России. Каталог выставки. Санкт-Петербург, ЦВЗ «Манеж», 1997. C.294.
- Русская деревня. Выставка произведений петербургских художников. Живопись. Графика. СПб., Мемориальный музей Н. А. Некрасова, 1998.
- Художники круга 11-ти. Из коллекции Николая Кононихина. СПб, Мемориальный музей Н. А. Некрасова, 2001. С.3.
- Художники — городу. Выставка к 70-летию Санкт-Петербургского Союза художников. Каталог. Санкт-Петербург, Петрополь, 2003. C.67.
- Sergei V. Ivanov. Unknown Socialist Realism. The Leningrad School. Saint Petersburg: NP-Print Edition, 2007. P.397,406,446. ISBN 5-901724-21-6, ISBN 978-5-901724-21-7
- Юбилейный Справочник выпускников Санкт-Петербургского академического института живописи, скульптуры и архитектуры имени И. Е. Репина Российской Академии художеств. 1915—2005. Санкт Петербург., «Первоцвет», 2007. C.93.
- Академическая дача. Каталог выставки. Санкт-Петербург, Санкт-Петербургский Союз художников, 2009. C.27.
