= Andrei Mylnikov =

Russian painter (1919 - 2012)

Andrei Andreevich Mylnikov
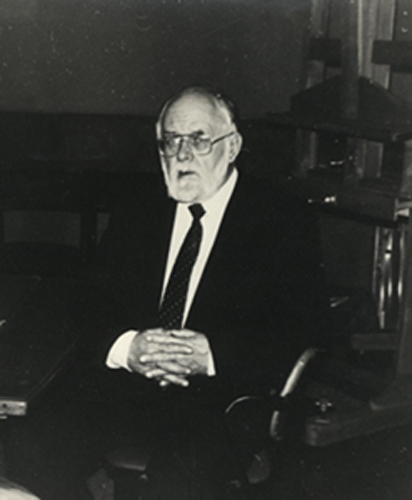
- Born: 22 February 1919; Pokrovsk, Saratov Governorate, USSR
- Died: 16 May 2012 (age 93); Saint Petersburg, Russia
- Education: Repin Institute of Arts
- Known for: Painting, Teaching
- Movement: Realism
- Awards: Order of Lenin, Hero of Socialist Labour

Andrei Andreevich Mylnikov (Russian: Андре́й Андре́евич Мы́льников) (22 February 1919 in Pokrovsk, Saratov Governorate – 16 May 2012 in Saint Petersburg) was a Russian and Soviet painter and art educator, People's Artist of the Russian Federation, Stalin Prize winner, and Lenin Prize winner, who lived and worked in Saint Petersburg. He was a member of the Saint Petersburg Union of Artists (former Leningrad Union of Artists), and professor of painting of the Repin Institute of Arts, regarded as one of the brightest representatives of the Soviet art, who played an important role in the formation of the Leningrad school of painting.

== Biography ==
Mylnikov was born in 1919 in Pokrovsk, Saratov Governorate. In 1946, Mylnikov graduated from the Repin Institute of Painting, Sculpture and Architecture, a student of Igor Grabar and Victor Oreshnikov. In 1948, he graduated from the graduate school of the same institute. Professor since 1957. For more than 50 years Mylnikov taught in the Repin Institute of Arts. He is a Head of personal studio of Monumental painting. At the same time, he was head of the Department of Painting of Repin Institute. In 1990, he was awarded the Honorary Title «Hero of Socialist Labour».

== See also ==
- Fine Art of Leningrad
- Leningrad School of Painting
- List of 20th-century Russian painters
- List of painters of Saint Petersburg Union of Artists
- Saint Petersburg Union of Artists

== Sources ==
- Грабарь И. Дипломники всероссийской академии художеств // Творчество, 1947, №1(94). С.20,21.
- Выставка произведений ленинградских художников. 1947 год. Живопись. Скульптура. Графика. Театрально-декорационная живопись. Каталог. Л., ЛССХ, 1948.
- Бойков В. Изобразительное искусство Ленинграда. Заметки о выставке ленинградских художников // Ленинградская правда, 1947, 29 ноября.
- Мочалов Л. Выставка без жюри. Новые работы ленинградских живописцев // Вечерний Ленинград, 1956, 11 декабря.
- Бродский В. Жизнеутверждающее искусство // Ленинградская правда, 1957, 11 октября.
- Бетхер-Остренко И. Художественная летопись истории // Вечерний Ленинград, 1964, 28 января.
- Кривенко И. «Ленинград» (раздел живописи) // Художник. 1965, № 3. С.27-36.
- Третья Республиканская художественная выставка «Советская Россия». Каталог. М., МК РСФСР, 1967. С.38.
- Аникушин М. О времени и о себе // Вечерний Ленинград, 1967, 17 октября.
- Арбузов Г. С мыслью о родине // Ленинградская правда, 1972, 10 октября.
- Яковлева Л. Величие подвига // Вечерний Ленинград, 1975, 27 мая.
- Губарев А. На полотнах - человек труда. Выставка «Наш современник» // Ленинградский рабочий, 1975, 11 октября.
- Вишняков Б. Девиз: Наш современник. Заметки с V Республиканской выставки «Советская Россия» // Правда, 1975, 7 декабря.
- Леняшин В. Думая о будущем. Время. Художник. Творчество // Вечерний Ленинград, 1976, 26 января.
- Изобразительное искусство Ленинграда. Каталог выставки. — Л: Художник РСФСР, 1976. — с.24,86.
- Exhibition of modern Soviet Painting. 1976. Gekkoso Gallery. Catalogue. Tokyo, 1976. P.82-83,164.
- Выставка произведений ленинградских художников, посвященная 60-летию Великого Октября. — Л: Художник РСФСР, 1982. — с.17.
- Дмитренко А. Человек на своей земле // Ленинградская правда, 1977, 20 ноября.
- Леняшин В. Поиски художественной правды // Художник. 1981, № 1. С.8-17.
- Справочник членов Ленинградской организации Союза художников РСФСР. Л., Художник РСФСР, 1987. C.89.
- Иванов С. Инвестиции в советскую живопись: ленинградская школа // Петербургские искусствоведческие тетради. Вып. 31. СПб, 2014. С.54-60.
