= Alexander Lubimov =

Russian painter

Alexander Mikhailovich Lyubimov
- Born: 25 February 1879; Paltsevo, Kursk Province, Russian Empire
- Died: 19 December 1955 (aged 76); Leningrad, USSR
- Education: Imperial Academy of Arts
- Known for: Painting, graphics, education
- Movement: Realism

Alexander Mikhailovich Lyubimov (Russian: Алекса́ндр Миха́йлович Люби́мов, Alexandr Mihajlovič Ljubimov; 25 February 1879 – 19 December 1955) was a Russian painter and draughtsman, active in St. Petersburg (later Leningrad) and, occasionally, Kharkiv from Tsar Nicholas II's reign through Stalin's rule, particularly known for his portrait paintings and satirical drawings.

== Biography ==
Alexander Mikhailovich Lyubimov was born on 25 February 1879 in the village of Paltsevo, Kursk Province, Russian Empire. The artist's father was a nobleman, his mother was born of peasants.

Since 1892, he lived in Saint Petersburg. In 1895–1901 Alexander Lyubimov studied in Central School of Technical Drawing (now known as Saint Petersburg State Art and Industry Academy named after Alexander von Stieglitz), then in the Drawing School of the Imperial Society for the Encouragement of the Arts.

Since 1901 Alexander Lyubimov worked as an extern at the Higher School of Arts at the Imperial Academy of Fine Arts in the studio of Ilya Repin, later of Pavel Chistyakov. After graduation in 1909, Alexander Lyubimov went to city of Kharkiv, Ukraine, where by recommendation of Ilya Repin he headed in the years 1912–1919 Kharkov Art College, where his student was Alexander Deyneka.

Since 1900, Alexander Lyubimov has participated in Art Exhibitions. He painted portraits, genre paintings, landscapes, sketches from the life. Alexander Lyubimov worked as painter, graphic artist, illustrator, and satirical black-and-white artist. His personal exhibitions were in 1949 in Leningrad, and in 1998 in Saint Petersburg.

In 1927, Alexander Lyubimov returned to Leningrad. From 1934 to 1941 by invitation of Isaak Brodsky, he taught at the Leningrad Institute of Painting, Sculpture and Architecture, managed jointly with Isaak Brodsky individual workshop and graduate students. He was professor of painting since 1939. His students were well-known Russian painters Alexander Laktionov, Yuri Neprintsev, Alexander Gritzay, Piotr Belousov, Nikolai Timkov, Mikhail Kozell, Alexei Mozhaev, and others.

In 1949–1955 years Alexander Lyubimov taught in the Higher School of Art and Industry named after Vera Mukhina as professor of painting.

Alexander Lyubimov was a member of the Leningrad Union of Artists since 1932.

Alexander Mikhailovich Lyubimov died in Leningrad in 1955. Paintings by Alexander Lyubimov are in State Russian Museum, State Tretyakov Gallery, in Art museums and private collections in the Russia, France, the U.S., Italy, England, and others.

== See also ==
- Fine Art of Leningrad
- Leningrad School of Painting

== Bibliography ==
- Exhibition of works by Leningrad artists dedicated to the 40th Anniversary of the complete liberation of Leningrad from the enemy blockade. – Leningrad: Khudozhnik RSFSR, 1989. – p. 11.
- Matthew C. Bown. Dictionary of 20th Century Russian and Soviet Painters 1900-1980s. – London: Izomar 1998. ISBN 0-9532061-0-6, ISBN 978-0-9532061-0-0.
- Alexander Mikhailovich Lubimov. Painting, Drawing, Caricature. – Moscow: Artist and Book Edition, 2001. – 96 p.
- Irina Romanycheva. Academic Dacha. History and traditions. – Saint Petersburg: Petropol Publishing House, 2009. – p. 35.
- Sergei V. Ivanov. Unknown Socialist Realism. The Leningrad School. – Saint Petersburg: NP-Print Edition, 2007. – pp. 9, 15, 18, 20, 24, 27, 29, 31, 42, 90, 364, 389–401, 403–406, 414–424, 439. ISBN 5-901724-21-6, ISBN 978-5-901724-21-7.
