= Mikhail Tkachev =

Russian painter

- Михаил Ткачёв
- Born: November 10, 1912; Kalach, Voronezh Governorate, Russian Empire
- Died: December 10, 2008 (aged 96); Saint Petersburg, Russia
- Education: Tavricheskaya Art School
- Known for: Painting
- Movement: Realism
- Awards: Honored Artist of Russia

Mikhail Evdokimovich Tkachev (Russian: Михаил Евдокимович Ткачёв; November 10, 1912 – December 10, 2008) was a Soviet, Russian painter, Honored Artist of Russian Federation, lived and worked in Saint Petersburg, regarded as one of the representatives of the Leningrad school of painting, most famous for his landscape paintings.

== Biography ==
Mikhail Evdokimovich Tkachev was born November 10, 1912, in the large cossack stanitsa of Kalach, Voronezh Province, Russian Empire, located at the confluence of the Tolucheyevka River and Podgornaya River, 294 kilometers (183 mi) from Voronezh. The Kalach was established in 1716 and was granted town status in 1945.

In 1929 the family moved to the city of Armavir, where Michael Tkachev goes to the Artistic and Technical School, which graduated in 1932.

Since 1932 Michael Tkachev in Leningrad. In 1932-1937 he attend an evening class of Tavricheskaya Art School, then the Art Studio of the Leningrad House of Officers of Red Army, studied of Mikhail Avilov, Sergei Prisyolkov, Pavel Naumov, Yefim Cheptsov.

In 1939-1945 Mikhail Tkachev took part in the Red Army in the Winter War (1939–1940) and in the Second World War. He was wounded and received military awards.

Since 1951 Mikhail Tkachev has participated in Art Exhibitions. Painted portraits, landscapes, genre and battle compositions. Solo Exhibitions by Mikhail Tkachev were in Leningrad (1986) and Saint Petersburg(1992).

Leading themes of Mikhail Tkachev paintings were images of native land and a memory of wartime. The most picturesque his studies from the life with the parental home and the surrounding Kalach. The colors restrained, with a predominance of green and ocher tones. Painting based on the transfer of light and shadow effects, tonal relations and the constructive role of drawing.

Mikhail Tkachev is a member of the Saint Petersburg Union of Artists (before 1992 - Leningrad branch of Union of Artists of Russian Federation) since 1952, a Member of Peter's Academy of Sciences and Arts (1995).

In 1996, Mikhail Tkachev was awarded the honorary title of Honored Artist of Russian Federation.

Mikhail Evdokimovich Tkachev died on December 10, 2008, in Saint Petersburg. His paintings reside in Art museums and private collections in Russia, France, in the U.S., Finland, Germany, England, Japan, and other countries.

== Honours and awards ==
- Order of the Red Star
- Order of the Patriotic War 1st class
- Medal "For the Defence of Leningrad"
- Medal "For the Defence of the Caucasus"
- Medal "For the Capture of Königsberg"
- Medal "For the Victory over Germany in the Great Patriotic War 1941–1945"

== See also ==
- Leningrad School of Painting
- List of Russian artists
- List of 20th-century Russian painters
- List of painters of Saint Petersburg Union of Artists
- List of the Russian Landscape painters
- Saint Petersburg Union of Artists

== Sources ==
- Matthew C. Bown. Dictionary of 20th Century Russian and Soviet Painters 1900-1980s. - London: Izomar, 1998. ISBN 0-9532061-0-6, ISBN 978-0-9532061-0-0.
- Vern G. Swanson. Soviet Impressionism. - Woodbridge, England: Antique Collectors' Club, 2001. - ISBN 1-85149-280-1, ISBN 978-1-85149-280-0.
- Tkachev Mikhail. Painting. Drawing. - Saint Petersburg: 2002.
- Artists of Peter's Academy of Arts and Sciences. - Saint Petersburg: Ladoga Edition, 2008. - pp. 178–179.
- Sergei V. Ivanov. Unknown Socialist Realism. The Leningrad School. - Saint Petersburg: NP-Print Edition, 2007. – pp. 18, 371, 389–393, 396, 397, 402–406, 439, 445. ISBN 5-901724-21-6, ISBN 978-5-901724-21-7.
