= Alexander Zaytsev (artist) =

Russian painter

Alexander Dmitrievich Zaytsev
- Born: 3 June 1903; Blagoveshchensk, Russian Empire
- Died: 12 May 1982 (aged 78); Leningrad, USSR
- Resting place: Severnoye Cemetery, St. Petersburg
- Education: Repin Institute of Arts
- Known for: Painting, Teaching
- Movement: Realism
- Awards: Order of Lenin

External image
- Avenir Parkhomenko, Alexander Zaytsev, 1971, oils; Museum of the Academy of Arts, St. Petersburg

Alexander Dmitrievich Zaytsev (Russian: Алекса́ндр Дми́триевич За́йцев; 3 June 1903 — 12 May 1982) was a Russian painter during the Soviet era, active in Leningrad, primarily known for his genre and landscape pictures. He was a member of the Leningrad Union of Artists, and professor of painting of the Repin Institute of Arts, who played an important role in the formation of the Leningrad school of painting.

== Biography ==
Alexander Dmitrievich Zaytsev was born on 3 June 1903 in Blagoveshchensk city on Amur River. In 1920-1924 he studied in Blagoveshchensk School of Industrial Art. In 1924 he comes to Leningrad and enters the VHUTEIN, where he studied with Osip Braz and Vasily Savinsky. In 1930 Zaytsev graduated from Art Institute as an artist of painting, his graduate work was a picture named «May Day in Leningrad».

Alexander Zaytsev participated in Art Exhibitions since 1928. He painted genre paintings, portraits, landscapes, and still lifes. In 1928-1932 Zaitsev was a member and exhibitor of the Leningrad association «Circle of Artists». Since 1932 he was a member of the Leningrad Union of the Soviet Artists. In 1930-1982 Alexander Zaytsev taught at the Repin Institute. He was Ph.D. in Art History (1943) and professor of painting since 1948, a Honored Art Worker of Russian Federation (1967), a head of personal studio of painting (1963–1982). In 1971 he was awarded the Order of Lenin.

Among his most known paintings were «Stonemasons» (1929), «Motherhood» (1930), «A Foundry of the Baltic Plant» (1933), «Fishermen on Onega Lake» (1935), «Kivach waterfall» (1938), «On the Neva river» (1947), «On the North» (1950), «A Spring» (1955), «Spring in Samarkhand» (1956), «Working settlement» (1957), «Night on the Neva river» (1963), «A Portrait of fisher women Busarova» (1964), «Toilers of the Sea» (1967), «Lenin and Maxim Gorky in Gorki» (1970), «Twilights», «In fishing collective farm in the North» (both 1975), and others.(1964), «Toilers of the Sea» (1967), «Lenin and Maxim Gorky in Gorki» (1970), «Twilights» and «In a Fishing Collective Farm in the North» (both 1975), and others.

== Pupils ==
- Nikolai Baskakov
- Dmitry Belyaev
- Zlata Bizova
- Valery Vatenin
- Nina Veselova
- Tatiana Gorb
- Abram Grushko
- Alexei Eriomin
- Vecheslav Zagonek
- Leonid Kabachek
- Tatiana Kopnina
- Maya Kopitseva
- Valeria Larina
- Sergei Lastochkin
- Anatoli Levitin
- Oleg Lomakin
- Valentina Monakhova
- Nikolai Mukho
- Alexander Naumov
- Anatoli Nenartovich
- Vladimir Proshkin
- Igor Razdrogin
- Galina Rumiantseva
- Mikhail Trufanov
- Yuri Tulin
- Nikolai Furmankov
- Boris Kharchenko
- Yuri Khukhrov
- Vladimir Chekalov
- Vitaliy Semenchenko
- and a lot of others.

== See also ==
- Leningrad School of Painting
- List of 20th-century Russian painters
- List of painters of Saint Petersburg Union of Artists
- Saint Petersburg Union of Artists

== Publications ==
- Zaytsev, Alexander D. (1975). "Профессор Академии художеств О. Э. Браз". Вопросы художественного образования (in Russian) (14). Leningrad: Repin Institute of Fine Arts: 43–59.

== Sources ==
- Выставка произведений ленинградских художников. 1947 год. Живопись. Скульптура. Графика. Театрально-декорационная живопись. Каталог. Л., ЛССХ, 1948.
- Бойков В. Изобразительное искусство Ленинграда. Заметки о выставке ленинградских художников // Ленинградская правда, 1947, 29 ноября.
- Осенняя выставка произведений ленинградских художников. 1956 года. Каталог. — Л: Ленинградский художник, 1958. — с.11.
- 1917 — 1957. Выставка произведений ленинградских художников. Каталог. — Л: Ленинградский художник, 1958. — с.14.
- Ленинград. Зональная выставка. — Л: Художник РСФСР, 1965. — с.21.
- Наш современник. Зональная выставка произведений ленинградских художников 1975 года. Каталог. — Л: Художник РСФСР, 1980. — с.15.
- Изобразительное искусство Ленинграда. Каталог выставки. — Л: Художник РСФСР, 1976. — с.19.
- Справочник членов Союза художников СССР. Том 1. — М: Советский художник, 1979. — с.389.
- Справочник членов Ленинградской организации Союза художников РСФСР. — Л: Художник РСФСР, 1980. — с.43.
- Художники народов СССР. Биобиблиографический словарь. — М: Искусство, 1983. — с.186-187.
- Matthew Cullerne Bown. A Dictionary of Twentieth Century Russian And Soviet Painters. 1900 — 1980s. — London: Izomar Limited, 1998.
- Sergei V. Ivanov. Unknown Socialist Realism. The Leningrad School. Saint Petersburg, NP-Print Edition, 2007. P.13, 15, 19, 357–360, 362, 364–366, 368, 371–373, 382, 384, 387, 398. ISBN 5-901724-21-6, ISBN 978-5-901724-21-7.
- Юбилейный Справочник выпускников Санкт-Петербургского академического института живописи, скульптуры и архитектуры имени И. Е. Репина Российской Академии художеств. 1915—2005. СПб., Первоцвет, 2007. С.35.
- Государственный Русский музей. Живопись первой половины ХХ века (К) / Альманах. Вып.226. СПб., Palace Edition, 2008. С.110-111.
