= Semion Rotnitsky =

Russian painter

Semion Aronovich Rotnitsky
- Born: 28 December 1915; Minsk, Russian Empire
- Died: 2004 (aged 88–89); Saint Petersburg, Russia
- Education: Repin Institute of Arts
- Known for: Painting
- Movement: Realism
- Awards: Order of the Red Star; Order of the Patriotic War; Medal "For the Victory Over Germany"; Medal "For the Defence of Leningrad"

Semion Aronovich Rotnitsky (Russian: Семён Аронович Ротницкий; 28 December 1915 — 2004) was a Soviet Russian painter, Honored Art worker of Tatar Republic, a member of the Saint Petersburg Union of Artists (before 1992 — the Leningrad Union of Artists), who lived and worked in Leningrad.

Rotnitsky is regarded as a representative of the Leningrad school of painting, most famous for his portrait paintings. From 1948 through 1960 he was a senior lecturer and director at the Kazan Art School. His memoirs are titled "The Strength of the Beauty".

== See also ==
- Leningrad School of Painting
- List of 20th-century Russian painters
- List of painters of Saint Petersburg Union of Artists
- Saint Petersburg Union of Artists

== Sources ==
- Кривенко И. «Ленинград» (раздел живописи) // Художник. 1965, № 3. С.27-36.
- Наш современник. Выставка произведений ленинградских художников. Каталог. — Л: Художник РСФСР, 1972. - с.19.
- Арбузов Г. С мыслью о родине. // Ленинградская правда, 1972, 10 октября.
- Мямлин И. Сердце с правдой вдвоём... / Ленинградская правда, 1975, 1 июня.
- Изобразительное искусство Ленинграда. Каталог выставки. — Л: Художник РСФСР, 1976. — с.28.
- Выставка произведений ленинградских художников, посвященная 60-летию Великого Октября. — Л: Художник РСФСР, 1982. — с.20.
- Левандовский С. Живопись на Ленинградской зональной // Искусство. 1981, № 2. С.63.
- Справочник членов Ленинградской организации Союза художников РСФСР. — Л: Художник РСФСР, 1987. — с.111.
- Семен Аронович Ротницкий. Выставка произведений. Каталог. — Л: Художник РСФСР, 1991.
- Matthew Cullerne Bown. A Dictionary of Twentieth Century Russian And Soviet Painters. 1900 — 1980s. — London: Izomar Limited, 1998.
- Ротницкий С. Сила красоты. Записки художника. СПб., 2000.
- Vern G. Swanson. Soviet Impressionism. - Woodbridge, England: Antique Collectors' Club, 2001. - Р. 172, 206.
- Юбилейный Справочник выпускников Санкт-Петербургского Государственного академического института живописи, скульптуры и архитектуры имени И. Е. Репина Российской Академии художеств. 1915—2005. СПб, 2007. С. 59.
- Ленинградская живописная школа. Соцреализм 1930—1980. СПб, Коломенская Верста, 2008.
- Иванов С. Инвестиции в советскую живопись: ленинградская школа // Петербургские искусствоведческие тетради. Вып. 31. СПб, 2014. С.54-60.
