= 1978 in fine arts of the Soviet Union =

The year 1978 was marked by many events that left an imprint on the history of Soviet and Russian fine arts.

== Events ==
- Exhibition of works by Nikolai Ovchinnikov was opened in the Leningrad Union of Artists.
- Exhibition of works by Elena Skuin was opened in the Leningrad Union of Artists.

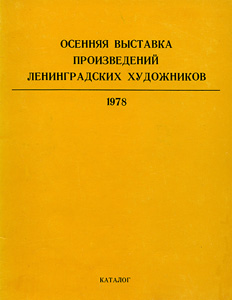
Exhibition Catalog

- Autumn Exhibition of works by Leningrad artists of 1978 was opened in the Leningrad Union of Artists. The participants were Piotr Alberti, Taisia Afonina, Irina Baldina, Nikolai Baskakov, Evgenia Baykova, Vsevolod Bazhenov, Piotr Belousov, Veniamin Borisov, Zlata Bizova, Dmitry Buchkin, Lev Chegorovsky, Evgeny Chuprun, Sergei Frolov, Nikolai Galakhov, Vladimir Gorb, Irina Dobrekova, German Egoshin, Alexei Eriomin, Mikhail Kaneev, Yuri Khukhrov, Maya Kopitseva, Elena Kostenko, Nikolai Kostrov, Anna Kostrova, Gevork Kotiantz, Mikhail Kozell, Marina Kozlovskaya, Vladimir Krantz, Anatoli Levitin, Dmitry Maevsky, Gavriil Malish, Boris Maluev, Eugene Maltsev, Yuri Mezhirov, Nikolai Mukho, Vera Nazina, Alexander Naumov, Dmitry Oboznenko, Victor Otiev, Yuri Pavlov, Varlen Pen, Evgeny Pozdniakov, Valentina Rakhina, Semion Rotnitsky, Alexander Semionov, Yuri Shablikin, Boris Shamanov, Alexander Stolbov, Alexander Tatarenko, German Tatarinov, Nikolai Timkov, Leonid Tkachenko, Yuri Tulin, Vitaly Tulenev, Boris Ugarov, Ivan Varichev, Anatoli Vasiliev, German Yegoshin, Ruben Zakharian, Elena Zhukova, and other Leningrad artists.

== Deaths ==
- March 3 — Vasily Yefanov (Russian: Ефанов Василий Прокофьевич), Russian soviet painter, People's Artist of the USSR, Stalin Prize winner (born 1900).
- June 10 — Nikolai Pozdneev (Russian: Позднеев Николай Матвеевич), Russian soviet painter (born 1930).
- June 22 — Vladimir Ovchinnikov, (Russian: Овчинников Владимир Иванович), Russian soviet painter (born 1911).
- Jule 13 — Andrei Khaustov, (Russian: Хаустов Андрей Иванович), Russian soviet sculptor (born 1930).
- Jule 18 — Evgeny Kybrik (Russian: Кибрик Евгений Адольфович), Russian soviet graphic artist, People's Artist of the USSR, Stalin Prize winner (born 1906).

== See also ==
- List of Russian artists
- List of painters of Leningrad Union of Artists
- Saint Petersburg Union of Artists
- Russian culture

== Sources ==
- Всесоюзная художественная выставка «60 героических лет». Каталог. — М: Советский художник, 1978.
- Осенняя выставка произведений ленинградских художников. Каталог. Л., Художник РСФСР, 1978.
- Скуинь Елена Петровна. Выставка произведений. Каталог. Л., Художник РСФСР, 1980.
- Николай Васильевич Овчинников. Каталог выставки. Живопись. Графика. М., Советский художник, 1978.
- Artists of Peoples of the USSR. Biobibliography Dictionary. Vol. 1. Moscow, Iskusstvo, 1970.
- Artists of Peoples of the USSR. Biobibliography Dictionary. Vol. 2. Moscow, Iskusstvo, 1972.
- Directory of Members of Union of Artists of USSR. Volume 1,2. Moscow, Soviet Artist Edition, 1979.
- Directory of Members of the Leningrad branch of the Union of Artists of Russian Federation. Leningrad, Khudozhnik RSFSR, 1980.
- Artists of Peoples of the USSR. Biobibliography Dictionary. Vol. 4 Book 1. Moscow, Iskusstvo, 1983.
- Directory of Members of the Leningrad branch of the Union of Artists of Russian Federation. - Leningrad: Khudozhnik RSFSR, 1987.
- Artists of peoples of the USSR. Biobibliography Dictionary. Vol. 4 Book 2. - Saint Petersburg: Academic project humanitarian agency, 1995.
- Link of Times: 1932 - 1997. Artists - Members of Saint Petersburg Union of Artists of Russia. Exhibition catalogue. - Saint Petersburg: Manezh Central Exhibition Hall, 1997.
- Matthew C. Bown. Dictionary of 20th Century Russian and Soviet Painters 1900-1980s. - London: Izomar, 1998.
- Vern G. Swanson. Soviet Impressionism. - Woodbridge, England: Antique Collectors' Club, 2001.
- Петр Фомин. Живопись. Воспоминания современников. СПб., 2002. С.107.
- Время перемен. Искусство 1960—1985 в Советском Союзе. СПб., Государственный Русский музей, 2006.
- Sergei V. Ivanov. Unknown Socialist Realism. The Leningrad School. - Saint-Petersburg: NP-Print Edition, 2007. - ISBN 5-901724-21-6, ISBN 978-5-901724-21-7.
- Anniversary Directory graduates of Saint Petersburg State Academic Institute of Painting, Sculpture, and Architecture named after Ilya Repin, Russian Academy of Arts. 1915 - 2005. - Saint Petersburg: Pervotsvet Publishing House, 2007.
