= 1976 in fine arts of the Soviet Union =

The year 1976 was marked by many events that left an imprint on the history of Soviet and Russian Fine Arts.

== Events ==
- The Retrospective Exhibition «Fine Arts of the Leningrad» was opened in Moscow in the Central Exhibition Hall «Manezh». The participants were Mikhail Avilov, Evgenia Antipova, Nathan Altman, Irina Baldina, Nikolai Baskakov, Yuri Belov, Piotr Belousov, Dmitry Belyaev, Mikhail Bobyshov, Olga Bogaevskaya, Lev Bogomolets, Nikolai Brandt, Isaak Brodsky, Dmitry Buchkin, Piotr Buchkin, Lev Chegorovsky, Rudolf Frentz, Nikolai Galakhov, Vasily Golubev, Abram Grushko, Oleg Eremeev, Alexei Eriomin, Mikhail Kaneev, Engels Kozlov, Marina Kozlovskaya, Maya Kopitseva, Boris Korneev, Victor Korovin, Elena Kostenko, Nikolai Kostrov, Anna Kostrova, Gevork Kotiantz, Boris Kustodiev, Boris Lavrenko, Oleg Lomakin, Alexander Lubimov, Dmitry Maevsky, Vladimir Malevsky, Gavriil Malish, Boris Maluev, Yuri Mezhirov, Evsey Moiseenko, Andrei Mylnikov, Mikhail Natarevich, Vera Nazina, Yuri Neprintsev, Samuil Nevelshtein, Dmitry Oboznenko, Victor Oreshnikov, Sergei Osipov, Lia Ostrova, Vladimir Ovchinnikov, Alexei Pakhomov, Yuri Pavlov, Genrikh Pavlovsky, Varlen Pen, Kuzma Petrov-Vodkin, Nikolai Pozdneev, Stepan Privedentsev, Alexander Pushnin, Valentina Rakhina, Semion Rotnitsky, Ivan Savenko, Vladimir Sakson, Gleb Savinov, Alexander Samokhvalov, Vladimir Seleznev, Alexander Semionov, Arseny Semionov, Joseph Serebriany, Boris Shamanov, Nadezhda Shteinmiller, Elena Skuin, Galina Smirnova, Alexander Sokolov, Victor Teterin, Nikolai Timkov, Mikhail Trufanov, Yuri Tulin, Boris Ugarov, Ivan Varichev, Anatoli Vasiliev, Valery Vatenin, Nina Veselova, German Yegoshin, Vecheslav Zagonek, Sergei Zakharov, Alexander Zaytsev, Elena Zhukova, and other important Leningrad artists.
- Exhibition of works by Nikolai Timkov was opened in the Leningrad Union of Artists.
- Exhibition of works by Engels Kozlov was opened in the Leningrad Union of Artists.

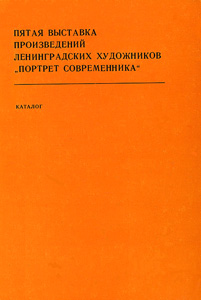
Exhibition Catalog

- Fifth Exhibition of Leningrad artists «A Portrait of Our Contemporary» was opened in Russian museum. The participants were Taisia Afonina, Nikolai Baskakov, Nikolai Galakhov, Tatiana Gorb, Alexei Eriomin, Mikhail Kaneev, Boris Korneev, Elena Kostenko, Anna Kostrova, Engels Kozlov, Marina Kozlovskaya, Mikhail Kozell, Valeria Larina, Boris Lavrenko, Oleg Lomakin, Dmitry Maevsky, Yuri Mezhirov, Mikhail Natarevich, Vera Nazina, Samuil Nevelshtein, Lev Orekhov, Victor Oreshnikov, Vladimir Ovchinnikov, Pen Varlen, Semion Rotnitsky, Vladimir Seleznev, Arseny Semionov, Alexander Semionov, Boris Shamanov, Alexander Stolbov, Alexander Tatarenko, Yuri Tulin, Vitaly Tulenev, Alexander Shmidt, Igor Veselkin, Ruben Zakharian, Maria Zubreeva, and other important Leningrad artists.

== Deaths ==
- January 1 — Aminadav Kanevsky, (Russian: Каневский Аминадав Моисеевич), Soviet graphic artist, People's Artist of the USSR, (b. 1898).
- July 31 — Evgeny Katsman, (Russian: Кацман Евгений Александрович), Soviet painter and graphic artist, People's Artist of the USSR, (b. 1890).
- August 8 — Georgy Bibikov (Russian: Бибиков Георгий Николаевич), Russian soviet painter, graphic artist, and theatre artist (b. 1903).

== Gallery of 1976 ==
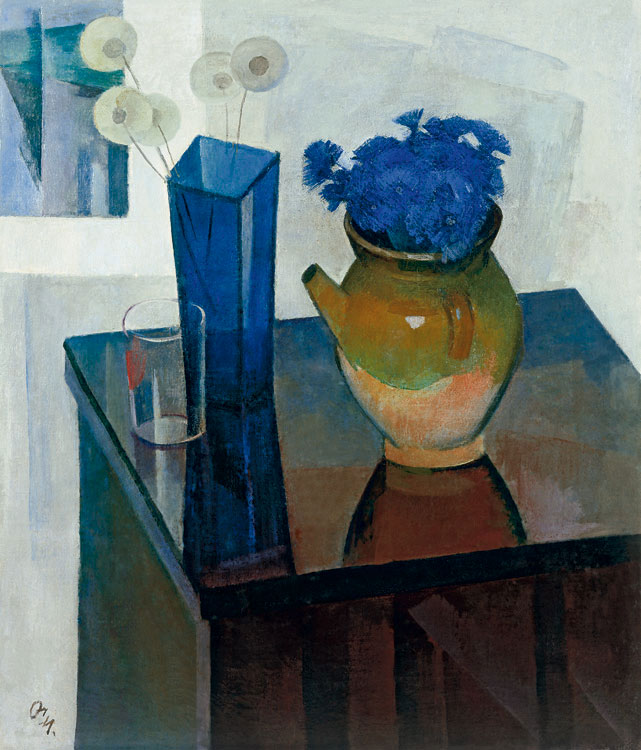
S. Osipov
Cornflowers. 1976

== See also ==
- List of Russian artists
- List of painters of Leningrad Union of Artists
- Saint Petersburg Union of Artists
- Russian culture

== Sources ==
- Николай Ефимович Тимков. Выставка произведений. Каталог. Л., Художник РСФСР, 1975.
- Романычева И. Пейзажи родины // Вечерний Ленинград, 1976, 18 мая.
- Всесоюзная художественная выставка «Слава труду». М., Советский художник, 1976.
- Изобразительное искусство Ленинграда. Каталог выставки. Л., Художник РСФСР, 1976.
- Портрет современника. Пятая выставка произведений ленинградских художников 1976 года. Каталог. Л., Художник РСФСР, 1983.
- Энгельс Васильевич Козлов. Выставка произведений. Каталог. Л., Художник РСФСР, 1976.
- Artists of Peoples of the USSR. Biobibliography Dictionary. Vol. 1. Moscow, Iskusstvo, 1970.
- Artists of Peoples of the USSR. Biobibliography Dictionary. Vol. 2. Moscow, Iskusstvo, 1972.
- Directory of Members of Union of Artists of USSR. Volume 1,2. Moscow, Soviet Artist Edition, 1979.
- Directory of Members of the Leningrad branch of the Union of Artists of Russian Federation. Leningrad, Khudozhnik RSFSR, 1980.
- Artists of Peoples of the USSR. Biobibliography Dictionary. Vol. 4 Book 1. Moscow, Iskusstvo, 1983.
- Directory of Members of the Leningrad branch of the Union of Artists of Russian Federation. - Leningrad: Khudozhnik RSFSR, 1987.
- Artists of peoples of the USSR. Biobibliography Dictionary. Vol. 4 Book 2. - Saint Petersburg: Academic project humanitarian agency, 1995.
- Link of Times: 1932 - 1997. Artists - Members of Saint Petersburg Union of Artists of Russia. Exhibition catalogue. - Saint Petersburg: Manezh Central Exhibition Hall, 1997.
- Matthew C. Bown. Dictionary of 20th Century Russian and Soviet Painters 1900-1980s. - London: Izomar, 1998.
- Vern G. Swanson. Soviet Impressionism. - Woodbridge, England: Antique Collectors' Club, 2001.
- Петр Фомин. Живопись. Воспоминания современников. СПб., 2002. С.107.
- Время перемен. Искусство 1960—1985 в Советском Союзе. СПб., Государственный Русский музей, 2006.
- Sergei V. Ivanov. Unknown Socialist Realism. The Leningrad School. - Saint-Petersburg: NP-Print Edition, 2007. - ISBN 5-901724-21-6, ISBN 978-5-901724-21-7.
- Anniversary Directory graduates of Saint Petersburg State Academic Institute of Painting, Sculpture, and Architecture named after Ilya Repin, Russian Academy of Arts. 1915 - 2005. - Saint Petersburg: Pervotsvet Publishing House, 2007.
