= Autumn Exhibition (Leningrad, 1978) =

1978 Soviet art exhibition

Autumn Exhibition of Leningrad artists of 1978. Catalog
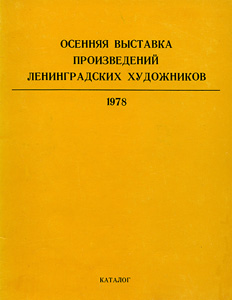
- Year: 1978
- Location: Leningrad Union of Soviet Artists Exhibition Halls; Leningrad

Autumn Exhibition of Leningrad artists of 1978 (Russian: Осенняя выставка произведений ленинградских художников 1978 года) opened in Exhibition Halls of the Leningrad Union of Soviet Artists and became one of the largest art exhibitions of 1978 in the USSR.

== History and Organization ==
A special exhibition committee which consisted of the most authoritative art-experts was formed to organise and prepare the exhibit. A catalog of the exhibition was published. In total, the exhibition displayed almost 1100 works of art by painters, sculptors, graphic artists, artists of theater and cinema, and masters of arts and crafts. The event involved over 650 artists of Leningrad.

== Contributing Artists ==
In the largest department, Painting, the works of 300 artists appeared. These included Piotr Alberti, Taisia Afonina, Irina Baldina, Nikolai Baskakov, Evgenia Baykova, Vsevolod Bazhenov, Piotr Belousov, Veniamin Borisov, Boris F Borzin, Zlata Bizova, Dmitry Buchkin, Lev Chegorovsky, Evgeny Chuprun, Sergei Frolov, Nikolai Galakhov, Vladimir Gorb, Irina Dobrekova, German Egoshin, Alexei Eriomin, Mikhail Kaneev, Yuri Khukhrov, Maya Kopitseva, Elena Kostenko, Nikolai Kostrov, Anna Kostrova, Gevork Kotiantz, Mikhail Kozell, Marina Kozlovskaya, Vladimir Krantz, Anatoli Levitin, Dmitry Maevsky, Gavriil Malish, Boris Maluev, Eugene Maltsev, Yuri Mezhirov, Nikolai Mukho, Vera Nazina, Alexander Naumov, Dmitry Oboznenko, Victor Otiev, Yuri Pavlov, Varlen Pen, Evgeny Pozdniakov, Valentina Rakhina, Semion Rotnitsky, Alexander Semionov, Yuri Shablikin, Boris Shamanov, Alexander Stolbov, Alexander Tatarenko, German Tatarinov, Nikolai Timkov, Leonid Tkachenko, Yuri Tulin, Vitaly Tulenev, Boris Ugarov, Ivan Varichev, Anatoli Vasiliev, German Yegoshin, Ruben Zakharian, Elena Zhukova, and others - the most prominent painters of the Leningrad School.

In the Department of Sculptures were exhibited art works of 76 sculptors. Department of graphics presented the creations of 177 artists.

== Contributed Artworks ==
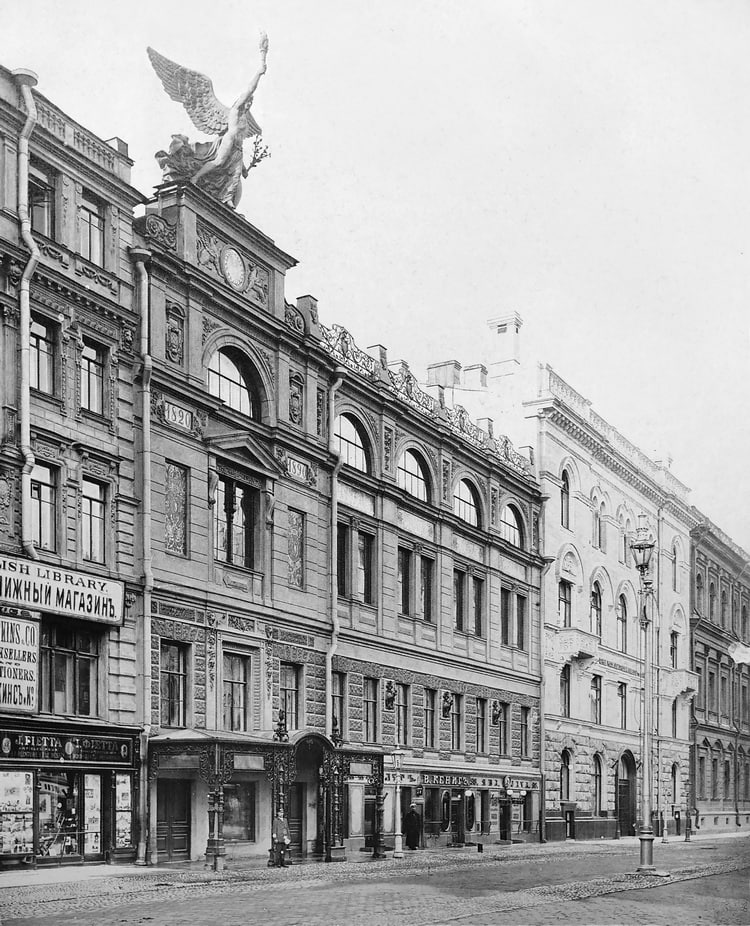
Building of the Leningrad Union of Soviet Artists on the Bolshaya Morskaya st. (formerly, the Imperial Society for the Encouragement of the Arts (1912)

For the Exhibition were selected art works created in 1977-1978, as well as some earlier works. All were exhibited for the first time. Some of them were subsequently added to the collections of Soviet Art museums, as well as domestic and foreign galleries and collectors.

Portraits were presented: "Portrait of a Korean woman Tamara" by Taisia Afonina, "Portrait of a surgeon" by Piotr Belousov, "My Grandmother" by Veniamin Borisov, "Portrait of Riyn Urg" by Lev Chegorovsky, "Loneliness" by Lev Chegorovsky, "Stanislav", "Student" by Yuri Khukhrov, "Selfportrait", "Portrait of art critic Kryzhanovskaya" by Elena Kostenko, "Portrait of Bochkin, a Hero of Socialist Labor", "Engineer Masha Soboleva" by Anatoli Levitin, "Portrait of Kirill Lavrov, actor of cinema and theater" by Yuri Mezhirov, "Portrait of artist Leonid Ptitsyn" by Yuri Pavlov, "Portrait of wife", "Portrait of artist Yaroslav Nikolaev" by Varlen Pen, "Portrait of mother, actress Anna Plekhanova" by Alexander Tatarenko, "Portrait of son" by Boris Ugarov, "Andrey" by Elena Zhukova, and others.

Genre paintings included "Lenin in Switzerland" by Piotr Belousov, "After work", "Spring care" by Zlata Bizova, "Loneliness" by Lev Chegorovsky, "At the 5th Heat power plant" by Evgeny Chuprun, "A Spring" by Alexei Eriomin, "In Art Studio" by Vladimir Gorb, "Prophet" by Eugene Maltsev, "Plovdiv" by Boris Maluev, "Concerto for piano", "Concert with the ballerina" by Leonid Tkachenko, "Grandma's mirror" by Vitaly Tulenev, "Night grazing" by Boris Ugarov, and others.

Landscapes and Cityscapes featured "A Lake" by Piotr Alberti, "Spring on the Volkhov River" by Nikolai Baskakov, "The Last Snow" by Vsevolod Bazhenov, "Abandoned house", "Pesochnaya embankment" by Dmitry Buchkin, "House in Pogost village", "Bathhouses are stoked" by Alexei Eriomin, "Kem town. A Winter is coming" by Nikolai Galakhov, "Chukhloma", "Leningrad courtyard", "Nevsky Prospekt" by Mikhail Kaneev, "Autumn garden", "Rowan tree" by Maya Kopitseva, "In an autumn attire", "Near Pudost village" by Mikhail Kozell, "Ravine", "Old linden alley", "Petrogradskaya Storona district of the Leningrad" by Marina Kozlovskaya, "April" by Vladimir Krantz, "Sunny May", "Cool May" by Dmitry Maevsky, "Mouth of the Neva River" by Nikolai Mukho, "Bukhara. Rainy day" by Alexander Naumov, "In the wood", "A Window" by Vera Nazina, "Warm spring day", "Golden forest", "Spring song", "Summer Garden" by Dmitry Oboznenko, "On the Black Sea", "Beach in Jamete" by Victor Otiev, "Autumn" by Varlen Pen, "Rainy day in Terentievo village", "Autumn Twilight" by Evgeny Pozdniakov, "A Canal in winter", "Shkipersky protok street in Leningrad" by Valentina Rakhina, "Forest Lake", "Windy day in Tolmachyovo" by Semion Rotnitsky, "Furmanov street", "At the Saint Isaac's Square", "Summer Garden in Autumn" by Alexander Semionov, "Before Sunset" by Yuri Shablikin, "Landscape with tractor" by Alexander Stolbov, "Bird cherry blossomed", "Melody of Autumn" by German Tatarinov, "Torzhok", "A Winter", "Rains" by Nikolai Timkov, "Terpigorie village", "Crimea. Kipchak village" by Yuri Tulin, "Lopino village", "Autumn in Zastenje village", "Banks of the Volkhov River" by Ivan Varichev, "Spring on Mstino Lake" by Anatoli Vasiliev, "Streets of Paris", "Tatar houses", "Krasnokamenka village" by German Yegoshin, "Spring on the Okhta", "Gulf", "Relict of the Past" by Elena Zhukova, and others.

Still life paintings were presented of "Flowers" by Irina Baldina, "Autumn Bouquet" by Evgenia Baykova, "Flowers and Sink" by Vladimir Gorb, "Sunflowers" by Irina Dobrekova, "Plums and Pears", "Lilies of the valley", "Plums and pears" by Maya Kopitseva, "Still life", "Still life with a book" by Gevork Kotiantz, "Jug and Fruits", "Bread with Black Jug" by Gavriil Malish, "Peonies and green sofa" by Valentina Rakhina, "Flowers of North", "A White night. A Lilac" by Boris Shamanov, "Still life with Red Tray" by Alexander Stolbov, "Golden fish" by Yuri Tulin, "Countryside Still life" by Anatoli Vasiliev, "A Lilac" by Ruben Zakharian, and others.

== Acknowledgment ==
The Autumn Exhibition of Leningrad artists of 1978 was widely covered in the press and in literature on Soviet fine art.

== See also ==
- Fine Art of Leningrad
- 1978 in fine arts of the Soviet Union
- Leningrad School of Painting
- Saint Petersburg Union of Artists

== Sources ==
- Осенняя выставка произведений ленинградских художников 1978 года. Каталог. Л., Художник РСФСР, 1983.
- Кекушева Г. Осенняя традиционная // Ленинградская правда, 1978, 28 ноября.
- Справочник членов Ленинградской организации Союза художников РСФСР. Л., Художник РСФСР, 1980.
- Художники народов СССР. Биобиблиографический словарь. Т.1-4. М., Искусство, 1970-1995.
- Справочник членов Союза художников СССР. Т.1-2. М., Советский художник, 1979.
- Хроника узловых событий художественной жизни России 1960-1980-х годов // Time for Change. The Art of 1960-1985 in the Soviet Union. Saint Petersburg, State Russian Museum, 2006.
- Sergei V. Ivanov. Unknown Socialist Realism. The Leningrad School. Saint Petersburg, NP-Print Edition, 2007. P.396, 417, 442. ISBN 5-901724-21-6, ISBN 978-5-901724-21-7
- Юбилейный Справочник выпускников Санкт-Петербургского академического института живописи, скульптуры и архитектуры имени И. Е. Репина Российской Академии художеств. 1915—2005. Санкт Петербург, «Первоцвет», 2007.
