= Exhibition of Leningrad artists (1950) =

Soviet art exhibition

Exhibition of Leningrad artists. Leningrad, 1950. Catalog
- Year: 1950
- Location: State Russian Museum; Leningrad

Exhibition of Leningrad artists of 1950 (Russian: Выставка произведений ленинградских художников 1950 года) became one of the notable events in Art live of Leningrad of the beginning of 1950s. The Exhibition took place in the State Russian Museum.

== History and Organization ==
The exhibition was opened in the end of 1950. The organization and preparation of the annual Exhibition of Leningrad artists engaged a specially formed Exhibition Committee which consisted of 23 authoritative art-experts. It was published a Catalog of the exhibition. Exhibition displayed works of art of leading Leningrad painters, sculptors, and graphics artists.

== Contributing Artists ==
In the largest Department of Painting were exhibited art works of 79 authors. There were Mikhail Avilov, Nathan Altman, Vsevolod Bazhenov, Mikhail Bobyshov, Olga Bogaevskaya, Lev Bogomolets, Rudolf Frentz, Vladimir Gorb, Nikolai Kostrov, Anna Kostrova, Felix Lembersky, Vladimir Malagys, Evsey Moiseenko, Andrei Mylnikov, Mikhail Natarevich, Yuri Neprintsev, Yaroslav Nikolaev, Sergei Osipov, Genrikh Pavlovsky, Varlen Pen, Stepan Privedentsev, Gleb Savinov, Alexander Samokhvalov, Joseph Serebriany, Victor Teterin, Nikolai Timkov, Yuri Tulin, Rostislav Vovkushevsky, Vecheslav Zagonek, Ruben Zakharian, Sergei Zakharov, Elena Zhukova, and others most prominent painters of the Leningrad School.

In the Department of Sculptures were exhibited art works of 54 sculptors. Department of graphics presented a creation of 78 artists. In the Department of Theater and Cinema were exhibited art works of 23 artists.

== Contributed Artworks ==
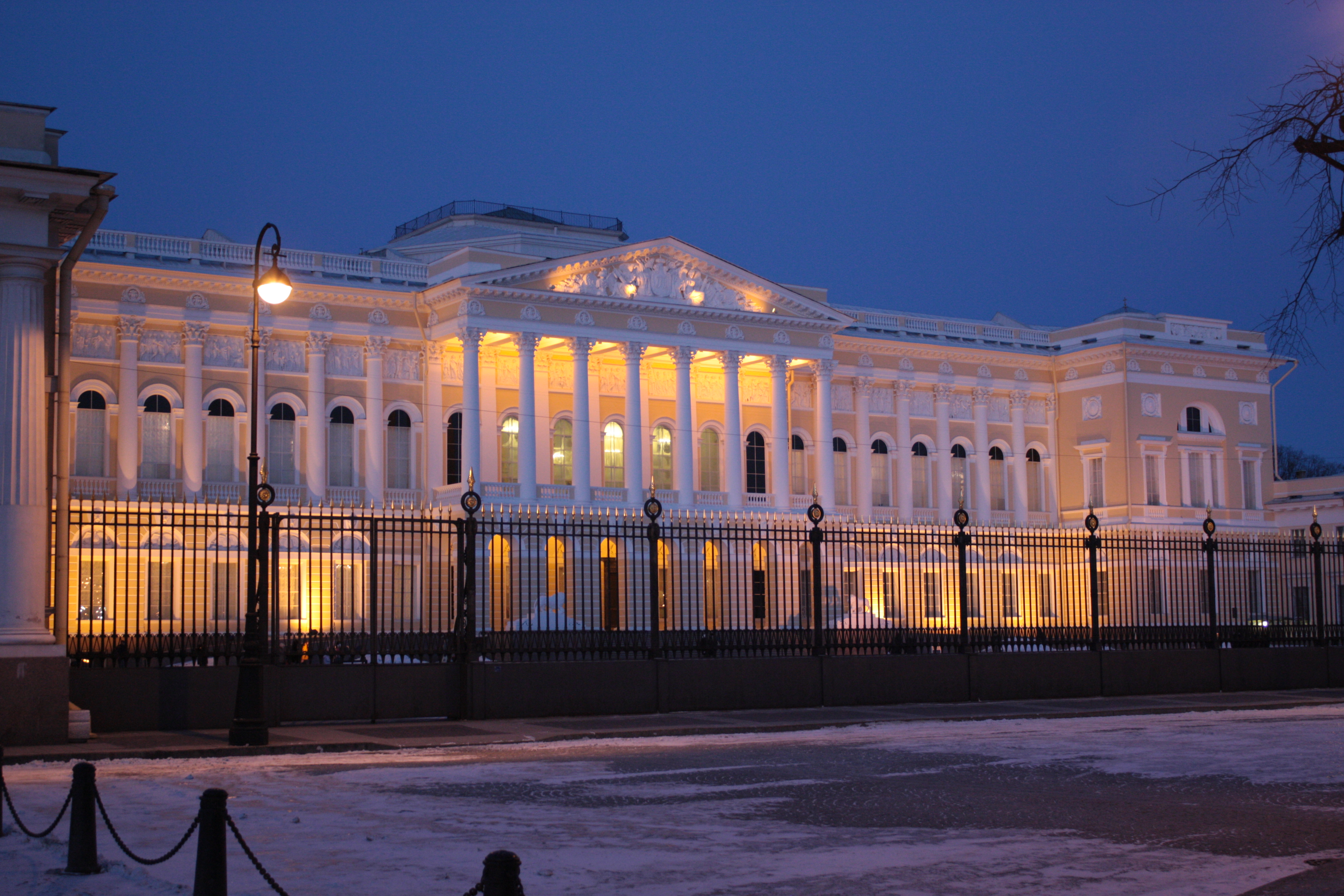
State Russian Museum

For the Exhibition were selected art works created in years of 1949–1950, also some earlier works. All they were exhibited in the first time. Some of them were subsequently found in the collections of leading Soviet Art museums, as well as domestic and foreign galleries and collectors. In exposition were presented all genres of contemporary painting: portrait, historical and genre scenes, landscape and cityscape, still life.

Genre painting was presented of "Herd" by Evsey Moiseenko, "On the peaceful fields" by Andrei Mylnikov, "A Midday" by Mikhail Natarevich, "Harvesting" by Sergei Osipov, "Preparation for the wedding" by Stepan Privedentsev, "Gas pipeline laying" by Gleb Savinov, "Girlfriends" by Alexander Samokhvalov, and some others.

Historical painting was presented of "Intelligence" by Mikhail Avilov, "Young Guard", "Speech by Lenin at the Finland Station" by Nikolai Babasuk, "Stalingrad of February 2, 1943" by Rudolf Frentz, "For the power of Soviets" by Evsey Moiseenko, "Lenin and Stalin in Razliv" by Yaroslav Nikolaev, "A Letter from Lenin" by Genrikh Pavlovsky, "Lenin and Stalin are discussing a plan for an armed uprising" by Joseph Serebriany, and some others.

Portrait was presented of "Brothers Ulyanov", "A Girl" by Olga Bogaevskaya, "Portrait of artist N. Tolstaya" by Vladimir Gorb, "Portrait of Baletin, known serviceman", "Portrait of Sokolov, advanced worker of Factory named Voskov", "Portrait of Vlasov, advanced worker and MP", "Portrait of M. Petrova, advanced worker of Factory named Voskov" by Felix Lembersky, "Portrait of poet Mikhail Dudin" by Andrei Mylnikov, "Portrait of Kim Il Sung" by Varlen Pen, "A Girl" by Yuri Tulin, "Portrait of Academician M. Khlopin" by Ruben Zakharian, and some others.

Landscape, Seascape and Cityscape were presented of "Arable land" by Vsevolod Bazhenov, "A Surf" by Lev Bogomolets, "On the Neva River embankment" by Rakhil Kogan, "Gurzuf" by Evsey Moiseenko, "Harvesting" by Nikolai Timkov, "Palace Square" by Vasily Vikulov, "Mountain landscape. Tianshan" by Rostislav Vovkushevsky, "A Road" by Vecheslav Zagonek, "Shelon River" by Sergei Zakharov, "In the Field", "A Sea" by Elena Zhukova, and some others.

Still life paintings were presented of "Phloxes" by Nina Ivanova, "Still life" by Yaroslav Nikolaev, "Still life" by Anastasiya Ukhanova, and some others.

== Acknowledgment ==
Exhibition was widely covered in press and in literature on Soviet fine art.

== See also ==
- Fine Art of Leningrad
- Leningrad School of Painting
- 1950 in fine arts of the Soviet Union
- Saint Petersburg Union of Artists
- Socialist realism

== Sources ==
- Выставка произведений ленинградских художников 1950 года. Каталог. М.-Л., Искусство, 1951.
- Выставки советского изобразительного искусства. Справочник. Т.4. 1948–1953 годы. М., Советский художник, 1976.
- Справочник членов Ленинградской организации Союза художников РСФСР. Л., Художник РСФСР, 1980.
- Художники народов СССР. Биографический словарь. Т.1-4. М., Искусство, 1970–1995.
- Справочник членов Союза художников СССР. Том 1,2. М., Советский художник, 1979.
- Sergei V. Ivanov. Unknown Socialist Realism. The Leningrad School. Saint Petersburg: NP-Print Edition, 2007. P.388. ISBN 5-901724-21-6, ISBN 978-5-901724-21-7
- Юбилейный Справочник выпускников Санкт-Петербургского академического института живописи, скульптуры и архитектуры имени И. Е. Репина Российской Академии художеств. 1915–2005. Санкт-Петербург, «Первоцвет», 2007.
