= Fine Arts of Leningrad (Exhibition, 1976) =

1976 Soviet arts exhibition in Moscow, Russia

Fine Arts of Leningrad. Moscow, 1976. Catalog
- Year: 1976
- Location: Manege; Moscow

The Fine Arts of Leningrad retrospective exhibition (Russian: Выставка "Изобразительное искусство Ленинграда" 1976 года) became the largest showing of Leningrad artists in the Soviet History outside the city, as well as in total one of the most important art exhibitions in USSR of the 1970s. The exhibition took place in the Moscow Manezh.

== History and organization ==
The retrospective exhibition Fine Arts of Leningrad was opened in Moscow at the end of 1976. The organization and preparation of the exhibition carried out by a specially formed exhibition committee, which consisted of 44 the most authoritative art experts under head of Boris Ugarov. It published a catalog of the exhibition. The exhibition displayed works of art by painters, sculptors, graphics, masters of arts and crafts, and artists of theater and cinema covering a span of over 40 years. The artworks were presented from the important Soviet art museums, including the State Russian Museum and the Tretyakov gallery.

== Contributing artists ==
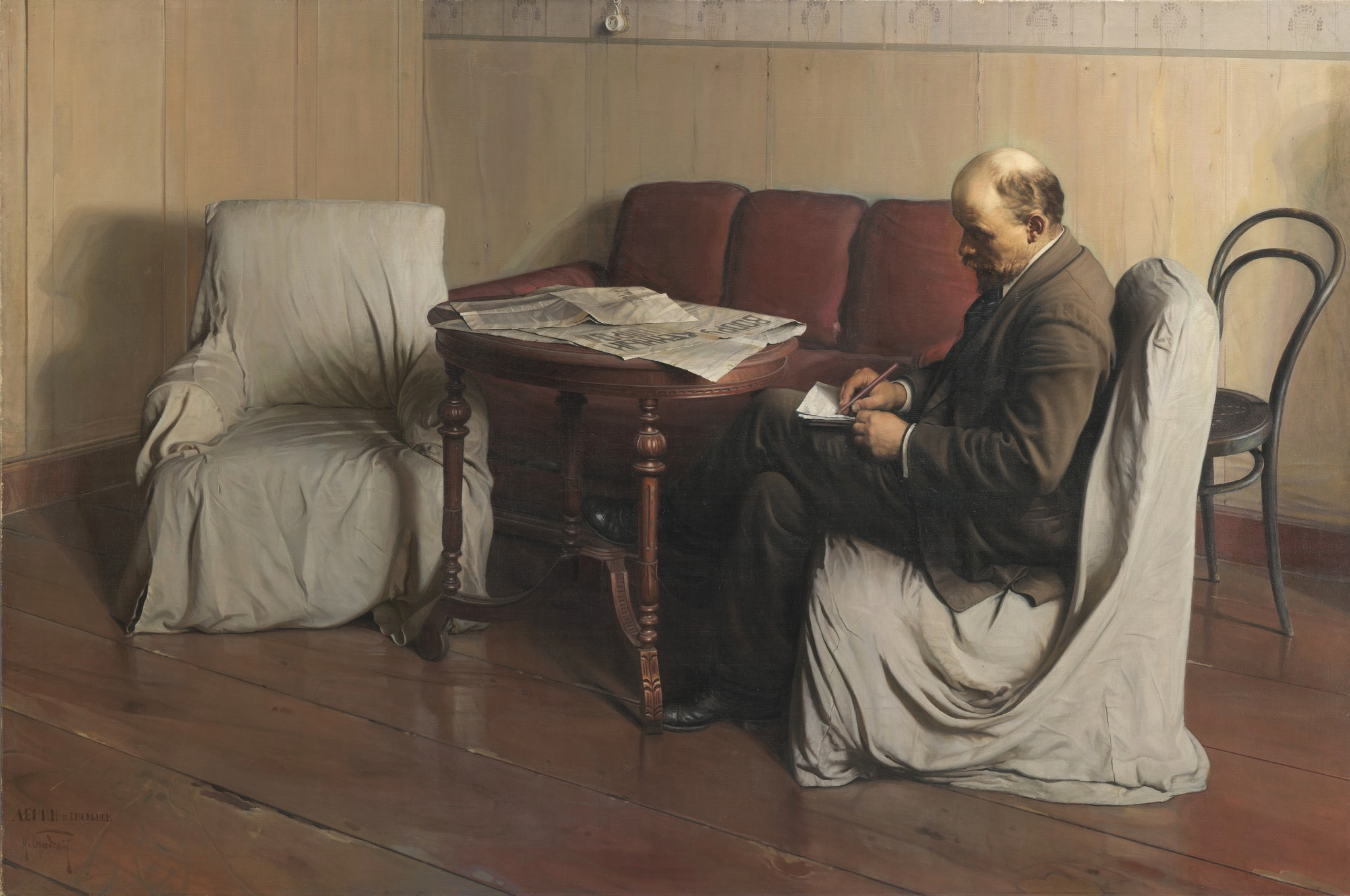
Isaak Brodsky, Lenin in Smolny, 1930

In the largest Department of Painting were exhibited art works of 226 authors. There were Mikhail Avilov, Evgenia Antipova, Nathan Altman, Irina Baldina, Nikolai Baskakov, Yuri Belov, Piotr Belousov, Dmitry Belyaev, Mikhail Bobyshov, Olga Bogaevskaya, Lev Bogomolets, Nikolai Brandt, Isaak Brodsky, Dmitry Buchkin, Piotr Buchkin, Lev Chegorovsky, Rudolf Frentz, Nikolai Galakhov, Vasily Golubev, Abram Grushko, Oleg Eremeev, Alexei Eriomin, Mikhail Kaneev, Engels Kozlov, Marina Kozlovskaya, Maya Kopitseva, Boris Korneev, Victor Korovin, Elena Kostenko, Nikolai Kostrov, Anna Kostrova, Gevork Kotiantz, Boris Kustodiev, Boris Lavrenko, Oleg Lomakin, Alexander Lubimov, Dmitry Maevsky, Vladimir Malevsky, Gavriil Malish, Boris Maluev, Yuri Mezhirov, Evsey Moiseenko, Andrei Mylnikov, Mikhail Natarevich, Vera Nazina, Yuri Neprintsev, Samuil Nevelshtein, Dmitry Oboznenko, Victor Oreshnikov, Sergei Osipov, Lia Ostrova, Vladimir Ovchinnikov, Alexei Pakhomov, Yuri Pavlov, Genrikh Pavlovsky, Varlen Pen, Kuzma Petrov-Vodkin, Nikolai Pozdneev, Stepan Privedentsev, Alexander Pushnin, Valentina Rakhina, Semion Rotnitsky, Ivan Savenko, Vladimir Sakson, Gleb Savinov, Alexander Samokhvalov, Vladimir Seleznev, Alexander Semionov, Arseny Semionov, Joseph Serebriany, Boris Shamanov, Nadezhda Shteinmiller, Elena Skuin, Galina Smirnova, Alexander Sokolov, Victor Teterin, Nikolai Timkov, Mikhail Trufanov, Yuri Tulin, Boris Ugarov, Ivan Varichev, Anatoli Vasiliev, Valery Vatenin, Nina Veselova, German Yegoshin, Vecheslav Zagonek, Sergei Zakharov, Alexander Zaytsev, Elena Zhukova, and other important Leningrad artists.

In the Department of Sculptures were exhibited art works of 133 sculptors. The Department of Graphics presented a creation of 163 artists.

== Contributed artworks ==
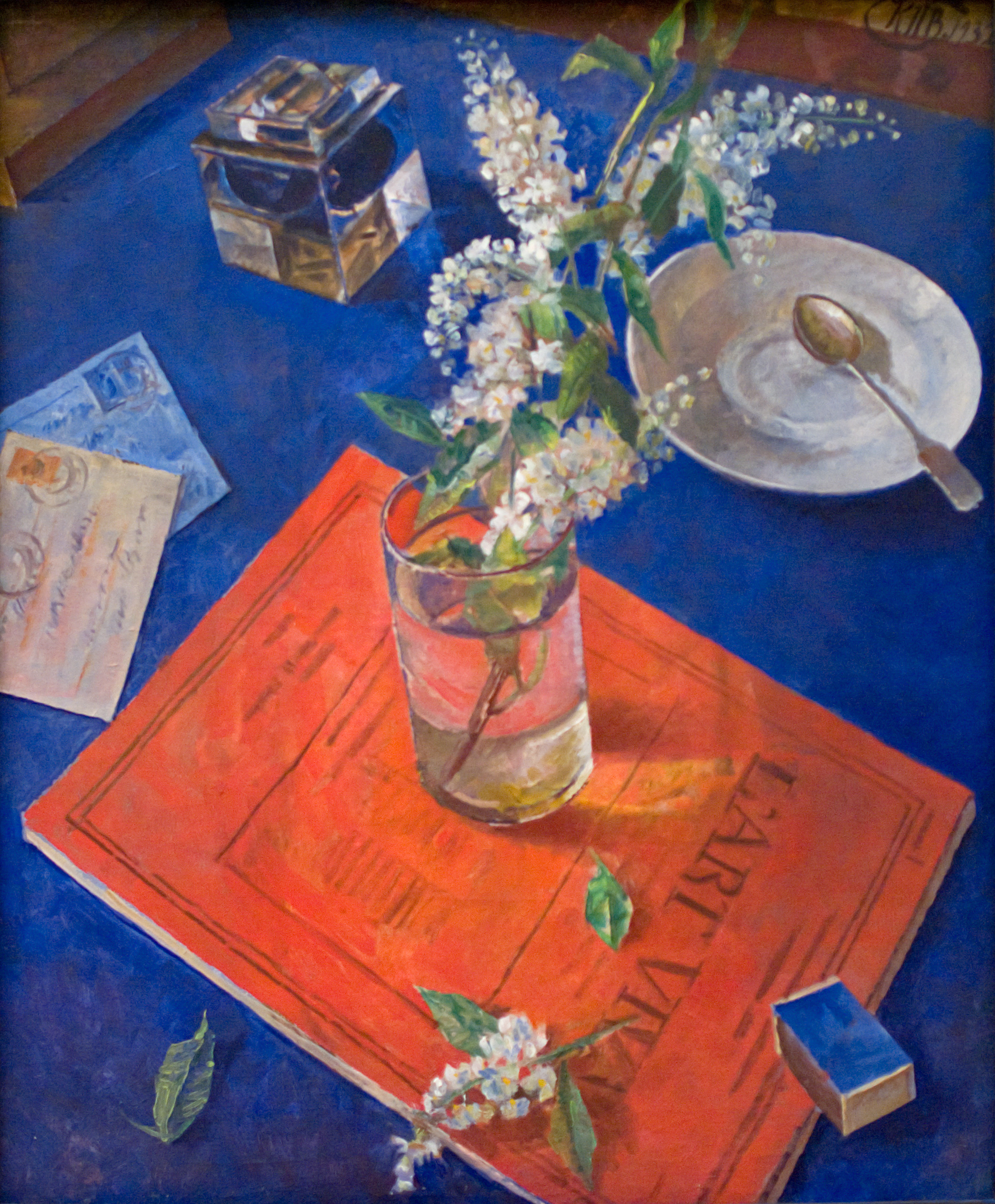
Kuzma Petrov-Vodkin, Bird Cherry in Glass, 1932

For the exhibition were selected best art works created for over 40 years, from the first post revolution decade up to today. Many of them had a rich exhibit history and were presented from collections of leading Art museums.

Historical genre was presented of "Duel on the Kulikovo Field" (Russian Museum) by Mikhail Avilov, "Workers of War" by Nikolay Babasjuk, "In the Years of War" by Nikolai Baskakov, "Lenin among delegates III Congress of the Komsomol" by Piotr Belousov, "Lenin in Smolny", "Demonstration" (Russian Museum) by Isaak Brodsky, "Was left alone" by Dmitry Buchkin, "Lenin with workers" by Lev Chegorovsky, "To Lenin" by Alexey Eremin, "Ice Track. Ladoga Lake. April 23, 1942" by Boris Korneev, "Stepan Razin", "Celebration of the Opening 2nd Congress of Comintern on the Uritsky Squear on June 19, 1920" (Russian Museum) by Boris Kustodiev, "Roads of War", "Ancient Russia" by Boris Lavrenko, "Leningrad in the Struggle" by Oleg Lomakin, "The Year of 1905" Vladimir Malevsky, "Donbass in the first day of war" (Russian Museum), "Petrograd in 1917" by Boris Maluev, "We'll not Forget", "Patrol" by Mikhail Natarevich, "Partisan" by Samuil Nevelshtein,"Rest after the Buttle"(Tretyakov Gallery), "Sun again", "Bread. The Year of 1941", "Tram is going to the Front", "Sailor of the Baltic Fleet" by Yuri Neprintsev, "To the Big Ground" (Russian Museum) by Yaroslav Nikolaev, "Summer of 1941" by Dmitry Oboznenko, "Lenin on Exam in Leningrad University" by Victor Oreshnikov, "Trench Pravda" by Yuriy Pimenov, "Near Academia of Science", "At Home", "For the Water", "Winter Groove" by Mikhail Platunov, "Partisans of the Lesgaft Institute after combat operation", "In the Leningrad Philharmonic. 1942 Year" (both Russian Museum) by Joseph Serebriany, "Peasant Petitioners to Lenin", "Winter Palace is Detailed" by Vladimir Serov, "On the Mine", "October", "Leningrad Citizen. In 1941 year", "October" by Boris Ugarov, and some others.

Portrait was presented of Natasha, "Girls" by Irina Baldina, "Portrait of A. F. Vinokurova" by Andrei Bantikov, "Lenin in Gorki" by Nikolai Baskakov, "A Son" by Dmitry Belyaev, "Brother and Sister Ulyanov's" by Olga Bogaevskaya, "Portrait of a People's Artist of the USSR Andreev" by Piotr Buchkin, "Portrait of daughter" by Oleg Eremeev, "Portrait of the Shepherd V. Baykov" by Boris Korneev, "Portrait of Doctor of Philology V. I. Malyshev" by Engels Kozlov, "Portrait of Fedor Chaliapin" (Russian Museum) by Boris Kustodiev, "In the Way", "Portrait of Architect V. M. Maslov" by Boris Lavrenko, "Portrait of Dancer N. S. Nadezhdina", "Portrait of Artist T. V. Shishmareva" (both Russian Museum) by Vladimir Lebedev (painter), "Portrait of Machine Operator P. E. Smirnov", "Private of October" by Anatoli Levitin, "Portrait of Builder A. Fedotova" by Oleg Lomakin, "Portrait of Artist Mikhail Avilov" (Russian Museum) by Alexander Lubimov, "Zoya – Komsomol Member of Dzerzhinsky Sovkhoz" by Dmitry Maevsky, "Portrait of A. V. Tsyganova", Portrait of V. N. Nekrasov – Old Member of Lenin's Кolkhoz" by Vladimir Malagis, "Partisan-girl" by Boris Maluev, "Femail Portrait" by Evsey Moiseenko, "Sculptor" by Mikhail Natarevich, "Girl-Partisan" by Samuil Nevelshtein, "Selfportrait" Russian Museum) by Yaroslav Nikolaev, "Portrait of Boris Piotrovsky", "Portrait of Ballerina A. Y. Shelest", "Portrait of Wife" (all Russian Museum) by Victor Oreshnikov, "Portrait of Artist L. V. Pticyn", "Portrait of poet Alexander Block" Yuri Pavlov (painter), "Worker", "Boy", "Reaper" (all Russian Museum) by Alexei Pakhomov, "Portrait of People's Artist A. F. Pakhomov" by Pen Varlen, "Selfportrait", "Girl near the Window" by Kuzma Petrov-Vodkin, "Portrait of artist Lapuskin", "Portrait of Old Bolshevik Emelyanov" by Semion Rotnitsky, "Girl in a Shirt", "Girl Builder of Metro" (both Russian Museum) by Alexander Samokhvalov, "Portrait of composer Dmitri Shostakovich", "Sviatoslav Richter (Tretyakov Gallery)" by Joseph Serebriany, "Portrait of Lenin" by Vladimir Serov, "Young Pioneer Leader" by Galina Smirnova, "Miner", "Metallurgists" by Mikhail Trufanov, "Portrait of composer Andrey Petrov" by Boris Ugarov, "Leningrad Oncologists" by Anatoli Vasiliev, "Portrait of an Artist B. I. Kalmanov", "Sergei Esenin with Mother" by Igor Veselkin, "Portrait of Mikhail Dolgov, director of Kolkhoz" (Russian Museum) by Nina Veselova, and some others.

Genre painting was represented of "In the Country", "Guests" by Olga Bogaevskaya, "On the Balcony" (Russian Museum) by Isaak Brodsky, "Barentsevo Sea" by Lev Bogomolets, "Onega Fish Soup", "Mothers Thought" (Russian Museum) by Alexey Eremin, "Cabby scorcher" (Russian Museum) by Rudolf Frentz, "Thoughts", "About the coming day" by Leonid Kabachek, "Black Gold", "To the Miners" by Engels Kozlov, "Developing of the North", "Gold of the Polar Region" by Boris Korneev, "Warm Day"(Russian Museum), "In Defence of Revolution" by Anatoli Levitin, "Repetition" by Oleg Lomakin, "Mothers, Sisters" (Russian Museum), "Messengers" (Tretyakov Gallery), "Cherry" by Evsey Moiseenko, "Sons" by Yuri Mezhirov, "Sisters", "Waking up" (both Russian Museum) by Andrei Mylnikov, "To the Theatre" by Vera Nazina, "Lesson of History" by Samuil Nevelshtein, "Fantasia. Rider of the Red Horse", "Alarm" by Kuzma Petrov-Vodkin, "Weaving Workshop", "Military Komsomol" (both Russian Museum) by Alexander Samokhvalov, "In the Hermitage", "Shop Window" by Vladimir Sakson, "Lacemakers" by Elena Skuin, "Spring in Ostrov Village", "Ice Drifting", "Silver Cities", "Daybreak" by Vitaly Tulenev, "Weekend in Central Park of Culture and Recreation" by German Yegoshin, "Bird-cherry is Blooming" (Russian Museum) by Vecheslav Zagonek, "Toilers of the Sea" by Alexander Zaytsev, and some others.

Landscape and Cityscape was represented of "On the Oka River" by Dmitry Belyaev, "At the Bronze Horseman", "Flooding on the Channel" by Mikhail Bobyshov, "Storm" by Lev Bogomolets, "A Winter" (Russian Museum) by Isaak Brodsky, "Krukov Canal" (Russian Museum) by Rudolf Frentz, "Timber Processing Complex in Umah, Karelia", "Northern Place" by Nikolay Galakhov, "Evening Boating on the Motor Ship" by Ivan Godlevsky, "It Rains" by Leonid Kabachek, "On the Former Sennaya Square in Leningrad", "Narva Gates", "Bridge of Builders" by Mikhail Kaneev, "Andreevsky Market", "Neva River" (both Russian Museum) by Alexei Karev, "Autumn Bird-cherry Tree", "It's Raining" by Maya Kopitseva, "Evening in Petrokrepost", "Autumn on Moika River" by Victor Korovin, "Altai", "Murmansk Port" by Marina Kozlovskaya, "A White Night", "Construction Site", "Watchmakers" by Yaroslav Krestovsky, "Donbass" by Gavriil Malish, "Morning", "A Spring" by Andrei Mylnikov, "Venice", "White Nights" (both Russian Museum) by Yaroslav Nikolaev, "Forest Wakes-up", "Willow is Blooming" by Dmitry Oboznenko, "Evening in the Country", "Morjana. Caspian Sea" by Vladimir Ovchinnikov, "Haymaking time", "Blue Winter", "Pskov Site" by Sergei Osipov, "Native open spaces", "Lilac Silvery. On footbridge" by Lia Ostrova, "Hermitage. Jordan Staircase", "Demidov Lane", "Winter (Moyka River)" (all Russian Museum), "St Isaac's Square" by Vecheslav Pakulin, "In the Taiga Site", "A Path along the River", "Stone-Flower" by Vsevolod Petrov-Maslakov, "Northern Market", "Summer" by Nikolai Pozdneev, "Spring in Leningrad" by Stepan Privedentsev, "Leningrad" by Alexander Semionov, "Torzhok", "View of Suzdal" by Arseny Semionov, "A Spring" by Kim Slavin, "Street of the Childhood", "Big Rains", "Daybreak. From the Night Watch" by Vitaly Tulenev, "The Beginning of April", "Blue Water", "A Windy" by Piotr Fomin, "Sea and Children", "Saturday Evening on Onega" by Valery Vatenin, "Sudak. Genoese fortress" by German Yegoshin, "Thunderstorm has passed", "Morning" (both Russian Museum), "Baltika" by Vecheslav Zagonek, "A Spring", "On the Neva River" (Russian Museum) by Alexander Zaytsev, "Spring near Leningrad. Snowdrops" by Elena Zhukova, and some others.

Still life paintings was represented by "Chromatic Volumes Planes" (Russian Museum) by Natan Altman, "Painting of Porcelain" by Zaven Arshakuni, "South Still Life" by Evgenia Antipova, "Still Life with a Tray" by Olga Bogaevskaya, "Still-life with Flower and Drapery", "Still-life with Log" by Alexey Karev, "Work Table", "Still-life with Persimmon" by Maya Kopitseva, "Winter Morning" by Elena Kostenko, "Still-life", "Green Still-life" by Gevork Kotiantz, "Guitar with Porcelain Cat", "Guitar, Jug and Apples", "Paper Flowers and Shell" (all Russian Museum) by Vladimir Lebedev, "Still-life. Pears" by Gavriil Malish, "Guitars" by Evsey Moiseenko, Still-life by Andrei Mylnikov, Still-life with Balalaika by Sergei Osipov, "Bird Cherry in a glass", "Herring" (both Russian Museum) by Kuzma Petrov-Vodkin, "Jugs on the Red table-cloth", "At the Window" by Valentina Rakhina, "Night Still-life" by Vladimir Sakson, "Still life with antic sculpture" by Arseny Semionov, "Red Carnations" by Kim Slavin, "The Beginning of the Spring", "A March" "Before the Rain" by Ivan Varichev, "Bouquet" by German Yegoshin, "Still-life", "Irises" by Sergei Zakharov, and some others.

== Acknowledgment ==
The retrospective exhibition Fine Arts of Leningrad was widely covered in press and in literature specialized at Soviet fine art.

== Gallery ==
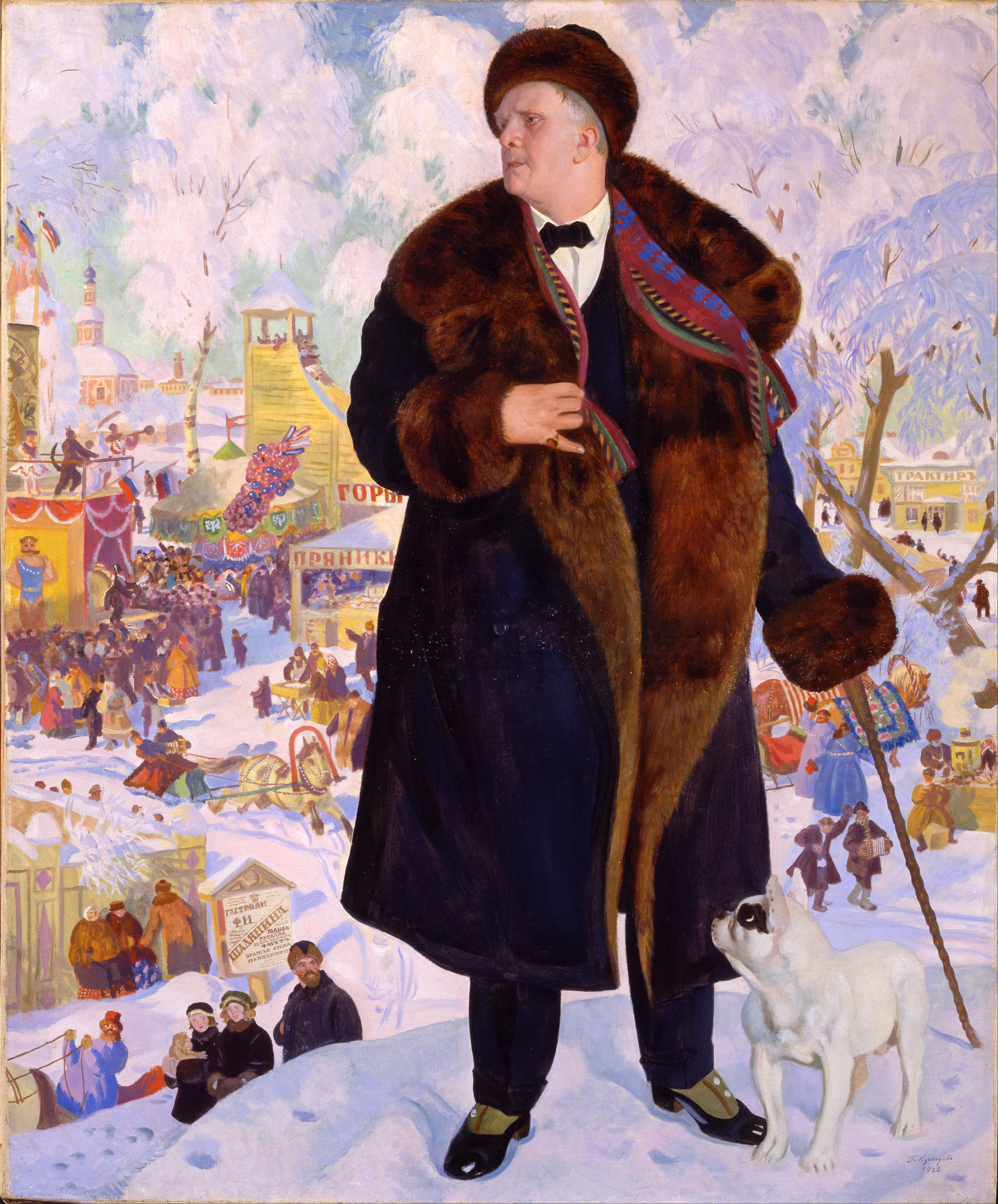
Boris Kustodiev, Feodor Chaliapin, 1921

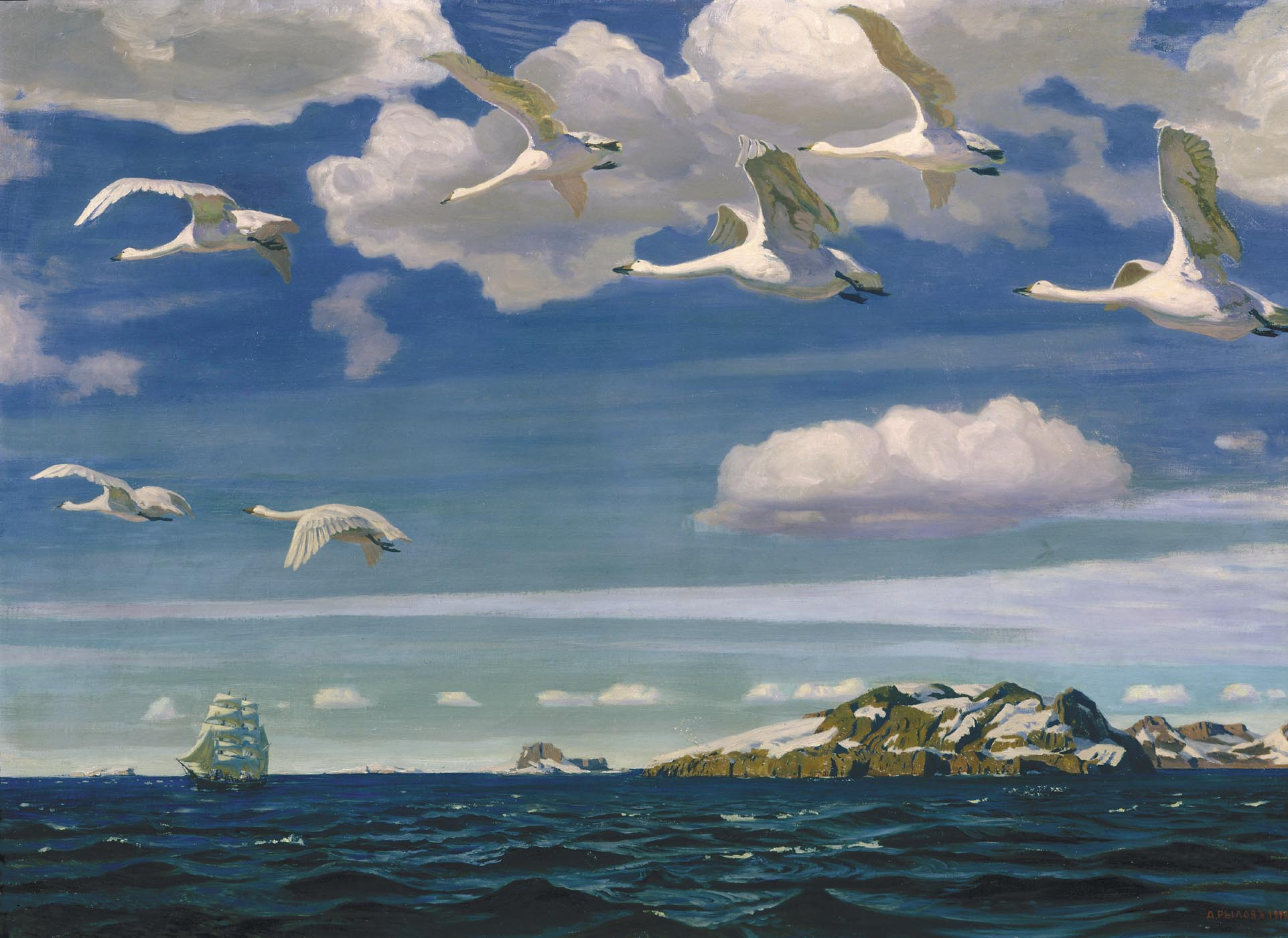
Arkady Rylov
In the Blue expanse. 1918

== See also ==
- Fine Art of Leningrad
- Soviet art
- 1976 in fine arts of the Soviet Union
- Leningrad School of Painting
- Saint Petersburg Union of Artists
- Socialist realism

== Sources ==
- Угаров Б. Нет преград для расцвета талантов // Ленинградская правда, 1977, 18 августа.
- Изобразительное искусство Ленинграда. Каталог выставки. Л., Художник РСФСР, 1976.
- Обольсина О. Гражданственность искусства. О выставке работ ленинградских художников // Искусство. 1977, № 5. С.15-25.
- Справочник членов Ленинградской организации Союза художников РСФСР. Л., Художник РСФСР, 1980.
- Художники народов СССР. Биобиблиографический словарь. Т.1-4. М., Искусство, 1970-1995.
- Справочник членов Союза художников СССР. Том 1,2. М., Советский художник, 1979.
- Ганеева В., Гусев В., Цветова А. Изобразительное искусство Ленинграда. Выставка произведений ленинградских художников. Москва. Ноябрь 1976 – январь 1977. Л., Художник РСФСР, 1981. 480 С.
- Степанов Г. Актуальные проблемы развития монументального искусства Ленинграда // Материалы конференции, проведенной на основе выставки «Изобразительное искусство Ленинграда». Л., Художник РСФСР, 1981. С.437-441.
- Мочалов Л. Некоторые проблемы развития ленинградского искусства // Материалы конференции, проведенной на основе выставки «Изобразительное искусство Ленинграда». Л., Художник РСФСР, 1981. С.415-422.
- Яковлева Л. Ленинградская живопись. история и современность // Материалы конференции, проведенной на основе выставки «Изобразительное искусство Ленинграда». Л., Художник РСФСР, 1981. С.427-431.
- Павлова Н. Ленинградские художники театра и кино на выставке «Изобразительное искусство Ленинграда» // Материалы конференции, проведенной на основе выставки «Изобразительное искусство Ленинграда». Л., Художник РСФСР, 1981. С.441-446.
- Time for Change: The Art of 1960–1985 in the Soviet Union. Saint Petersburg, State Russian Museum, 2006. P.378.
- Юбилейный Справочник выпускников Санкт-Петербургского академического института живописи, скульптуры и архитектуры имени И. Е. Репина Российской Академии художеств. 1915—2005. СПб.,«Первоцвет», 2007.
