= Autumn exhibition =

Autumn exhibition may refer to:

- Autumn exhibition (Leningrad, 1956)
- Autumn exhibition (Leningrad, 1958)
- Autumn exhibition (Leningrad, 1962)
- Autumn exhibition (Leningrad, 1968)
- Autumn Exhibition (Leningrad, 1978)
