= In the Sun (Alexander Samokhvalov) =

1953 painting by Alexander Nikolayevich Samokhvalov

- Artist: Alexander N. Samokhvalov
- Year: 1953
- Medium: Oil on canvas
- Dimensions: 40 cm × 31 cm (16 in × 12 in)
- Location: private collection; Moscow

In the Sun (Russian: На солнце) is a painting by Alexander Samokhvalov (Russian: Алекса́ндр Никола́евич Самохва́лов, 1894–1971), depicting his wife, the artist Maria Alexseevna Kleshchar-Samokhvalova (Russian: Мария Алексеевна Клещар-Самохвалова; 1915–2000).

== History ==
Alexander Samokhvalov (1894-1971)

Alexander Samokhvalov was a well-known Russian painter, watercolorist, graphic artist, illustrator, and art teacher. He was an Honored Arts Worker of the RSFSR, who lived and worked in Leningrad, and was regarded as one of the founders and brightest representatives of the Socialist realism art movement.

The portrait In the Sun was painted in Gurzuf, Crimea, where between 1950 and 1960 Samokhvalov repeatedly vacationed with his wife Maria Alekseyevna Kleshchar-Samokhvalova. She was born in Ukraine near Poltava. At age seven, she was orphaned. After World War II, Mary moved to Leningrad, where she met Samokhvalov; they married in 1950. For more than 20 years of marriage, she posed for many paintings as well as oil portraits and drawings. In particular she served as a model for the central female figure of the picture Cafe Gurzuf (a young woman at a table in a pink blouse, apparently studying the menu).

After her husband died, she took an active part in the preservation of his artistic legacy, as well as the publication of his literary heritage and organizing commemorative exhibitions of his works. Between 1994 and 1996, the portrait was shown in the Nikolay Nekrasov Memorial museum, first at the exhibition Etudes from the life, then at the exhibition Paintings of 1940–1990. The Leningrad School. In 2007 In the Sun was reproduced and described among 350 art works from Leningrad artists in the book Unknown Socialist Realism: The Leningrad School, published in Russian and English.

In 2019 the painting was reproduced in the book The Leningrad School of Painting: Essays on the History published in Russian and English.

== See also ==
- Artist Alexander Nikolayevich Samokhvalov (1894–1971)
- Café Gurzuf painting

== Bibliography ==
- Irina Barshova, Kira Sazonova. Alexander Samokhvalov. Leningrad, Khudozhnik RSFSR, 1963.
- Справочник членов Ленинградской организации Союза художников РСФСР. Л., Художник РСФСР, 1987. С.57.
- Ленинградские художники. Живопись 1950–1980 годов. Каталог. СПб., Выставочный центр ПСХ, 1994. С.4.
- Etudes done from nature by the Leningrad School's artists. Exhibition catalogue. Saint Petersburg, Nikolai Nekrasov Memorial museum, 1994. P.6.
- Живопись 1940–1990 годов. Ленинградская школа. Выставка произведений. СПб., 1996. С.4.
- Самохвалов Александр Николаевич. В годы беспокойного солнца. СПб., Всемирное слово, 1996.
- Sergei Ivanov. Unknown socialist realism. The Leningrad school. Saint-Petersburg, NP—Print, 2007. P.147.
