= Portrait of Contemporary (Leningrad, 1976) =

1976 Soviet art exhibition

Portrait of Contemporary. The Fifth Exhibition of Leningrad artists of 1976. Catalog
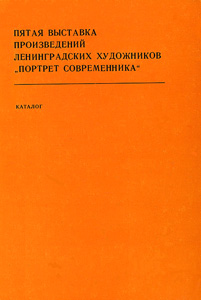
- Year: 1972
- Location: State Russian Museum; Leningrad

"Portrait of Contemporary" The Fifth Exhibition of Leningrad artists of 1976 (Russian: Портрет современника. Пятая выставка произведений ленинградских художников 1976 года) became one of the notable events in Art of the USSR of 1976. The exhibition took place in the State Russian Museum. Exhibition continued a series of art exhibitions of the 1970s, dedicated to image of our contemporary and opened in 1971.

== History and organization ==
Exhibition was opened in spring of 1976. Organization and preparation of Exhibition engaged specially formed Exhibition Committee which consisted of 26 the authoritative art-experts. It was published a Catalog of the exhibition. Exhibition displayed works of art of leading Leningrad painters, sculptors, and graphics artists.

== Contributing artists ==
In the largest Department of Painting were exhibited art works of 128 authors. There were Taisia Afonina, Nikolai Baskakov, Nikolai Galakhov, Tatiana Gorb, Alexei Eriomin, Mikhail Kaneev, Boris Korneev, Elena Kostenko, Anna Kostrova, Engels Kozlov, Marina Kozlovskaya, Mikhail Kozell, Valeria Larina, Boris Lavrenko, Oleg Lomakin, Dmitry Maevsky, Yuri Mezhirov, Mikhail Natarevich, Vera Nazina, Samuil Nevelshtein, Lev Orekhov, Victor Oreshnikov, Vladimir Ovchinnikov, Pen Varlen, Semion Rotnitsky, Vladimir Seleznev, Arseny Semionov, Alexander Semionov, Boris Shamanov, Alexander Stolbov, Alexander Tatarenko, Yuri Tulin, Vitaly Tulenev, Alexander Shmidt, Igor Veselkin, Ruben Zakharian, Maria Zubreeva, and others most prominent painters of the Leningrad School.

In the Department of Sculptures were exhibited art works of 106 sculptors. Department of graphics presented a creation of 81 artists.

== Contributed artworks ==
For the Exhibition were selected art works created in 1975–1976, also some earlier works. All they were exhibited in the first time. Some of them were subsequently found in the collections of leading Soviet Art museums, as well as domestic and foreign galleries and collectors.

Portrait of workers of Science and Culture was presented of "Portrait entomologist S. Keleynikova" by Taisia Afonina, "Portrait of actress Olga Volkova" by Dmitry Belyaev, "Architect A. Vasiliev" by Nikolai Galakhov, "Portrait of Academician V. Sochava" by Elena Kostenko, "Self-Portrait" by Marina Kozlovskaya, "Portrait of Art Critic Miamlyn" by Boris Lavrenko, "Portrait od sculptor Kerzin" by Victor Oreshnikov, "Portrait of sculptor Stamov" by Pen Varlen, "Artist Nikolai Timkov" by Vladimir Tokarev, and some others.

Portrait of a working man was presented of "Kolkhoz watchman Mitrich" by Nikolai Baskakov, "Master Timofey Gerasymovich from Zaonezhje", "Tractor driver Baykov with her son Alexei" by Alexei Eriomin, "A. Chuev, turner of Baltiysky Shipyard" by Alexandra Ivanova, and some others.

Female and Child portrait was presented of "Girl on a pink background", "Portrait of cosmetologist A. Sakeranskaya" by Boris Korneev, "Portrait of Lena Molteninova" by Elena Kostenko, "Portrait of Sportswoman" by Valeria Larina, "Portrait of Tania Sherbakova" by Semion Rotnitsky, "Portrait of Mother" by Igor Veselkin, and some others.

== Acknowledgment ==
Exhibition was widely covered in press and in literature on Soviet fine art.

== See also ==
- Fine Art of Leningrad
- 1976 in fine arts of the Soviet Union
- Leningrad School of Painting
- Saint Petersburg Union of Artists
- Socialist realism

== Sources ==
- Портрет современника. Пятая выставка произведений ленинградских художников. Каталог. Л., Художник РСФСР, 1983.
- Справочник членов Ленинградской организации Союза художников РСФСР. Л., Художник РСФСР, 1980.
- Художники народов СССР. Биографический словарь. Т.1-4. М., Искусство, 1970–1995.
- Справочник членов Союза художников СССР. Том 1,2. М., Советский художник, 1979.
- Время перемен. Искусство 1960—1985 в Советском Союзе. СПб., Государственный Русский музей, 2006. C.380.
- Sergei V. Ivanov. Unknown Socialist Realism. The Leningrad School. Saint Petersburg: NP-Print Edition, 2007. P.392. ISBN 5-901724-21-6, ISBN 978-5-901724-21-7
- Юбилейный Справочник выпускников Санкт-Петербургского академического института живописи, скульптуры и архитектуры имени И. Е. Репина Российской Академии художеств. 1915–2005. Санкт-Петербург, «Первоцвет», 2007.
