= Cafe Gurzuf =

1956 painting by Alexander Nikolayevich Samokhvalov

- Artist: Alexander N. Samokhvalov
- Year: 1956
- Type: Oil on board
- Dimensions: 50 cm × 53 cm (20 in × 21 in)
- Location: private collection; Moscow

Cafe Gurzuf (Russian: Кафе Гурзуф) is a painting by Alexander Nikolayevich Samokhvalov (Russian: Алекса́ндр Никола́евич Самохва́лов; 1894–1971), Russian artist, regarded as one of the founders and brightest representative of the Socialist Realism style. The painting depicts a view of a summer cafe in Gurzuf, Crimea, in the middle of the 1950s.

== History ==
Alexander Samokhvalov

Samokhvalov is known in Soviet art for his portraits of typical young Soviet people of the 1930s ("Girl in a T-shirt", 1932, "Metrostroevka with a drill", 1937) as well as a monumental compositions ("Militarized Komsomol", 1933; "Sergei Kirov takes parade athletes", 1935; the monumental panel "Soviet Sport", 1936). They embodied the typical image of contemporary youth. The picture Cafe Gurzuf continues this theme.

Samokhvalov painted the present work in the mid-1950s at the zenith of his career. Not long beforehand, he had married his young wife Maria Alekseevna Kleschar (1915–2000), who became his muse and faithful assistant. Captivated by her beauty and youthfulness, Samokhvalov found her to be a source of true inspiration. The present work conveys the artist’s fascination with beauty and youth, as depicted by the central seated figure, for which Samokhvalov’s wife served as a model for the central female figure (a young woman at a table in a pink blouse, studying a menu). The graceful inclination of her head and the curve of her shoulders evince her delicate beauty.

Samokhvalov, In the Sun, 1953

In addition to artistic value, the picture has memorial and documentary value. This picture was painted by the artist in one of his visits to Gurzuf, where from 1950 to 1960 he repeatedly rested with his wife on the creative base of Russian artists at the former summer residence of Konstantin Korovin. A model for another female figure of the first plan from the left in a yellow dress with a red bag over his arm going up the steps became Lydia Timoshenko (1903–1976), artist and a wife of Yevgeny Kibrik (1906–1978), People's artist of the USSR.

Portrayed on the left in a blue suit and straw hat is Samokhvalov’s friend, the artist Evgeny Kibrik, who in 1920s was a student of Pavel Filonov, as well as Samkhvalov himself, also in a straw hat and just visible over Kibrik’s shoulder.

Samokhvalov since the 1920s was familiar with Lydia Tymoshenko and Yevgeny Kibrik and maintained friendship with them. In the 1920s, together with Tymoshenko, he was a member of the Leningrad association "Circle of Artists" (Krug Khudozhnikov) (1926–1932). The first husband of Lydia Timoshenko was artist David Zagoskin (1900–1942), who from 1926 to 1930 was also a member of the "Circle of Artists".

The optimism and joy of the scene stem from the overall mood during the Thaw of the post-Stalinist period and is conveyed by Samokhvalov in the picture.

== Exhibitions and publications ==
Lydia Timoshenko. 1920s

Cafe Gurzuf was first exhibited in 1960 at the grand Annual Exhibition of works by the leningrad artists of 1960 in the Exhibition Halls of the Leningrad Union of Artists.

In 1963 Cafe Gurzuf was shown at the first solo exhibition of Samokhvalov in Leningrad in the Exhibition Halls of the Leningrad Union of Artists dedicated to the seventieth anniversary of the artist.

After Samokhvalov's death the painting was kept by his widow until the early 1990s when it was sold to a private collector.

In 1994, after a long break time Cafe Gurzuf was shown again in the Leningrad Union of Artists at the exhibition of The Paintings of 1950-1980s by the Leningrad School artists.

In 2012 the painting was exhibited in "Manezh" Central Exhibition Hall on The Art Fair devoted to 80th Anniversary of Saint-Petersburg Union of Artists. It was reproduced in the exhibition catalog.

In 2007 Cafe Gurzuf was published in the book Unknown Socialist Realism. The Leningrad School by Sergei V. Ivanov, in Russian and English.

The history of this painting was described in the article by S. Ivanov, dedicated to the wife of the artist and published in 2015 to her centenary anniversary.

== See also ==
- In the Sun painting

== Bibliography ==
- Выставка произведений ленинградских художников 1960 года. Каталог. Л., Художник РСФСР, 1963. C.16.
- Александр Николаевич Самохвалов. Выставка произведений. Каталог. Л., Художник РСФСР, 1963. C.20.
- Справочник членов Ленинградской организации Союза художников РСФСР. Л., Художник РСФСР, 1987. C.57.
- Ленинградские художники. Живопись 1950—1980 годов. Каталог. Санкт-Петербург, Выставочный центр ПСХ, 1994. C.4.
- Самохвалов Александр Николаевич. В годы беспокойного солнца. Санкт-Петербург, Всемирное слово, 1996.
- Alexander Samokhvalov. Cafe Gurzuf. 1956 / Sergei Ivanov. Unknown socialist realism. The Leningrad school. Saint-Petersburg, NP—Print, 2007. P.2-3, 342, 346, 351, 354, 369, 394, 416, 435, 442. ISBN 5-901724-21-6, ISBN 978-5-901724-21-7.
- Самохвалов А. Кафе Гурзуф. 1956. / 80 Лет Санкт-Петербургскому Союзу художников. Юбилейная выставка. СПб, 2012. С.210.
- Иванов С. В. Что движет солнце и светила. // Петербургские искусствоведческие тетради. Вып. 34. СПб, 2015. С.228-232.

== Links ==
- Sotheby's (2013)
- MacDougall's (2018)
