= Stepan Privedentsev =

Russian painter (1916 – 1990)

- Степан Приведенцев
- Born: 5 January 1916; Makeyevka, Russian Empire
- Died: 7 November 1990 (aged 74); Leningrad, Russian SFSR, Soviet Union
- Education: Repin Institute of Arts
- Known for: Painting
- Movement: Realism
- Awards: Order of the Red Star (twice); Order of the Patriotic War; Medal "For the Victory Over Germany"; Medal For the Capture of Berlin; Medal "For the Liberation of Warsaw"

Stepan Ivanovich Privedentsev (Russian: Степан Иванович Приведенцев; 5 January 1916 – 7 November 1990) was a Soviet Russian painter, a member of the Leningrad Union of Artists, who lived and worked in Leningrad, regarded as one of representatives of the Leningrad school of painting, most famous for his genre and landscape paintings.

== See also ==
- Leningrad School of Painting
- List of 20th-century Russian painters
- List of painters of Saint Petersburg Union of Artists
- Saint Petersburg Union of Artists

== Bibliography ==
- Выставка произведений ленинградских художников 1950 года. Каталог. М-Л., Искусство, 1951. C.19.
- Выставка произведений ленинградских художников 1951 года. Каталог. Л., Лениздат, 1951. С.17.
- 1917 — 1957. Выставка произведений ленинградских художников. Каталог. Л., Ленинградский художник, 1958. С.26.
- Осенняя выставка произведений ленинградских художников 1958 года. Каталог. Л., Художник РСФСР, 1959. С.22.
- Выставка произведений ленинградских художников 1960 года. Каталог. Л., Художник РСФСР, 1963. С.15.
- Выставка произведений ленинградских художников 1960 года. Каталог. Л., Художник РСФСР, 1961. С.33.
- Выставка произведений ленинградских художников 1961 года. Каталог. Л., Художник РСФСР, 1964. С.32.
- Осенняя выставка произведений ленинградских художников 1962 года. Каталог. Л., Художник РСФСР, 1962. С.22.
- Ленинград. Зональная выставка 1964 года. Каталог. Л, Художник РСФСР, 1965. C.43.
- Буткевич О. От находок к открытиям. Заметки с выставки «Ленинград» // Советская культура, 1964, 26 декабря.
- Третья республиканская художественная выставка «Советская Россия». Каталог. М., Министерство культуры РСФСР, 1967. С.45.
- Весенняя выставка произведений ленинградских художников 1971 года. Каталог. Л., Художник РСФСР, 1972. C.14.
- Наш современник. Каталог выставки произведений ленинградских художников 1971 года. Л., Художник РСФСР, 1972. С.14.
- По родной стране. Выставка произведений художников Ленинграда. 50-Летию образования СССР посвящается. Каталог. Л., Художник РСФСР, 1974. С.21.
- Наш современник. Зональная выставка произведений ленинградских художников 1975 года. Каталог. Л., Художник РСФСР, 1980. C.22.
- Изобразительное искусство Ленинграда. Каталог выставки. Л., Художник РСФСР, 1976. C.27.
- Зональная выставка произведений ленинградских художников 1980 года. Каталог. Л., Художник РСФСР, 1983. C.20.
- 40 лет Великой победы. Выставка произведений художников — ветеранов Великой Отечественной войны. Каталог. Л., Художник РСФСР, 1990. C.13.
- Справочник членов Ленинградской организации Союза художников РСФСР. Л., Художник РСФСР, 1987. C.106.
- Связь времен. 1932—1997. Художники — члены Санкт—Петербургского Союза художников России. Каталог выставки. СПб., ЦВЗ «Манеж», 1997. С.298.
- Мы помним… Художники, искусствоведы — участники Великой Отечественной войны. М., СХ России, 2000. С.226.
- Юбилейный Справочник выпускников Санкт-Петербургского академического института живописи, скульптуры и архитектуры имени И. Е. Репина Российской Академии художеств. 1915—2005. СПб., Первоцвет, 2007. С.68.
