= Felix Lembersky =

Soviet/Russian/Ukrainian painter

- Феликс Самойлович Лемберский
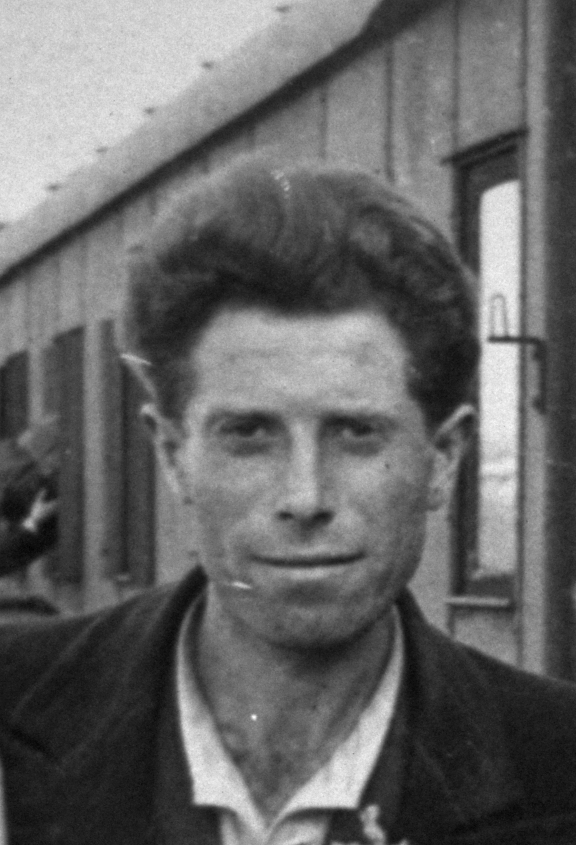
- c. 1942–44
- Born: 11 November 1913; Lublin, Congress Poland
- Died: 2 December 1970 (aged 57); Leningrad, The Soviet Union, now Saint Petersburg, Russia
- Education: Kultur-Lige, Kiev Art Institute, Institute of Painting, Sculpture and Architecture a.k.a the Academy of Art in Leningrad
- Notable work: Execution: Babi Yar, Julius Fučík triptych, First News: Revolution 1917, Reclining Woman, portraits and industrial landscapes
- Movement: Ukrainian avant-garde, Soviet avant-garde, Socialist Realism, Soviet nonconformist art
- Spouse: Lucia Keiserman Lemberskaya
- Children: Galina Lembersky

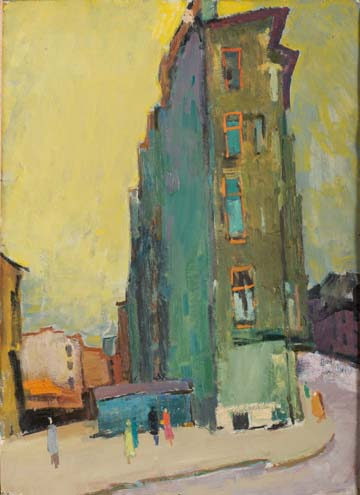
Felix Lembersky 1913–1970. Building Block after Gun Fire. Leningrad, 1959. Oil on board, 28 3/4 x 20 7/8 inches

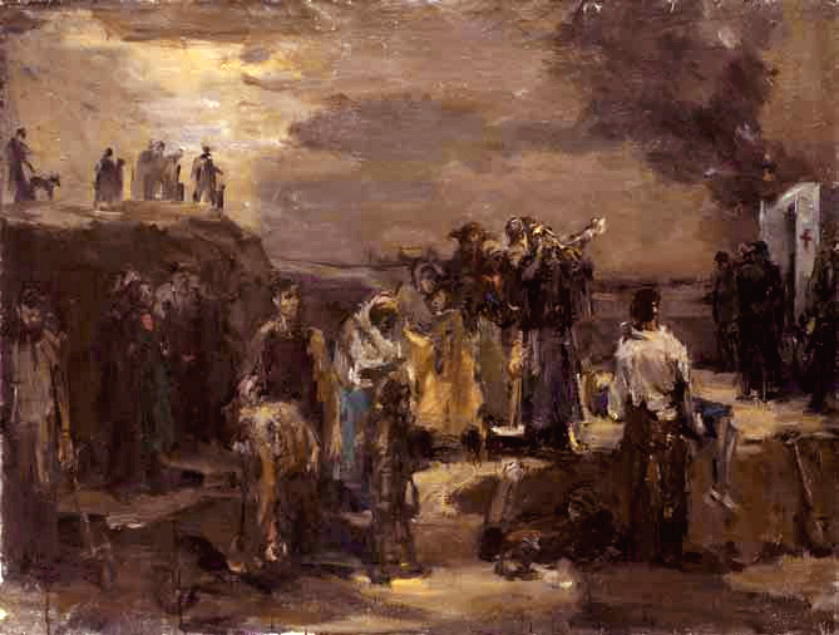
Felix Lembersky. Execution: Babi Yar, ca. 1944–1952. Oil on canvas

Felix Samoilovich Lembersky (Russian: Феликс Самойлович Лемберский, Feliks Lemberskii, Falik Lemberskiy, Falik Lembergskiy, Falik Samoilovich Lembersky, Фалик Самойлович Лемберский) (11 November 1913 – 2 December 1970) was a Soviet painter, stage designer, teacher, public lecturer, and the organizer of artistic groups. He painted in realist, impressionist, and expressionist styles, and participated in the Soviet avant-garde, Socialist Realism, and nonconformism. He created portraits, landscapes, and paintings on historical subjects. In his later work from the 1950s and '60s, he abstracted the emotional and spiritual dimensions of human experience, presenting painting as a visual puzzle that invites the viewer to look for clues through interpretive engagement with his art. His paintings, initially acclaimed, were suppressed when they no longer conformed aesthetically or politically with the demands of Soviet authorities. He is known for his 'Execution: Babi Yar' series (1944–52), which are considered to be the earliest artistic representations of the Nazi massacres of Jews in Kyiv. His work is attributed to Soviet socialist realism, expressionism, impressionism, “formalism,” brutalism, nonconformism, “Left LOSKh,” and Soviet, Ukrainian, and Jewish avant-garde.

== Biography ==
Lembersky was born in 1913 into the family of Samuil Lembersky of Lublin and relocated with his family to Berdyczów (now Berdychiv, Ukraine) following the Russian loss of Lublin to the Austro-Hungarian army in 1915. In 1928, Lembersky moved to Kiev to attend the Jewish Arts' and Trades' School (known as the "Kultur-Lige Art School," studio of Mark Epshtein). He worked as a set designer for the Jewish Theater in Kiev and Berdichev from 1930 to 1933 and attended the Kiev Art Institute from 1933 to 1935 to study painting with professor Pavel Volokidin. He then moved to Leningrad to study at the Russian Academy of Arts in 1935.

During his studies, Lembersky toured the Urals to collect material for his thesis, and he returned to Leningrad after Nazi Germany launched Operation Barbarossa against the Soviet Union on 22 June 1941. His parents remained in Berdichev and perished in the Holocaust. Lembersky was wounded during the defense operations on the outskirts of Leningrad in July 1941. He then contracted typhoid and was brought back to the Academy, which was converted into a home and a hospital for its students, professors, and staff during the war. He completed his thesis during the Siege of Leningrad and defended it in December 1941, earning a degree in easel painting with honors for academic achievement.

Lembersky joined the Union of Soviet Artists in 1944 and offered private art classes at his studio. From 1944 to 1954, he worked on commissions and portraits of workers, and he headed group projects. During this time, he created his Execution: Babi Yar series, which are the earliest known artistic renderings of the Nazi massacres of Jews in Kiev. He created the triptych Leaders and Children for Anichkov Palace in 1955, and he worked on the Novgorod and Pskov series from 1956 to 1957. He worked on the Urals Series from 1958 to 1964, and he created the Railway Pointer and Miners series and the Staraya Ladoga series during this time. Lembersky held a personal exhibition at the LOSSKh exhibition gallery in Leningrad in 1960.

Throughout the 1950s and 1960s, Lembersky spoke out for greater freedom in Soviet art, and he organized unofficial exhibitions of young artists. He died on 2 December 1970 at his home in Leningrad.

== Career ==
Lembersky joined the Leningrad Union of Artists after the war and participated in national and private art shows in Russia. He toured and worked in various places, such as the Urals, Ladoga, Pskov, and Baltic Republics. Lembersky's art was influenced by his childhood in Eastern Europe, particularly Ukraine and the Soviet Union. He was exposed to the early Soviet avant-garde during his time as a theater set designer in Kiev in the 1920s and early 1930s. He furthered his exposure to the avant-garde at the Kiev Art Institute, where Malevich and Tatlin taught, and continued to be influenced by them during his studies in the 1930s. Lembersky attended art history lectures given by Punin at the Academy of Art, and his classical education at the Academy influenced his realist and impressionist techniques. Despite state-imposed restrictions on Western art, Lembersky included various influences in his work, including German Expressionism, the French School, Mexican mural painting, Russian icons, African folk art, and Dutch and early Renaissance painting. He was interested in modernist and contemporary literature, poetry, and theater, and music was essential to his art. Lembersky's work is spiritual and frequently includes religious symbols. The memory of the Holocaust haunted Lembersky, and he included Holocaust symbols in his work. The themes of war and industrial labor appear in his work, yet his paintings are known for their brilliant color, light, and formal beauty, which evoke emotional responses and delight the eye.

== Bibliography ==
- Benjamin Goodwin, “Babi Yar Memorialised: in Soviet Poetry, Art”, essay in Music, Mortality, Memory, edited by Douglas Davies and Matthew McCullough (Leiden; Boston: Brill, 2026) ISBN 978-90-04-52037-0 LCCN 2025-49163
- Yelena Lembersky and Galina Lembersky, Like a Drop of Ink in a Downpour: Memories of Soviet Russia (Boston: Cherry Orchard Books, 2022). Finalist for Indie Book of the Year and National Jewish Book Award, in Memoir; Women’s National Book Association selection, 2022. ISBN 978-1-64469-669-9 LCCN 2021-34748
- Irina Mamonova, “Leningradskii Ekspressionism”: Solomon Gershov, Gavriil Glickman, Felix Lemberskii (Moscow: BookMart, 2020). In Russian. doi:10.1111/russ.12525
- Torn From Darkness: Works by Felix Lembersky, essays by Galina Lembersky, J. C. Troncale, et al. (Richmond, VA: University of Richmond, 2012). ISBN 978-0-9765047-0-2 LCCN 2012-946770
- Yelena Lembersky and Galina Konechna, eds., Felix Lembersky: Paintings and Drawings, essays by Alison Hilton, Yelena Lembersky, Elena Ilyina, Larisa Smirnikh, Avgust Lanin, and Natalia Lanina (Moscow: Galart, 2009). In English and Russian. ISBN 978-5-269-01080-9 LCCN 2009-462959
- Elena Ilyina, Larisa Smirnikh, and Antonina Nasedkina, Feliks Lembersky, Tvortsi–Uzniki Sovesti (Nizhny Tagil: Nizhny Tagil State Museum of Fine Art, 2006). In Russian
- Julie Masis, How My Grandfather Stole a Shoe and Survived the Holocaust in Ukraine, a memoir (Boston: Cherry Orchard Books, 2025, upcoming). Includes over eighty drawings by Felix Lembersky. ISBN 979-8-88719-709-8, 979-8-88719-710-4 LCCN 2024-47987
- Lev Ozerov, Robert Chandler Portraits without Frames (New York: New York Review Books Classics, 2018). Stair on the book cover.
- Beings and Being: Felix Lembersky, exh. cat. (London: Pushkin House, 2013)
- Felix Lembersky: Soviet Form, Jewish Context, essay by Joel Berkowitz (Milwaukee, WI: Jewish Museum Milwaukee, 2013)
- Rachel Jennae Crouch, “Felix Lembersky: Painting the Truth. The Story of a Soviet Artist’s Re-Evaluation” (BA thesis, University of Colorado, Boulder, Spring 2012)
- Faces of Babi Yar in Felix Lembersky’s Art: Presence and Absence, introduction by ChaeRan Freeze, poem by Ilyah Ehrenburg translated by Maxim Shrayer, exh. cat. (Waltham, MA: Brandeis University, 2011)
- “Project ‘Felix Samuilovich Lembersky 1913–1970’,” in Restoration as the Rebirth of Art: Restoration of Painting of the Sixteenth to Twentieth Centuries from the Collection of the Nizhny Tagil State Museum of Fine Art, essay by Antonina Nasedkina, exh. cat. (Nizhny Tagil, Russia: Nizhny Tagil State Museum of Fine Art, 2007), 72–75. In Russian
- Elena Ilyina, Larisa Smirnikh, and Marina Ageeva, Painting of the First Half of the Twentieth Century from the Collection of the Nizhny Tagil State Museum of Fine Arts (Nizhny Tagil, Russia: State Museum of Fine Art, 2004). In Russian
- Y. Ilyina and L. Smirnikh, “Felix Lembersky and Tagil Periods in His Art,” Gornozavodskoi Ural (Nizhny Tagil), 2004: 75–92. In Russian
- Natalya Lanina, Avtoportret na Fone SSSR (Saint Petersburg, Russia: Nestor-Istoria, 2010), 243–52. In Russian
- Musya Glantz, “Jewish Artists in Russian Arts: Painting and Sculpture in Soviet and Post-Soviet Eras,” in Jewish Life after the USSR, edited by Zvi Gitelman with Musya Glants and Marshall I. Goldman (Bloomington and Indianapolis: Indiana University Press, 2003), 230
- Ori Z Soltes, essay in Felix Lembersky: From Socialist Realism to Expressionism, 1942–65, exhibition catalogue (Brookville, NY: Hillwood Art Museum, 1999), LCCN 00-712626 OCLC 42294870
- Petr Kornilov, Paintings by Felix Lembersky and Sculpture by Mikhail Vayman (Leningrad: LOSKh, 1960). In Russian
- V. M. Zimenko et al., Visual Art during the Great Patriotic War (Moscow: Akademia Khudozhestv SSSR, 1951), 157–58. In Russian
- Marietta Shaginyan, Decade of the Arts in the Urals: A Collection of Essays in Six Volumes, volume 6, “About Art and Literature” (Moscow: Gosudarstvennoe Izdatelstvo Khudozhestvennoi Literaturi, 1958), 417–29
- “Decade of the Arts in the Urals,” Homefront in the Urals: A Writer’s Diary (1944), 125–26

== Periodicals and online references ==
- Felix Lembersky, website: https://lembersky.org/
- Art as a Window into the Social Unconscious: Disturbances in the Field. Encounters with Felix Lembersky. APsA DPE educational forum, national meeting, San Francisco, 2025. Catalogue, (full color, 8 pages) and slide show
- Felix Lembersky in Color, short film by Yelena Lembersky, Robert Goodwin, and Jason Blanchard. With original music by Katie Freeze created for the symposium “Faces of Babi Yar in Felix Lembersky’s Art: Presence and Absence,” Brandeis University, Waltham, MA, 2011
- Brushstrokes of Courage. Bearing Witness to the Holocaust. Felix Lembersky, short digital film by Arivalagan Gajraj, Listen Without Borders, 2023. A collaboration between the Havighurst Center of Russian and Post-Soviet Studies at Miami University, the Institute for Russian, European and Eurasian Studies at the University of South Florida, and The Melikian Center: Russian, Eurasian, and East European Studies at Arizona State University
- Herb Randall, “A Vivid Memoir by Artist Felix Lembersky’s Offspring,” Jerusalem Report, January 13, 2023
- Felix Lembersky War and Holocaust, Youtube, 2023 (online exhibition)
- Felix Lembersky Workers and Industry, Youtube, 2023 (online exhibition)
- Felix Lembersky Russia and Ukraine, Youtube, 2023 (online exhibition)
- Yelena Lembersky, “Babyn Yar and the Art of Felix Lembersky | The Florida Holocaust Museum,” Youtube, posted October 11, 2023
- In Good Faith podcast, Brigham Young University, 2023
- Grace Breen, “‘I Have Not Seen Everything Yet’: The Revolutionary Spirit of Soviet Artist Felix Lembersky,” video, Youtube, posted 2023
- Herb Randall, “‘This Feeling Will Never Leave Me’: On Yelena and Galina Lembersky’s Like a Drop of Ink in a Downpour,” The Los Angeles Review of Books, January 18, 2022
- Susan Blumberg-Kason, “Remembering the Final Years of Leningrad: A Conversation with Yelena Lembersky,” World Literature Today, May/June 2022, 22–25
- Yelena Lembersky, letter to the editor, “The Mail: Remembering Babyn Yar,” The New Yorker, May 30, 2022
- ––––––, “Babyn Yar and Putin’s War in Ukraine,” The Forward, March 3, 2022
- Rich Eldred, “Author sharing story of rescuing art from Russia at Brewster benefit for Ukraine,” wickedlocal.com, posted August 9, 2022
- Julie Masis, “Relics of a USSR Both Maddening and Sweet Emerge in Blockbuster Jewish Memoir,” The Times of Israel, July 26, 2022
- Suzanne Chessler, “Memories of Soviet Russia,” The Detroit Jewish News, 2022
- “The Art of Felix Lembersky: A conversation with Ori Z Soltes, Yelena Lembersky, and Rachel Stern," Fritz Ascher Society for Persecuted, Ostracized, and Banned Art, YouTube, posted March 15, 2022
- Robin Young, “Russian dissident mother and daughter discuss art, imprisonment and escape in new memoir,” interview of Yelena and Galina Lembersky, Here & Now, National Public Radio, May 23, 2022
- Yelena Lembersky "Bears Came to Town," Cardinal Points Literary Journal 10 (2020)
- Documentary, “Julius Fucik” television program aired in the greater Ekaterinburg district, Urals, 2015–18. In Russian.
- Jenny Miller Sechler, “Felix Lembersky: Soviet Form, Jewish Context,” Arts New England, 2015/2015
- Yelena Lembersky, “Being and Beings: Anthropomorphism in the Art of Felix Lembersky,” Cardinal Points Literary Journal 4 (2014)
- “Beings and Being: Felix Lembersky,” exhibition review, Jewish Quarterly online, posted 2013
- Financial Times (London), exhibition review, 2013
- Rafael Francisco Salas, "Jewish Museum hosts provocative artwork of the Soviet Union," Milwaukee Journal Sentinel, June 12, 2013
- Ori Z Soltes, “How Felix Lembersky Smuggled Jewish Motifs into Soviet Art,” The Forward, September 22, 2011
- ChaeRan Freeze, “Unearthed,” Tablet (online), March 10, 2011
- Ori Z Soltes, “Felix Lembersky: The Artist Uncovered,” exhibition review, Ars Judaica 7 (2011)
- Christian M. Wade, by Grace Ko, ”Postwar Russia Captured in the Art of Felix Lembersky,” BU Today, September 22, 2011
- Juhi Varma, “Scholars Discuss Nonconformism,” Art New England, November–December 2011
- Leah Burrow, “Getting Felix Lembersky his due,” The Jewish Advocate, August 26, 2011
- “One Foot in Two Worlds: Felix Lembersky at BU Hillel,” ArtsLive@BU, October 3, 2011
- Danielle Papa, "Professor Katherine O'Conner to moderate academic symposium "Revival of Art and Culture after World War II," BU Arts & Sciences, World Languages and Literatures, November 3, 2011
- Eric Herschthal, “Babi Yar and the Rose Art Museum: Things Worth Seeing,” The Jewish Week, March 1, 2011
- Leah Burrow, “A Jewish Artist’s Untold Story,” The Jewish Advocate, March 4, 2011
- Musya Glants, “Felix Lembersky: Paintings and Drawings,” book review, The Russian Review, July 2010
- Irina Karasik, “Felix Lembersky: Paintings and Drawings,” book review, Dialog Iskusstv (DI) 3, 2010
- Jesse Vestermark, “Felix Lembersky, 1913–70: Paintings and Drawings,” book review, Art Library Society of North America (ARLIS), 2009 (online)
- Mikhail Krutikov, book review, Forverts (The Forward), 2009. In Yiddish
- Jewish News (Detroit, MI), May 19, 1989
- Jewish News (Detroit, MI), July 15, 1988
- Iosif Zisman, “The Life of Felix Lembersky,” Sovetish Heimland, 1972. In Yiddish
- “Falik Lembersky,” in “Essays about Artists,” ZTYME, Krakow, December 13, 1969. In Polish
- “Felix Lembersky.” Sovetish Heimland, Moscow, 1969. In Yiddish
- “Sovetske výtvarné umenie,” Sovetskoe Iskusstvo (Trutnov, Czechoslovakia: OV SČSP, 1961). In Czech
- Soviet Landscape, essay by A. Davidov (Moscow: Iskusstvo, 1958). In Russian
- I. Berezark, “Exhibition of Tagil Artists,” Tagilskiy Rabochiy (Nizhny Tagil, Russia), May 29, 1943. In Russian
- “Trud,” Urals Almanach, 1943–44
- “The Art in the Urals Today.” Literatura I Iskusstvo, December 19, 1942. In Russian
- Marietta Shaginyan, “Decade of the Arts in the Urals,” Literatura I Iskusstvo, November 30, 1942. In Russian
- “The Work of Tagil Artists,” Tagilskiy Rabochiy (Nizhny Tagil, Russia), November 7, 1942. In Russian
- “Decade of the Arts in the Urals.” Izvestiya, October 24, 1942. In Russian
- “Tagil Artists at Work,” Tagilskiy Rabochiy (Nizhny Tagil, Russia), September 13, 1942. In Russian
- Felix Lembersky, “Let’s Organize a Union of Soviet Artists in Nizhny Tagil,” Tagilskiy Rabochiy (Nizhny Tagil, Russia), July 28, 1942. In Russian
- “Proletarskaya Pravda,” Globus, 1933. In Russian
