= Alexander Samokhvalov (artist) =

Russian painter (1894 – 1971)

- Born: Alexander Nikolayevich Samokhvalov; 21 August 1894; Bezhetsk, Tver Governorate, Russian Empire
- Died: 20 August 1971 (aged 76); Leningrad, Russian SFSR, Soviet Union
- Education: Imperial Academy of Arts; Repin Institute of Arts
- Known for: Painting, Graphics, Art teaching
- Movement: Realism
- Awards: Order of Lenin

Alexander Nikolayevich Samokhvalov (Russian: Алекса́ндр Никола́евич Самохва́лов; 21 August 1894 – 20 August 1971) was a Soviet Russian painter, watercolorist, graphic artist, illustrator, art teacher and Honored Arts Worker of the RSFSR, who lived and worked in Leningrad. He was a member of the Leningrad branch of Union of Artists of Russian Federation, and was regarded as one of the founders and brightest representatives of the Leningrad school of painting, most famous for his genre and portrait painting.

== Biography ==
Alexander Nikolayevich Samokhvalov was born on 21 August 1894 in the town of Bezhetsk, located in the Tver Governorate of the Russian Empire.

In 1914, Samokhvalov enrolled in the Higher Art School of the Imperial Academy of Arts in Saint Petersburg. He studied under Vasily Beliaev, Gugo Zaleman, Kuzma Petrov-Vodkin, and Vasily Shukhayev; among his teachers, the most important was Petrov-Vodkin, with his dimensional system of painting design and correlation of colour and form.

Cafe Gurzuf. 1956

Samokhvalov traveled with Petrov-Vodkin to Samarkand in 1921 as a member of the Expedition of Institute for History of Material Culture, and it was a critical moment in his life and outlook. Another powerful influence on his style was his participation in the restoration process of Georgy's Cathrdral in Staraya Ladoga in 1926, where he discovered an ancient Russian painting.

He graduated from Petrograd VKHUTEIN (known as the Ilya Repin Institute since 1944) in 1923. His diploma was "Dressing-down" (State Russian Museum), where he tried to use "spherical perspective" in the spirit of Petrov-Vodkin, and came close to surrealism.

Samokhvalov had participated in art exhibitions since 1914, and in 1917 he took part in the exhibition of the Mir iskusstva. He painted portraits, genre and historical paintings, as well as monumental and easel painting, black-and-white art, sculpture, decorative and applied art, and illustrations for fiction and poetry. He produced book graphics from the middle of the 1920s, and began working with scenography in the 1930s at the Bolshoi Drama Theater and Russian State Pushkin Academy Drama Theater in Leningrad and Novosibirsk.

He was very successful in images of heroes of labour and sport (Conductressa (1928); Girl with the kernel (1933), famous watercoloured series Builder of Metro (1933—1934), all at State Russian Museum), all of which had peculiar surrealistic charm. He was the creator of a significant work of the Soviet Epoch of the 1930s with his painting Girl in T-shirt (1932). In 1937, it was awarded the gold medal at the International Art Fair in Paris, France. At the same time, Samokhvalov took two Grand-Prix awards for his panel Soviet Athletics and illustrations for The History of a Town by Mikhail Saltykov-Shchedrin.

Samokhvalov was a member of the "Krug" (1926–1929) and "October" (1930–1932) artists' associations, and was a member of the Leningrad Union of Artists beginning in 1932. His leading theme was Soviet youth. He was awarded an honorary title from the Honored Art Worker of Russian Federation in 1967.

Samokhvalov created many genre and historical paintings by commission; among them were Sergey Kirov Greeting Parad of Athletes (1935, State Russian Museum), Appearance of Vladimir Lenin in All-Russian Congress of Soviets (1939, State Russian Museum), Parade of Victory (1947, sketch for Palace of the Soviets, private collection), Sergey Kirov and Iosif Stalin at the Building of Volkhov Power Station (1950, private collection, London), and others. Among his works also easel paintings: Vladimir Lenin and Iosif Stalin at the 2nd Congress of RSDLP (1939, State Russian Museum), Front Friends (1946), Stalingrad Resident, Thinking of Battle Days (both 1948), Portrait of Yevgeny Mravinsky (1950), In the Sun (1953), Cafe "Gurzuf" (1956), Portrait of Maria Kleshar (1958).

From 1948 to 1951, Samokhvalov taught in the monumental painting department at the Leningrad Higher School of Art and Industry named Vera Mukhina, and he authored a memoir titled My Way of Creation (1977), At the Time of Restless Sun (1996).

His personal exhibitions were in Leningrad (1963, 1968, 1975, State Russian Museum and "House of Writes"), Moscow (1964), Saint Petersburg (1994, 2014 State Russian Museum), Tver (1994).

In 1967, Samokhvalov was awarded the Order of Lenin for outstanding contribution to development of Soviet art.

Alexander Nikolayevich Samokhvalov died in Leningrad on 20 August 1971. His paintings and graphics reside in the State Russian Museum, State Tretyakov Gallery, other art museums, and private collections in Russia, Italy, France, the US, Japan, Germany, England and throughout the world.

== Awards ==
- Gold Medal of International Exposition of Modern Industrial and Decorative Arts, Paris, 1925 (for poster).
- Grand Prix of Exposition Internationale des Arts et Techniques dans la Vie Moderne, Paris, 1937 (for the Monumental painting "The Physical Culture of USSR").
- Grand Prix of Exposition Internationale des Arts et Techniques dans la Vie Moderne, Paris, 1937 (for the Illustration of the story of Mikhail Saltykov-Shchedrin "The History of a Town").
- Gold Medal of Exposition Internationale des Arts et Techniques dans la Vie Moderne, Paris, 1937 (for the painting Girl in a T-shirt).
- Order of Lenin, Moscow, 1967 (for outstanding contribution to development of the Soviet art).

== See also ==
- Cafe Gurzuf (painting by Alexander Samokhvalov)
- In the Sun (painting by Alexander Samokhvalov)
- Fine Art of Leningrad
- Leningrad School of Painting
- List of painters of Saint Petersburg Union of Artists
- Saint Petersburg Union of Artists

== Sources ==
- Центральный Государственный Архив литературы и искусства. СПб. Ф.78. Оп.3. Д.49.
- Стругацкий Н. Александр Самохвалов. Искусство, № 5, 1933.
- Стругацкий Н. Александр Самохвалов. Л.-М., 1933.
- Выставка лучших произведений советских художников. Путеводитель. М., Государственная Третьяковская галерея, 1941.
- Выставка живописи, графики и скульптуры. Советские художники ко дню 60-летия К. Е. Ворошилова. М., Искусство, 1941.
- Каталог выставки лучших произведений советского искусства. Новосибирск, Комитет по делам искусств при СНК СССР, 1942.
- Героический фронт и тыл. Всесоюзная художественная выставка. Каталог. М., Государственная Третьяковская галерея, 1945.
- Выставка этюдов ленинградских художников. Каталог. Л., ЛССХ, 1945.
- Всесоюзная художественная выставка. Каталог. М., Государственная Третьяковская галерея, 1946.
- Выставка произведений ленинградских художников 1947 года. Каталог. Л., ЛОСХ, 1948.
- Всесоюзная художественная выставка 1947 года. Каталог. М.-Л., Комитет по делам искусств при СМ СССР, 1947.
- Всесоюзная художественная выставка 1949 года. Живопись. Скульптура. Графика. Каталог. М., ГТГ, 1950.
- Выставка произведений ленинградских художников 1951 года. Каталог. Л., Лениздат, 1951. С.18, 48.
- 1917—1957. Выставка произведений ленинградских художников. Каталог. Л., Ленинградский художник, 1958. С.28, 70—71.
- Никифоровская И. Итоги большой творческой работы // Вечерний Ленинград. 1957, 10 октября.
- Бродский В. Жизнеутверждающее искусство // Ленинградская правда, 1957, 11 октября.
- Всесоюзная художественная выставка, посвящённая 40-летию Великой Октябрьской социалистической революции. Каталог. М., Советский художник, 1957. С.69.
- Всесоюзная художественная выставка «40 лет ВЛКСМ». Каталог. М., Министерство культуры СССР, 1958.
- Осенняя выставка произведений ленинградских художников 1958 года. Каталог. Л., Художник РСФСР, 1959. С.24.
- Советская Россия. Республиканская художественная выставка. Каталог. М., Министерство культуры РСФСР, 1960. С.73.
- Выставка произведений ленинградских художников 1960 года. Каталог. Л., Художник РСФСР, 1963. С.16.
- Выставка произведений ленинградских художников 1960 года. Каталог. Л., Художник РСФСР, 1961. С.36.
- Александр Николаевич Самохвалов. Выставка произведений. Каталог. Л., Художник РСФСР, 1963.
- Баршова И., Сазонова К. Александр Николаевич Самохвалов. Л., Художник РСФСР, 1963.
- Выставка произведений ленинградских художников 1961 года. Каталог. Л., Художник РСФСР, 1964. С.36.
- «Ленинград». Зональная выставка. Л., Художник РСФСР, 1965. С.48.
- Молдавский Д. «Ленинград». На зональных художественных выставках // Литературная Россия, 1964, 27 ноября.
- Дмитренко А. Взором современника // Смена, 1964, 27 декабря.
- Третья Республиканская художественная выставка «Советская Россия». Каталог. М., МК РСФСР, 1967. С.50.
- Молдавский Д. Выставка Александра Самохвалова / Смена, 1968, 31 января.
- Щеглов Е. Эпоха Ленина в творчестве художников России // Советская культура, 1970, 28 февраля.
- Каталог произведений художников Российской Федерации, переданных в дар организациям и учреждениям культуры (1963—1971 гг.). М., СХ РСФСР, 1972. С.95.
- Выставки советского изобразительного искусства. Справочник. Т.3. 1941—1947 годы. М., Советский художник, 1973. С.7, 10, 15, 32, 68, 90, 93, 122, 137, 181, 213, 214, 215, 232, 263, 272, 335, 342.
- Бродский В. О своих современниках // Ленинградская правда, 1975, 26 января.
- Савин В. Встреча с «Метростроевкой» // Смена, 1975, 28 января.
- Яковлева Л. Величие подвига // Вечерний Ленинград, 1975, 27 мая.
- Мямлин И. Сердце с правдой вдвоём... // Ленинградская правда, 1975, 1 июня.
- Леняшин В. Думая о будущем. Время. Художник. Творчество // Вечерний Ленинград, 1976, 26 января.
- Изобразительное искусство Ленинграда. Каталог выставки. Л., Художник РСФСР, 1976. С.29, 187.
- Самохвалов А. Мой творческий путь. Л., Художник РСФСР, 1977.
- Выставки советского изобразительного искусства. Справочник. Т.5. 1954—1958 годы. М., Советский художник, 1981. С.9, 121, 141, 377, 387, 446, 535, 549.
- Зингер Л. Александр Самохвалов. М., Советский художник, 1982.
- Шевчук С. Фантазии Самохвалова // Вечерний Ленинград, 1986, 28 января.
- L' École de Leningrad. Catalogue. Paris, Drouot Richelieu, 25 Novembre 1991. Р.60—64.
- Самохвалов А. Моя Самаркандия. СПб., Искусство России, 1993.
- Ленинградские художники. Живопись 1950—1980 годов. Каталог. СПб., Выставочный центр ПСХ, 1994. С.6.
- Александр Николаевич Самохвалов. Каталог выставки. Тверь, Издательство «Приз», 1994.
- Этюд в творчестве ленинградских художников. Выставка произведений. Каталог. СПб., Мемориальный музей Н. А. Некрасова, 1994. С.6.
- Лирика в произведениях художников военного поколения. Живопись. Графика. Каталог. СПб., Мемориальный музей Н. А. Некрасова, 1995. С.6.
- Самохвалов Александр Николаевич. В годы беспокойного солнца. СПб., Всемирное слово, 1996.
- Живопись 1940—1990 годов. Ленинградская школа. Выставка произведений. СПб., Мемориальный музей Н. А. Некрасова, 1996. С.4.
- Связь времён. 1932—1997. Художники — члены Санкт-Петербургского Союза художников России. Каталог выставки. СПб., ЦВЗ «Манеж», 1997. С.298.
- Vern G. Swanson. Soviet Impressionism. Woodbridge, England, Antique Collectors' Club, 2001. Р.288.
- Russian Fine & Decorative Art. Dallas, Texas, Heritage Auction Galleries, November 14, 2008. Р.170.
- Matthew C. Bown. Dictionary of 20th Century Russian and Soviet Painters 1900-1980s. London, Izomar, 1998. ISBN 0-9532061-0-6, ISBN 978-0-9532061-0-0.
- Sergei V. Ivanov. Unknown Socialist Realism. The Leningrad School. Saint Petersburg, NP-Print Edition, 2007. P.3, 20, 24, 369, 380-396, 398, 399, 401-406, 439, 442, 443, 444, 446. ISBN 5-901724-21-6, ISBN 978-5-901724-21-7.
- Щербань В. Поздний период творчества Александра Самохвалова // Петербургские искусствоведческие тетради. Вып. 11. СПб, 2008. С.92-101.
- Слудняков А. Творчество Николая Ионина в контексте развития ленинградской живописной школы 1920-х — 1940-х годов. Автореферат диссертации. СПб., 2009.
- Санкт-Петербургская государственная художественно-промышленная академия им. А. Л. Штиглица. Кафедра монументально-декоративной живописи. СПб., Искусство России. 2011. С.66.
- Чегодаева М. Многообразие психологической и эмоциональной характеристики образов в портретах, созданных А. Н. Самохваловым в пятидесятых годах ХХ века // Петербургские искусствоведческие тетради. Вып. 22. СПб, 2011. С.201-212.
- Иванов С. Инвестиции в советскую живопись: ленинградская школа // Петербургские искусствоведческие тетради. Вып. 31. СПб, 2014. С.54-60.
- Alexander Samokhvalov. 1894—1971. Saint Petersburg, Palace Editions, 2014.
