= Alexander Naumov =

Russian painter

- Born: Alexander Alexandrovich Naumov; 28 December 1935; Podolsk, USSR
- Died: 31 December 2010 (aged 75); Saint Petersburg
- Education: Repin Institute of Arts
- Known for: Painting
- Movement: Realism

Alexander Alexandrovich Naumov (Russian: Алекса́ндр Алекса́ндрович Нау́мов; 28 December 1935 – 31 December 2010) was a Soviet, Russian painter, lived and worked in Saint Petersburg, member of the Saint Petersburg Union of Artists (before 1992 - the Leningrad branch of Union of Artists of Russian Federation), regarded as a representative of the Leningrad school of painting, the most known for his works depicting Central Asia.

== Biography ==
Naumov was born on 28 December 1935 in Podolsk city, near Moscow, USSR.

In 1951 Naumov family went to Leningrad. In 1951–1952, Naumov was engaged in drawing and painting in the Art Studio House of Culture named after A. Tsurupa.

In 1958 Naumov entered the design department of the Vera Mukhina Art Institute in Leningrad. He studied painting and drawings of Sergei Osipov, and Yaroslav Krestovsky.

In 1961 Naumov left Vera Mukhina Art Institute and entered the first course of painting department of Leningrad Institute of Painting, Sculpture and Architecture namen after Ilya Repin. He studied of Nikolai Babasuk, Pen Varlen, Vasily Sokolov, Leonid Khudiakov, and Alexander Zaytsev.

In 1967 Naumov graduated from Leningrad Institute of Painting, Sculpture and Architecture namen after Ilya Repin in Alexander Zaytsev's personal art studio (formerly the art studio of Boris Ioganson). His graduation work was historical painting named "Come back to native village", dedicated to events of the Civil War in Russia.

Since 1967 Naumov has participated in Art Exhibitions. He painted genre and historical paintings, cityscapes, still lifes, sketches from the life. His solo exhibition was in Leningrad in 1967.

A significant part of the artist's works is subject of the East. The material for his paintings led to numerous studies from the life and personal experiences from trips to Central Asia (Bukhara, Samarkand, Tashkent).

Another important theme Naumov paintings become ancient Russian cities, their architectural ensembles and special way of life. The artist has visited and wrote Suzdal, Old Ladoga, Staritsa, Izborsk, Solovetsky Islands, Vladimir, and others. That is reflected in his work.

Painting of 1960s, where Naumov masterfully conveyed the nuances of tonal relationships and the interplay of light and shade, change in the future toward more decorative color, more abstract drawing and composition, the total renunciation of the principles of plein air painting.

Naumov is a member of the Leningrad Union of Artists since 1977.

Paintings by Naumov reside in Art museums and private collections in Russia, England, Uzbekistan, in the U.S., China, Japan, and other countries.

== See also ==
- Leningrad School of Painting
- List of painters of Saint Petersburg Union of Artists
- List of the Russian Landscape painters
- Saint Petersburg Union of Artists

== Bibliography ==
- Matthew C. Bown. Dictionary of 20th Century Russian and Soviet Painters 1900-1980s. - London: Izomar, 1998. ISBN 0-9532061-0-6, ISBN 978-0-9532061-0-0.
- Sergei V. Ivanov. Unknown Socialist Realism. The Leningrad School. - Saint Petersburg: NP-Print Edition, 2007. – pp. 9, 18, 21, 366, 390, 393-395, 402, 404, 405. ISBN 5-901724-21-6, ISBN 978-5-901724-21-7.
