= Evgeny Pozdniakov =

Russian painter

Evgeny Mikhailovich Pozdniakov
- Born: 9 July 1923; Petrograd, USSR
- Died: 1991 (aged 67–68); Leningrad, USSR
- Education: Vera Mukhina Institute
- Known for: Painting
- Movement: Realism

Evgeny Mikhailovich Pozdniakov (Russian: Евге́ний Миха́йлович Поздняко́в; 9 July 1923, Petrograd, USSR – 1991, Leningrad, USSR) was a Soviet, Russian painter, lived and worked in Leningrad, member of the Leningrad branch of Union of Artists of Russian Federation), regarded as one of representatives of the Leningrad school of painting, most known for his landscape paintings.

== Biography ==
Evgeny Mikhailovich Pozdniakov was born on 9 July 1923 in Petrograd (former Saint Petersburg, in 1924 renamed of Leningrad), USSR.

In years 1933-1938, Evgeny Pozdniakov studied drawing and painting at Art studio of the City Palace of Young Pioneers, then in the Secondary Art School at the All-Russian Academy of Art in Leningrad, pupil of Vladimir Gorb.

In July 1941 Evgeny Pozdniakov was drafted into the Red Army. He was a veteran of World War II, participated in the defense of the Leningrad. Evgeny Pozdniakov was wounded, he had a military orders.

In year 1948, after the German-Soviet War and demobilization Evgeny Pozdniakov entered in Vera Mukhina Institute of Art and Design. He studied painting and drawing of Ivan Stepashkin, Gleb Savinov, Piotr Buchkin, Alexander Kazantsev.

In 1955 Evgeny Pozdniakov graduated from Higher Art and Industry School named after Vera Mukhina in Alexander Kazantsev personal workshop. His graduation work was a multi-figure decorative frieze "Builders of Communism" for the foyer of the concert hall of the Kalinin district Council of Leningrad, performed in the technique of grisaille.

Since 1955 Evgeny Pozdniakov has participated in Art Exhibitions. He painted landscapes, portraits, genre paintings, sketches from the life, worked on the restoration of paintings and monuments of architecture, design and construction of museum and exhibition displays.

In the years of 1950-1970 the leading genre of Evgeny Pozdniakov works was a landscape, the main theme - the picturesque neighborhood of town of Maloyaroslavets and Krasny Kholm town in the north-east of Tver Province. Evgeny Pozdniakov drawn to the panoramic landscape with wide distances and a lot of clearly legible plans. Stylistically his works based on the experiences of Russian landscape painting of the 19th - early 20th century.

Evgeny Pozdniakov was a member of the Leningrad Union of Artists since 1985.

Evgeny Mikhailovich Pozdniakov died in Leningrad in 1991. Paintings by Evgeny Pozdniakov are in art museums and private collections in Russia, USA, France, England, Japan, and other countries.

== See also ==
- Leningrad School of Painting
- List of Russian artists
- List of 20th-century Russian painters
- List of painters of Saint Petersburg Union of Artists
- List of the Russian Landscape painters
- Saint Petersburg Union of Artists

== Bibliography ==
- Directory of members of the Leningrad branch of Union of Artists of Russian Federation. - Leningrad: Khudozhnik RSFSR, 1987. - p. 104.
- Sergei V. Ivanov. Unknown Socialist Realism. The Leningrad School. - Saint Petersburg: NP-Print Edition, 2007. – pp. 18, 29, 130, 256, 313, 367, 400, 402-405, 420-423. ISBN 5-901724-21-6, ISBN 978-5-901724-21-7.
