= Anatoli Levitin =

Russian painter (1922–2018)

- Анатолий Левитин
- Born: July 16, 1922; Moscow, Soviet Russia
- Died: October 11, 2018 (aged 96)
- Education: Repin Institute of Arts
- Known for: Painting
- Movement: Realism
- Awards: Order of Honour; Order of the Patriotic War; Medal "For the Victory Over Germany"; Medal "For the Defence of the Caucasus"

Anatoli Pavlovich Levitin (Russian: Анатолий Павлович Левитин; July 16, 1922 – October 11, 2018) was a Soviet Russian painter and art educator, People's Artist of the Russian Federation, a member of the Saint Petersburg Union of Artists (before 1992 named the Leningrad Union of Artists), who lived and worked in Saint Petersburg and Krasnoyarsk, regarded as one of representatives of the Leningrad school of painting, most famous for his genre and portrait paintings.

In March 2014 he signed a letter in support of the position of the President of Russia Vladimir Putin on the issue of Ukraine and the adoption of Crimea into the Russian Federation based on the results of a referendum held in Crimea.

== See also ==
- Leningrad School of Painting
- List of 20th-century Russian painters
- List of painters of Saint Petersburg Union of Artists
- Saint Petersburg Union of Artists

== Sources ==
- Земская М. За правду жизни и большую мысль. К итогам осенней выставки ленинградских художников // Смена, 1954, 18 декабря.
- Серов В. Знать жизнь, показывать правду жизни // Ленинградский альманах. Кн. 8. Л., Лениздат, 1954. С.306-311.
- Серебряный И. Молодые живописцы // Ленинградский альманах. Кн. 9. Л., Лениздат, 1954. С.338-342.
- Осенняя выставка произведений ленинградских художников 1956 года. Каталог. Л., Ленинградский художник, 1958. С.15.
- 1917 — 1957. Выставка произведений ленинградских художников. Каталог. Л., Ленинградский художник, 1958. С.19.
- Бродский В. Жизнеутверждающее искусство. // Ленинградская правда, 1957, 11 октября.
- Воеводин Е. Славные страницы революционной истории // Вечерний Ленинград. 1957, 4 ноября.
- Всесоюзная художественная выставка, посвящённая 40-летию Великой Октябрьской социалистической революции. Каталог. М., Советский художник, 1957. С.43.
- Недошивин Г. Окрыляющие перспективы. На Всесоюзной художественной выставке // Правда, 1957, 18 декабря.
- Грабарь И. Заметки о живописи на Всесоюзной выставке 1957 года // Искусство. 1958, No. 1. С.14-17.
- Двести лет Академии художеств СССР. Каталог выставки. Л.-М., Искусство, 1958. C.172.
- Шведова В. Над чем работают ленинградские художники // Художник. 1959, No. 9.
- Шмаринов Д. Новый этап - новые задачи // Художник. 1960, No. 8. С.2.
- Архангельский В. О детях и для детей // Художник. 1960, No. 8. С.19.
- Выставка произведений ленинградских художников 1960 года. Каталог. Л., Художник РСФСР, 1961. C.25.
- Ленинград. Зональная выставка. Л., Художник РСФСР, 1965. С.30.
- Буткевич О. От находок к открытиям. Заметки с выставки «Ленинград» // Советская культура, 1964, 26 декабря.
- Богданов А. О нашем современнике // Вечерний Ленинград, 1971, 5 апреля.
- Дмитренко А. Мир современника // Ленинградская правда, 1975, 12 октября.
- Аникушин М. Создавать произведения, созвучные эпохе // Ленинградская правда, 1976, 9 января.
- Наш современник. Зональная выставка произведений ленинградских художников 1975 года. Каталог. Л., Художник РСФСР, 1980. C.18.
- Богданов А. О людях труда // Вечерний Ленинград, 1975, 3 ноября.
- Вишняков Б. Девиз: Наш современник. Заметки с V Республиканской выставки «Советская Россия» // Правда, 1975, 7 декабря.
- Художник. 1976, No. 2. С.8.
- Справочник членов Союза художников СССР. Т. 1. М., Советский художник, 1979. C.619.
- Зональная выставка произведений ленинградских художников 1980 года. Каталог. — Л: Художник РСФСР, 1983. — с.16.
- Справочник членов Ленинградской организации Союза художников РСФСР. — Л: Художник РСФСР, 1980. — с.73.
- Леняшин В. Поиски художественной правды // Художник. 1981, No. 1. С.8-17.
- Левандовский С. Живопись на Ленинградской зональной // Искусство. 1981, No. 2. С.63.
- L' École de Leningrad. Auction Catalogue. Paris, Drouot Richelieu, 11 Juin 1990. P.148-149.
- Выставка, посвящённая 55-летию победы в Великой Отечественной войне. СПб, 2000. С.6.
- Мы помним… Художники, искусствоведы — участники Великой Отечественной войны. М., Союз художников России, 2000. C.169.
- Художники — городу. Выставка к 70-летию Санкт-Петербургского Союза художников. Каталог. СПб., Петрополь, 2003. С.180.
- Sergei V. Ivanov. Unknown Socialist Realism. The Leningrad School. Saint Petersburg, NP-Print Edition, 2007. P.15, 384, 388, 390–393, 399, 402, 405, 406. ISBN 5-901724-21-6, ISBN 978-5-901724-21-7.
- Юбилейный Справочник выпускников Санкт-Петербургского академического института живописи, скульптуры и архитектуры имени И. Е. Репина Российской Академии художеств. 1915—2005. СПб., «Первоцвет», 2007. С.57. ISBN 978-5-903677-01-6.
- Иванов С. О творчестве и судьбе Николая Позднеева // Петербургские искусствоведческие тетради. Вып. 30. СПб, 2014. С.25-32.
