= Varlen Pen =

Korean Russian artist (1916–1990)

- Born: September 29, 1916; Russian Empire
- Died: May 26, 1990 (aged 73); Leningrad, USSR
- Resting place: Severnoye Kladbishche Cemetery
- Education: Repin Institute of Arts
- Known for: Painting
- Movement: Realism

Pen Varlen (Russian: Пен Варлен; Korean: 변월룡; Hanja: 邊月龍; MR: Pyŏn Wŏlryong; September 29, 1916 – May 26, 1990) was a Soviet Russian-Korean painter and graphic artist.

He was a member of the Leningrad Union of Artists, lived and worked in Leningrad, regarded as a representative of the Leningrad school of painting, and most famous for his portrait paintings. Pen also spent 15 months as a Professor and Dean at the Pyongyang Fine Arts University in North Korea between 1953 and 1954. In 2016, the National Museum of Modern and Contemporary Art held an exhibition in his name.

== Early life ==
Pen Varlen was born on September 29, 1916, into a Korean refugee settlement located in Shkotovsky, Primorski Krai (southeast Siberia). He completed his primary education in Shinhanchon (New Koreatown) located in Vladivostok. Afterwards, his parents sent him to study art in the Sverdlovsk Art School near the Ural Mountains in current day Yekaterinburg. In 1937, while Pen completed his studies in the Sverdlovsk Art School, his parents were forcefully relocated to Central Asia under Stalin's efforts to deport minority groups from within Russia. With his parents no longer there, Pen remained in the country and after graduating from the Sverdlovsk Art School, enrolled in the prestigious Ilya Repin Leningrad Academy of Painting, Sculpture and Architecture (established in 1764). He worked closely with his supervisor, Alexander Osmerkin, on the completion of his dissertation work titled "Fishermen in Choson" (1947), also known as "Korean Fishermen". However, shortly after Pen's graduation, Osmerkin became ostracized in the Soviet art scene due to his support of foreign, non-Soviet art. Nonetheless, Pen's work remained prominent both in the Iliya Repin Leningrad Academy of Painting, and the wider Soviet art scene.

Between 1942 and 1944, Pen fled to Samarkand in Uzbekistan in order to avoid the German invasion. In 1951, a few years after his return to Russia, Pen earned his doctorate degree and began working as a professor of the Drawing Department at the Ilya Repin Leningrad Academy of Painting, Sculpture and Architecture. He spent 35 years as an educator at the Academy. Additionally, Pen became a member of the Leningrad Union of Artists.

During his time at the Repin Institute, Pen focused on portraying Korean ethnic subjects with the influence of pro-Soviet themes, highlighting the victorious role that the Soviet Union played in liberating Korea from Japanese colonial rule. Additionally, Pen had work featured in Moscow during the 1950 all Soviet Art Exhibition. The works included in the exhibition featured a portrait of Kim Il Sung, a portrait of Mao Zedong, and a painting of Vladimir Lenin and Joseph Stalin titled "Lenin and Stalin in the Resort".

In 1953, Pen traveled to North Korea under the orders of the Soviet Ministry of Culture.

== Career ==
=== North Korea ===
Pen arrived in North Korea in 1953, shortly before the July 28 armistice treaty between North and South Korea. As such, Pen witnessed some of the crucial events of the armistice, including the return of Prisoners of War which took place at Panmumjeom. This event was eternalized in his painting titled "Repatriation of North Korean Prisoners of War at Panmunjom" (1953).

During the Korean War, 90% of buildings in Pyongyang were destroyed. This included the Pyongyang Art Academy, also known as the Pyongyang College of Arts. Pen, who was fluent in Korean, was sent to help restore the Pyongyang College of Arts with the expectation of integrating Soviet education and policy into the North Korean art scene. At the Pyongyang College of Arts, Pen helped construct a new curriculum based on Socialist Realism, the main principles of which included "people-ness, class-ness, party-ness, revolutionary romanticism, optimism, hurtfulness, humanism, and the unity of content and form". As a Dean and Professor at the Pyongyang College of Arts, Pen also organized an exhibition in celebration of the ninth anniversary of Korea's liberation from Japan.

At the Pyongyang College of Fine Arts, Pen introduced a new form of art training referred to as "field sketching" or "direct rendering of objects", which continues to be practiced today. Pen often took his students on field trips to various locations throughout Pyongyang in order to encourage them to draw realistic subject matter as part of their 'field sketching' training. Pen also used this training method as a means to eradicate Formalism in the North Korean art scene, which he believed stemmed from the previous Japanese Colonial rule.

As an addition to his 'field sketching' technique, Pen traveled into North Korea with plaster busts of Western ethnic heads as to teach accurate depiction of physiognomy to his students. After his departure from North Korea, the Pyongyang College of Arts replaced Pen's busts with ones showcasing Korean faces and physiognomy, which remain as a tool used in classes today. This replacement of the busts was implemented as part of the introduction of the "Juche" ideology, created by Kim Il Sung in order to distance North Korea from the Soviet Union and its influence.

In February 1954, Pen traveled to China where he met with the ink-painter Qi Baishi. After his return to North Korea, Pen successfully integrated a division for ink and brush painting at the Pyongyang College of Arts. This division was referred to as "Chosonhwa". However, Pen was unable to fully realize his vision for 'Chosonhwa' as he left North Korea and returned to the Soviet Union in September 1954.

=== Return to the Soviet Union ===
In September 1954, Pen Varlen returned to the Soviet Union due to an illness prompted by overworking himself in North Korea. According to Chong Gwanchol (1916–1983), a colleague of Pen's at the Pyongyang College of Arts, Pen had spent over 2,103 hours training both students and faculty during his 15 month stay in North Korea. Pen originally planned a short visit to the Soviet Union in order to heal and restock on art supplies. However, shortly after Pen arrived in Russia, Kim Il Sung began to target Soviet-Koreans living in North Korea, which was referred to as the "August Faction Incident".

In 1955, Pen was offered North Korean citizenship due his Korean ethnicity. His offer originated from an agreement made under the "Juche" ideology between Kim Il Sung and the Soviet Union with the aim to abolish dual citizenship. However, Pen refused to give up his Russian citizenship. Thus, he was no longer able to travel back to North Korea or continue to be a part of the North Korean art scene. Even though his "field sketching" technique and the 'Chosonhwa' division he was responsible for creating at the Pyongyang College of Arts remain today, Pen is no longer credited for them.

Once back in the Soviet Union, Pen greatly missed North Korea and continued to create art based on sketches he had made during his time at Pyongyang. Most of these paintings were of scenes such as small rural towns or of Mount Kumgang.

== Death ==
Pen died on May 26, 1990, after suffering from a stroke in 1985. His last words were a request to have his ethnic Korean name, Byun Wol-ryong, engraved on his tombstone. This request was realized by his family and his body now lies to rest at the Severnoye Kladbishche Cemetery in Saint Petersburg.

== Exhibit ==
A retrospective exhibition honoring a century from Pen Varlen's birth was organized by the National Museum of Modern and Contemporary Art's Deoksugung Museum. The exhibition ran from March 3 to May 8, 2016.

The retrospective was separated into four sections corresponding to the following themes: 'Panorama of Leningrad', 'Portraits with Souls', 'Journey to Pyongyang', and 'Landscapes of Diaspora'. In total, there were more than 200 works exhibited at the retrospective, including oil paintings, etchings, lithographs, and drawings. This was the first time Pen's work was showcased in Korea at such a scale. Previously, Pen had art featured in the NMMCA's 2005 Centennial of Korean Art exhibition, where his work was shown as part of the "Liberation and Division" section in commemoration of 60 years since the liberation of the Koreas from Japanese Colonial rule.

The 'Panorama of Leningrad' and 'Portraits with Souls' themes of Pen's retrospective included artwork showcasing his years as a student at the Repin Leningrad Academy. These paintings depicted Socialist Realism, portraits of famous individuals, as well as portraits of Pen's family. A 1985 portrait of Pen's mother was also featured in the exhibition. It is the only portrait Pen ever created of his mother. The 'Journey to Pyongyang' section of the retrospective featured artwork of scenes and landscapes from North Korea, most of which Pen painted after his return to the Soviet Union. The 'Landscapes of Diaspora' theme of the exhibition covered destinations Pen traveled to within Europe after his return to Russia in 1954.

The retrospective was created through the collaborative work of Park Hye-sung, the exhibit's curator, and Moon Young-dai, an art critic and collector of Pen's work. Moon won the 2017 Yumin Award in Culture for his research into Pen's life, shedding light on the artist's contribution to Korean art history. Moon first learned about Pen during a trip he took to Russia in 1994, where he came across one of the paintings of the Russian-Korean artist hung up on a wall. He immediately recognized the inherent connection to Korean culture in Pen's painting and began his research into the artist's life.

Many of Pen's artworks continue to be displayed in Russian institutions and buildings, while the location of others remain a mystery.

== See also ==
- Leningrad School of Painting
- List of 20th-century Russian painters
- List of painters of Saint Petersburg Union of Artists
- Saint Petersburg Union of Artists

== Bibliography ==
- Выставка произведений ленинградских художников 1951 года. Каталог. Л., Лениздат, 1951. C.16.
- Выставка произведений ленинградских художников 1950 года. Каталог. М-Л., Искусство, 1951. C.20.
- Весенняя выставка произведений ленинградских художников 1955 года. Каталог. Л., ЛССХ, 1956. C.14-15.
- Осенняя выставка произведений ленинградских художников. 1956 года. Каталог. Л., Ленинградский художник, 1958. C.19.
- Мочалов Л. Выставка без жюри. Новые работы ленинградских живописцев. // Вечерний Ленинград, 1956, 11 декабря.
- 1917 — 1957. Выставка произведений ленинградских художников. Каталог. Л., Ленинградский художник, 1958. С.24.
- Осенняя выставка произведений ленинградских художников 1958 года. Каталог. Л., Художник РСФСР, 1959. С.21.
- Выставка произведений ленинградских художников 1960 года. Каталог. Л., Художник РСФСР, 1963. С.15.
- Выставка произведений ленинградских художников 1960 года. Каталог. Л., Художник РСФСР, 1961. С.31.
- Республиканская художественная выставка «Советская Россия». Каталог. М., Советский художник, 1960. С.63.
- Выставка произведений ленинградских художников 1961 года. Каталог. Л., Художник РСФСР, 1964. С.31.
- Осенняя выставка произведений ленинградских художников 1962 года. Каталог. Л., Художник РСФСР, 1962. С.21.
- Ленинград. Зональная выставка 1964 года. Каталог. Л, Художник РСФСР, 1965. C.40.
- Кривенко И. «Ленинград» (раздел живописи) // Художник. 1965, № 3. С.27-36.
- Третья республиканская художественная выставка «Советская Россия». Каталог. М., Министерство культуры РСФСР, 1967. С.43.
- Наш современник. Зональная выставка произведений ленинградских художников 1975 года. Каталог. Л., Художник РСФСР, 1980. C.21.
- Портрет современника. Пятая выставка произведений ленинградских художников 1976 года. Каталог. Л., Художник РСФСР, 1983. C.17.
- Изобразительное искусство Ленинграда. Каталог выставки. Л., Художник РСФСР, 1976. C.26.
- Выставка произведений ленинградских художников, посвящённая 60-летию Великого Октября. Л., Художник РСФСР, 1982. С.19.
- Зональная выставка произведений ленинградских художников 1980 года. Каталог. Л., Художник РСФСР, 1983. C.19-20.
- Левандовский С. Живопись на Ленинградской зональной // Искусство. 1981, № 2. С.63.
- Справочник членов Ленинградской организации Союза художников РСФСР. Л., Художник РСФСР, 1987. C.100.
- Peinture Russe. Catalogue. Paris, Drouot Richelieu, 24 Septembre 1991. P.63.
- Связь времён. 1932—1997. Художники — члены Санкт — Петербургского Союза художников России. Каталог выставки. СПб., ЦВЗ «Манеж», 1997. С.295.
- Иванов С. В. Неизвестный соцреализм. Ленинградская школа. СПб., НП-Принт, 2007. С.366, 387, 391, 395. ISBN 5-901724-21-6, ISBN 978-5-901724-21-7.
- Юбилейный Справочник выпускников Санкт-Петербургского академического института живописи, скульптуры и архитектуры имени И. Е. Репина Российской Академии художеств. 1915—2005. СПб., «Первоцвет», 2007. С.58.
