= Lev Chegorovsky =

Russian painter (1914–1991)

- Лев Чегоровский
- Born: 20 February 1914; Saint Petersburg, Russian Empire
- Died: 21 October 1991 (aged 77); Leningrad, USSR
- Education: Repin Institute of Arts
- Known for: Painting
- Movement: Realism

Lev Ilych Chegorovsky (Russian: Лев Ильич Чегоровский; 20 February 1914 – 21 October 1991) was a Soviet Russian painter and art teacher, a member of the Leningrad Union of Artists, who lived and worked in Leningrad. Lev Chegorovsky regarded as one of representatives of the Leningrad school of painting, most famous for his portrait and historical paintings.

== See also ==
- Leningrad School of Painting
- List of 20th-century Russian painters
- List of painters of Saint Petersburg Union of Artists
- Saint Petersburg Union of Artists

== Sources ==
- Осенняя выставка произведений ленинградских художников 1958 года. Каталог. Л., Художник РСФСР, 1959. С.29.
- Ленинград. Зональная выставка. Л., Художник РСФСР, 1965. С.61.
- Аникушин М. Солнце на полотнах // Ленинградская правда, 1964, 3 ноября.
- Колесова О. Две тысячи встреч. На выставке «Ленинград» // Ленинградская правда, 1964, 4 ноября.
- Буткевич О. От находок к открытиям. Заметки с выставки «Ленинград» // Советская культура, 1964, 26 декабря.
- Вторая республиканская художественная выставка «Советская Россия». Каталог. — М: Советский художник, 1965. — с.43.
- Наш современник. Зональная выставка произведений ленинградских художников 1975 года. Каталог. — Л: Художник РСФСР, 1980. — с.28.
- Изобразительное искусство Ленинграда. Каталог выставки. — Л: Художник РСФСР, 1976. — с.34.
- Осенняя выставка произведений ленинградских художников. 1978 года. Каталог. — Л: Художник РСФСР, 1983. — с.18.
- Зональная выставка произведений ленинградских художников 1980 года. Каталог. — Л: Художник РСФСР, 1983. — с.26.
- Леняшин В. Поиски художественной правды // Художник. 1981, № 1. С.8-17.
- Левандовский С. Живопись на Ленинградской зональной // Искусство. 1981, № 2. С.60.
- Вьюнова И. Высшая ценность - человек // Художник. 1981, № 1. С.18-23.
- Справочник членов Ленинградской организации Союза художников РСФСР. — Л: Художник РСФСР, 1987. — с.143.
- 40 лет Великой победы. Выставка произведений художников — ветеранов Великой Отечественной войны. Каталог. — Л: Художник РСФСР, 1990. — с.15.
- Matthew Cullerne Bown. A Dictionary of Twentieth Century Russian And Soviet Painters. 1900 — 1980s. — London: Izomar Limited, 1998.
- Sergei V. Ivanov. Unknown Socialist Realism. The Leningrad School. Saint Petersburg, NP-Print Edition, 2007. P.360, 392, 402. ISBN 5-901724-21-6, ISBN 978-5-901724-21-7.
- Юбилейный Справочник выпускников Санкт-Петербургского академического института живописи, скульптуры и архитектуры имени И. Е. Репина Российской Академии художеств. 1915—2005. СПб., "Первоцвет", 2007. С.60.
