= Yelena Zhukova =

Russian artist (1906–1991)

- Born: Yelena Pavlovna Zhukova; 5 June 1906; Saint Petersburg, Russian Empire
- Died: 31 October 1991 (aged 85); Leningrad, Soviet Union
- Education: Tavricheskaya Art School
- Known for: Painting
- Movement: Realism

Yelena Pavlovna Zhukova (Russian: Елена Павловна Жукова; 5 June 1906 – 31 October 1991) was a Soviet and Russian painter, a member of the Leningrad Union of Artists, who lived and worked in Leningrad. She was regarded as one of representatives of the Leningrad School of Painting, most famous for her landscape paintings and portraits of various Russian artists such as Kuzma Petrov-Vodkin (early 1930s), Yaroslav Nikolaev (1945) and Mikhail Nesterov (1936).

== See also ==
- Fine Art of Leningrad
- Leningrad School of Painting
- List of 20th-century Russian painters
- List of painters of Saint Petersburg Union of Artists
- Saint Petersburg Union of Artists

== Sources ==
- Выставка произведений ленинградских художников 1961 года. Каталог. Л., Художник РСФСР, 1964. С.18.
- Художники народов СССР. Биобиблиографический словарь. Т.4. Кн.1. М., Искусство, 1983. С.145.
- Справочник членов Ленинградской организации Союза художников РСФСР. Л., Художник РСФСР, 1987. С.45.
