= Soviet Russia (Exhibition, 1967) =

1967 art exhibition in Moscow, Russia

Coordinates: 55.7535°N 37.6122°E

Third National Art Exhibition "Soviet Russia". Catalog
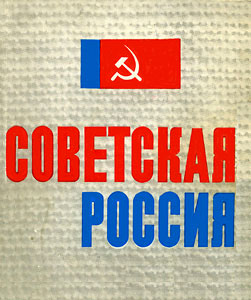
- Year: 1967
- Location: Manezh Exhibition Hall; Moscow

Third National Art Exhibition "Soviet Russia" (Moscow, 1967) (Russian: Третья Республиканская художественная выставка "Советская Россия" 1967 года) became a main national art event of 1967, as well as one of the largest Soviet art exhibitions of the 1960s. The exhibition took place in Manezh Exhibition Hall.

== History and organization ==
The exhibition opened on 20 September 1967 in Moscow Manege. Organization and preparation of the Second National Art Exhibition "Soviet Russia" engaged a specially formed Exhibition Committee in the amount of 83 most authoritative experts in the field of fine arts under head of Vladimir Serov. It published a catalog of the exhibition. In total, the Exhibition displayed over 2,000 works of art of painters, sculptors, graphics, masters of arts and crafts, artists of theater and cinema. Many of art works have been purchased for the largest Soviet art museums, including the Russian Museum, the Tretyakov Gallery, and others. After the Exhibition in Moscow there were organized traveling exhibitions, which have been shown in major cities of the Russian Federation.

== Contributing artists ==
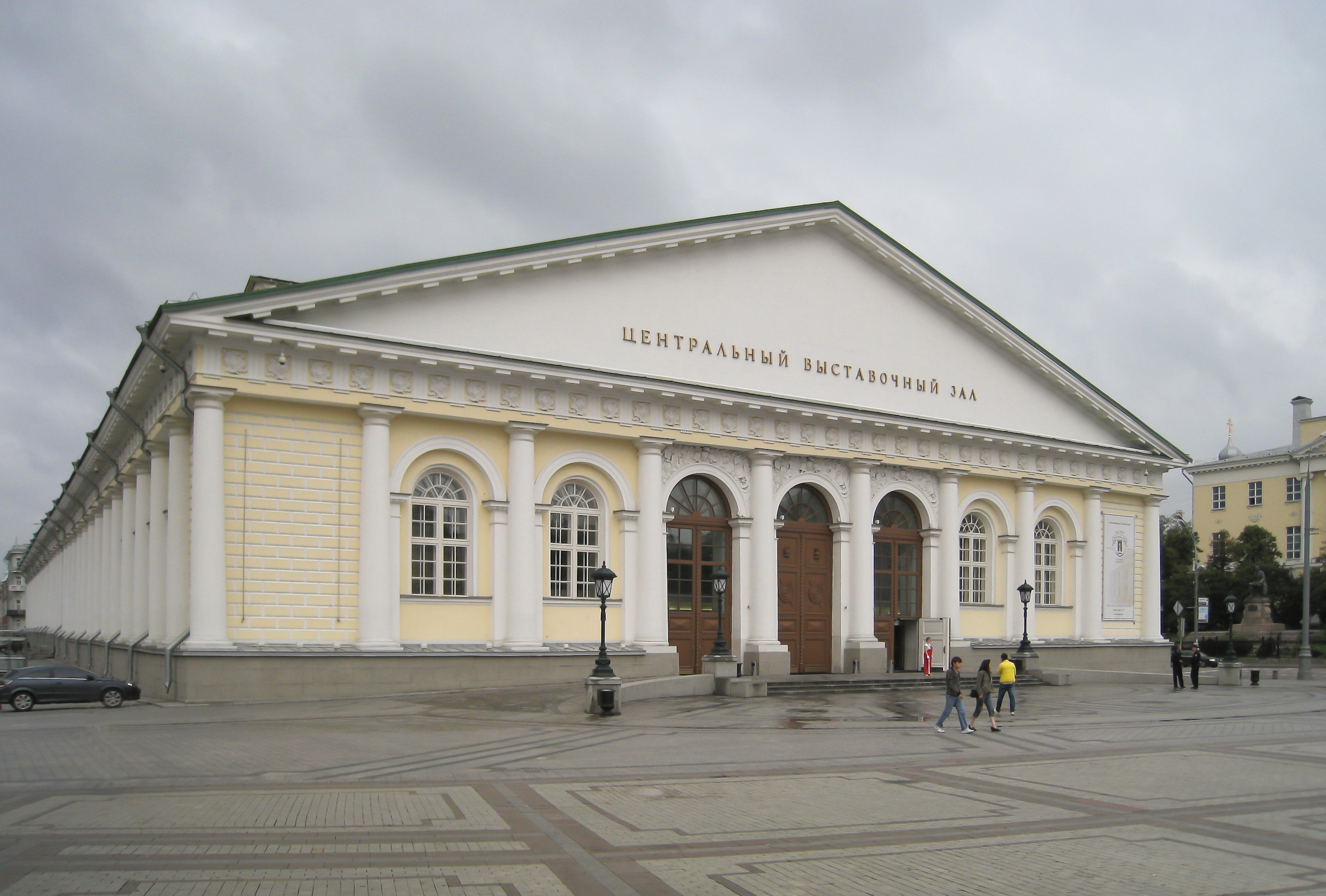
Moscow Manezh Exhibition Hall. 2008

In the largest Department of Painting were exhibited over 640 art works of the important painters. There were Nikolai Baskakov, Dmitry Belyaev, Olga Bogaevskaya, Veniamin Borisov, Dmitry Buchkin, Nikolai Galakhov, Aleksei Gritsai, Aleksandr Deyneka, Vasily Yefanov, Alexei Eriomin, Boris Ioganson, Mikhail Kaneev, Yuri Khukhrov, Maya Kopitseva, Boris Korneev, Victor Korovin, Gely Korzhev, Nikolai Kostrov, Engels Kozlov, Marina Kozlovskaya, Yaroslav Krestovsky, Kukryniksy, Boris Lavrenko, Anatoli Levitin, Oleg Lomakin, Vladimir Malevsky, Eugene Maltsev, Boris Maluev, Evsey Moiseenko, Andrei Mylnikov, Dmitriy Nalbandyan, Vera Nazina, Samuil Nevelshtein, Yuri Neprintsev, Yaroslav Nikolaev, Dmitry Oboznenko, Victor Oreshnikov, Sergei Osipov, Lia Ostrova, Vyacheslav Ovchinnikov, Vladimir Ovchinnikov, Genrikh Pavlovsky, Varlen Pen, Nikolai Pozdneev, Stepan Privedentsev, Ivan Savenko, Gleb Savinov, Alexander Samokhvalov, Boris Shamanov, Alexander Sokolov, Victor Teterin, Nikolai Timkov, Mikhail Trufanov, Yuri Tulin, Vitaly Tulenev, Ivan Varichev, Igor Veselkin, Vecheslav Zagonek, Alexander Zaytsev, and many others most prominent painters of the Russian Federation. Over 2000 art works were exhibited.

In the Department of Sculptures were exhibited 364 art works by over 150 authors including Mikhail Anikushin, Lev Kerbel, Alexander Kibalnikov, Sergei Konenkov, Nikolai Tomsky, Yevgeny Vuchetich, and many others most prominent sculptors of the Russian Federation.

In the Department of Graphic were exhibited 840 art works by most prominent graphic artists of the Russian Federation.

== Contributed artworks ==
For display at the Exhibition were selected art works created in 1966-1967, as well as some earlier works. Many of them were previously shown at the city and regional Art Exhibitions and were subsequently found in the collections of Soviet Art museums, as well as domestic and foreign galleries and collectors.

Historical genre was represented by the works of "Before the assault" by Nikolai Baskakov, "Terrible the 1941 year" by Dmitry Belyaev, "Sentinels Revolution" by Dmitry Buchkin, "To Lenin" by Alexei Eriomin, "Lenin" by Lev Kerbel, "Lenin's Speech at the Obukhov Plant" by Yuri Khukhrov and Vyacheslav Ovchinnikov, "In steppes near Kherson" by Boris Korneev, "Barrier", "Seeing off" by Gely Korzhev, "The Prosecution (War criminals on the Nuremberg trials)" by Kukryniksy, "Roads of War" by Boris Lavrenko, "Unconquered" by Oleg Lomakin, "Year of 1905" by Vladimir Malevsky, "Native land", "The Leningrad in summer of 1942", "August 8, 1943", "Baltic sailors" by Yuri Neprintsev, "Summer of 1941 year" by Dmitry Oboznenko, "Bolshevist underground eve of the October Revolution" by Victor Oreshnikov, "Revolutionary days in Petrograd" by Stepan Privedentsev, "Barricade on Presnia" by Gleb Savinov, "Enemies" by Alexander Sokolov, "A Victory! Berlin, 1945" by Vasily Sokolov, "Karl Marx", "Portrait of Sergei Kirov", "Portrait of Vladimir Lenin" by Nikolai Tomsky, "The Front of here" by Mikhail Trufanov, "The Sorrowful news. January 21, 1924", "In Anticipation" by Yuri Tulin, "We construct a new world" by Vecheslav Zagonek, and some others.

Portrait genre was represented by the works of "Anton Chekhov" by Mikhail Anikushin, "Yuri Gagarin", "Valentina Tereshkova" by Lev Kerbel, "Portrait of collective farmer Natasha Sporova", "Portrait of farm worker Zinaida Zhavoronkova" by Yuri Khukhrov, "Portrait of Dmitry Kursky, a first People's Commissar of Justice" by Sergey Konenkov, "Woman-Partisan" by Boris Maluev, "Natasha" by Evsey Moiseenko, "Composer Sergei Prokofiev" by Lia Ostrova, "Portrait of Academician Nikitin" by Varlen Pen, "Sergei Yesenin with Mother" by Igor Veselkin, "Portrait of novelist Konstantin Fedin", "Portrait of Justas Paleckis" by Yevgeny Vuchetich, "Portrait of artist Aminodav Kanevsky", "Portrait of Matveev, director of the First Moscow Watch Factory" by Vasily Yefanov, and some others.

Genre painting was represented by the works of "Wedding" by Olga Bogaevskaya, "Forest masters" by Nikolai Galakhov, "Northern spring", "North jetty" by Alexei Eriomin, "At the Vitebsky railway station" by Mikhail Kaneev, "Rain has gone", "Bathing" by Maya Kopitseva, "The Gold of Arctic" by Boris Korneev, "A Mother", "Old wounds", "Traces of War" by Gely Korzhev, "Bread", "To the Miners" by Engels Kozlov, "By the fire", "Murmansk Sea Port" by Marina Kozlovskaya, "Magistral", "Siberian Builders", "Morning exercises" by Anatoli Levitin, "Rehearsal" by Oleg Lomakin, "Our time" by Eugene Maltsev, "Natives of the Volga River region" by Boris Maluev, "Mothers, Sisters", "Heralds", "Twain" by Evsey Moiseenko, "Sisters" by Andrei Mylnikov, "The Lesson of History" by Samuil Nevelshtein, "In memory of the fallen" by Yuri Neprintsev, "Holiday on the Neva River" by Yaroslav Nikolaev, "Haymaking Time" by Sergei Osipov, "On the eve of the fishing season" by Nikolai Pozdneev, "Appassionata", "Youth" by Alexander Samokhvalov, "Fisherwoman of Arctic" by Alexander Sokolov, "In a way" by Mikhail Trufanov, "Raftsman of the North" by Vitaly Tulenev, "Autumn. Harvesting potatoes", "Horses. The lunch hour" by Ivan Varichev, "Summer night", "Baltic Sea", "Flood on the Volkhov River" by Vecheslav Zagonek, "Toilers of the Sea" by Alexander Zaytsev, and some others.

Landscape and Cityscape was represented by the works of "Oryol" by Veniamin Borisov, "A Light-Blue Spring" by Kim Britov, "Spring time", "October. Towards evening", "Oats", "First water" by Aleksei Gritsai, "Kizhi", "At the Saint Isaac's Cathedral", "Pushkin Square in Leningrad" by Mikhail Kaneev, "Evening in the Fortress" by Victor Korovin, "White nights" by Yaroslav Krestovsky, "Willows" by Evsey Moiseenko, "Became warm", "Armenia. Sunny day" by Dmitriy Nalbandyan, "Our garden" by Vera Nazina, "White night", "A wind on the Neva River" by Yaroslav Nikolaev, "Staritsa town" by Sergei Osipov, "Summer in countryside", "Indian Summer" by Vladimir Ovchinnikov, "Ural", "Kama River in Autumn", "A Spring Day", "Silver day" by Ivan Savenko, "Evening in a village" by Boris Shamanov, "A First snow" by Vasily Sokolov, "Oredezh River", "Last days of the summer" by Victor Teterin, "A Spring", "The Beginning of Autumn", "Volkhov River. The Last snow", "Autumn Gold", "At the Dam", "A First days of May", "Autumn time" by Nikolai Timkov, "Downpour", "Warm evening" by Vitaly Tulenev, "Early spring" by Ivan Varichev, "Rainy day" by Vecheslav Zagonek, and some others.

Still life paintings was represented by the works of "Roses", "Rose and Fruits" by Vladimir Gremytskikh, "Spring flowers", "Lilies of the valley", "A Rose" by Dmitry Mitrohin, "Cucumbers", "Russian edibles" by Genrikh Pavlovsky, "Still life with fish", "Still life with apples" by Vasily Sokolov, "Bratina and garlic" by Vladimir Stozharov, "Flowers of May" by Elena Tabakova, "Still life under the apple tree" by Victor Teterin, and some others.

== Acknowledgment ==
Third National Art Exhibition "Soviet Russia" were widely covered in the press and literature on Soviet fine art.

== See also ==
- Fine Art of Leningrad
- Leningrad School of Painting
- Soviet art
- 1967 in fine arts of the Soviet Union
- Saint Petersburg Union of Artists
- Socialist realism

== Sources ==
- Третья Республиканская художественная выставка «Советская Россия». Каталог. М., МК РСФСР, 1967.
- Смена, 1967, 14 октября.
- Аникушин М. О времени и о себе // Вечерний Ленинград, 1967, 17 октября.
- Справочник членов Ленинградской организации Союза художников РСФСР. Л., Художник РСФСР, 1980.
- Художники народов СССР. Биобиблиографический словарь. Т.1-4. М., Искусство, 1970-1995.
- Справочник членов Союза художников СССР. Том 1,2. М., Советский художник, 1979.
- А. Каганович. Андрей Андреевич Мыльников. Л., Художник РСФСР, 1980, 86-87.
- Леняшин В. А. Художников друг и советник. Современная живопись и проблемы критики. Л., Художник РСФСР, 1985. С.60.
- Дмитренко А. Зональные (региональные) и республиканские выставки в художественной жизни России 1960-1980-х годов // Время перемен. Искусство 1960—1985 в Советском Союзе. СПб., Государственный Русский музей, 2006. С.31-33. ISBN 5-93332-199-0.
- Time for Change. The Art of 1960-1985 in the Soviet Union. Saint Petersburg, State Russian Museum, 2006. P.376.
- Sergei V. Ivanov. Unknown Socialist Realism. The Leningrad School. Saint Petersburg: NP-Print Edition, 2007. P.395. ISBN 5-901724-21-6, ISBN 978-5-901724-21-7
- Юбилейный Справочник выпускников Санкт-Петербургского академического института живописи, скульптуры и архитектуры имени И. Е. Репина Российской Академии художеств. 1915—2005. СПб., «Первоцвет», 2007.
