= Spring exhibition (Leningrad, 1955) =

Soviet art exhibition

A Boy and a Sea
- Artist: Lev Russov
- Year: 1955
- Location: private collection; Russia

Spring Fine Art Exhibition of Leningrad artists (Leningrad, 1955) (Russian: Весенняя выставка произведений ленинградских художников 1955 года) became one of the important Soviet Art Exhibitions of 1955 and of the mid-1950s as a whole. The Exhibition took place in Leningrad Union of Soviet Artists Exhibition Halls on Bolshaya Morskaya st. 38.

== History and Organization ==
The exhibition opened on 7 July. The Department of Art and Crafts has been opened on 10 June. The organization and preparation of the exhibition was handled by a specially formed Exhibition Committee which consisted of 23 of the most authoritative art-experts headed by Yaroslav Nikolaev. It published Catalog of the exhibition. In total, almost 630 works of art from 192 painters, sculptors, graphic artists, masters of art and crafts were exhibited.

== Contributing Artists ==
In the largest Department of Painting were exhibited art works of 91 authors. There were Evgenia Antipova, Irina Baldina, Leonid Baykov, Dmitry Buchkin, Vladimir Gorb, Alexei Eriomin, Maya Kopitseva, Gevork Kotiantz, Boris Lavrenko, Ivan Lavsky, Dmitry Maevsky, Gavriil Malish, Nikolai Mukho, Lev Orekhov, Sergei Osipov, Filaret Pakun, Genrikh Pavlovsky, Varlen Pen, Lev Russov, Ivan Savenko, Alexander Semionov, Arseny Semionov, Yuri Shablikin, Alexander Shmidt, Elena Skuin, Nikolai Timkov, Leonid Tkachenko, Yuri Tulin, Boris Ugarov, Piotr Vasiliev, Vecheslav Zagonek, Ruben Zakharian, Elena Zhukova, and others most prominent painters of the Leningrad School.

In the Department of Sculptures were exhibited art works of 13 sculptors. Department of graphics presented a creation of 37 artists. There were Evgenia Antipova, Anatoli Kaplan, Anna Kostrova, Alexei Pakhomov, Varlen Pen, Alexander Vedernikov, Georgy Vereysky, Vasily Zvontsov, and others.

== Contributed Artworks ==
For the Exhibition were selected art works created in 1954–1955 years. They were exhibited in the first time. Some of them were subsequently found in the collections of Soviet Art museums, as well as domestic and foreign galleries and collectors.

Genre painting was presented of "Tugboat at the bunker" by Leonid Baykov, "In Novosibirsk" by Alexei Eriomin, "Pier on the Volga" by Piotr Fomin, "Pyongyang in the August", "In the Old Pyongyang", "Rainy day in Pyongyang", "Korean artists" by Varlen Pen, "At the Sea" by Lev Russov, "Herzen street", "Stalin Avenue", "Neva River embankment", "Narva Triumphal Arch" by Arseny Semionov, "On plein air" by Elena Skuin, "A First Line of the Vasilievsky Island", "May Day on Vasilievsky Island", "Teatralnaya Square" by Leonid Tkachenko, "Rally at the monument to the victims of Bloody Sunday" by Yuri Tulin, "In the Collective Farm. 1929 Year", "Street", "In the yard" by Boris Ugarov, "Nevsky Prospekt in winter" by Vasily Vikulov, and some others.

Portrait was presented of "Natasha" by Irina Baldina, "Portrait of chemist Monastyrsky" by Solomon Epshtein, "Old Man in White dress", "Korean Old Man in winter dress", "A Head of Korean girl", "Grandfather of Kim Il Sung", "Interpreter - Chinese girl" by Varlen Pen, "Portrait of artist Kremer" by Lev Russov, "Portrait of Lena" by Yuri Tulin, "Portrait of artist Veniamin Kremer" by Lev Russov, "Self-Portrait" by Gleb Verner, and some others.

Landscape, Seascape and Cityscape were presented of "Gurzuf in the morning", "A Sea in Gurzuf", "A Sea" by Evgenia Antipova, "The road to the Oyash River", "Siberia", "Cottages" by Irina Baldina, "October in Zaonejie", "In Podporozhye" by Leonid Baykov, "Spring", "Etude" by Dmitry Buchkin, "On Ural", "Northern village", "In Siberian taiga", "Near the Moscow", "Kizhi", "Northern etude", "On the Ob River" by Alexei Eriomin, "Warm day in Pargolovo", "Becoming Clear" by Ivan Lavsky, "Thawed patches" by Dmitry Maevsky, "Grain harvested" by Gavriil Malish, "Etude" by Nikolai Mukho, "Courtyard in winter", "Courtyard in the Tula" by Lev Orekhov, "Spring", "Young pine-trees", "Spring flood", "Spring evening", "The Collective farm mill" by Sergei Osipov, "Before the rain", "Cold day", "The Lake" by Filaret Pakun, "Nonfreezing river" by Genrikh Pavlovsky, "In Winter" by Ivan Savenko, "Altai. Shebalino area", "Altai. On the bank of the Katun River" by Alexander Semionov, "Spring landscape", "Landscape with bridge", "Early spring" by Arseny Semionov, "Gray day on Griboyedov Canal" by Alexander Shmidt, "Spring landscape", "Silent fall on the Don River", "Last snow", "Toward spring" by Nikolai Timkov, "Sunset rays" by Leonid Tkachenko, "A Boat" by Yuri Tulin, "April", "Creek", "Small bridge", "Last snow" by Boris Ugarov, "Komarovo settlement" by Piotr Vasiliev, "Tuchkov embankment", "Yacht-club" by Alexander Vedernikov, "Teskey Ala-Too", "Mountain River", "October", "Fishermen of Issyk Kul" by Vecheslav Zagonek, "Gurzuf" by Ruben Zakharian, "Gurzuf" by Elena Zhukova, and some others.

Still life paintings were presented of "Roses", "Yellow marigolds" by Vladimir Gorb, "Flowers on the window" by Maya Kopitseva, "Still life" by Gevork Kotiantz, "Still life" by Genrikh Pavlovsky, "Still life" by Elena Skuin, and some others.

== Acknowledgment ==
The Spring Exhibition of the Leningrad artists of 1955 was widely covered in press and in literature on Soviet fine art.

== See also ==
- Fine Art of Leningrad
- Leningrad School of Painting
- 1955 in fine arts of the Soviet Union
- Saint Petersburg Union of Artists
- Socialist realism

== Sources ==
- Весенняя выставка произведений ленинградских художников. 1955 год. Каталог. Л., ЛОСХ, 1956.
- Выставки советского изобразительного искусства. Справочник. Т.5. 1954—1958 годы. М., Советский художник, 1981. C.142-143.
- Справочник членов Ленинградской организации Союза художников РСФСР. Л., Художник РСФСР, 1980.
- Художники народов СССР. Биографический словарь. Т.1-4. М., Искусство, 1970-1995.
- Справочник членов Союза художников СССР. Т.1,2. М., Советский художник, 1979.
- Sergei V. Ivanov. Unknown Socialist Realism. The Leningrad School. Saint Petersburg, NP-Print Edition, 2007. P.390, 414, 441. ISBN 5-901724-21-6, ISBN 978-5-901724-21-7
- Юбилейный Справочник выпускников Санкт-Петербургского академического института живописи, скульптуры и архитектуры имени И.Е.Репина Российской Академии художеств. 1915—2005. СПб., Первоцвет, 2007.
