= Leningrad painting of 1950–1980s (Saint Petersburg, 1994) =

1994 Soviet art Exhibition in Saint Petersburg

Fine Art Exhibition ″Leningrad painting of 1950–1980s″
- Artist: Spring Day, 1959, Nikolai Pozdneev (1930-1978)
- Year: 1959
- Location: private collection; Russia

Retrospective Exhibition "Leningrad painting of 1950–1980s" (Russian: Ленинградские художники. Живопись 1950–1980-х годов) became one of the most notable event in the Saint Petersburg exhibition live of 1994. The Exhibition took place in Exhibition Centre of Saint Petersburg Union of Artists, located in the historical building on Bolshaya Morskaya st., 38. There were exhibited 83 art works from private collections of 43 important masters of the Leningrad School of Painting.

== History and Organization ==
Exhibition was opened on March 31, and worked up to April 16, 1994. Catalog was published.

== Contributing Artists ==
There were exhibited art works of 43 painters of the Leningrad School: Taisia Afonina, Piotr Alberti, Irina Baldina, Vsevolod Bazhenov, Piotr Belousov, Yuri Belov, Veniamin Borisov, Piotr Buchkin, Vladimir Chekalov, Evgeny Chuprun, Nikolai Galakhov, Irina Dobrekova, Alexei Eriomin, Yuri Khukhrov, Maya Kopitseva, Boris Korneev, Alexander Koroviakov, Marina Kozlovskaya, Boris Lavrenko, Piotr Litvinsky, Dmitry Maevsky, Vladimir Malevsky, Nikolai Mukho, Mikhail Natarevich, Alexander Naumov, Piotr Nazarov, Anatoli Nenartovich, Yuri Neprintsev, Samuil Nevelshtein, Dmitry Oboznenko, Sergei Osipov, Vladimir Ovchinnikov, Victor Otiev, Nikolai Pozdneev, Evgeny Pozdniakov, Galina Rumiantseva, Kapitolina Rumiantseva, Lev Russov, Alexander Samokhvalov, Alexander Semionov, Nadezhda Shteinmiller, Elena Skuin, Nikolai Timkov, Mikhail Tkachev, Leonid Tkachenko, Anatoli Vasiliev, Piotr Vasiliev, Nina Veselova, Rostislav Vovkushevsky, Vecheslav Zagonek.

== Contributed Artworks ==
For the Exhibition were selected art works created in 1950-1980s. Some of them were exhibited before, some paintings were shown in the first time. In general, the exhibition presented as works of famous masters of this genre, and the direction of development of Soviet painting in the works by Leningrad artists of the middle - second half of the twentieth century.

Genre painting was represented by the works of "Cafe Gurzuf" by Alexander Samokhvalov, "In the Baikal Lake fishermen" by Vsevolod Bazhenov, "Youth" by Mikhail Natarevich, "Asphalting" by Anatoli Nenartovich"Rain has passed" by Vladimir Ovchinnikov, "Sunny Day" by Nadezhda Shteinmiller, "May Day on the Vasilievsky Island" by Leonid Tkachenko, "Baikal Boat Station" by Anatoli Vasiliev, and some others.

Portrait painting was represented by the works of "Portrait of Young Woman (T. Myasoedova)" by Piotr Belousov, "Portrait of sculptor Igor Krestovsky" by Piotr Buchkin, "Junior Sergeant" by Vladimir Chekalov, "Portrait of Sergei Ivanov" by Yuri Khukhrov, "Girl with red ribbon" by Samuil Nevelshtein, "Portrait of artist Igor Skorobogatov" by Lev Russov, and some others.

Landscape and Cityscape painting was represented by the works of "Arabian Coast" by Vsevolod Bazhenov, "March on the Neva River" and "Be a full wind" by Evgeny Chuprun, "On the Volga River" by Nikolai Galakhov, "On the riverside" by Alexei Eriomin, "Fortress in Old Ladoga" by Marina Kozlovskaya, "Spring in the City" by Piotr Litvinsky, "Bridge under Construction" by Nikolai Mukho, "Samarkhand. Registan" by Alexander Naumov, "House with Arch" and "Early Green" by Sergei Osipov, "Spring is coming" and "Little street in Pristanoe village" by Vladimir Ovchinnikov, "Malaya Sadovaya street" by Alexander Semionov, "Boats on the Neva River" by Nadezhda Shteinmiller, "Evening on the Volga River" by Nikolai Timkov, and some others.

Still life painting was represented by the works of "Still life with a Palette" by Piotr Alberti, "Still life with Pussy-Willows" by Taisia Afonina, "Guests are gone" by Yuri Belov, "Autumn still life" by Piotr Litvinsky, "Peonies" by Vladimir Malevsky, "Roses" by Samuil Nevelshtein, "Still life in the Grass" by Nikolai Pozdneev, "Still life with a Book" by Piotr Vasiliev, "Still Life with Lemon" by Rostislav Vovkushevsky, and some others.

== Acknowledgment ==
The Exhibition was reviewed in press and in literature devoted to Soviet fine art.

== See also ==
- Fine Art of Leningrad
- Spring Day (painting)
- Cafe Gurzuf (painting)
- Still life with Pussy-Willows (painting)
- Malaya Sadovaya (painting)
- Leningrad School of Painting
- Saint Petersburg Union of Artists
- Socialist realism

== Sources ==
- Ленинградские художники. Живопись 1950-1980 годов. Каталог. СПб., Выставочный центр Санкт-Петербургского Союза художников, 1994.
- Справочник членов Ленинградской организации Союза художников РСФСР. Л., Художник РСФСР, 1987.
- Художники народов СССР. Биографический словарь. Т.1-4. М., Искусство, 1970-1995.
- Справочник членов Союза художников СССР. Том 1,2. М., Советский художник, 1979.
- Sergei V. Ivanov. Unknown Socialist Realism. The Leningrad School. Saint Petersburg: NP-Print Edition, 2007. P.404, 422. ISBN 5-901724-21-6, ISBN 978-5-901724-21-7
- Юбилейный справочник выпускников Санкт-Петербургского академического института живописи, скульптуры и архитектуры имени И. Е. Репина Российской Академии художеств. 1915—2005. СПб., Первоцвет, 2007.
