= Buchkin =

Buchkin (Russian: Бучкин) is a Russian surname. Notable people with the surname include:

- Dmitry Buchkin (1927–2024), Soviet and Russian painter
- Piotr Buchkin (1886–1965), Soviet and Russian painter, illustrator, and art teacher
