= 1967 in fine arts of the Soviet Union =

The Motherland Calls
- Artist: Yevgeny Vuchetich
- Year: 1967
- Location: Mamayev Kurgan; Volgograd

The year 1967 was marked by many events that left an imprint on the history of Soviet and Russian Fine Arts.

== Events ==
- The Exhibition of leningrad artists devoted to 50th Anniversary October revolution of 1917 was opened in the Russian museum. The participants were Evgenia Antipova, Zaven Arshakuny, Nikolai Baskakov, Olga Bogaevskaya, Irina Broydo, Valery Vatenin, Maria Dobrina, Alexei Eremin, Vecheslav Zagonek, Alexander Zaytsev, Leonid Kabachek, Anatoli Kazantsev, Engels Kozlov, Boris Korneev, Leonid Krevitsky, Vladislav Levant, Oleg Lomakin, Boris Maluev, Yevsey Moiseenko, Mikhail Natarevich, Samuil Nevelshtein, Victor Oreshnikov, Sergei Osipov, Nikolai Pozdneev, Alexander Romanychev, Gleb Savinov, Leonid Tkachenko, Boris Ugarov, and other important Leningrad artists.
- Exhibition of work by Evgenia Antipova was opened in the Leningrad Union of Artists.
- Exhibition of work by Victor Teterin was opened in the Leningrad Union of Artists.
- A Monument «Stone as a weapon of the proletariat» was unveiled in Moscow. Authors of the monument sculptor Ivan Shadr.

«Stone as a weapon of the proletariat»
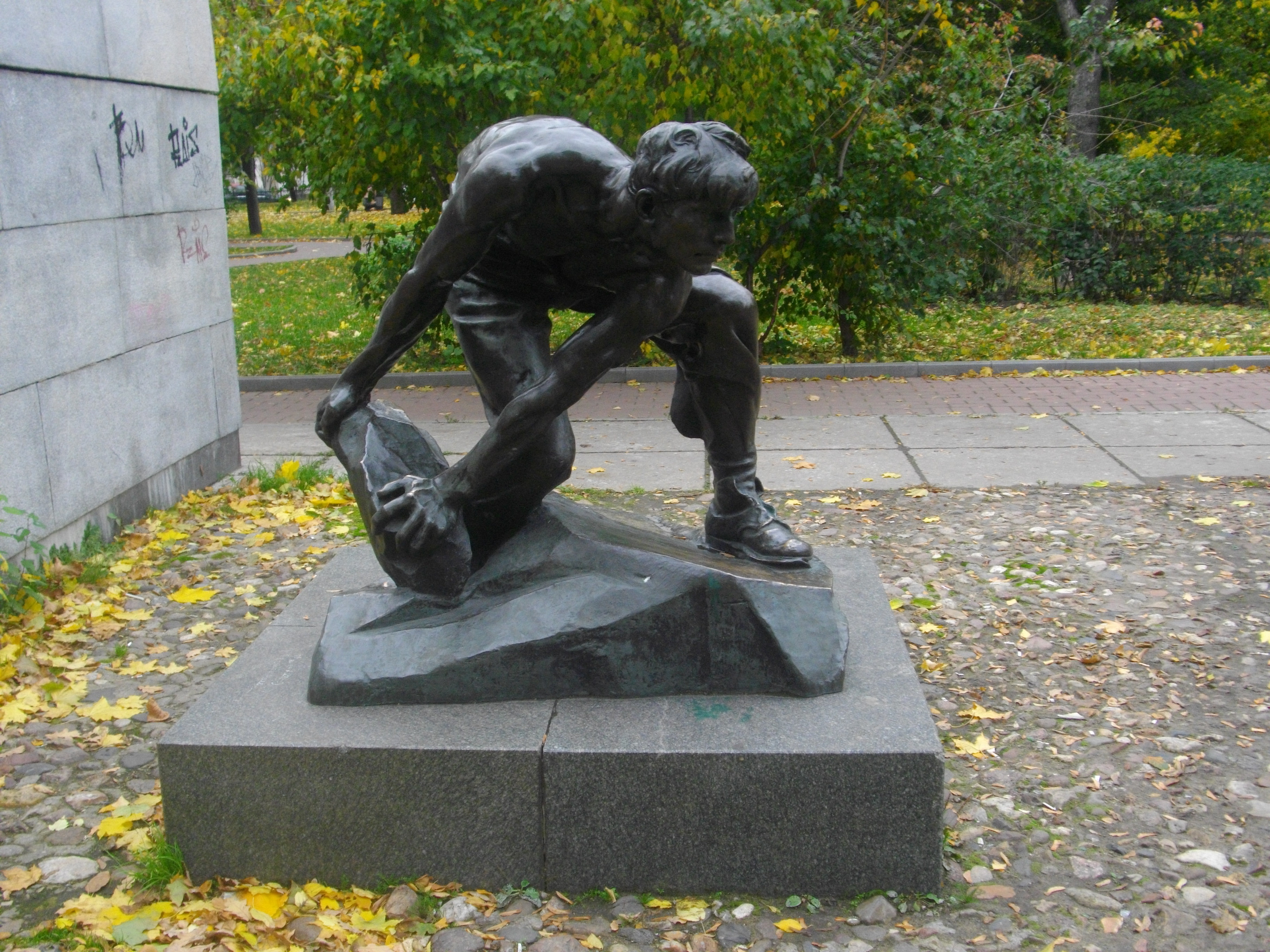
- Artist: Ivan Shadr
- Year: 1947
- Location: Moscow

- Exhibition of work by Vladimir Gorb was opened in the Leningrad Union of Artists.
- Exhibition of work by Lev Bogomolets was opened in the Leningrad Union of Artists.
- October 15 — A Monument «The Motherland Calls» (Russian: Родина-мать зовёт! Rodina Mat Zovyot!) was unveiled in Volgograd on the Mamayev Kurgan. Authors of the monument sculptor Yevgeny Vuchetich, architect Nikolai Nikitin.
- The Third National Fine Art Exhibition «Soviet Russia» was opened in Moscow. The participants were with Nikolai Baskakov, Olga Bogaevskaya, Veniamin Borisov, Nikolai Galakhov, Alexei Eriomin, Mikhail Kaneev, Yuri Khukhrov, Engels Kozlov, Marina Kozlovskaya, Maya Kopitseva, Boris Korneev, Nikolai Kostrov, Yaroslav Krestovsky, Boris Lavrenko, Oleg Lomakin, Evsey Moiseenko, Vera Nazina, Samuil Nevelshtein, Yuri Neprintsev, Dmitry Oboznenko, Sergei Osipov, Vladimir Ovchinnikov, Nikolai Pozdneev, Ivan Savenko, Gleb Savinov, Alexander Samokhvalov, Boris Shamanov, Alexander Sokolov, Victor Teterin, Nikolai Timkov, Mikhail Trufanov, Yuri Tulin, Vitaly Tulenev, Ivan Varichev, Igor Veselkin, Vecheslav Zagonek, and other important artists of Russian Federation Over 2000 works were exhibited.

== Deaths ==
- January 15 — David Burliuk (Russian: Бурлюк Давид Давидович), Russian avant-garde artists (born 1882).
- February 12 — Pavel Radimov (Russian: Радимов Павел Александрович), Russian soviet painter, the last leader of group Peredvizhniki and first head of AKhRR group (born 1887).
- March 7 — Sarra Lebedeva (Russian: Лебедева Сарра Дмитриевна), Russian soviet sculptor, Honored art worker of Russian Federation (born 1892).
- April 22 — Dmitry Filippov (Russian: Дмитрий Филиппович Филиппов), Russian soviet painter (born 1904).
- November 21 — Vladimir Lebedev (Russian: Лебедев Владимир Васильевич), Russian soviet painter and graphic artist, People′s Artist of the Russian Federation (born 1891).
- November 22 — Pavel Korin (Russian: Корин Павел Дмитриевич), Russian soviet painter, People's Artist of the USSR, Stalin Prize and Lenin Prize winner (born 1892).
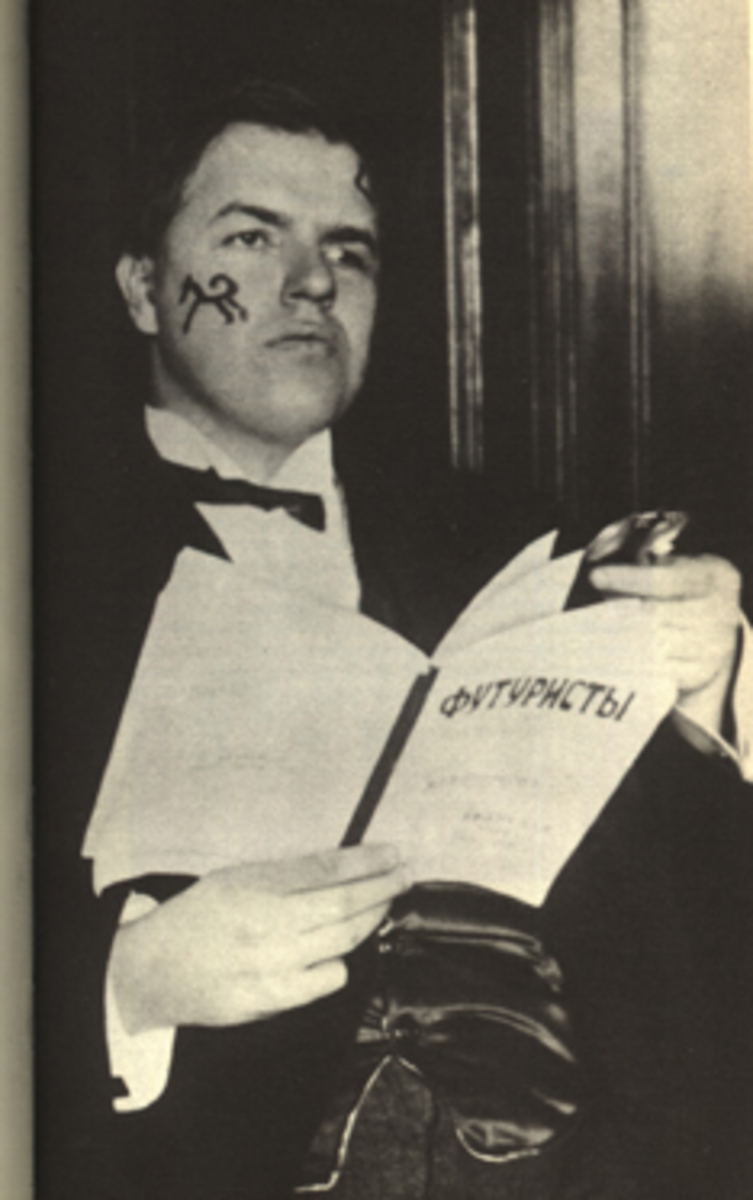
David Burliuk

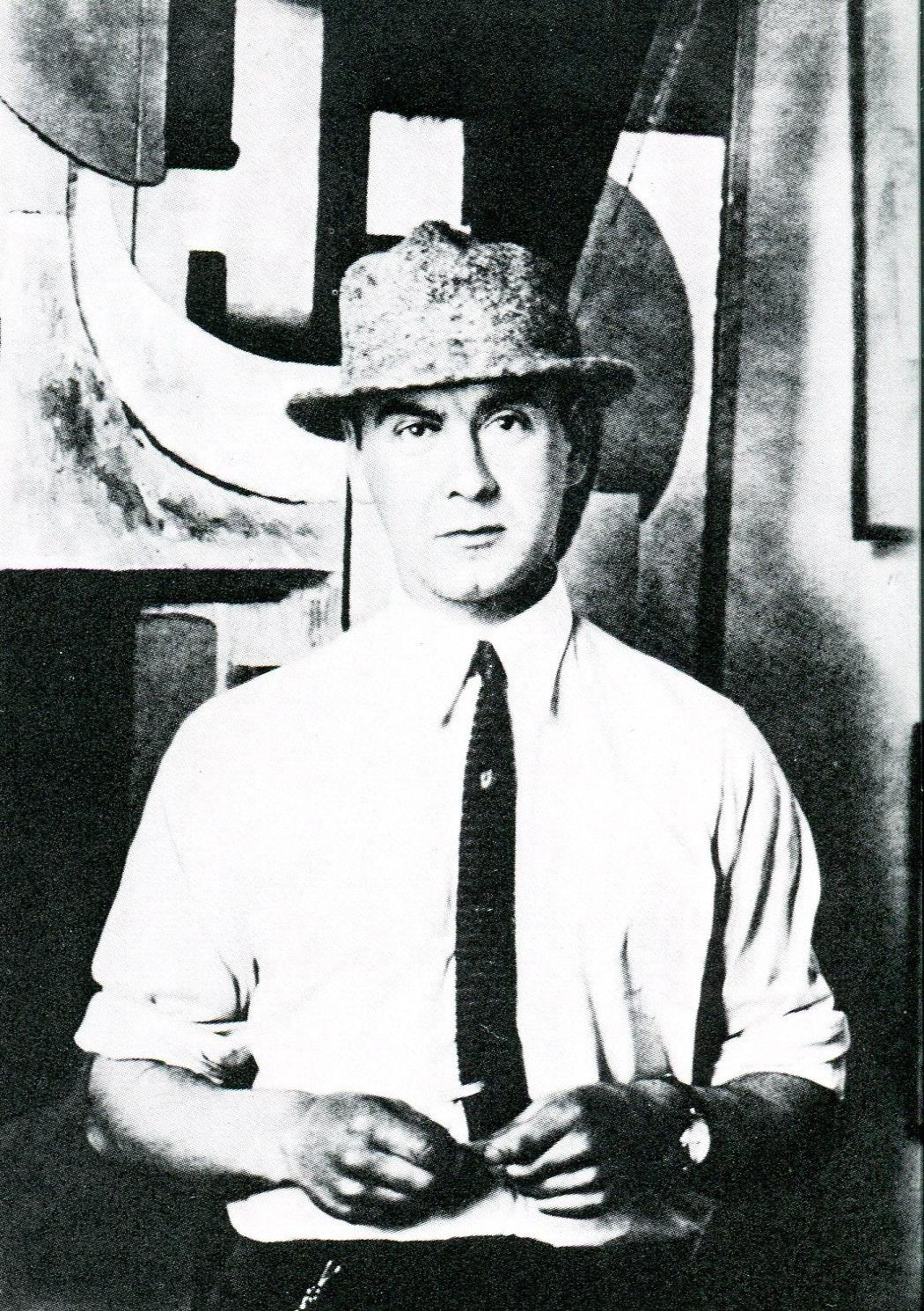
Vladimir Lebedev

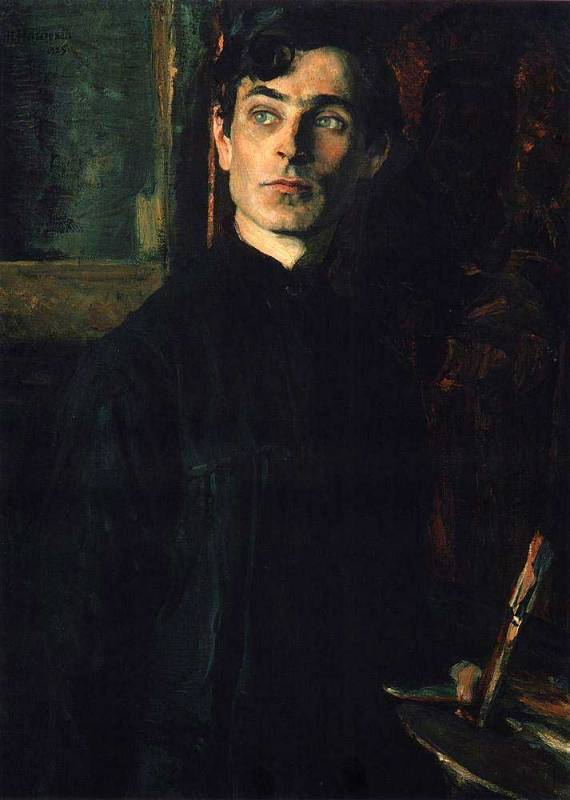
Pavel Korin by M.Nesterov

== See also ==
- List of Russian artists
- List of painters of Leningrad Union of Artists
- Saint Petersburg Union of Artists
- Russian culture

== Sources ==
- Смена, 1967, 14 октября.
- Аникушин М. О времени и о себе // Вечерний Ленинград, 1967, 17 октября.
- Смена, 1967, 17 октября.
- Дмитренко А. О времени, о человеке... // Смена, 1967, 11 ноября.
- Арбузов Г. История на полотнах // Ленинградская правда, 1967, 12 декабря.
- Зименко В. Юбилейная художественная // Правда, 1967, 17 декабря.
- Владимир Александрович Горб. Каталог выставки. Л., Художник РСФСР, 1967.
- Виктор Кузьмич Тетерин. Каталог выставки. Л., Художник РСФСР, 1967.
- Евгения Петровна Антипова. Каталог выставки. Л., Художник РСФСР, 1967.
- Третья Республиканская художественная выставка «Советская Россия». Каталог. М., Советский художник, 1967.
- Лев Константинович Богомолец. Каталог выставки. Л., Художник РСФСР, 1967.
- Artists of Peoples of the USSR. Biography Dictionary. Vol. 1. Moscow, Iskusstvo, 1970.
- Artists of Peoples of the USSR. Biography Dictionary. Vol. 2. Moscow, Iskusstvo, 1972.
- Directory of Members of Union of Artists of USSR. Volume 1,2. Moscow, Soviet Artist Edition, 1979.
- Directory of Members of the Leningrad branch of the Union of Artists of Russian Federation. Leningrad, Khudozhnik RSFSR, 1980.
- Artists of Peoples of the USSR. Biography Dictionary. Vol. 4 Book 1. Moscow, Iskusstvo, 1983.
- Directory of Members of the Leningrad branch of the Union of Artists of Russian Federation. - Leningrad: Khudozhnik RSFSR, 1987.
- Artists of peoples of the USSR. Biography Dictionary. Vol. 4 Book 2. - Saint Petersburg: Academic project humanitarian agency, 1995.
- Link of Times: 1932 - 1997. Artists - Members of Saint Petersburg Union of Artists of Russia. Exhibition catalogue. - Saint Petersburg: Manezh Central Exhibition Hall, 1997.
- Matthew C. Bown. Dictionary of 20th Century Russian and Soviet Painters 1900-1980s. London, Izomar, 1998.
- Vern G. Swanson. Soviet Impressionism. Woodbridge, England, Antique Collectors' Club, 2001.
- Время перемен. Искусство 1960—1985 в Советском Союзе. СПб., Государственный Русский музей, 2006.
- Sergei V. Ivanov. Unknown Socialist Realism. The Leningrad School. Saint-Petersburg, NP-Print Edition, 2007. ISBN 5-901724-21-6, ISBN 978-5-901724-21-7.
- Anniversary Directory graduates of Saint Petersburg State Academic Institute of Painting, Sculpture, and Architecture named after Ilya Repin, Russian Academy of Arts. 1915 - 2005. Saint Petersburg: Pervotsvet Publishing House, 2007.
