= Russian Winter. Hoarfrost =

1969 painting by Nikolai Timkov

- Artist: Nikolai E. Timkov
- Year: 1969
- Type: Oil on board
- Dimensions: 100 cm × 150 cm (40 in × 60 in)
- Location: private collection; Russia

Russian Winter. Hoarfrost (Russian: Русская зима. Иней) is a painting made in 1969 by the Russian artist Nikolai Timkov (1912–1993). It depicts a winter view of Tver land, a picturesque corner near the Academic Dacha.

== History ==
Nikolai Efimovich Timkov (1912–1993)

In the artistic style of Nikolai Timkov, who was one of the Honored Artists of the Russian Federation and one of the leading representatives of the Leningrad School of Painting, this picture has a special place in the Russian artistic movement of the time. In the halls of Saint Petersburg Union of Artists opened in 1993, the author exhibited it in the center of the exposure. The painting shows the Msta River bank near the village of Valentinovka where Timkov lived and worked between 1960 and 1990, and where as noted by art historian Mark Etkind, it was a "primary landscape workshop" of Nikolai Timkov. Old poplars under the fluffy snow caps in the bluish frost passed as the epitome of beauty and grandeur of Russian nature. In the picture, perhaps for the first time so clearly and convincingly demonstrated new qualities in the artist's landscape painting – monumental imagery solutions, which arose after a trip a year earlier in the Urals Region, as well as a decorative spirit and intensity of color. The art historian Alexander Simuni in his article for the catalogue of the French exhibition of 1994 praises the painting as an example of the art of contemporary landscape painting.

The painting was exhibited for the first time in 1975 at the solo exhibition of works by Timkov in the Exhibition Halls of the Leningrad Union of Artists. The painting was reproduced in the exhibition catalog. In 1982 the painting was presented at the solo exhibition of Nikolai Timkov in the halls of the Moscow House of Artists at the Kuznetsk bridge, shown later in the Air Force Academy named after Yuri Gagarin, and in the famous Star City near Moscow. In 1994 the painting was displayed in Pont-Audemer, France, at the exhibition of works of masters of the Saint Petersburg Union of Artists. It was reproduced in the exhibition catalog.

In 2012 Russian Winter. Hoarfrost was exhibited in "Manezh" Central Exhibition Hall on Art Fair devoted to 80th Anniversary of Saint-Petersburg Union of Artists. The painting was reproduced in the exhibition catalog. In 2007 the painting was published among others by Timkov in the book Unknown Socialist Realism: The Leningrad School by Sergei V. Ivanov.

== See also ==
- Nikolai E. Timkov (1912—1993)
- 1969 in fine arts of the Soviet Union
- Leningrad School of Painting
- Academicheskaya Dacha
- 1969 in art

== Sources ==
- Exhibition of works by Nikolai Efimovich Timkov. Catalogue. - Leningrad: Khudozhnik RSFSR, 1975.
- Mark G. Etkind. Nikolai Efimovich Timkov. P.5. // Exhibition of works by Nikolai Efimovich Timkov. Catalogue. - Leningrad: Khudozhnik RSFSR, 1975.
- Directory of members of the Leningrad branch of Union of Artists of Russian Federation. Leningrad, Khudozhnik RSFSR, 1987. P.130.
- Alexander B. Simuni. The Art of Socialist realism. P. 8. // Saint-Pétersbourg - Pont-Audemer. Dessins, Gravures, Sculptures et Tableaux du XX siècle du fonds de L' Union des Artistes de Saint-Pétersbourg. Pont-Audemer, 1994.
- Saint-Pétersbourg - Pont-Audemer. Dessins, Gravures, Sculptures et Tableaux du XX siècle du fonds de L' Union des Artistes de Saint-Pétersbourg. Pont-Audemer, 1994. P.110.
- Akademichka. The Academic Dacha through the eyes of Nikolai Timkov. The Pushkin Group and the Timkov Collection, 1999.
- Ludmila N. Mitrokhina. My Timkov // St. Petersburg Art History notebook. Vol. 7. Saint-Petersburg, 2006. P.51-58.
- Nikolai Timkov. Russian Winter. 1969 // Sergei V. Ivanov. Unknown Socialist Realism. The Leningrad School. Saint Petersburg, NP-Print Edition, 2007. P.40-41. ISBN 5-901724-21-6, ISBN 978-5-901724-21-7.
- Тимков Н. Русская зима. Иней. 1969 // 80 Лет Санкт-Петербургскому Союзу художников. Юбилейная выставка. СПб., 2012. С.211.
