= All-Union art exhibition (Moscow, 1957) =

1954 Soviet art exhibition

Blast Furnace Men
- Artist: Mikhail P. Trufanov
- Year: 1954
- Location: Tretyakov gallery; Moscow

The All-Union Art Exhibition Dedicated to the 40th Anniversary of the Great October Socialist Revolution (Russian: Всесоюзная художественная выставка, посвящённая 40-летию Великой Октябрьской социалистической революции, romanized: Vsesoyuznaya khudozhestvennaya vystavka, posvyashchonnaya 40-letiyu Velikoy Oktyabr'skoy sotsialisticheskoy revolyutsii) was one of the largest art exhibitions in Soviet history. Exhibition took place in Manezh Exhibition Hall from November 5, 1957, to May 1958.

== History and Organization ==
The organization and preparation of the All-Union Exhibition engaged a specially formed Exhibition Committee, which consisted of the most authoritative art experts. It published an illustrated catalog of the exhibition. In addition to Manezh, the exposition has been deployed in other exhibition halls of Moscow: in the USSR Academy of Arts, in the House of Artists, in the Exhibition Hall of the Union of Artists of the USSR, and in other halls of the Soviet capital. In total, the Exhibition displayed more than 8,000 works of art, including more than 1,600 paintings, 700 sculptures, and 2,000 graphic works. The Exhibition was visited by over 1 million people. Many art works were purchased for the largest Soviet art museums, including the Russian Museum, the Tretyakov Gallery, and others. After the Exhibition in Moscow five traveling exhibitions were organized, which were shown in the capitals of the Union Republics and major cities. Ninety art works were presented at the World's Fair in Brussels, Belgium in the Soviet department in 1958.

== Contributing artists ==
A total of 2,142 artists of all Soviet republics took part in the Exhibition: painters, sculptors, graphics artists, masters of arts and crafts, and artists of theater and cinema; including Mikhail Anikushin, Dmitry Belyaev, Olga Bogaevskaya, Aleksandr Gerasimov, Sergey Gerasimov, Igor Grabar, Aleksei Gritsai, Alexander Deyneka, Alexei Eriomin, Boris Ioganson, Lev Kerbel, Pavel Korin, Vladimir Malevsky, Matvey Manizer, Evsey Moiseenko, Yuri Neprintsev, Andrey Mylnikov, Alexander Laktionov, Dmitriy Nalbandyan, Ernst Neizvestny, Arkady Plastov, Nikolai Timkov, Mikhail Trufanov, Yuri Tulin, Vsevolod Bazhenov, Piotr Belousov, Nikolai Galakhov, Oleg Eremeev, Maya Kopitseva, Boris Korneev, Engels Kozlov, Anatoli Levitin, Boris Lavrenko, Andrei Mylnikov, Dmitry Oboznenko, Victor Oreshnikov, Alexander Samokhvalov, Gleb Savinov, Alexander Semionov, Joseph Serebriany, Vladimir Serov, Mikhail Trufanov, Boris Ugarov, Nina Veselova, Yevgeny Vuchetich, Sergei Zakharov, and many other most prominent Soviet artists.

== Contributed Artworks ==
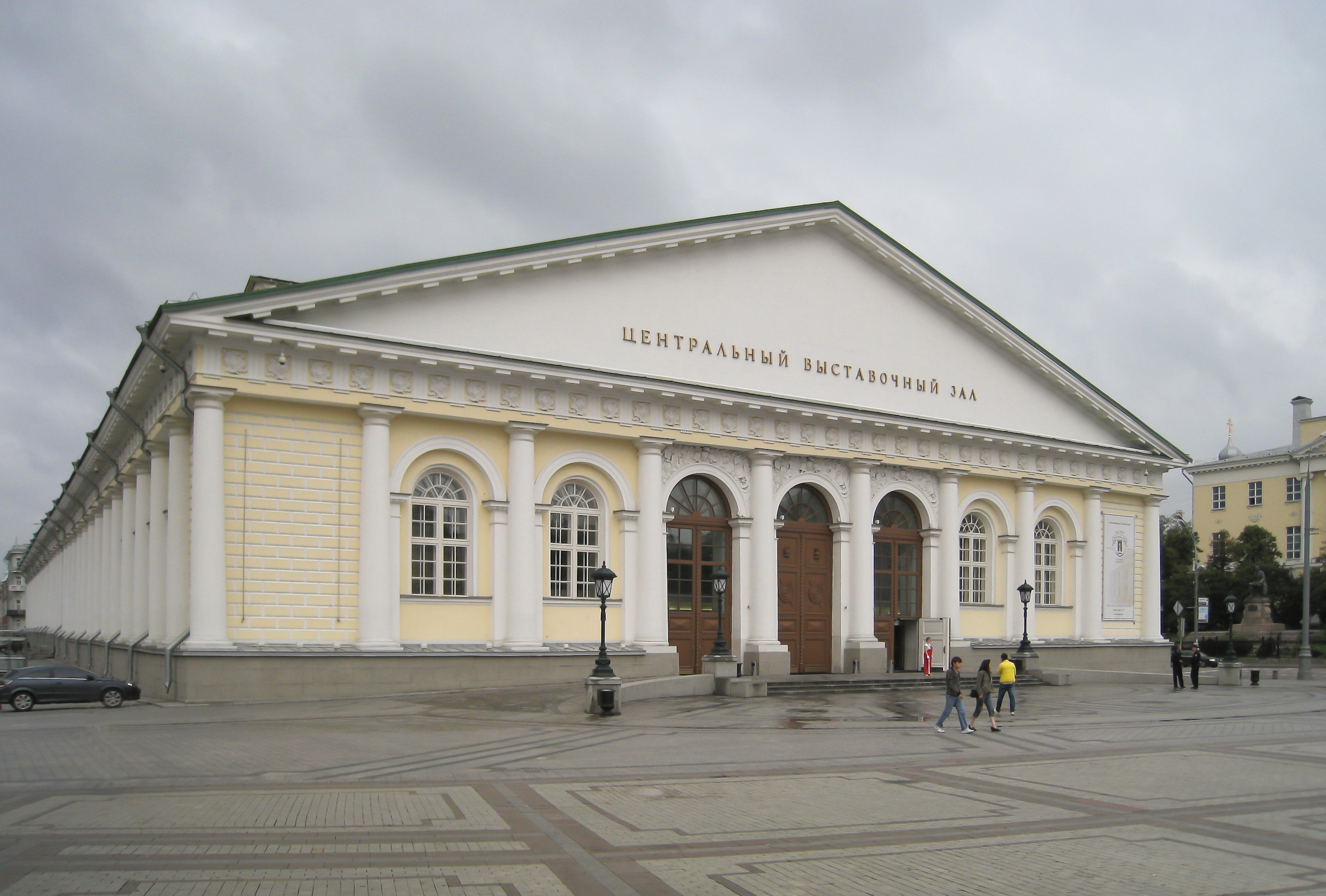
Moscow Manezh Exhibition Hall. 2008

For display at the Exhibition were selected art works created in 1957, as well as some earlier works. Many of them were previously shown at the city, regional and republic art exhibitions in 1957. Many of them were subsequently found in the collections of Soviet art museums, as well as domestic and foreign galleries and collectors. Among them there were paintings of historical genres such as Volley "Aurora" by Aleksandr Gerasimov, "First Cavalry Army" by Evsey Moiseenko, "For the Soviet Power" by Sergey Gerasimov, "Lenin proclaims Soviet power" by Boris Ioganson, "Declaration of the Soviet Power" by Alexander Samokhvalov, "Decree on Peace" and "Decree on the Land" by Vladimir Serov, "Lena. 1912" by Yuri Tulin, and others.

The theme of modernity and the modern image of the country were figuratively revealed in the works "Furnaceman" and "Blast furnace men" by Mikhail Trufanov, "Industrial Lights" by Vsevolod Bazhenov, "In the Garden" by Olga Bogaevskaya, "Blacksmiths" by Alexander Deyneka, "North pier" by Alexei Eriomin, "Grandfather and granddaughter" by Vasily Yefanov, and others.

== Acknowledgment ==
On December 7, 1957, the Exhibition was visited by the leaders of the Soviet Union Nikita Khrushchev, Yekaterina Furtseva, Leonid Brezhnev, Alexei Kosygin, Anastas Mikoyan, and Mikhail Suslov. The work and results of the All-Union Art Exhibition were widely covered in the press and literature on Soviet fine art.

== See also ==
- Soviet art
- 1957 in fine arts of the Soviet Union
- Fine Art of Leningrad
- Leningrad School of Painting
- Saint Petersburg Union of Artists
- Socialist realism

== Sources ==
- Всесоюзная художественная выставка, посвященная 40-летию Великой Октябрьской социалистической революции. Живопись. Скульптура. Графика. Работы художников театра и кино. Каталог. М., Министерство культуры СССР, 1957.
- На Всесоюзной художественной выставке // Правда, 1957, 8 декабря.
- Грабарь И. Заметки о живописи на Всесоюзной художественной выставке 1957 года. // Искусство, 1958, No.1. С.14-17.
- Недошивин Г. Окрыляющие перспективы. На Всесоюзной художественной выставке // Правда, 1957, 18 декабря.
- Полищук Э. Советская армия в произведениях художников. На Всесоюзной художественной выставке // Искусство, 1958, No.1. С.42-46.
- Никифоров Б. Черты нового в жанровой картине наших дней // Искусство, 1958, No.2. С.9-18.
- Прытков В. Новые работы советских пейзажистов // Искусство, 1958, No.2. С.19-28.
- Журнал "Искусство". 1958, No.3, С.77
- Выставки советского изобразительного искусства. Справочник. Т.5. 1954—1958 гг. М., Советский художник, 1981. С.370-379.
- Справочник членов Ленинградской организации Союза художников РСФСР. Л., Художник РСФСР, 1980.
- Художники народов СССР. Биобиблиографический словарь. Т.1-4.. М., Искусство, 1970–1995.
- Справочник членов Союза художников СССР. Том 1,2. М., Советский художник, 1979.
- Time for Change. The Art of 1960-1985 in the Soviet Union. - Saint Petersburg: State Russian Museum, 2006.
- Sergei V. Ivanov. Unknown Socialist Realism. The Leningrad School.- Saint Petersburg: NP-Print Edition, 2007. ISBN 5-901724-21-6, ISBN 978-5-901724-21-7.
- Юбилейный Справочник выпускников Санкт-Петербургского академического института живописи, скульптуры и архитектуры имени И. Е. Репина Российской Академии художеств. 1915—2005. СПб., Первоцвет, 2007.
