= Staraya Ladoga House of Creativity =

Historical arts centre in the Soviet Union

House of Creativity "Staraya Ladoga"
- Дом творчества художников «Старая Ладога»
- Founder: Vsevolod A. Bazhenov
- Location: Chernavino

The House of Creativity "Staraya Ladoga" was an all-Russian centre for artistic creativity, which existed in the Volkhovsky District of Leningrad Oblast from the mid-20th century up to the 1990s. It was located opposite the ancient village of Staraya Ladoga on the right bank of the Volkhov River.

== History ==
After the establishment of the Leningrad Union of Soviet Artists, a question about the foundation of a house for vacation and creativity was raised. For this purpose, in 1935, some accommodations were allocated in the Leningrad suburb of Gatchina. The restoration of them began in 1936, but World War II intervened in it. Gatchina was occupied for almost three years during World War II. The Gatchina Palace was destroyed, and the house for vacation and creativity, too. In February 1945, it was the second attempt at the foundation of this one. The ex-estate of Prince Nikolay Shakhovskoy in Staraya Ladoga was given up to Leningrad artists as a base zone for rest and creative work.

It was a good choice. Staraya Ladoga has always drawn the attention of Russian painters with the ancient barrows, architectural monuments, and romantic views of the Volkhov River. There were the artists Ivan Aivazovsky, Orest Kiprensky, Aleksander Orłowski, I.A. Ivanov, Alexey Venetsianov, and many others in the nineteenth century. A future member of the Imperial Academy of Arts and the Peredvizhniki group, Vassily Maximov was born and laid to rest there. He portrayed scenes from the everyday life of peasants.

Renowned artist Nicholas Roerich painted his sketches there during the summer of 1899. He named this landscape the best of the Russian landscapes. He wrote that a feeling of ancient Motherland could overfill the viewer when directing the look at Staraya Ladoga. Valentin Serov, Konstantin Korovin, and Boris Kustodiev also worked there. Alexander Samokhvalov was in Staraya Ladoga many times in 1924–26. He took part in the restoration of St. George's Church. That experience gave a great deal to this artist: it helped him to understand the effect of joining a monumental painting with the architectural forms. He painted his Staraya Ladoga (1924) and Family of Fisherman (1926, Russian Museum) there.

The restoration works continued for 15 years since 1946; meanwhile, Leningrad artists began to work in Staraya Ladoga in the 1940s. Primarily, artists stayed at the native country houses. The most popular was the house of an old woman, Tatyana Egorovna, whose portrait can be found in numerous canvases. For many years, this place was a plentiful source of inspiration for artists such as Sergei Osipov, Gleb Savinov, Nikolai Timkov, Arseny Semionov, and many others.

As an important center of the art life of Russia for 30 years, the House of Creativity "Staraya Ladoga" began to work permanently at the beginning of the 1960s after the completion of the restoration. Artists such as Evsey Moiseenko, Alexander Samokhvalov, Vecheslav Zagonek, Vladimir Ovchinnikov, Boris Ugarov, Boris Shamanov, Vsevolod Bazhenov, Piotr Buchkin, Zlata Bizova, Taisia Afonina, Marina Kozlovskaya, Dmitry Maevsky, Alexander Semionov, Arseny Semionov, Vladimir Sakson, Gleb Savinov, Elena Zhukova, Sergei Zakharov, Ivan Varichev, Veniamin Borisov, Valery Vatenin, Ivan Godlevsky, Vladimir Krantz, Lazar Yazgur, Irina Dobrekova, Pyotr Fomin, and many other Leningrad and other regions painters and graphic artists worked there.

In 1970-1980, the House of Creativity was expanding, and new buildings were built. They used it for a whole year, and dwelling there for 1–2 months was without any payment for the artists. All commitments on accommodation, meals, and journeys were made by the Art Foundation of the Russian Soviet Federative Socialist Republic.

Paintings created there or based on the studies initiated by these places reached all genres of painting, mainly landscape. Among them were: Volkhov River. Last Snow (1967) by Nikolai Timkov, Volhov. Windy Day (1964) by Leonid Whyshla, At the Volhov River (1967) by Nikolai Furmankov, St. George's Cathedral. Staraya Ladoga (1965), Spring is Coming (1972) by Vladimir Ovchinnikov, Spring on the Volkhov River (1968) by Lazar Yazgur, Memoires (1969) by Irina Dobrekova, Chernavino Village (1968), White Night over the Volkhov River (1979) by Dmitry Belyaev, Street in Staraya Ladoga (1962), Staraya Ladoga (1964), At the Volkhov River (1964) by Ivan Varichev, At the Volkhov River (1965) by Boris Ugarov, and others.

The paintings were exhibited in the largest exhibitions in the 1960s-1980s, and later in retrospective exhibitions of Soviet art. In the main museums, Russian and foreign collectors became owners of this painting. It became the base of an extensive collection of paintings, graphics, and sculptures of the museum "Staraya Ladoga".

Following the dissolution of the Soviet Union and liquidation of the Art Foundation at the beginning of the 1990s, the House of Creativity lost its financial support and was closed. Since 2003, when the 1250th anniversary of Staraya Ladoga was celebrated, public efforts to revive it have been intensified.

== See also ==
- Fine Art of Leningrad
- Leningrad School of Painting
- Academicheskaya Dacha

== Bibliography ==
- Смета административно-хозяйственных расходов и планы ЛОССХ на 1936 год // Центральный Государственный Архив литературы и искусства. СПб. Ф.78. Оп.1. Д.3, Л.2.
- Стенографический отчёт заседания Правления ЛССХ совместно с Правлением Ленизо и Художественным фондом по обсуждению плана работ на 1945 год и о подготовке к выставке 1945 года // Центральный Государственный Архив литературы и искусства. СПб. Ф.78. Оп.1. Д.49, Л.8.
- Изобразительное искусство Ленинграда. — Л: Художник РСФСР, 1976.
- А. Н. Самохвалов. Ладога, и не только Ладога // А. Н. Самохвалов. Мой творческий путь. — Л: Художник РСФСР, 1977.
- А. Н. Семёнов, С. И. Осипов, К. А. Гущин. Выставка произведений. Каталог. Авт. вступ. статьи Г. Ф. Голенький. — Л: Художник РСФСР, 1977.
- Владимир Иванович Овчинников (1911–1978). Выставка произведений. Каталог. Авт. вступ. статьи Н. В. Васильева. — Л: Художник РСФСР, 1984.
- А. Н. Самохвалов. В годы беспокойного солнца. — СПб: Всемирное слово, 1996.
- Д. В. Беляев. Низкий дом с голубыми ставнями. — СПб, Русская классика, 2002.
- Д. П. Бучкин. О доме творчества «Старая Ладога» // Д. П. Бучкин. Гравюры и рассказы. — СПб, Бибилиотека «Невского альманаха», 2004.
- С. В. Иванов. Неизвестный соцреализм. Ленинградская школа. — Санкт-Петербург: НП-Принт, 2007.
- Л. С. Конова. Санкт-Петербургский Союз художников. Краткая хроника 1932-2009 // Петербургские искусствоведческие тетради. Выпуск 16. — СПб, 2009.
- Н. В. Мурашова, Л. П. Мыслина. Дворянские усадьбы Санкт-Петербургской губернии. Южное Приладожье. Кировский и Волховский районы. — СПб, Алаборг, 2009.
- Л. С. Конова. Санкт-Петербургский Союз художников. Краткая хроника 1932-2009 // Петербургские искусствоведческие тетради. Выпуск 20. — СПб, 2012.
