= Elena Gorokhova =

Russian painter

Elena Konstantinovna Gorokhova
- Born: 19 February 1933; Leningrad, USSR
- Died: 15 January 2014 (aged 80)
- Education: Repin Institute of Arts
- Known for: Painting
- Movement: Realism, Symbolism

Elena Konstantinovna Gorokhova (Russian: Еле́на Константи́новна Горо́хова; 19 February 1933 – 15 January 2014) was a Russian painter, living and working in Saint Petersburg, regarded as one of representatives of the Leningrad School of Painting.

== Biography ==
Elena Gorokhova was born 19 February 1933 in Leningrad. In 1951 she graduated from Secondary Art School under the Academy of Arts and joined the painting department of the Leningrad Institute of Painting, Sculpture and Architecture named after Ilya Repin. She studied with Vladimir Gorb and Semion Abugov.

In 1957 Gorokhova graduated from the Leningrad Institute in Joseph Serebriany's personal art studio. Her graduation work was a painting named An Alarm Bell.

Elena Gorokhova has participated in art exhibitions since 1958. She paints genre and decorative compositions, landscapes, and still lifes. She works in the technique of oil painting, tempera painting, and watercolors. She has been a member of Saint Petersburg Union of Artists since 1960 (before 1992 it was the Leningrad branch of Union of Artists of Russian Federation) .

Themes and characters of Gorokhova's works often inspired motifs of folklore scenes of Russian folk tales and legends. Her images are filled with allegory and symbolism. She prefers decorative painting with a clear silhouette, local color, symbolic composition, while maintaining constructive role of drawing. The color is decorative and "flat", often with a predominance of cool green and blue tones that permeate and unite scenic fabric and amplifying fantastic, sometimes mystical sound of painting.

Among Elena Gorokhova's major art works are the following paintings: "Girlfriends" (1958), "Hoarfrost" and "Farewell" (both 1960), "Bread store's woman seller" (1961), "Winter in Pereslavl-Zalessky" (1961), "Still life" (1965), "Linda" (1973), "For the water" (1975), "The morning after a Snowfall", "Ballerina", "Fox" (all 1975), "White Horse" and "Fire-bird's feather" (both 1979), "Debut" (1980), "Oven" (1988), and others.

Paintings by Elena Gorokhova reside in art museums and private collections in Russia, France, Germany, USA, England and other countries.

== Sources ==
- All-Union Art Exhibition of 1957 dedicated to the 40th Anniversary of October Revolution. Catalogue. – Moscow: Soviet artist, 1957. P.22.
- Осенняя выставка произведений ленинградских художников 1958 года. Каталог. Л., Художник РСФСР, 1959. C.10.
- Всесоюзная художественная выставка «40 лет ВЛКСМ». Каталог. М., Министерство культуры СССР, 1958.
- Выставка произведений ленинградских художников 1960 года. Каталог. Л., Художник РСФСР, 1961. C.14.
- Выставка произведений ленинградских художников 1961 года. Каталог. Л., Художник РСФСР, 1964. C.14.
- Натюрморт. Выставка произведений ленинградских художников 1973 года. Л., Художник РСФСР, 1973. C.8.
- Наш современник. Третья выставка произведений ленинградских художников 1973 года. Каталог. Л., Художник РСФСР, 1974. C.8.
- "Our Contemporary" regional exhibition of Leningrad artists of 1975. Catalogue. Leningrad, Khudozhnik RSFSR, 1980. P.14.
- Справочник членов Союза художников СССР. Т.1. М., Советский художник, 1979. C.272.
- Regional Exhibition of works by Leningrad artists of 1980. Exhibition catalogue. Leningrad, Khudozhnik RSFSR, 1983. P.12.
- Выставки советского изобразительного искусства. Справочник. Т.5. 1954—1958 годы. М., Советский художник, 1981. C.361, 373, 528, 532, 548, 587.
- Справочник членов Ленинградской организации Союза художников РСФСР. Л., Художник РСФСР, 1987. C.32.
- Выставка произведений ленинградских художников. Живопись. Каталог. Л., Художник РСФСР, 1980. C.8–13.
- Интерьер и натюрморт. Выставка произведений живописи художников Российской Федерации. Каталог. Л., Художник РСФСР, 1991. C.49.
- Петербургские музы. Выставка. Живопись, графика, декоративно-прикладное искусство. СПб., Мемориальный музей Н. А. Некрасова, 1995.
- Связь времён. 1932—1997. Художники – члены Санкт – Петербургского Союза художников России. Каталог выставки. СПб., ЦВЗ "Манеж", 1997. С.286.
- Русская деревня. Выставка произведений петербургских художников. Живопись. Графика. СПб., Мемориальный музей Н. А. Некрасова, 1998.
- Matthew C. Bown. Dictionary of 20th Century Russian and Soviet Painters 1900-1980s. – London: Izomar 1998. ISBN 0-9532061-0-6, ISBN 978-0-9532061-0-0.
- Sergei V. Ivanov. Unknown Socialist Realism. The Leningrad School. – Saint Petersburg: NP-Print Edition, 2007. PP.360, 391–393, 396–398, 400, 401, 405, 443. ISBN 5-901724-21-6, ISBN 978-5-901724-21-7.
- Юбилейный Справочник выпускников Санкт-Петербургского академического института живописи, скульптуры и архитектуры имени И. Е. Репина Российской Академии художеств. 1915—2005. СПб., "Первоцвет", 2007. С.78. ISBN 978-5-903677-01-6.
