= Spring Day (Pozdneev) =

1959 painting by Nikolai Pozdneev

- Artist: Nikolai M. Pozdneev
- Year: 1959
- Type: Oil on board
- Dimensions: 130 cm × 94 cm (52 in × 37 in)
- Location: Private collection; Saint Petersburg

Spring Day (Russian: Весенний день (картина Н. Позднеева) is a painting by Russian artist Nikolai Matveevich Pozdneev (1930–1978). It was painted in 1959.

== History ==
Spring Day was one of the first original genre compositions by Pozdneev. He developed the theme for the first time raised three years earlier in his graduate painting From the School (1956, now in the Pskov Painting Gallery). The first version of the painting was shown in 1960 in the principal Art Show in Leningrad and in Moscow. The artist was not fully satisfied and repainted the picture, making it a more extended vertically. A group of children was shifted from the center to the upper left corner. The bold decision proved justified: composition of the painting acquired aspiration, which is consistent with the general concept of the work. The palette of the picture became lighter. As a result, in the work began to fully feel the air of spring and hope, in tune with the mood of the era turn of the decades.

From 1960 to 1980, Spring Day was kept in the artist's family. In 1994, after a long pause, it was featured at the Painting of 1940-1990s. The Leningrad School Art Show in the Exhibition Halls of the Saint Petersburg Union of Artists.

In 1995–1996, Spring Day was exhibited in Saint Petersburg in the Nekrasov Memorial Museum at the exhibitions The Lyrical motive in painting of artists of the WWII generation, and Painting of 1940-1990s. The Leningrad School.

The painting was reproduced on the official poster and cover of the exhibition catalog.

In 2007, Spring Day was reproduced and described among 350 art works by Leningrad artists in the book Unknown Socialist Realism. The Leningrad School, published in Russian and English.

In 2019 the painting was reproduced in the book The Leningrad School of Painting. Essays on the History, published in Russian and English.

== See also ==
- Artist Nikolai Pozdneev (1930—1978)
- Leningrad School of Painting

== Bibliography ==
- Exhibition of works by Leningrad artists of 1960. Exhibition catalogue. - Leningrad: Khudozhnik RSFSR, 1961. P. 33.
- The Soviet Russia. The Republic Exhibition of 1960. Exhibition catalogue. - Moscow: Soviet Artist, 1960. P. 65.
- Directory of Members of the Union of Artists of USSR. Volume 2.- Moscow: Soviet artist, 1979. P. 216.
- Paintings of 1950-1980s by the Leningrad School's artists. Exhibition catalogue. - Saint Petersburg, Saint Petersburg Union of Artists, 1994. P. 4.
- Lyrical motives in the works of artists of the WWII generation. Painting, drawings. Exhibition catalogue. - Saint Petersburg, Nikolai Nekrasov Memorial museum, 1995. P. 6.
- Painting of 1940-1990s. The Leningrad School. Exhibition catalogue. - Saint Petersburg, Nikolai Nekrasov Memorial museum, 1996. P. 6.
- Matthew C. Bown. Dictionary of 20th Century Russian and Soviet Painters 1900-1980s. - London: Izomar, 1998. ISBN 0-9532061-0-6, ISBN 978-0-9532061-0-0.
- Sergei V. Ivanov. Unknown Socialist Realism. The Leningrad School. Saint Petersburg, NP-Print Edition, 2007. P.201. ISBN 5-901724-21-6, ISBN 978-5-901724-21-7.
