= 1954 in fine arts of the Soviet Union =

The year 1954 was marked by many events that left an imprint on the history of Soviet and Russian Fine Arts.

== Events ==
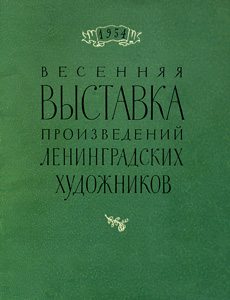
Exhibition catalogue

- February 12 — Regional State picture gallery opened in city of Vologda. Works of prominent Russian and foreign artists are presented in collection of gallery. Among them George Dawe, Viktor Vasnetsov, Mikhail Nesterov, Mikhail Vrubel, Alexandre Benois, Aleksandr Borisov, Arkhip Kuindzhi, Ivan Aivazovsky, Isaac Levitan, Vasily Vereshchagin, Ilya Repin, Vasily Polenov, and others. In collection are presented also paintings of the Vologda artists. The unique art gallery is in an area.
- The Spring exhibition of works by leningrad artists opened in the Leningrad Union of Artists. The participants were Evgenia Antipova, Nikolai Baskakov, Sergei Frolov, Nikolai Galakhov, Vladimir Gorb, Maya Kopitseva, Boris Korneev, Elena Kostenko, Anna Kostrova, Gevork Kotiantz, Valeria Larina, Boris Lavrenko, Ivan Lavsky, Gavriil Malish, Alexei Mozhaev, Nikolai Mukho, Samuil Nevelshtein, Yuri Neprintsev, Sergei Osipov, Lev Russov, Ivan Savenko, Vladimir Seleznev, Arseny Semionov, Alexander Shmidt, Elena Skuin, Victor Teterin, Nikolai Timkov, Mikhail Tkachev, Leonid Tkachenko, Vecheslav Zagonek, and other important Leningrad artists.
- June 6 — In Moscow on Tverskaya Square in front of Moscow City Hall was opened sculptural monument to the Moscow founder of Prince Yuri Dolgoruky. The monument sculptors S. Orlov, A. Antropov, N. Shtamm, architectural design V. Andreev.
- Chairman of the Leningrad Union of Soviet Artists was elected painter Joseph Serebriany, who held the position until 1957.
- The exhibition of Soviet art shows in the Chinese cities of Beijing, Shanghai, Guangzhou, Hangzhou. The participants were Yuri Neprintsev, Vecheslav Zagonek, Vladimir Serov, Boris Korneev, Alexander Laktionov, Ivan Savenko, Yuri Tulin, and other artists.

== Deaths ==
- April 14 — Mikhail Avilov (Russian: Авилов Михаил Иванович), Russian soviet painter, Honored art worker of Russian Federation, professor of Repin Institute of Arts (born 1882).
- June 28 — Veniamin Bogolubov (Russian: Боголюбов Вениамин Яковлевич), Russian soviet sculptor, Stalin Prize winner (born 1895).
- August 28 — Leonid Sherwood or Shervud (Russian: Леонид Владимирович Шервуд, Russian sculptor and architect (born 1871).
- December 5 — Solomon Yudovin (Russian: Юдовин Соломон Борисович), Russian soviet graphic artists (born 1892).
- December 29 — Ivan Gorushkin-Sorokopudov (Russian: Горюшкин-Сорокопудов Иван Силыч), Russian soviet painter and graphic artists, Honored art worker of Russian Federation (born 1873).
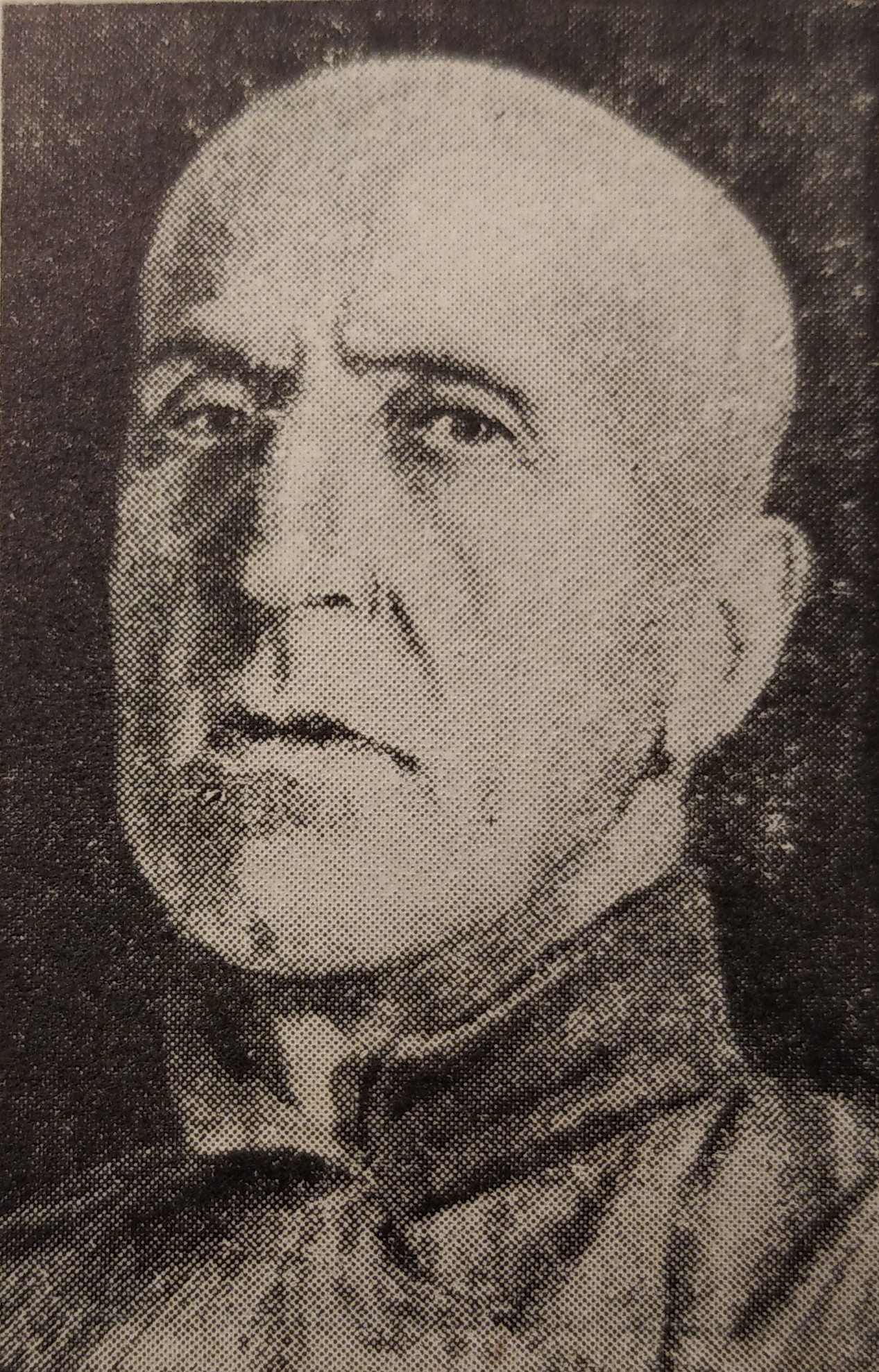
Leonid Sherwood

== See also ==
- List of Russian artists
- List of painters of Leningrad Union of Artists
- Saint Petersburg Union of Artists
- Russian culture
- 1954 in the Soviet Union

== Sources ==
- Весенняя выставка произведений ленинградских художников 1954 года. Каталог. — Л: ЛОСХ, 1956.
- Коровкевич C. Ярче и глубже показывать новое, передовое. Заметки о весенней выставке работ ленинградских художников // Вечерний Ленинград, 1954, 12 июня.
- Земская М. За правду жизни и большую мысль. К итогам осенней выставки ленинградских художников // Смена, 1954, 18 декабря.
- Выставка произведений ленинградских художников. Живопись, скульптура, графика. Каталог. Л., ГРМ, 1954.
- Третья Всесоюзная выставка дипломных работ студентов художественных вузов СССР выпуска 1954 года. Каталог. — М: Министерство Культуры СССР, 1954.
- Artists of Peoples of the USSR. Biography Dictionary. Vol. 1. Moscow, Iskusstvo, 1970.
- Artists of Peoples of the USSR. Biography Dictionary. Vol. 2. Moscow, Iskusstvo, 1972.
- Directory of Members of Union of Artists of USSR. Volume 1,2. Moscow, Soviet Artist Edition, 1979.
- Выставки советского изобразительного искусства. Справочник. Т.5. 1954–1958 годы. М., Советский художник, 1981.
- Artists of Peoples of the USSR. Biography Dictionary. Vol. 4 Book 1. Moscow, Iskusstvo, 1983.
- Directory of Members of the Leningrad branch of the Union of Artists of Russian Federation. – Leningrad: Khudozhnik RSFSR, 1987.
- Artists of peoples of the USSR. Biography Dictionary. Vol. 4 Book 2. – Saint Petersburg: Academic project humanitarian agency, 1995.
- Matthew C. Bown. Dictionary of 20th Century Russian and Soviet Painters 1900-1980s. London, Izomar, 1998.
- Vern G. Swanson. Soviet Impressionism. Woodbridge, England, Antique Collectors' Club, 2001.
- Sergei V. Ivanov. Unknown Socialist Realism. The Leningrad School. Saint-Petersburg, NP-Print Edition, 2007. ISBN 5-901724-21-6, ISBN 978-5-901724-21-7.
- Юбилейный Справочник выпускников Санкт-Петербургского академического института живописи, скульптуры и архитектуры имени И. Е. Репина Российской Академии художеств. 1915–2005. — Санкт Петербург: «Первоцвет», 2007.
- Anniversary Directory graduates of Saint Petersburg State Academic Institute of Painting, Sculpture, and Architecture named after Ilya Repin, Russian Academy of Arts. 1915–2005. Saint Petersburg: Pervotsvet Publishing House, 2007. ISBN 1-85149-549-5, ISBN 978-1-85149-549-8.
- Конова Л. Санкт—Петербургский Союз художников. Краткая хроника 1932–2009. 2-я часть. 1946–1958 // Петербургские искусствоведческие тетради. Вып. 20. СПб, 2011. С.175—198.
