= 1969 in fine arts of the Soviet Union =

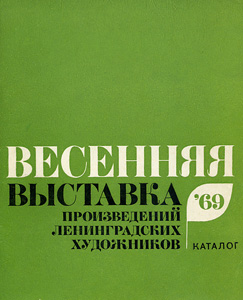
Exhibition Catalog

The year 1969 was marked by many events that left an imprint on the history of Soviet and Russian Fine Arts.

== Events ==
- The Spring Exhibition of work by Leningrad artists of 1969 was opened in the Leningrad Union of Artists. The participants were Vladimir Andreev, Evgenia Antipova, Vsevolod Bazhenov, Veniamin Borisov, Nikolai Galakhov, Irina Dobrekova, Vecheslav Zagonek, Victor Korovin, Boris Kotik, Mikhail Kozell, Sergei Lastochkin, Dmitry Maevsky, Boris Maluev, Alexander Naumov, Yaroskav Nikolaev, Victor Otiev, Lev Ovchinnikov, Yuri Pavlov, Ivan Savenko, Vladimir Sakson, Alexander Semionov, Yuri Shablikin, Boris Shamanov, Alexander Shmidt, Elena Skuin, German Tatarinov, Ivan Varichev, Valery Vatenin, Lazar Yazgur, and other important Leningrad artists.
- Exhibition of works by Mikhail Platunov was opened in the Leningrad Union of Artists.
- Exhibition «Ilya Repin and his pupils» was opened in the Museum of the Academy of Arts in Leningrad.

== Deaths ==
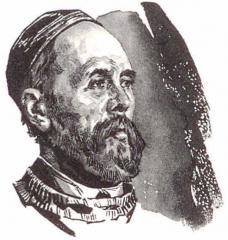
Vasily Vatagin by Peter Bendel

- March 1 — Mikhail Kurilko (Russian: Курилко Михаил Иванович), Russian soviet theatre artist (born 1880).
- March 6 — Nadya Rusheva (Russian: Надежда Николаевна Рушева), Russian soviet graphic artist (born 1952).
- May 18 — Yacob Romas (Russian: Ромас Яков Дорофеевич), Russian soviet painter, People's Artist of the USSR (born 1902).
- May 31 — Vasily Vatagin (Russian: Ватагин Василий Алексеевич), Russian soviet sculptor, People's Artist of the Russian Federation, Stalin Prize winner (born 1883).
- June 12 — Aleksandr Deyneka (Russian: Александр Александрович Дейнека), Russian soviet painter, People's Artist of the USSR, Stalin Prize winner (born 1899).
- August 30 — Vladislav Anisovich (Russian: Анисович Владислав Леопольдович), Russian soviet painter and art educator (born 1908)

== See also ==
- List of Russian artists
- List of painters of Leningrad Union of Artists
- Saint Petersburg Union of Artists
- Russian culture

== Sources ==
- Весенняя выставка произведений ленинградских художников 1969 года. Каталог. Л., Художник РСФСР, 1970.
- Artists of Peoples of the USSR. Biography Dictionary. Vol. 1. Moscow, Iskusstvo, 1970.
- Artists of Peoples of the USSR. Biography Dictionary. Vol. 2. Moscow, Iskusstvo, 1972.
- Directory of Members of Union of Artists of USSR. Volume 1,2. Moscow, Soviet Artist Edition, 1979.
- Directory of Members of the Leningrad branch of the Union of Artists of Russian Federation. Leningrad, Khudozhnik RSFSR, 1980.
- Artists of Peoples of the USSR. Biography Dictionary. Vol. 4 Book 1. Moscow, Iskusstvo, 1983.
- Directory of Members of the Leningrad branch of the Union of Artists of Russian Federation. - Leningrad: Khudozhnik RSFSR, 1987.
- Artists of peoples of the USSR. Biography Dictionary. Vol. 4 Book 2. - Saint Petersburg: Academic project humanitarian agency, 1995.
- Link of Times: 1932 - 1997. Artists - Members of Saint Petersburg Union of Artists of Russia. Exhibition catalogue. - Saint Petersburg: Manezh Central Exhibition Hall, 1997.
- Matthew C. Bown. Dictionary of 20th Century Russian and Soviet Painters 1900-1980s. - London: Izomar, 1998.
- Vern G. Swanson. Soviet Impressionism. - Woodbridge, England: Antique Collectors' Club, 2001.
- Время перемен. Искусство 1960—1985 в Советском Союзе. СПб., Государственный Русский музей, 2006.
- Sergei V. Ivanov. Unknown Socialist Realism. The Leningrad School. - Saint-Petersburg: NP-Print Edition, 2007. - ISBN 5-901724-21-6, ISBN 978-5-901724-21-7.
- Anniversary Directory graduates of Saint Petersburg State Academic Institute of Painting, Sculpture, and Architecture named after Ilya Repin, Russian Academy of Arts. 1915 - 2005. - Saint Petersburg: Pervotsvet Publishing House, 2007.
