= Still Life with Pussy-Willows =

1964 painting by Taisia Afonina

- Artist: Taisia Afonina
- Year: 1964
- Medium: Oil on canvas
- Dimensions: 80 cm × 60 cm (32 in × 24 in)
- Location: private collection

Still Life with Pussy-Willows is a painting by Taisia Afonina (Russian: Таисия Кирилловна Афонина), a Russian artist who lived and worked in Leningrad. She was a member of the Leningrad branch of Union of Artists of Russian Federation and representative of the Leningrad School of Painting. The painting shows a typical table laid for tea drinking on a spring day in a Leningrad apartment in the mid-1960s.

== History ==
The canvas was painted in April 1964 in Leningrad on Zverinskaya Street, 2/5, in the apartment 21, where Afonina lived from 1952 to 1994. It depicts the daily life of a bygone era. Composition of the painting is devoid of stage effects, and the arrangement of objects is organic and natural. Almost nothing is unnatural in artist's composition, so this gives the created image special force of impact on the viewer.

Still Life with Pussy-Willows was first exhibited in 1965 at the Spring Exhibition of Leningrad artists in the Leningrad Union of Artists. In 1994, the painting was displayed in Saint Petersburg at the exhibition The Paintings of 1950-1980s by Artists of the Leningrad School. It was shown in the Saint Petersburg Nikolai Nekrasov Memorial Museum in the exhibitions Lyrical motives in the works of artists of the war generation (1995), Painting of 1940-1990s: The Leningrad School (1996), and Still life in painting of 1950-1990s: The Leningrad School (1997).

In 2007 the painting was reproduced and described among 350 art works by Leningrad artists in the book Unknown Socialist Realism: The Leningrad School, published in Russian and English. In 2011 the painting was described in an article by Sergei Ivanov, "Still life at the Leningrad Table", published in St. Petersburg Art History Notebooks. In 2012 it was exhibited at the Art Show devoted to the 80th Anniversary of the Saint Petersburg Union of Artists.

== See also ==
- List of Russian artists
- List of 20th-century Russian painters
- List of painters of Saint Petersburg Union of Artists
- List of the Russian Landscape painters
- 1964 in art

== Sources ==
- Каталог весенней выставки произведений ленинградских художников 1965 года. Л., 1970. С.7.
- Художники народов СССР. Биобиблиографический словарь. Т.1. М., 1970. С.236.
- Александр Иванович Савинов. Письма. Документы. Воспоминания. Л., 1983.
- Ленинградские художники. Живопись 1950—1980 годов. Каталог. СПб., 1994. С.3.
- Живопись 1940—1990 годов. Ленинградская школа. Выставка произведений. СПб., 1996. С.3.
- Федоров С. Весна в городе и натюрморт с вербами // Смена. 1996, 6 марта.
- Визирякина Т. Эпоха. Время. Художник // Невское зеркало. 1996, No. 7.
- Арсеньева З. Ленинградская школа складывалась во времена «ленинградского дела» // «Пятница». Еженедельное приложение к газете «Час Пик». 1996, 8 марта.
- Натюрморт в живописи 1950—1990 годов. Ленинградская школа. СПб., 1997. С.3.
- Серегин С. О сущности стола // Вечерний Петербург. 1997, 21 мая.
- Иванов С. Тихая жизнь за ленинградским столом // Петербургские искусствоведческие тетради. Выпуск 23. СПб., 2012. С.90-97.
