= Vladimir Malevsky =

Russian painter (1925-1981)

Vladimir Evgenievich Malevsky
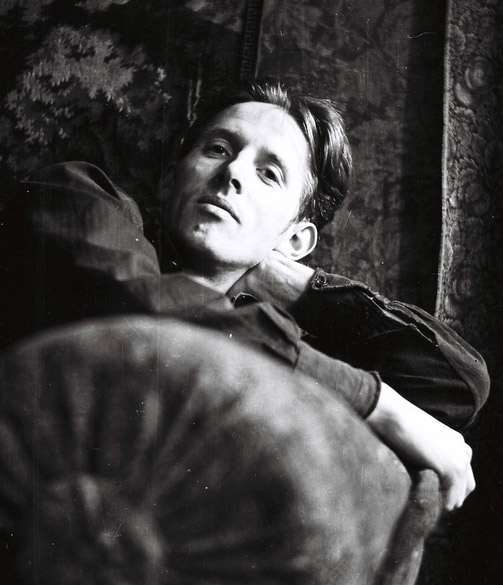
- Born: 1 November 1925; Leningrad, USSR
- Died: 17 October 1981 (aged 55); Leningrad, Russian Federation
- Education: Repin Institute of Arts
- Known for: Painting
- Movement: Realism
- Awards: Medal "For the Victory Over Germany"

Vladimir Evgenievich Malevsky (Russian: Владимир Евгеньевич Малевский; 1 November 1925, Leningrad, USSR - 17 October 1981, Leningrad, USSR) was a Soviet Russian painter and graphic artist, a member of the Leningrad Union of Soviet Artists, who lived and worked in Leningrad. Vladimir Malevsky regard as one of representatives of the Leningrad school of painting.

== Biography ==
Vladimir Malevsky was born on 1 November 1925 in Leningrad. He suffered in the Blokade winter of 1941 in Leningrad. In Murch of 1942 he was evacuated to Arkhangelsk and in 1943 he was draft to the Red Army. In February 1944 Vladimir Malevsky was hardly wounded and later he gave an early discharge from military service on medical grounds. Returning to Arkhangelsk, he became a student of an artist in the cinema "Edisson". In 1946 Vladimir Malevsky returned to Leningrad with his mother Elisaveta Fedorovna Zinovjeva (1894-1958) and younger sister. His father Evgeny Vladimyrovich Malevsky dead in 1942.

In Leningrad in 1951 Malevsky graduated Tavricheskaya Art School and was accepted to Institute of Painting, Sculpture and Architecture where he studied of Alexander Zaytsev, Vasily Sokolov, Leonid Khudiakov. In 1957 he graduated it in the Boris Ioganson workshop with the rank of artist of painting. His degree work was a painting titled "At the construction site".

After finishing his study Vladimir Malevsky continued the employment in the Boris Ioganson workshop from 1958 till 1960. In 1957 Vladimir Malevsky was adopted in the Leningrad Union of Soviet Artists. Since 1957 Malevsky had participated in Art Exhibitions. He painted genre and historical painting, landscapes, cityscapes, still lifes. Among his works were "Peonies" (1958), "Summer Day" (1961), "The Year of 1905" (1967), «Lilac» (1972), «Bicyclists», «Regatta» (both 1980), and others.

Vladimir Evgenievich Malevsky died in Leningrad on 17 October 1981. His paintings reside in art museums and private collections in the Russia, France, in the U.S., Ukraine, Germany, England, and other countries.

== See also ==
- Fine Art of Leningrad
- Leningrad School of Painting
- List of 20th-century Russian painters
- List of painters of Saint Petersburg Union of Artists
- Saint Petersburg Union of Artists

== Sources ==
- Центральный Государственный Архив литературы и искусства. СПб. Ф.78. Оп.5. Д.124.
- Всесоюзная художественная выставка, посвящённая 40-летию Великой Октябрьской социалистической революции. Каталог. М., Советский художник, 1957. С.46.
- Выставка произведений ленинградских художников 1961 года. Каталог. Л., Художник РСФСР, 1964. С.26.
- Натюрморт. Выставка произведений ленинградских художников 1973 года. Л., Художник РСФСР, 1973. С.10.
- Изобразительное искусство Ленинграда. Каталог выставки. Л., Художник РСФСР, 1976. C.23.
- Справочник членов Ленинградской организации Союза художников РСФСР. Л., Художник РСФСР, 1980. С.73.
- Зональная выставка произведений ленинградских художников 1980 года. Каталог. Л., Художник РСФСР, 1983. C.16-17.
- Ленинградские художники. Живопись 1950—1980 годов. Каталог. СПб., 1994. С.3.
- Натюрморт в живописи 1940—1990 годов. Ленинградская школа. Каталог выставки. СПб., 1997. С.3.
- Связь времен. 1932—1997. Художники — члены Санкт — Петербургского Союза художников России. Каталог выставки. СПб., 1997. С.292.
- Matthew Cullerne Bown. A Dictionary of Twentieth Century Russian And Soviet Painters. 1900 — 1980s. London, Izomar Limited, 1998.
- Юбилейный Справочник выпускников Санкт-Петербургского академического института живописи, скульптуры и архитектуры имени И. Е. Репина Российской Академии художеств. 1915—2005. СПб., Первоцвет, 2007. С.79.
