= Nikolai Timkov =

Russian artist (1912–1993)

- Николай Тимков
- Born: 12 August 1912; Rostov-on-Don, Don Host Oblast, Russian Empire
- Died: 25 December 1993 (aged 81); Saint Petersburg, Russia
- Education: Repin Institute of Arts
- Known for: Painting
- Movement: Realism
- Awards: Medal "For the Defence of Leningrad"; Medal "For the Victory Over Germany"

Nikolai Efimovich Timkov (Russian: Николай Ефимович Тимков; 12 August 1912 – 25 December 1993) was a Soviet Russian painter, Honored Artist of Russian Federation, and a member of the Saint Petersburg Union of Artists (before 1992 the Leningrad branch of Union of Artists of Russian Federation). He lived and worked in Leningrad and is regarded as one of the leading representatives of the Leningrad School of Painting, worldwide known for his landscape paintings.

== Biography ==
Nikolai Efimovich Timkov was born on 12 August 1912 at a settlement of Nakhichevanskaya Dacha close to Rostov-on-Don, Russian Empire. His parents, Efim Yegorovich Timkov and Vasilisa Timofeevna Ablyazova, were peasants from the Saratov province. In 1892, they moved to Rostov-on-Don. His father worked as a general worker. The family had four older children. Parents died in 1924, when Nikolai was twelve years old. Care of him took the older sisters.

In 1927, Nikolai Timkov finished 8 grades of secondary school and enrolled in the Rostov Art College, which was headed by A. Chinenov, who was landscape painter, a pupil of Vasily Polenov and a big fan of Isaac Levitan.

In 1930, Timkov graduated from Art College. In 1931, he went to Moscow, where he met Pavel Radimov and other Moscow artists of AKhR Association (Association of Artists of the Revolution).

Timkov worked in "Izogiz" edition as a general worker, then enrolled at the Association "Vsekohudozhnik" as an artist-designer. At the same time he taught himself at the Tretyakov Gallery and did much plein air painting, occasionally heeding the benevolent advice of Mikhail Nesterov and Sergey Malyutin. At Radimov's apartment he met Isaak Brodsky, who played a big role in the fate of the artist. After seeing his work, Brodsky advised Nikolai Timkov to go to Leningrad to continue his art education.

In 1933 Nikolai Timkov together with Alexander Laktionov arrived in Leningrad and entered the painting department of the Leningrad Institute of Painting, Sculpture and Architecture of the All-Russian Academy of Arts. He studied with Mikhail Bernshtein, Arcady Rylov, Alexander Lubimov, and Vladimir Serov. In 1939 Nikolai Timkov graduated from the Institute of Painting, Sculpture and Architecture in Isaak Brodsky workshop with the rank of artist of painting. His degree work was a painting titled The Day off in suburb. In one year with Timkov Institute graduates Piotr Belousov, Mikhail Kozell, Lev Orekhov, Aleksei Gritsai, Elena Skuin, Gleb Verner, Lia Ostrova, Boris Sherbakov, and other young artists who later became famous Soviet painters and art educators.

After graduation, Nikolai Timkov was called up for military service in the Baltic Fleet, where he served until 1946. During the Great Patriotic War and Blockade of Leningrad Timkov was among defenders of Leningrad. During brief visits to the city, he created a series of graphic works (gouache, watercolor), depicting the Siege of Leningrad (now in the collection of the State Russian Museum and the Museum of the History of Saint Petersburg). Timkov participated in the Exhibition of the defenders of Leningrad, also in the Exhibition titled "The Heroics of Soviet Front and Rear" in Moscow at the Tretyakov Gallery in 1943, as well as creating the greatest during the war years Exhibition "The Heroic defense of Leningrad", opened in 1944 and marked the beginning of the Museum of Defense of Leningrad. Timkov was awarded the medals "For Defense of Leningrad", and "For Victory over Germany". In 1943, Nikolai Timkov has been accepted in members of the Leningrad Union of Soviet Artists.

His first part in Art exhibition refers to 1929 (Rostov on Don). In 1947, in the halls of the Leningrad Union of Soviet Artists has been opened the first solo exhibition of his works, as shown later in Leningrad at the Cinema House and the House of Arts. He painted landscapes, genre paintings, worked in watercolors and oil painting. Most famous as master of lyrical landscapes. Since the late 1940s, Nikolai Timkov become the constant participant of Leningrad, Republican, and All-Union Art Exhibitions, including All-Union Art Exhibition of 1957 in Moscow, devoted to the 40th Anniversary of the October Revolution. Formation of his individual creative style proceeded gradually, as experience and lessons learned in the process of communicating with your colleagues and numerous creative travel to the Volga River and Don River, in Staraya Ladoga, the Urals, the work in Wira and Christmas village near Leningrad, on the Academicheskaya Dacha. Already as a mature master he visits Italy (1969), England (1974), France (1977), Yugoslavia (1981).

== Creativity ==
Nikolai Timkov Russian Winter. Hoarfrost. 1969.

In the first post World War II decade, Timkov style developed and improved in areas identified during the years of study. He was entirely under the influence of the 19th-century Russian landscape painters. Real space in his works passed almost illusory precision, the colors muted. In landscapes of Don and Volga he tends to cover a larger space with the image of the set clearly legible plans that is in line with general trends in the genre of these years. Among the famous works of this period were painting Harvest (1950), Lights of Hydro Power Station, Soon Harvest (both 1951), Winter Landscape (1952), Don River Distance (1953), Evening on the Don River, At the Don River (both 1954), Silent Fall. On the Don, The Last Snow, Towards Spring (all 1955), Windy Day, Evening (both 1956), Ice moved, Evening on the Volga River (both 1957), and others.

Etudes he painted from life include: Landscape (1954), Spring Landscape (1955), Wira village, Winter (both 1956), White Night (1957), Last Ray, Towards spring, Young Aspen trees (all 1958), and others. In them Timkov often can be preserved impressions of the direct perception of nature. But the sketch in those years was considered only as auxiliary material for landscape painting, with its large size, an essential genre-narrative beginning with the careful selection and meticulous attention to detail and alignment of the composition. Not surprisingly, therefore, that at the solo exhibition of 1957 in the Leningrad Union of Artists, as later in Rostov on Don, Timkov's work remained within the tenets and practices of Soviet landscape painting of the 1940s–1950s.

However, in his work a specific use of color and a recurring selection of themes occurred. His painting becomes decorative, pattern and shapes becomes more generalized. The artist often resorted to building tracks around the large volumes and planes.

Timkov did not stop the quest for his identity until the last years of his life and yet his style of art lives on to the mid-1960s. This assures attentive acquaintance with the works of this period, shown in solo exhibitions of 1964 in Leningrad, Moscow, Yaroslavl, Krasnodar, Stavropol, Kislovodsk, Rostov-on-Don, Ordzhonikidze, Nalchik, and in 1975 in Leningrad. They traced the development of the artist's manner from traditional plein air painting aside impressionistic enrichment and refinement of color, enhanced decoration, styling and some conventions of the drawing.

In 1960, the talent of Nikolai Timkov was fully disclosed in all kinds of creativity – from large landscape painting to nature studies of small forms. Among them paintings A First Snow (1961), On the Tesa River, Street in Kholuy, Autumn Cherry trees (all 1962), February azure (1963 ), In the March (1965), A Spring, Autumn Gold, Volkhov River. A Last Snow (all 1967), Sunny Day, Winter has come, ″Torzhok″ (all 1968), "Russian Winter. A Hoarfrost." (1969), April, Mstino Lake (1971), June Blue, A May. Bird cherry blossoms (both 1972), In the Snow (1973), Danilov Monastery in the Pereslavl-Zaleski ancient town (1974), A Field under snow, A February (both 1975), and others.

After a successful exhibition of 1975, Timkov continues to work actively in Valentinovka village located near Academicheskaya Dacha, as well as his Leningrad studio in a house on the Pesochnaya Embankment 16. He travels to the Crimea, the Black Sea coast of Caucasus, visited France and Yugoslavia. From now until the end of life the majority of his works will be created in the village of Valentinovka] and its surroundings near the Vyshny Volochyok town in Tver Oblast. Timkov worked here every year from April–May to November, sometimes in winter. He painted banks of Msta River and Mstino Lake, and nearby villages Kotchische, Bolshoy Gorodok, Maliy Gorodok, Podol, Kisharino, Terpigorevo. Among Timkov's works of this period were First Snow, An Autumn (both 1977), Torzhok, Rainy (both 1978), Winter in Torzhok town, Winter Morning, Summer Evening, ″A Garden″, A First Snow (all 1980), A Spring (1982), Twilight (1983), Crimea (1988), Pereslavl-Zalesky town (1992), and a lot others.

In 1982 in Moscow in the halls of the Moscow House of Artists at the street of Kuznetsky Bridge successfully hosted an exhibition of works by Nikolai Timkov shown later both in the Gagarin Air Force Academy and in Stars City. In 1987 Nikolai Timkov was awarded an honorable title of Honored Artist of Russian Federation. His last lifetime exhibition has been shown in 1993 in the halls of Saint Petersburg Union of Artists.

Nikolai Efimovich Timkov died on 25 December 1993 in Saint Petersburg in the 82nd year of life. His paintings reside in State Russian Museum, in Art museums and private collections in Russia, France, England, Japan, in the U.S., and throughout the world.

In 1990s, after the death of the artist, his work has received recognition and aroused great interest abroad. He devoted two monographs published in the U.S. Exhibitions of his works were held in San Francisco (1998, 2000, 2001), Aspen (1999), New York (1999, 2001), Scottsdale (2000), Palm Beach (2000), Vail (2001), Washington (2001) and other cities. This brought the artist fame and glory of the "Russian Impressionist". One of the first Soviet artists, and perhaps the first landscape painter, he was listed in the West as one of the biggest painter of the 20th century. With the works of Nikolai Timkov for many Western art historians and art lovers began essentially a new discovery of Soviet-era art middle and second half of the 20th century.

In 2018 after a long break a large Nikolai Timkov's solo exhibition took place in St. Petersburg at the St Petersburg Artist Museum and Exhibition Center. An article for the album entitled Happy Timkov was written by Alexander Borovsky. Among the works presented at the exhibition were Crimea. Gurzuf (1955), Wyra (1956), On the Volga River (1957), Coast (1957), Academichka (1959), Leningrad Motive (1959), August. Academichka (1960), In the Morning (1960), Academicheskaya Dacha (1960), Backwater (1960), Academichka. A Field after harvesting (1960), Towards Fall (1960), Autumn. The Last Ray (1960), Mstino (1960), A Morning (1963), At the Old Ladoga (1963), A First Snow (1963), A Field (1964), Spring Creek (1964), Dacha (1964), Field (1965), A Spring (1967), A Field. First Snow (1967), Ural Landscape (1968), Torzhok (1968), Academicheskaya Dacha (1972), Summer (1973), In the vicinity of Academichka (1974), Academicheskaya Dacha (1975), Winter Day (1977), Khosta (1986), and others.

== Principal exhibitions ==
- 1951 (Leningrad): Exhibition of works by Leningrad artists of 1951
- 1954 (Leningrad): The Spring Exhibition of works by Leningrad artists of 1954
- 1955 (Leningrad): The Spring Exhibition of works by Leningrad artists of 1955
- 1956 (Leningrad): The Fall Exhibition of works by Leningrad artists of 1956
- 1957 (Leningrad): 1917–1957. Leningrad Artist's works of Art Exhibition
- 1957 (Moscow): All-Union Art Exhibition of 1957 dedicated to the 40th Anniversary of October Revolution
- 1958 (Leningrad): The Fall Exhibition of works by Leningrad artists of 1958
- 1960 (Leningrad): Exhibition of works by Leningrad artists of 1960
- 1960 (Leningrad): Exhibition of works by Leningrad artists of 1960
- 1961 (Leningrad): Exhibition of works by Leningrad artists of 1961
- 1962 (Leningrad): The Fall Exhibition of works by Leningrad artists of 1962
- 1964 (Leningrad): The Leningrad Fine Arts Exhibition
- 1965 (Leningrad): Spring Exhibition of works by Leningrad artists of 1965
- 1967 (Moscow): Soviet Russia the Third National Art Exhibition of 1967
- 1971 (Leningrad): Our Contemporary Exhibition of works by Leningrad artists of 1971
- 1972 (Leningrad): Our Contemporary The Second Exhibition of works by Leningrad artists of 1972
- 1972 (Leningrad): By Native Country Art Exhibition dedicated to 50th Anniversary of USSR
- 1975 (Leningrad): Our Contemporary regional exhibition of Leningrad artists of 1975
- 1976 (Moscow): The Fine Arts of Leningrad
- 1978 (Leningrad): The Fall Exhibition of works by Leningrad artists of 1978
- 1980 (Leningrad): Regional Art exhibition of Leningrad artists of 1980
- 1994 (Saint Petersburg): Paintings of 1950-1980s by the Leningrad School's artists
- 1994 (Saint Petersburg): Etude from the life in creativity of the Leningrad School artists
- 1994 (Pont-Audemer): Dessins, Gravures, Sculptures et Tableaux du XX siècle du fonds de l'Union des Artistes de Saint-Petersbourg
- 1995 (Saint Petersburg): Lyrical motifs in works of artists of the postwar generation
- 1996 (Saint Petersburg): Paintings of 1940-1990s. The Leningrad School
- 2013 (Saint Petersburg): Paintings of 1940–1980 by the Artists of the Leningrad School in ARKA Gallery
- 2018 (Saint Petersburg): Solo Exhibition at the St Petersburg Artist Museum and Exhibition Center.

== See also ==
- Russian Winter. Hoarfrost
- Fine Art of Leningrad
- Leningrad School of Painting
- List of Russian artists
- List of the Russian Landscape painters
- Saint Petersburg Union of Artists
- Academicheskaya Dacha

== Bibliography ==
- Выставка произведений ленинградских художников 1950 года. Каталог. М.-Л., Искусство, 1951. С.22.
- Выставка произведений ленинградских художников 1951 года. Каталог. Л., Лениздат, 1951. С.20.
- Весенняя выставка произведений ленинградских художников 1953 года. Каталог. Л., ЛССХ, 1953. С.8.
- Весенняя выставка произведений ленинградских художников 1954 года. Каталог. Л., Изогиз, 1954. С.19.
- Весенняя выставка произведений ленинградских художников 1955 года. Каталог. Л., ЛССХ, 1956. С.18.
- Осенняя выставка произведений ленинградских художников 1956 года. Каталог. Л., Ленинградский художник, 1958. С.24.
- 1917–1957. Выставка произведений ленинградских художников. Каталог. Л., Ленинградский художник, 1958. С.32.
- Всесоюзная художественная выставка, посвящённая 40-летию Великой Октябрьской социалистической революции. Каталог. М., Советский художник, 1957. С.78.
- Осенняя выставка произведений ленинградских художников 1958 года. Каталог. Л., Художник РСФСР, 1959. С.27.
- Выставка произведений ленинградских художников 1960 года. Каталог. Л., Художник РСФСР, 1963. С.18.
- Выставка произведений ленинградских художников 1960 года. Каталог. Л., Художник РСФСР, 1961. С.41-42.
- Республиканская художественная выставка Советская Россия. Каталог. М., Советский художник, 1960. С.82.
- Выставка произведений ленинградских художников 1961 года. Каталог. Л., Художник РСФСР, 1964. С.40.
- Осенняя выставка произведений ленинградских художников 1962 года. Каталог. Л., Художник РСФСР, 1962. С.26.
- Самуил Невельштейн, Николай Тимков. Выставка произведений. Живопись. Графика. Каталог. М., 1964.
- Работы двух художников // Вечерний Ленинград, 1964, 16 марта.
- В. Симоновская. Родина, её красота // Ленинградская правда, 1964, 18 марта.
- А. Яр-Кравченко. С открытой душой // Советская культура, 1964, 21 мая.
- Ленинград. Зональная выставка 1964 года. Каталог. Л, Художник РСФСР, 1965. C.55.
- Каталог весенней выставки произведений ленинградских художников 1965 года. Л., Художник РСФСР, 1970. С.29.
- Вторая республиканская художественная выставка Советская Россия. Каталог. М., Советский художник, 1965. С.38.
- Третья республиканская художественная выставка Советская Россия. Каталог. М., Министерство культуры РСФСР, 1967. С.56.
- Осенняя выставка произведений ленинградских художников 1968 года. Каталог. Л., Художник РСФСР, 1971. С.15.
- Наш современник. Каталог выставки произведений ленинградских художников 1971 года. Л., Художник РСФСР, 1972. С.21.
- По родной стране. Выставка произведений художников Ленинграда. 50-Летию образования СССР посвящается. Каталог. Л., Художник РСФСР, 1974. С.25.
- Николай Ефимович Тимков. Выставка произведений. Каталог. Л., Художник РСФСР, 1975.
- Наш современник. Зональная выставка произведений ленинградских художников 1975 года. Каталог. Л., Художник РСФСР, 1980. C.26.
- Пятая республиканская выставка Советская Россия. М., Советский художник, 1975. С.45.
- Изобразительное искусство Ленинграда. Каталог выставки. Л., Художник РСФСР, 1976. C.32.
- Exhibition of modern Soviet Painting. 1978. Gekkoso Gallery. Catalogue. Tokyo, 1978. Р.61.
- По Родной стране. Всероссийская художественная выставка. М., Советский художник, 1981. С.17.
- Художник — воин // Известия. 1982, 13 января.
- Выставка произведений ленинградских художников, посвящённая 60-летию Великого Октября. Л., Художник РСФСР, 1982. С.22.
- Осенняя выставка произведений ленинградских художников. 1978 года. Каталог. Л., Художник РСФСР, 1983. С.16.
- Справочник членов Союза художников СССР. Т.2. М., Советский художник, 1979. С.426.
- Зональная выставка произведений ленинградских художников 1980 года. Каталог. Л., Художник РСФСР, 1983. C.24.
- Леняшин В. Поиски художественной правды // Художник. 1981, № 1. С.8-17.
- Левандовский С. Живопись на Ленинградской зональной // Искусство. 1981, № 2. С.65.
- Справочник членов Ленинградской организации Союза художников РСФСР. Л., Художник РСФСР, 1987. С.130.
- Peinture Russe. Catalogue. Paris, Drouot Richelieu, 1991, 24 Septembre. Р.19.
- Peintures Russes — Русские художники. Catalogue. Bruxelles, Palais Des Beaux-Arts, 17 Fevrier, 1993. Р.55.
- Ленинградские художники. Живопись 1950–1980 годов. Каталог. СПб., 1994. С.4.
- Этюд в творчестве ленинградских художников. Выставка произведений. Каталог. СПб., 1994. С.6.
- Saint-Pétersbourg – Pont-Audemer. Dessins, Gravures, Sculptures et Tableaux du XX siècle du fonds de L' Union des Artistes de Saint-Pétersbourg. Pont-Audemer, 1994. PP.96, 100, 105, 110.
- Лирика в произведениях художников военного поколения. Выставка произведений. Каталог. СПб., 1995. С.6.
- Живопись 1940–1990 годов. Ленинградская школа. Выставка произведений. СПб., 1996. С.5.
- Связь времен. 1932–1997. Художники — члены Санкт-Петербургского Союза художников России. Каталог выставки. СПб., 1997. С.299.
- Matthew C. Bown. Dictionary of 20th Century Russian and Soviet Painters 1900-1980s. London, Izomar, 1998. ISBN 0-9532061-0-6, ISBN 978-0-9532061-0-0.
- The Seasons of Timkov. Master Russian Impressionist. The Pushkin Collection, 1998.
- Мы помним… Художники, искусствоведы — участники Великой Отечественной войны. М., Союз художников России, 2000. С.277.
- Academichka. The Academic Dacha through the eyes of Nikolai Timkov. The Pushkin Group and the Timkov Collection, 1999.
- Vern G. Swanson. Soviet Impressionism. Woodbridge, England, Antique Collectors' Club, 2001. P.29,47. ISBN 1-85149-280-1, ISBN 978-1-85149-280-0.
- Раскин А. Г. Живописец Николай Тимков //Петербургские искусствоведческие тетради. Вып. 3. СПб, 2001. С. 95—106.
- Time for change. The Art of 1960–1985 in the Soviet Union. Saint Petersburg, State Russian Museum, 2006. P.164.
- Sergei V. Ivanov. Unknown Socialist Realism. The Leningrad School. Saint Petersburg, NP-Print Edition, 2007. PP.9, 19-22, 24, 366, 389-396, 398-400, 402-406. ISBN 5-901724-21-6, ISBN 978-5-901724-21-7.
- Russian Fine & Decorative Art. Dallas, Texas, Heritage Auction Galleries. 2008, November 14. Р.24, 31, 33, 41, 46, 51, 59, 64-65, 69, 74, 77, 82-83, 120.
- Юбилейный Справочник выпускников Санкт-Петербургского академического института живописи, скульптуры и архитектуры имени И. Е. Репина Российской Академии художеств. 1915–2005. СПб., Первоцвет, 2007. С.51.
- Романычева И. Г. Академическая дача. История и традиции. СПб., Петрополь, 2009. С.16, 19, 57, 73-74, 124, 125.
- Иванов С. Инвестиции в советскую живопись: ленинградская школа // Петербургские искусствоведческие тетради. Вып. 31. СПб, 2014. С.54-60.
- Данилова А. Становление ленинградской школы живописи и её художественные традиции // Петербургские искусствоведческие тетради. Вып. 21. СПб, 2011. С.94—105.
- Боровский А. Тимков Николай Ефимович //Страницы памяти. Справочно-биографический сборник. 1941–1945. Художники Санкт-Петербургского (Ленинградского) Союза художников — ветераны Великой Отечественной войны. Кн.2. СПб, Петрополис, 2014. С.459-461.
- Nikolai Timkov. Album. Text by Alexander Borovsky. St Petersburg, St Petersburg Artist Publishing, 2018.
