= Dmitry Buchkin =

Russian painter (1927–2024)

- Дмитрий Бучкин
- Born: 23 July 1927; Leningrad, Russian SFSR, USSR
- Died: 7 December 2024 (aged 97); Saint Petersburg, Russia
- Education: Vera Mukhina Institute
- Known for: Painting
- Movement: Realism

Dmitry Petrovich Buchkin (Russian: Дмитрий Петрович Бучкин; 23 July 1927 – 7 December 2024) was a Soviet Russian painter, a member of the Saint Petersburg Union of Artists (before 1992 — the Leningrad Union of Artists), who lived and worked in Saint Petersburg. He is also regarded as one of the representatives of the Leningrad school of painting, being best known for his genre and landscape paintings.

Buchkin was born in Leningrad, USSR. In the 1960s and 1980s he repeatedly worked in the Staraya Ladoga House of Creativity. Later he worked in his own cottage with his art studio in Staraya Ladoga.

Buchkin died in Saint Petersburg on 7 December 2024, at the age of 97.

== See also ==
- Leningrad School of Painting
- House of creativity «Staraya Ladoga»
- List of 20th-century Russian painters
- List of painters of Saint Petersburg Union of Artists
- Saint Petersburg Union of Artists

== Sources ==
- Осенняя выставка произведений ленинградских художников 1956 года. Л., Ленинградский художник, 1958. С.8.
- 1917 — 1957. Выставка произведений ленинградских художников. Каталог. Л., Ленинградский художник, 1958. С.10.
- Осенняя выставка произведений ленинградских художников 1958 года. Каталог. Л., Художник РСФСР, 1959. С.8.
- Выставка произведений ленинградских художников 1960 года. Каталог. Л., Художник РСФСР, 1961. С.11.
- Осенняя выставка произведений ленинградских художников 1962 года. Каталог. Л., Художник РСФСР, 1962. С.9.
- Ленинград. Зональная выставка. Л., Художник РСФСР, 1965. С.13.
- Каталог весенней выставки произведений ленинградских художников 1965 года. Л., Художник РСФСР, 1970. С.10.
- Осенняя выставка произведений ленинградских художников 1968 года. Каталог. Л., Художник РСФСР, 1971. С.6.
- Выставка произведений ленинградских художников, посвящённая 25-летию победы над фашистской Германией. Каталог. Л., Художник РСФСР, 1972. С.6.
- Губарев А., Дмитренко А. В простом, казалось бы, мотиве ... // Вечерний Ленинград, 1971, 5 января.
- Весенняя выставка произведений ленинградских художников 1971 года. Каталог. Л., Художник РСФСР, 1972. С.8.
- Наш современник. Каталог выставки произведений ленинградских художников 1971 года. Л., Художник РСФСР, 1972. С.9.
- Осенняя выставка произведений ленинградских художников 1971 года. Каталог. Л., Художник РСФСР, 1973. С.5.
- Каталог Осенней выставки произведений ленинградских художников 1971 года. - Л: Художник РСФСР, 1973. - с.5.
- Художники народов СССР. Биобиблиографический словарь. Т.2. М., Искусство, 1972. С.129.
- Наш современник. Зональная выставка произведений ленинградских художников 1975 года. Каталог. Л., Художник РСФСР, 1980. С.12.
- Изобразительное искусство Ленинграда. Каталог выставки. Л., Художник РСФСР, 1976. С.16.
- Выставка произведений ленинградских художников, посвящённая 60-летию Великого Октября. Л., Художник РСФСР, 1982. С.12.
- Осенняя выставка произведений ленинградских художников. 1978 года. Каталог. Л., Художник РСФСР, 1983. С.6.
- Зональная выставка произведений ленинградских художников 1980 года. Каталог. — Л: Художник РСФСР, 1983. — с.11.
- Мы побратимы - сохраним мир. Третья совместная выставка произведений художников Ленинграда и Дрездена. - Дрезден: Бюро изобразительных искусств окружного совета Дрездена, 1986. - с.116,204.
- Справочник членов Ленинградской организации Союза художников РСФСР. - Л: Художник РСФСР, 1987. - с.20.
- L' École de Leningrad. Auction Catalogue. Paris, Drouot Richelieu, 16 Juin 1989. P.74-75.
- Peinture Russe. Catalogue. Paris, Drouot Richelieu, 18 Fevrier, 1991. P.7,18-19.
- Связь времён. 1932—1997. Художники — члены Санкт-Петербургского Союза художников России. Каталог выставки. СПб., 1997. С.284.
- Выставка произведений художников — ветеранов Великой Отечественной войны. СПб, 1998.
- Пётр Бучкин, Дмитрий Бучкин. Образы русского века. Живопись. - СПб, Галерея "Национальный Центр", 2000.
- Художники - городу. Выставка к 70-летию Санкт-Петербургского Союза художников. Каталог. - Санкт-Петербург: Петрополь, 2003. - с.179.
- Sergei V. Ivanov. Unknown Socialist Realism. The Leningrad School. Saint Petersburg, NP-Print Edition, 2007. P.15, 389, 395, 397, 402, 405-407, 444. ISBN 5-901724-21-6, ISBN 978-5-901724-21-7.
- Бучкин Д. П. Портреты петербургских художников. СПб., 2007.
- Художники Петровской Академии наук и искусств. — Санкт-Петербург: ИПП «Ладога», 2008. — с.34-35.
- Санкт-Петербургская государственная художественно-промышленная академия им. А. Л. Штиглица. Кафедра монументально-декоративной живописи. - СПб., Искусство России. 2011. С. 94.
