= Irina Dobrekova =

Russian painter (born 1931)

- Ирина Добрякова
- Born: 16 February 1931 (age 95); Leningrad, USSR
- Education: Vera Mukhina Institute
- Known for: Painting
- Movement: Realism

Irina Mikhailovna Dobrekova (Russian: Ирина Михайловна Добрякова; born 16 February 1931) is a Soviet and Russian painter and graphic artist. She is a member of the Saint Petersburg Union of Artists, regarded as a representative of the Leningrad school of painting.

== Early life ==
Irina Dobrekova was born on 16 February 1931, in Leningrad, USSR.

In 1961 she graduated from Vera Mukhina Higher School of Art and Industry in Alexander Kazantsev workshop, where she studied under Piotr Buchkin, Arseny Semionov, and Lev Chegorovsky.

Irina Dobrekova has participated in Art Exhibitions since 1965. She painted portraits, landscapes, still lifes, genre scenes, work in oil and tempera painting.

She replaced her art plein air style of 1950–1960 with inventing motives and interest to transfer of internal tension and latent drama in themes, where at first glance, nothing happens. Her 1980s still lifes is distinguished by bright intense color and sharp composition.

In 1972 Irina Dobrekova become a member of Saint Petersburg Union of Artists. From 1960 to 1970 she repeatedly worked in the House of creativity «Staraya Ladoga».

Her paintings reside in museums and private collections of Russia, France, Germany, Finland, in the U.S., England, and other countries.

== See also ==
- Leningrad School of Painting
- House of creativity «Staraya Ladoga»
- List of painters of Saint Petersburg Union of Artists
- Saint Petersburg Union of Artists

== Bibliography ==
- Весенняя выставка произведений ленинградских художников. 1965. Каталог. Л., Художник РСФСР, 1970. С.31.
- Весенняя выставка произведений ленинградских художников 1969 года. Каталог. Л., Художник РСФСР, 1970. С.19.
- Наш современник. Каталог выставки произведений ленинградских художников 1971 года. Л., Художник РСФСР, 1972. С.23.
- Каталог Осенней выставки произведений ленинградских художников 1971 года. Л., Художник РСФСР, 1973. С.17.
- По родной стране. Выставка произведений художников Ленинграда. 50 Летию образования СССР посвящается. Каталог. Л., Художник РСФСР, 1974. С.28.
- Наш современник. Вторая выставка произведений ленинградских художников 1972 года. Каталог. Л., Художник РСФСР, 1973. С.12.
- Натюрморт. Выставка произведений ленинградских художников 1973 года. Л., Художник РСФСР, 1973. С.13.
- Наш современник. Зональная выставка произведений ленинградских художников 1975 года. Каталог. Л., Художник РСФСР, 1980. С.28.
- Выставка произведений ленинградских художников, посвящённая 60-летию Великого Октября. Л., Художник РСФСР, 1982. С.24.
- Осенняя выставка произведений ленинградских художников. 1978 года. Каталог. Л., Художник РСФСР, 1983. С.8.
- Справочник членов Союза художников СССР. Т.2. М., Советский художник, 1979. С.541.
- Зональная выставка произведений ленинградских художников 1980 года. Каталог. Л., Художник РСФСР, 1983. С.13.
- Справочник членов Ленинградской организации Союза художников РСФСР. Л., Художник РСФСР, 1987. С.39.
- Ленинградские художники. Живопись 1950-1980 годов. Каталог. СПб., Выставочный центр ПСХ, 1994. С.3.
- Лирика в произведениях художников военного поколения. Выставка произведений. Каталог. СПб., Мемориальный музей Н. А. Некрасова, 1995. С.3.
- Sergei V. Ivanov. Unknown Socialist Realism. The Leningrad School. Saint Petersburg, NP-Print Edition, 2007. P.26, 106, 132, 360, 392, 395–399, 404, 405, 418, 422, 423. ISBN 5-901724-21-6, ISBN 978-5-901724-21-7.
