= Dmitry Belyaev (artist) =

Russian painter

Dmitry Vasilievich Belyaev
- Born: 18 November 1921; Ryazan Province, RSFSR
- Died: 25 September 2007 (aged 85); Saint Petersburg, Russia
- Education: Repin Institute of Arts
- Known for: Painting
- Movement: Realism
- Awards: Order of the Red Star; Order of the Patriotic War; Medal "For the Victory Over Germany"

Dmitry Vasilievich Belyaev (Russian: Дмитрий Васильевич Беляев, 18 November 1921, Ryazan Governorate – 25 September 2007, Saint Petersburg) was a Russian and Soviet painter, who lived and worked in Saint Petersburg (former Leningrad), an Honored Artist of the Russian Federation, a member of the Leningrad Union of Soviet Artists, regarded as one of representatives of the Leningrad School of Painting.

== Biography ==
Belyaev was born on 18 November 1921 in the village of Bortnoe, Rybnovskij district of the Ryazan Governorate, 18 kilometres from Ryazan city. In 1929, after the death of his mother, he moved to Moscow together with his father and other children. In Moscow he initially studied in a children's art studio, then at the Moscow Art School of the Memory of Revolution of 1905.

From the last course of the Moscow Art School he was drafted into the Red Army. A Member of the Great Patriotic War, he fought in the Southwestern Front and 2nd Ukrainian Front as a tankman. He has wounded, marked by military awards.

In 1952 Belyaev graduated from the Department of Painting of the Repin Institute of Arts, where he studied of Boris Ioganson, Genrikh Pavlovsky, Alexander Zaytsev, Semion Abugov. His graduate work was a genre picture entitled "For Peace!".

Since 1952 Belyaev begins to participate in art exhibitions. He painted portraits, genre and historical composition, landscapes, still lifes. In 1952 he was admitted to the Leningrad Union of Soviet Artists. In 1970-1980s Belyaev was a head of creative groups of artists in the House of creativity «Staraya Ladoga» in Staraya Ladoga. In 1998 he was awarded the honorary title of the Honored Artist of the Russian Federation. In 2004 Dmitry Belyaev was awarded the Prize of the St. Petersburg government in the field of literature, art and architecture for his paintings of recent years. In 2005 he became a laureate of State Prize of Repin. He was a full member of Peter's Academy of Arts and Sciences.

Dmitry Vasilievich Belyaev died in Saint Petersburg on 25 September 2007, at the age of 86. His paintings reside in Russian museum, in Art museums and private collections in Russia, Finland, in the U.S., Japan, Germany, France, and other countries.

== See also ==
- Leningrad School of Painting
- House of creativity «Staraya Ladoga»
- List of 20th-century Russian painters
- List of painters of Saint Petersburg Union of Artists
- Saint Petersburg Union of Artists

== Sources ==
- Коровкевич C. Ярче и глубже показывать новое, передовое. Заметки о весенней выставке работ ленинградских художников // Вечерний Ленинград, 1954, 12 июня.
- Серов В. Знать жизнь, показывать правду жизни // Ленинградский альманах. Кн. 8. Л., Лениздат, 1954. С.306-311.
- Серебряный И. Молодые живописцы // Ленинградский альманах. Кн. 9. Л., Лениздат, 1954. С.338-342.
- Никифоров Б. Черты нового в жанровой картине наших дней // Искусство. 1958, № 2. С.9-18.
- Прытков В. Новые работы советских пейзажистов // Искусство. 1958, № 2. С.19-28.
- Выставка произведений ленинградских художников 1960 года. Каталог. — Л: Художник РСФСР, 1963. — с.7.
- Выставка произведений ленинградских художников 1961 года. Каталог. — Л: Художник РСФСР, 1964. — с.10.
- Ленинград. Зональная выставка. — Л: Художник РСФСР, 1965. — с.11.
- Старостин Г. Художники советуются со зрителем. // Смена, 1965, 8 декабря.
- Третья республиканская художественная выставка «Советская Россия». Каталог. — М: Министерство культуры РСФСР, 1967. — с.18.
- Губарев А., Дмитренко А. В простом, казалось бы, мотиве … // Вечерний Ленинград, 1971, 5 января.
- Directory of Members of the Union of Artists of USSR. Vol. 1. - Moscow: Soviet artist, 1979. P.116.
- Наш современник. Зональная выставка произведений ленинградских художников 1975 года. Каталог. — Л: Художник РСФСР, 1980. — с.12.
- Пятая республиканская выставка «Советская Россия». — М: Советский художник, 1975. — с.7.
- Зональная выставка произведений ленинградских художников 1980 года. Каталог. — Л: Художник РСФСР, 1983. — с.10.
- Directory of members of the Leningrad branch of Union of Artists of Russian Federation. - Leningrad: Khudozhnik RSFSR, 1987. P.13.
- Выставка произведений художников — ветеранов Великой Отечественной войны. — Л: ЛОСХ РСФСР, 1987. — с.3.
- Дмитрий Васильевич Беляев. Выставка произведений. Каталог. — Л: Художник РСФСР, 1988.
- Выставка произведений художников — участников Великой Отечественной войны Санкт-Петербургского Союза художников России. — Санкт-Петербург: ПСХ, 1993. — с.3.
- Matthew Cullerne Bown. A Dictionary of Twentieth Century Russian And Soviet Painters. 1900 — 1980s. — London: Izomar Limited, 1998.
- Выставка, посвященная 55-летию победы в Великой Отечественной войне. СПб, 2000. С. 3.
- Мы помним… Художники, искусствоведы — участники Великой Отечественной войны. — М: Союз художников России, 2000. — с.40.
- Художники — городу. Выставка к 70-летию Санкт-Петербургского Союза художников. Каталог. — Петрополь, 2003. — с.31, 178.
- Sergei V. Ivanov. Unknown Socialist Realism. The Leningrad School. Saint Petersburg, NP-Print Edition, 2007. P.9, 389, 393, 395, 397—401, 403—407, 445. ISBN 5-901724-21-6, ISBN 978-5-901724-21-7.
- Юбилейный Справочник выпускников Санкт-Петербургского академического института живописи, скульптуры и архитектуры имени И. Е. Репина Российской Академии художеств. 1915—2005. — Санкт Петербург: «Первоцвет», 2007. — с.67.
- Академическая дача. Каталог выставки. — Санкт-Петербург: Санкт-Петербургский Союз художников, 2009. — с.4,10.
- Дмитрий Беляев // Альманах. Вып. 293. СПб, Palace Editions, 2010. ISBN 978-5-93332-359-4.
