= Boris Ugarov =

Russian painter

- Борис Угаров
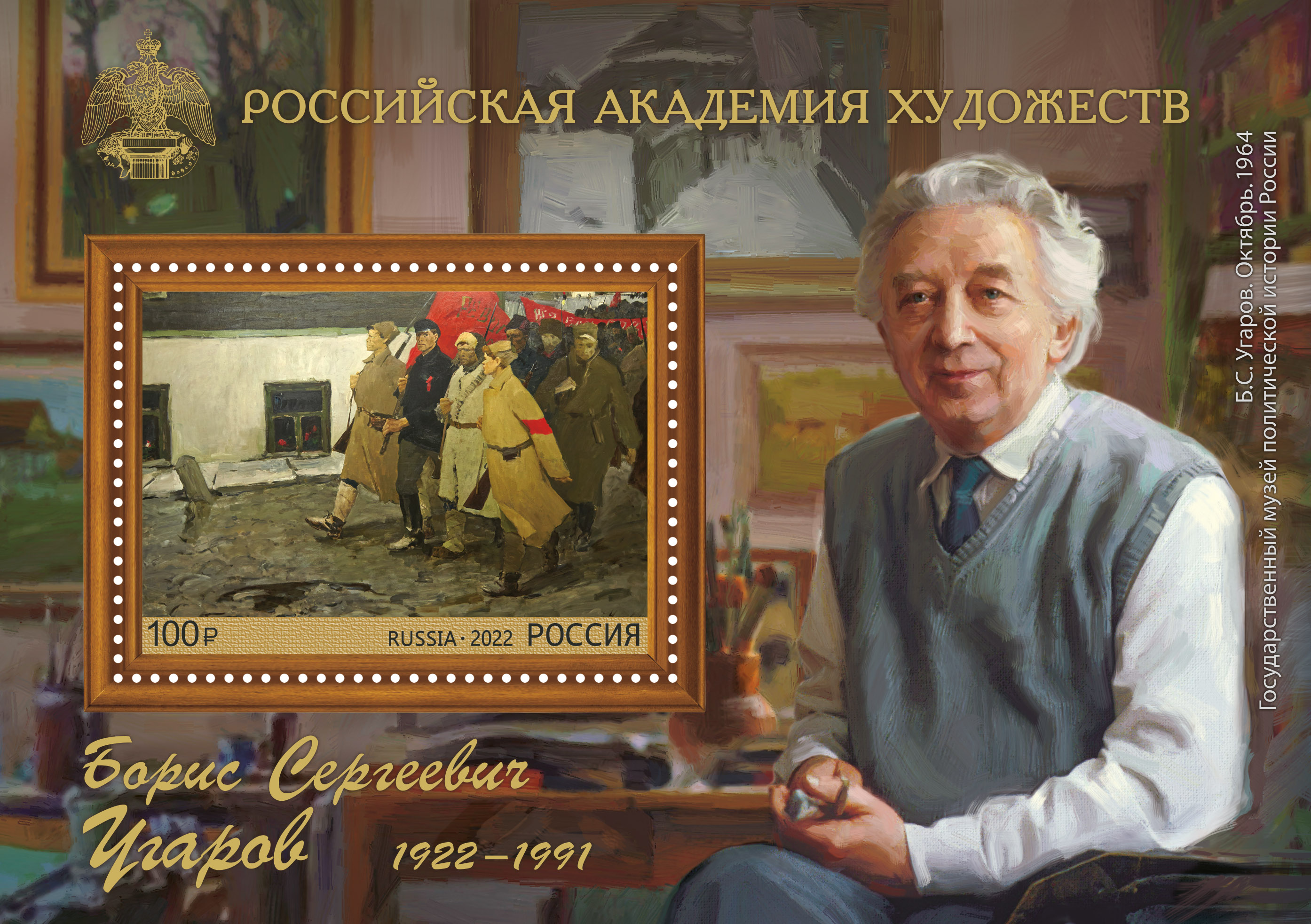
- Ugarov and his work Oktyabr (1964) on a 2022 stamp sheet of Russia
- Born: 6 February 1922; Petrograd, Soviet Russia
- Died: 2 August 1991 (aged 69); Leningrad, USSR
- Resting place: Literatorskiye Mostki, Saint Petersburg
- Education: Repin Institute of Arts
- Known for: Painting, Graphics
- Movement: Realism
- Awards: People's Artist of the Russian Federation; People's Artist of the USSR

Boris Sergeevich Ugarov (Russian: Бори́с Серге́евич Уга́ров; 6 February 1922 – 2 August 1991) was a Russian Soviet realist painter and art educator, Honored Artist of the RSFSR, who lived and worked in Leningrad. He was a member of the Leningrad Union of Artists regarded as one of the brightest representatives of the Leningrad school of painting.

== Biography ==
Ugarov was born in Petrograd in 1922. At the onset of the Great Patriotic War, he volunteered in the militia. He then served as an artilleryman, gunner, took part in battles in the Leningrad and Volkhov fronts, in Karelia and on the Far East. He was awarded several bravery and campaign medals.

After demobilization in 1945 he entered the Leningrad Institute of Painting, Sculpture and Architecture named after Ilya Repin, where he studied of Victor Oreshnikov and Andrei Mylnikov. In 1951 Boris Ugarov graduated from the Repin Institute of Arts in Igor Grabar workshop with the rank of artist of painting. His degree work was a painting titled "Spring on the collective farm".

In 1951–1954 Ugarov engaged in postgraduate institute under the leadership of Alexander Gerasimov. In 1952 he began to teach at the Repin Institute. In the same year he became a member of the Leningrad Union of Artists. Starting in 1951, Boris Ugarov participated in Art Exhibitions. He painted genre and historical paintings, portraits and landscapes. In 1975–1979 Ugarov headed the Leningrad Union of Artists. In 1977 he was appointed rector of the Repin Institute of Arts. In 1978 he was elected a member of the USSR Academy of Arts. In 1982 Boris Ugarov was awarded the honorary title of the People's Artist of the USSR. In 1983 he was elected President of the USSR Academy of Arts, occupying this post until 1991.

Ugarov died on 2 August 1991 in Saint Petersburg at the age of seventy. His paintings reside in State Russian Museum, State Tretyakov Gallery, in art museums and private collections in Russia, Japan, Ukraine, France, England, Germany, Italy, in the U.S., and others.

== Honours and awards ==
- People's Artist of the USSR (1982)
- USSR State Prize (1985) – for his film "Renaissance" (1980)
- Repin State Prize of the RSFSR (1976) – for the picture "In the land of freedom", "June 1941", "Earth"
- Order of the Patriotic War, 2nd class (1985)
- Order of the Red Star
- Medal "For the Victory over Germany in the Great Patriotic War 1941–1945"
- Medal "For the Victory over Japan"
- Medal "For Battle Merit"

== See also ==
- Fine Art of Leningrad
- List of Russian artists
- List of 20th-century Russian painters
- List of painters of Saint Petersburg Union of Artists
- Saint Petersburg Union of Artists
- Academicheskaya Dacha
