= Olga Kifyak =

Ukrainian ballet dancer

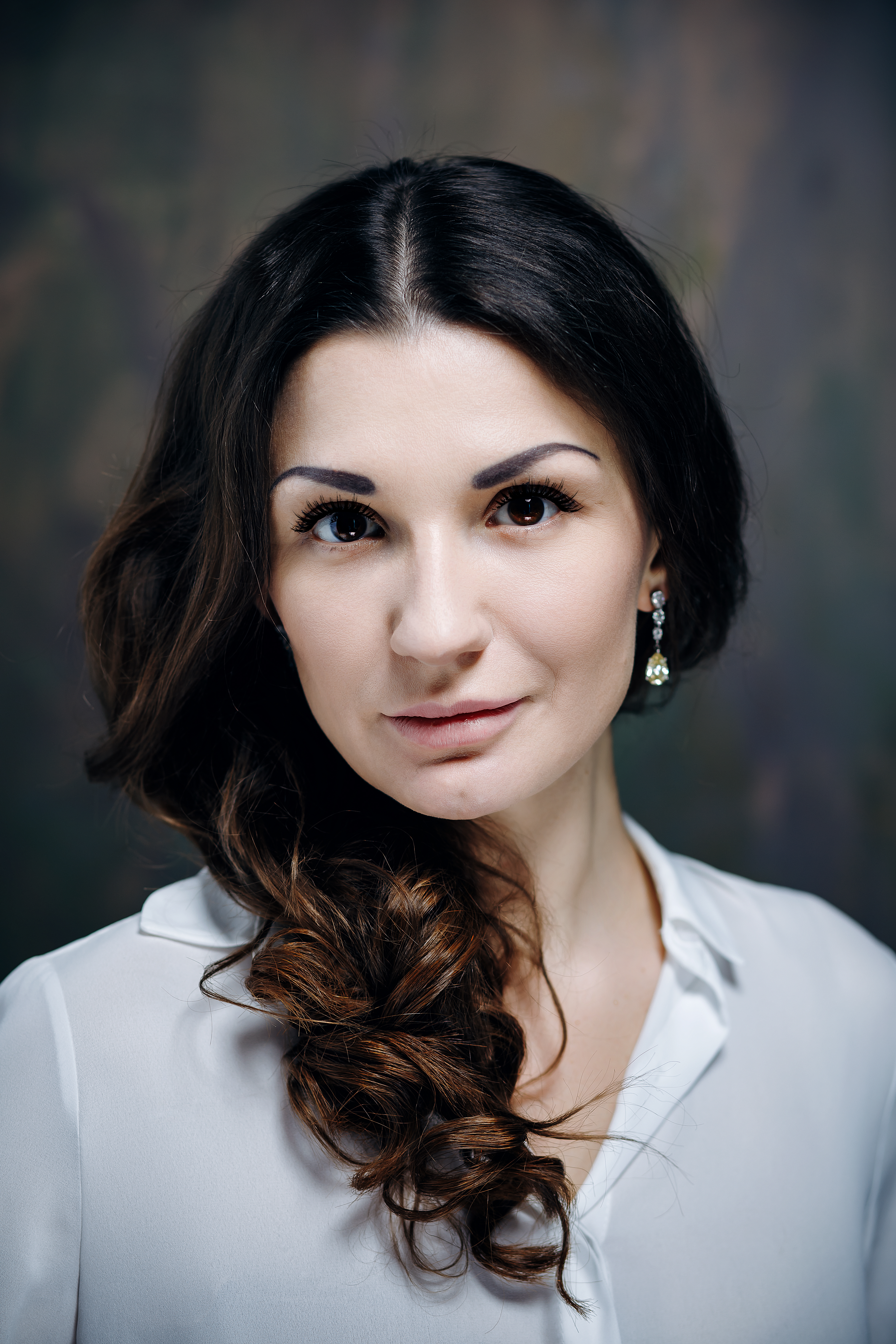
- Born: Olga Kifyak; 24 April 1984 (age 42); Kiev, Ukrainian Soviet Socialist Republic
- Occupation: Ballet dancer
- Years active: 2001–present
- Career
- Current group: National Opera of Ukraine

Olga Kifyak (Ukrainian: Ольга Петровна Кіфяк, Russian: Ольга Петровна Кифяк, born 24 April 1984) is a Ukrainian ballet dancer, the 1-st soloist at the National Academic Opera and Ballet Theater named after T.G. Shevchenko (since 2001). Merited Artist of Ukraine since 2012.

== Early life and training ==
Was born in Kiev, the Soviet Union in 1984. She began her dance studies at the age of 5. In 1995 she entered the Kiyanochka choreographic school. At the age of 14, she entered the Ukrainian Academy of Dance (under the guidance of A. Kalchenko, Merited Artist of Ukraine. Founder of the Ukrainian Academy of Ballet.) In 2001 she graduated from the Academy with a degree in choreography, qualified as a ballet dancer. In the same year, she received a diploma of the International Slavic University with a degree in choreography. In 2002 she entered the Kherson State University. In 2006 she graduated from the university with the qualification of a teacher of choreography, aesthetics, artistic culture. Since 2001 she has been working at the National Academic Opera and Ballet Theater of Ukraine named after. T.G. Shevchenko. Her first dance at the theater was as Paquita with Mikheev.

== Awards ==
- Winner of the 4th International Competition Dance of the 21st Century (April 2000)
- Winner of the contest-festival Lotus (March 2001)
- Winner of the 4th International Competition (Vienna, Austria) - Diploma (April 2001)
- Winner of the 1sr International Festival of Vaslav Nijinsky (March 2001)
- Winner of the 4th International Ballet Competition of Serge Lifar – 3rd Prize (May 2002)
- Winner of the 5th International Competition (Vienna, Austria) – 2nd Prize (April 2004)
- Winner of the International Competition Premio Roma – 1st Prize (July 2004)
- Winner of the 7th International Festival-Competition (Dance of the 21st Century) – 1st prize for classical dance, 1st prize - modern (April 2004)
- Winner of the 1st International Competition of Yuri Grigorovich Young Ballet of the World – 3rd Prize (September 2006)
- Winner of the 6th International Ballet Competition of Serge Lifar - 2nd Prize (April 2006)

== Repertoire ==
The repertoire includes the largest works of classical ballet, as well as many roles in modern ballets. Critics say that "Olga Kifyak was born to dance and in a short time has become principal ballerina par excellence. From the dramatic to the lyrical to the tricks of a master, Kifyak has it all – public accolades and professional awards". "A graduate of the Ukrainian Academy of Dance in Kyiv, Kifyak held the audience's attention throughout the score, moving the tragic story along with her incredible footwork and graceful arm sweeps. Kifyak's small frame disguised a powerful repertoire that included standing on tiptoe for minutes at a time."
Critics call her acting "superb, her extensions in the pas de deux sky-high and her 32 fouettes razor-sharp"

=== Roles performed ===
- La Bayadère - Gamzatti
- Don Quixote - Kitri, Street Dancer
- Swan Lake - Odette and Odile
- Raymonda - Friends
- Scheherazade – Zobeide
- Spartacus in the choreography of V.Litvinov and A.I.Litvinov – Aegina
- The Nutcracker - Clara (Masha)
- Carmen Suite by R. Shchedrin - Carmen
- The Corsair - Medora, Gulnara
- Sleeping Beauty – Aurora
- Lilea by K. Dankevich - Rusalka
- Forest Song by Mikhail Skorulsky - Mavka
- Viennese Waltz - Carla
- Paquita grand pas classique - Paquita
- The Legend of Love - Gold
- Master and Margarita - Margarita
- Daniella - Sophie
- Snow White - Snow White
- Giselle - Myrtha, Pas de deux
- Copel – Swanilda
- The Marriage of Figaro - Susanna
- Zorba the Greek - Marina
- The Snow Queen - Crow
- Julius Caesar - Kithridia
- Dance of the Hours - Laura
- Scheherazade - Zobeida choreographed by A.G.Isupova
- Once Upon a Summer, choreographed by N. Didyk
- Lonely Tango choreographed by T.Ostroverh

== Participation in festivals ==
- International Festival Young Talents, Prague, Czech Republic (April 1999);
- 3rd International Festival Dance of the 21st Century (April 2000);
- Choreographic Festival Lotus (March 2001);
- 1st International Festival of Vaslav Nijinsky (March 2001);
- International Festival Stars of the World Ballet (Mexico City, Mexico, March 2003);
- International Festival Stars of the Ukrainian Ballet (March 2004);
- In 2004 she went on tour with former Bolshoi Theatre Prima Ballerina Anastasia Volochkova;
- Took part in The Galla of Svetlana Zakharova, Parma, Italy (October 2006);
- International Festival Stars of the World Ballet (Mexico City, Mexico, 2006);
- Guest Ballerina in The Nutcracker, Kazan (February 25, 2007);
- Stars of the World Ballet, Milan, Italy (March 2008);
- Stars of the World Ballet, Milan, Italy (April 2009);
- The Galla of Svetlana Zakharova, Parma, Italy (May 2008);
- International Festival Stars of the World Ballet (Mexico City, Mexico, January 2009);
- The Galla of Svetlana Zakharova, Belgrade, Serbia (March 2009);
- The Galla of Svetlana Zakharova, Tokyo, Japan (May 2009);
- The Galla of Svetlana Zakharova, Barcelona, Spain
- In 2012, she went on the United States's tour with The Nutcracker.
- In 2014, she took part in the ballet Carmen choreographed by Nadezhda Kalinina. She went on tour in France with a Gala Concert Operamania in collaboration with Franceconcert.
- From 2015 to 2017, went on the United States’s tour performing as a guest soloist with the ballet Swan Lake
- In 2017, she was invited to Milan to take part in the Swan Lake ballet in conjunction with the Ukrainian Academy of Ballet.
- In 2017, went on tour in China with the ballet Swan Lake;
- In 2018, went on tour in India with the ballet Swan Lake.
