= List of Russian landscape painters =

This is a list of landscape painters of the Russian Federation, Soviet Union, and Russian Empire, both ethnic Russians and people of other ethnicities. This list also includes painters who were born in Russia but later emigrated, and those born elsewhere but immigrated to the country and/or worked there for a long time. Artists are arranged in chronological order within the alphabetical tables. The basis for inclusion in this List can serve as the recognition of the artistic community, confirmed by authoritative sources, as well as the presence of article about the artist in Wikipedia.

For the full list of Russian artists in Wikipedia, see Category:Russian artists.

== Alphabetical list ==
=== A ===
Portrait	Person	
	Ivan Aivazovsky (1817–1900); Russian Empire (Armenian descent) seascape and landscape painter, portraitist (self-portrait, 1873)	The Ninth Wave, 1850
	Fyodor Alekseyev (1753–1824); Russian Empire cityscape and landscape painter	Red Square in Moscow, 1801

=== B ===
Portrait	Person	
	Vsevolod Bazhenov (1908–1986); Russian Empire; Soviet Union landscape and seascape painter	
	Zlata Bizova (1927–2013); Soviet Union landscape and genre painter	
	Konstantin Bogaevsky (1872–1943); Russian Empire; Soviet Union symbolist landscape painter	Ships. Evening sun, 1912
	Alexey Bogolyubov (1824–1896); Russian Empire landscape and seascape painter	Smolny as seen from Bolshaya Okhta, 1851
	Aleksandr Borisov (1866–1934); Russian Empire; Soviet Union landscape painter	Murmansk harbour in March, 1896
	Veniamin Borisov (1935–2014); Soviet Union; Russian Federation landscape and sityscape painter	
	Victor Borisov-Musatov (1870–1905); Russian Empire symbolist painter (self-portrait with sister, 1898)	Spring, 1898-1901
	Boris F. Borzin (1923–1991); Soviet Union; Russian Federation landscape, genre, portrait and still life painter	Oil on canvas. Soviet art, realism school. Leningrad artists.

=== C ===
Portrait	Person	
	Grigory Chernetsov (1802–1865); Russian Empire landscape, portrait, genre painter	The parade in the Kremlin in 1838, 1841
	Evgeny Chuprun (1927–2005); Soviet Union; Russian Federation seascape, landscape, and genre painter	

=== D ===
Portrait	Person	
	Nikolai Dubovskoy (1859–1918); Russian Empire landscape painter	Silence, 1890

=== E ===
Portrait	Person
	Alexei Eriomin (1918–1998); Soviet Union; Russian Federation landscape and genre painter

=== G ===
Portrait	Person
	Nikolai Galakhov (born 1928); Soviet Union; Russian Federation landscape painter
	Ivan Godlevsky (1908–1998); Soviet Union; Russian Federation landscape painter
	Vasily Golubev (1925–1985); Soviet Union landscape painter

=== K ===
Portrait	Person	
	Mikhail Kaneev (1923–1983); Soviet Union cityscape and landscape painter	
	Yuri Khukhrov (1932–2003); Soviet Union; Russian Federation portrait, cityscape and landscape painter	
	Sergei Kolyada (1907–1996); Russian Empire; Soviet Union; Russian Federation cityscape, still life, portrait and landscape painter (self portrait, 1965)	
	Alexander Koroviakov (1912–1993); Russian Empire; Soviet Union; Russian Federation cityscape, still life, and landscape painter	
	Konstantin Korovin (1861–1932); Russian Empire; France impressionist painter (portrait by Valentin Serov, 1891)	Arkhangelsk Port on Dvina, 1894
	Mikhail Kozell (1911–1993); Russian Empire; Soviet Union; Russian Federation landscape painter	
	Simon Kozhin (born 1979); Russian Federation; Landscape, portrait, stilllife, genre painter	Ferapontov Monastery.., 2003
	Marina Kozlovskaya (1925–2019); Soviet Union; Russian Federation portrait and landscape painter	
	Arkhip Kuindzhi (1842–1910); Russian Empire (Greek descent) landscape painter (portrait by Viktor Vasnetsov, 1869)	The Ladoga Lake, 1873

=== L ===
Portrait	Person	
	Lev Lagorio (1828–1905); Russian Empire landscape and seascape painter	On the Caucasus Mountains, 1879
	Isaac Levitan (1860–1900); Russian Empire (Jewish descent) landscape painter (self-portrait, 1880)	Birch Forest, 1885-1889
	Piotr Litvinsky (1927–2009); Soviet Union; Russian Federation landscape and history painter	

=== M ===
Portrait	Person	
	Dmitry Maevsky (1917–1992); Russian Empire; Soviet Union; Russian Federation landscape painter	
	Fyodor Matveyev (1758–1826); Russian Empire classicist landscape painter	The Colosseum in Rome
	Nikolai Mukho (1913–1986); Russian Empire; Soviet Union landscape and genre painter	

=== N ===
Portrait	Person	
	Mikhail Nesterov (1862–1942); Russian Empire; Soviet Union religious symbolist painter, portraitist (portrait by Viktor Vasnetsov)	The Vision of the Youth Bartholomew, 1890–91
	Alexander Naumov (1935–2010); Soviet Union; Russian Federation genre and landscape painter	
	Samuil Nevelshtein (1903–1983); Russian Empire; Soviet Union landscape and portrait painter	
	Anatoli Nenartovich (1915–1988); Russian Empire; Soviet Union landscape and cityscape painter	

=== O ===
Portrait	Person
	Vladimir Ovchinnikov (1911–1978); Russian Empire; Soviet Union landscape painter
	Sergei Osipov (1915–1985); Russian Empire; Soviet Union landscape and still life painter

=== P ===
Portrait	Person	
	Vasily Polenov (1844–1927); Russian Empire; Soviet Union landscape painter, realist (portrait by Ilya Repin)	A courtyard in Moscow, 1878
	Evgeny Pozdniakov (1923–1991); Soviet Union landscape painter	

=== R ===
Portrait	Person	
	Nicholas Roerich (1874–1947); Russian Empire landscape painter (portrait by Svetoslav Roerich, 1944)	Guests from Overseas, 1901
	Arkady Rylov (1870–1939); Russian Empire; Soviet Union landscape painter (Self portrait, 1939)	In the Blue Expanse, 1918

=== S ===
Portrait	Person	
	Gleb Savinov (1915–2000); Russian Empire; Soviet Union; Russian Federation landscape, cityscape, and genre painter	
	Alexei Savrasov (1830–1897); Russian Empire lyrical landscape painter (portrait by Iosif Volkov)	Rooks returned, 1871
	Alexander Semionov (1922–1984); Soviet Union cityscape and landscape painter	
	Arseny Semionov (1911–1992); Soviet Union; Russian Federation landscape, genre, and still life painter	
	Sylvester Shchedrin (1791–1830); Russian Empire neoclassical landscape painter (self-portrait, 1817)	Lake of Albano, 1825
	Ivan Shishkin (1832–1898); Russian Empire landscape painter (portrait by Ivan Kramskoi, 1880)	Morning in a Pine Forest, 1886
	Grigory Soroka (1823–1864); Russian Empire landscape painter, portraitist (self-portrait)	Dam in Spasskoye, 1840s
	Sergey Svetoslavsky (1857–1931); Russian Empire; Soviet Union cityscape painter	The backyard, 1900s

=== T ===
Portrait	Person
	German Tatarinov (1925–2006); Soviet Union; Russian Federation landscape painter
	Nikolai Timkov (1912–1993); Russian Empire; Soviet Union; Russian Federation landscape painter
	Victor Teterin (1922–1991); Soviet Union landscape, genre, and still life painter
	Leonid Tkachenko (born 1927); Soviet Union; Russian Federation landscape, genre, and still life painter
	Vitaly Tulenev (1937–1998); Soviet Union; Russian Federation landscape and genre painter

=== V ===
Portrait	Person	
	Anatoli Vasiliev (1917–1994); Russian Empire; Soviet Union; Russian Federation landscape and genre painter	
	Fyodor Vasilyev (1850–1873); Russian Empire lyrical landscape painter (self-portrait, 1873)	After a Thunderstorm, 1868
	Apollinary Vasnetsov (1856–1933); Russian Empire; Soviet Union history painter, stage designer (portrait by Viktor Vasnetsov, 1890)	Kama river, 1895
	Viktor Vasnetsov (1848–1926); Russian Empire; Soviet Union mythology and history painter, Russian Revival style artist (self-portrait, 1868)	Flying Carpet, 1880
	Maxim Vorobiev (1787–1855); Russian Empire landscape painter	Sphinxes lining a quay in front of St Petersburg Academy of Arts, 1835

== See also ==
- List of Russian artists
- List of 19th-century Russian painters
- List of 20th-century Russian painters
- List of painters of Saint Petersburg Union of Artists
- Russian culture

== Sources ==
- Fedorov-Davidov А. А. Soviet landscape painting. - Moscow: Iskusstvo, 1958.
- Fedorov-Davidov A. A. Russian landscape painting. - Moscow: Izobrazitelnoe Iskusstvo, 1962.
- Sitnina М. К. The Seasons of year. Russian landscape painting. - Moscow: Iskusstvo, 1969.
- Artists of peoples of the USSR. Biobibliography Dictionary. Vol. 1. - Moscow: Iskusstvo, 1970.
- Artists of peoples of the USSR. Biobibliography Dictionary. Vol. 2. - Moscow: Iskusstvo, 1972.
- Fine Arts of the Leningrad. Exhibition Catalogue. - Leningrad: Khudozhnik RSFSR, 1976.
- Directory of Members of Union of Artists of USSR. Vol. 1,2. - Moscow: Soviet Artist Edition, 1979.
- Directory of Members of the Leningrad branch of the Union of Artists of Russian Federation. - Leningrad: Khudozhnik RSFSR, 1980.
- Artists of peoples of the USSR. Biobibliography Dictionary. Vol. 4 Book 1. - Moscow: Iskusstvo, 1983.
- Directory of Members of the Leningrad branch of the Union of Artists of Russian Federation. - Leningrad: Khudozhnik RSFSR, 1987.
- Artists of peoples of the USSR. Biobibliography Dictionary. Vol. 4 Book 2. - Saint Petersburg: Academic project humanitarian agency, 1995.
- Link of Times: 1932 - 1997. Artists - Members of Saint Petersburg Union of Artists of Russia. Exhibition catalogue. - Saint Petersburg: Manezh Central Exhibition Hall, 1997.
- Matthew C. Bown. Dictionary of 20th Century Russian and Soviet Painters 1900-1980s. - London: Izomar, 1998.
- Matthew C. Bown. Socialist Realist Painting. - Yale Press, 1998.
- Maltseva F. Masters of Russian landscape painting of second half of XIX century. - Moscow: Iskusstvo, 1999.
- Vern G. Swanson. Soviet Impressionism. - Woodbridge, England: Antique Collectors' Club, 2001.
- Sergei V. Ivanov. Unknown Socialist Realism. The Leningrad School. - Saint Petersburg: NP-Print Edition, 2007. - ISBN 5-901724-21-6, ISBN 978-5-901724-21-7.
- Anniversary Directory graduates of Saint Petersburg State Academic Institute of Painting, Sculpture, and Architecture named after Ilya Repin, Russian Academy of Arts. 1915 - 2005. - Saint Petersburg: Pervotsvet Publishing House, 2007.
- Igor N. Pishny. The Leningrad School of painting. Socialist realism of 1930-1980s: Selected names. – Saint Petersburg: Kolomenskaya versta, 2008. - ISBN 978-5-91555-005-5.
- Irina Romanycheva. Academic Dacha. History and traditions. - Saint Petersburg: Petropol Publishing House, 2009.
