= World Ballet Series =

Ballet program

World Ballet Series is a ballet program of the World Ballet Company, a touring ballet company, based in Los Angeles.

== History ==
The World Ballet Series was created as a part of the World Ballet Company, and founded in 2015 by Sasha Gorskaya and Gulya Hartwick.

World Ballet Series' roster includes professional dancers from more than ten countries around the world, including Japan, Germany, United Kingdom, Russia, Ukraine, Belarus, Kyrgyzstan, Poland, South Korea, Armenia, and Slovenia. World Ballet Series includes three original ballet productions based on the classic story and presents it across the United States. The shows are produced by Gorskaya-Hartwick Productions, which is led by Sasha Gorskaya and Gulya Hartwick.

For the 2023-24 tour, the World Ballet Series presented a repertoire consisting of Swan Lake, The Nutcracker, and Cinderella.

Over the years, the World Ballet Series has visited over 280 cities, reaching an audience of more than 250,000 people.

== Ballet shows ==
=== Cinderella ===
The ballet Cinderella, which is part of the World Ballet Series, is being performed by a cast of 40 professional dancers from various countries. The choreography is by Marina Kesler, and the production features music composed by Sergei Prokofiev. The sets are hand-painted, following 100-year old tradition of theatrical scenery making, and the performance includes approximately 150 costumes that are hand-sewn.

=== The Nutcracker ===
The Nutcracker is based on a fairy tale by Hoffman and brings the story to life through Tchaikovsky's music combined with Marius Petipa's choreography. The production also includes Lev Ivanov's original choreography, complemented by additional staging from George Birkadze and Marina Kesler. Sergey Novikov designed the scenery and costumes, while Mark Stavtsev handled the lighting design. The show is produced by Gorskaya-Hartwick Productions.

=== Swan Lake ===
Swan Lake features sets with hand-painted elements and costumes that are handmade. The choreography is based on Marius Petipa's original work, with additions and changes made by Nadezhda Kalinina. The music is composed by Pyotr Ilyich Tchaikovsky. Gorskaya-Hartwick Productions stages the ballet.

== Selected ballet shows ==
- Swan Lake
- The Nutcracker
- Cinderella
