= Shchedrin =

Shchedrin (Щедрин) is a Russian surname. Notable people with the surname include:

- Grigori Shchedrin (1912–1995), Soviet submariner
- Mikhail Saltykov-Shchedrin (1826–1889), Russian writer
- Rodion Shchedrin (1932–2025), Soviet and Russian composer and pianist
- Semyon Shchedrin (1745–1804), Russian painter
- Sylvester Shchedrin (1791–1830), Russian painter

== See also ==
- Shchadryn, an agrotown in Gomel Region, Belarus
- 4625 Shchedrin, an asteroid
