= Fyodor Matveyev =

Russian landscape painter (1758–1826)

- Фёдор Михайлович Матвеев
- Born: 1758; Russian Empire
- Died: 1826; Italy
- Education: Member Academy of Arts (1807)
- Alma mater: Imperial Academy of Arts (1779)
- Known for: Painting
- Awards: Big Gold Medal of the Imperial Academy of Arts (1779)

Fyodor Mikhaylovich Matveyev (Russian: Фёдор Михайлович Матвеев; 1758–1826) was a Russian classicist landscape painter, most recognizable for his Italian landscapes. He was one of the first Russian landscape painters.

== Biography ==
Matveyev was a son of a soldier of the Izmaylovsky Regiment. He was admitted to the Imperial Academy of Arts, where he graduated from in 1778 with a Grand Gold medal. One of his professors was Semyon Shchedrin. Matveyev specialized from the very beginning as a landscape painter and became the first landscape artist graduated with a gold medal. He was subsequently awarded a fellowship to travel to Europe, as was common at the time for talented graduates of the Academy. In 1779, Matveyev travelled to Italy and eventually settled there. He never returned to Russia and died in Italy in 1826.

Matveyev travelled back and forth in Italy and surrounding countries, painting landscapes. Initially, he had commissions from Russian nobles residing in Italy. Eventually, the commissions thinned out, and Matveyev wrote letters to the Imperial Academy of Arts in 1789 and 1795, asking to subsidize his return to Russia. Apparently, he did not receive any reply. In 1806, he sent his painting View around Naples to the Academy and was awarded the title of the academician.

He created oil paintings as well as a number of graphic works. Most of the paintings are made according to the strict rules of classicism, meaning the image is similar to the theater scene, with buildings or trees at the sides. There are always people present in the landscape, to indicate the scale. Landscapes by Matveyev never represent original landscapes with photographic precision. In contrast, his drawings are much more skewed towards Romanticism, and may actually be first Russian Romantic landscapes.

Fyodor Matveyev's works

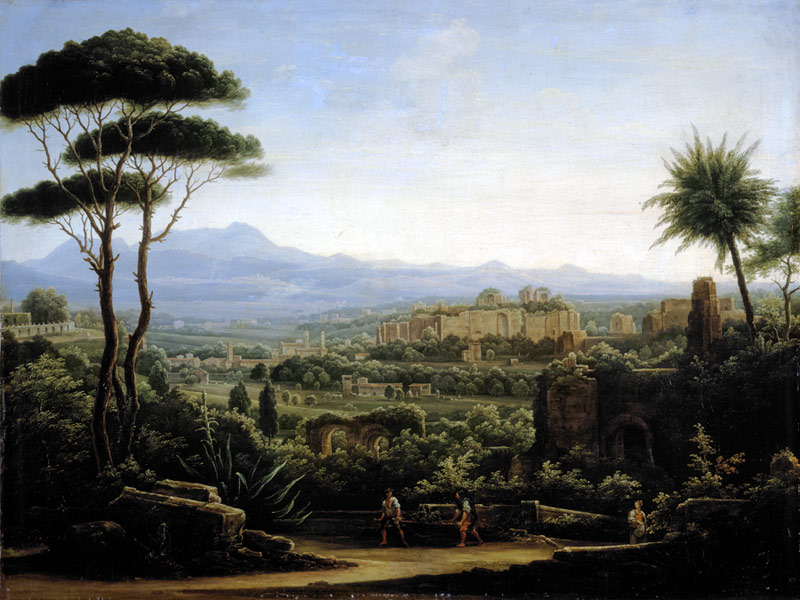
A landscape in the vicinity of Tivoli (1819)

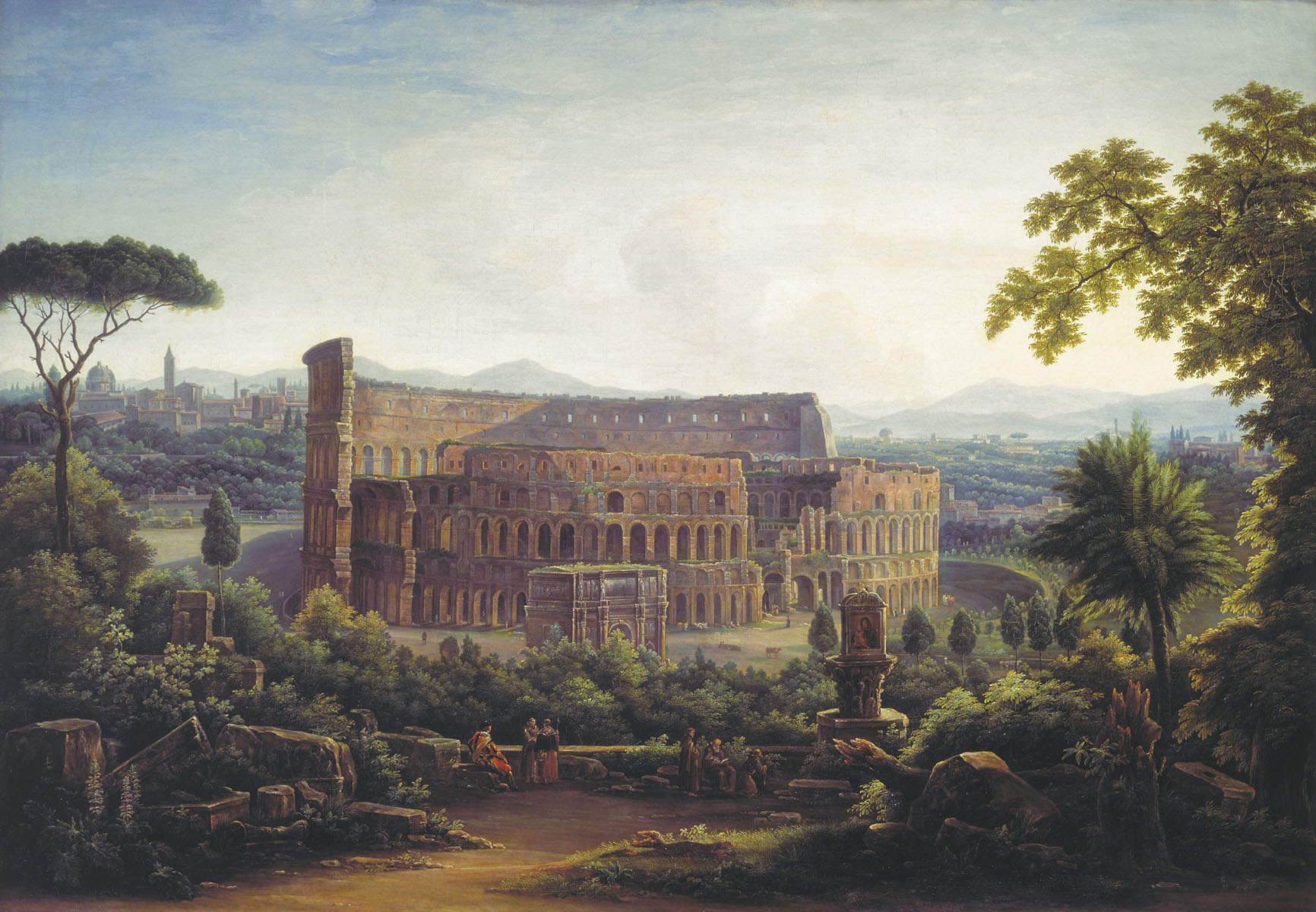
View of Rome. Colosseum (1816)

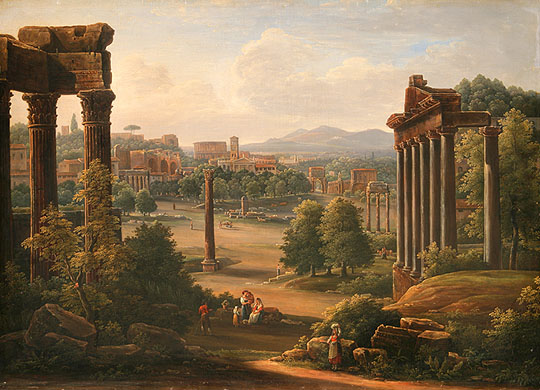
View of Rome. Ruins of the Forum (1816)

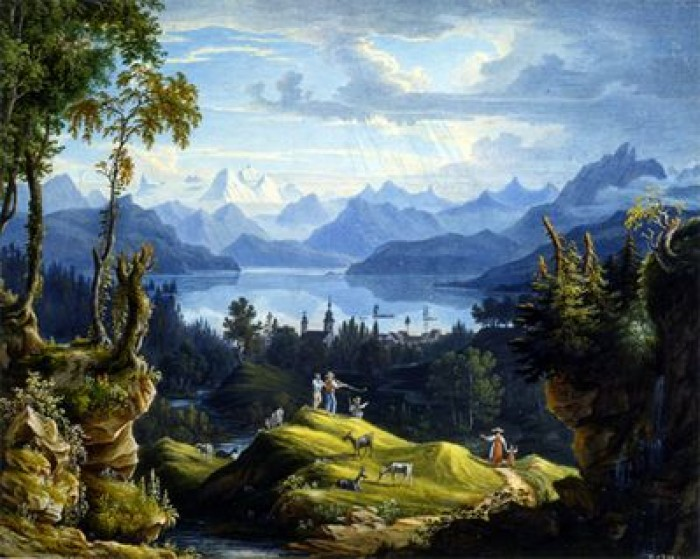
Swiss landscape (1818)

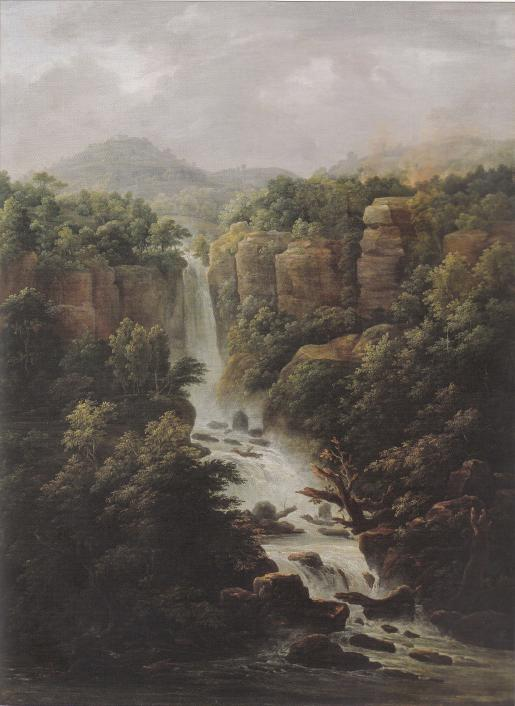
Cascades of the Papal Palacein the vicinity of Rome (1818)

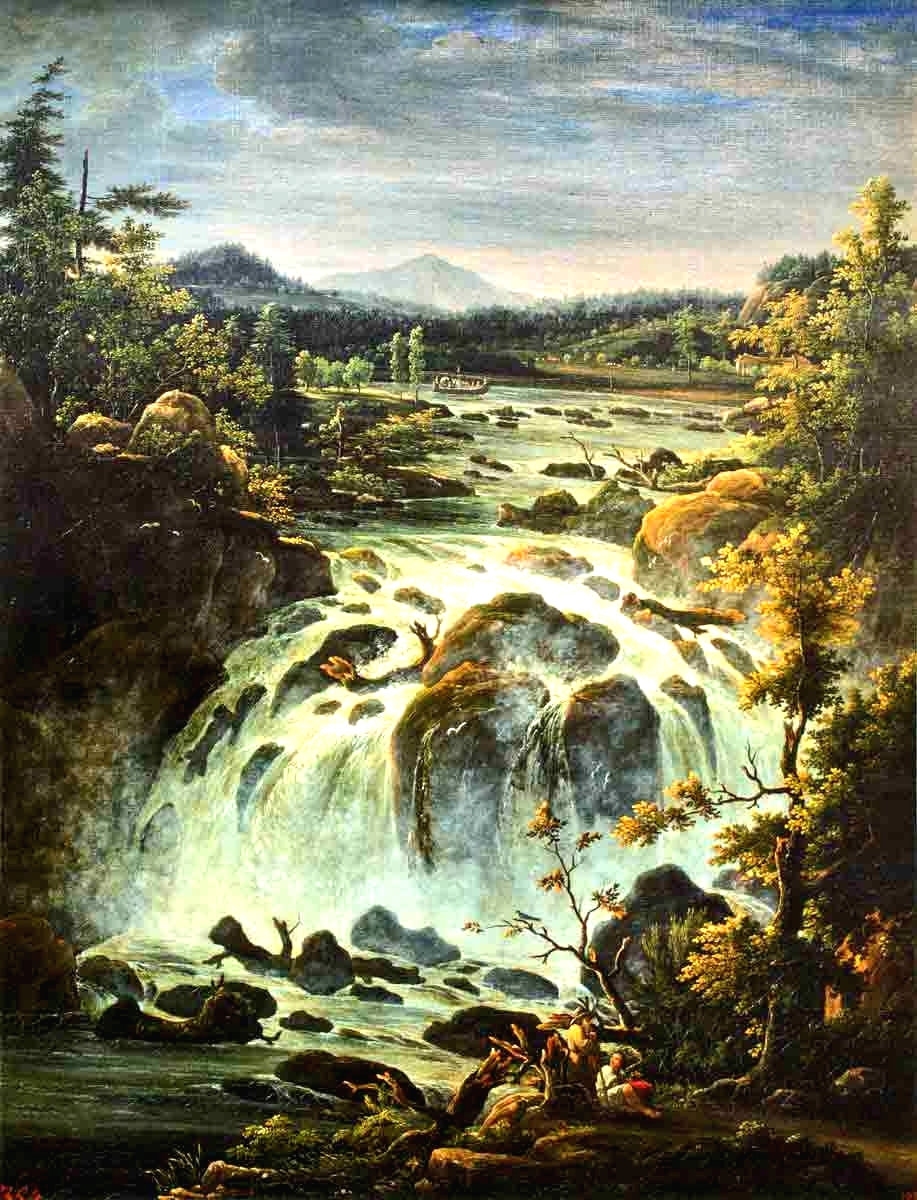
Imatra Falls in Finland (1819)
