= Nadezhda Kalinina =

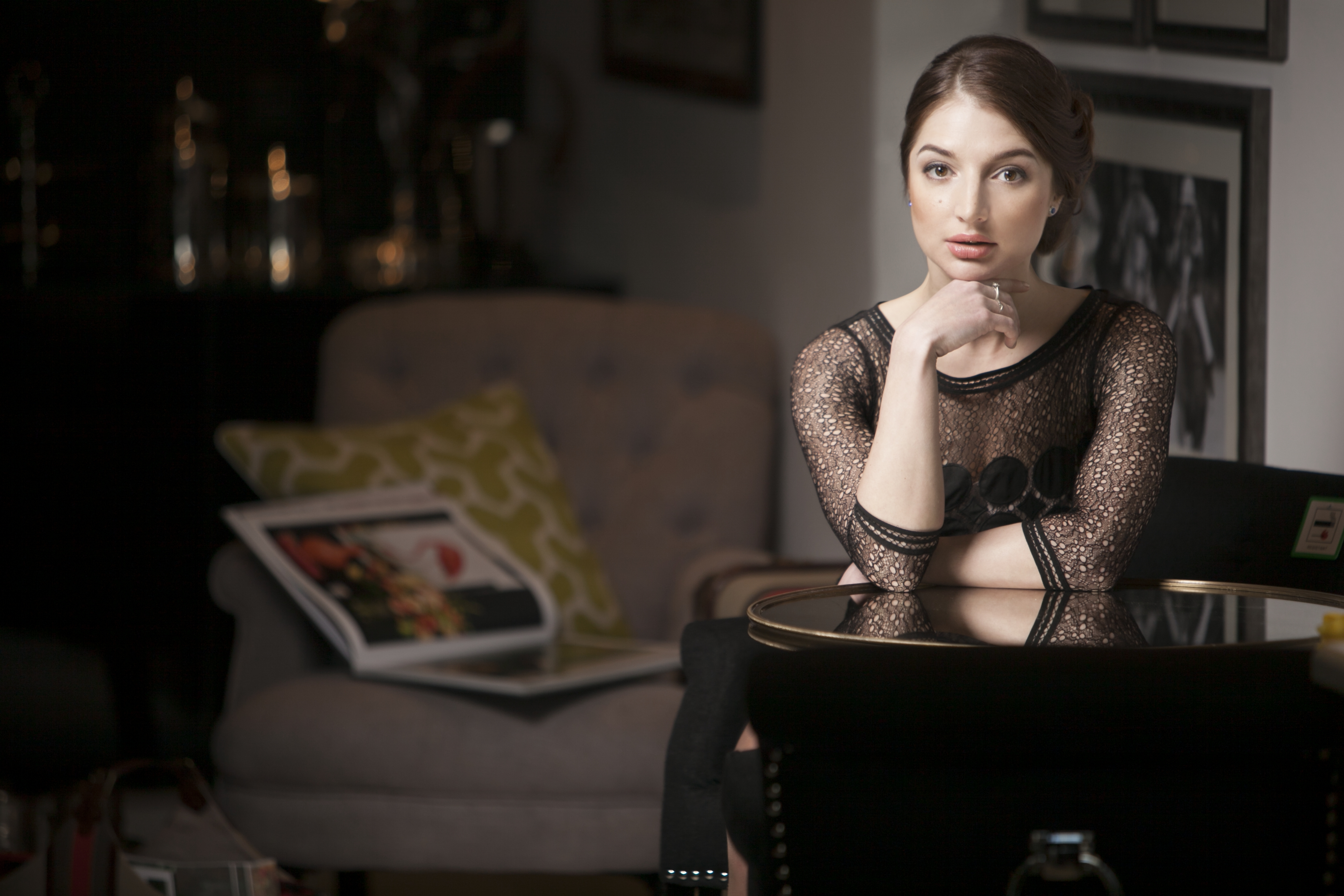
- Born: 22 October 1982 (age 43); Tynda, Amur Region
- Education: Choreographer
- Alma mater: St. Petersburg Conservatory
- Occupation: Chief Choreographer of the Omsk State Musical Theater Chief choreographer of the State Musical Theater St. Petersburg Chamber Opera Company
- Years active: 2002–present

Nadezhda Kalinina (Russian: Надежда Станиславовна Калинина); is a Russian choreographer, Chief choreographer of the Omsk State Musical Theater, Prize-winner at the III International Theatre Forum The Golden Knight (the ballet, The Overcoat, 2010), Recipient of the silver award at the I Federal Festival Theatre Olympus (the ballet, The Overcoat, 2011), Winner of the IV Russian festival Volga Theater Seasons in the nomination The Best Choreographer (the ballet, Idiot, 2018).

== Early life and training ==
She was born on 22 October 1982 in Tynda, Amur Region. Nadezhda Kalinina began her ballet training at the age of 5. She managed to master various dance styles such as classical, folk, modern dance. At the age of 14, she already worked as a teacher of choreography in 3 schools of Saint-Peterburg. At the age of 15, she created her first choreographic classes, where she performed her first productions.

In 2002 she graduated from the Leningrad Region College of Culture and the Arts with a degree in a Teacher of Choreography. In 2007 she graduated from the St. Petersburg Conservatory, having specialised in the Art of Choreography (class of Professor Alexander Polubentsev, Honoured Artist of Russia).

== Career ==
At the age of 21, she joined the Russian dance theatre Intelballet as a soloist. In 2007–2009 she accepted the position of The Choreographer at the St. Petersburg Music Hall Theater. In 2010–2012 she became The Chief Choreographer in the Omsk State Musical Theater. In 2012—2013 she was The Chief Choreographer in the Musical Theater of the Republic of Karelia. From 2012 to 2015 she was invited as a choreographer of Astana Ballet. Since 2013, the chief choreographer of the State Musical Theater St. Petersburg Chamber Opera Company. From 2018 - The Chief Choreographer of the Omsk State Musical Theater.

== Repertoire ==
=== She has produced the libretti for and choreographed the ballets ===
- The Overcoat (to music by Bach, Schnittke, Dubinnikov, Shostakovich) (The Omsk State Musical Theater, 2009)
- Naked Tango (to music by Piazzolla) (The Omsk State Musical Theater, 2011)
- The Little Humpbacked Horse (to music by Shchedrin) (The Musical Theater of the Republic of Karelia, 2013)
- Aibolit (to music by Morozov) (The Voronezh Choreographic School, 2014)
- Carmen (to music by Bizet) (The State Yaushev Musical Theatre, Republic of Moldova, 2014)
- Idiot (to music by Tchaikovsky) (The Omsk State Musical Theater, 2015)
- Little Humpbacked Horse (to music by Shchedrin) (The State Philharmonic of Altai Area, 2015)
- Buchholz (to music by Prokofiev, Borodin) (The Omsk State Musical Theater, 2016)
- Ida (Bolero) (to music by French and Spanish composers of the 19th century) (in collaboration with Arameproduction), (Chelyabinsk Opera and Ballet Theater, 2016)
- Petrushka (to music by Stravinsky) (The State Philharmonic of Altai Area, 2017)
- Little Humpbacked Horse (to music by Shchedrin) (The Musical Theater of the Republic of Mordovia, 2017)
- Esmeralda (to music by French and German composers of the 19th century) (Omsk State Musical Theater, 2018) [17]
- Carmina Burana (to music by Orff) (in collaboration with Arameproduction, Chelyabinsk Opera and The Ballet Theater of Glinka, 2018)
- Tales of Hoffmann (to music by Offenbach) (in collaboration with “Arameproduction”, The National Theater of Opera and Ballet of the Republic, 2019)
- Cinderella (to music by Prokofiev) (The Omsk Musical Theater, 2019)

Nadezhda Kalinina is a choreographer of more than 60 choreographic performances and miniatures for various theatrical, concert programs. Nadezhda worked and continues to work in such genres as opera, operetta, musicals with such directors as Y. Alexandrov, K. Strezhnev, A. Lebedev, V. Kapp, O. Malikova, A. Zabelin, S. Pantykin, O. Chichilanova, V. Miller and others. Her works were choreographed in theatres of Russia and other countries, including the Mariinsky Theater, the St Petersburg Chamber Opera Company, the St Petersburg Theater of Musical Comedy, the Voronezh State Opera and Ballet Theater, the National Opera and Ballet Theater of Baiseitova, the Rostov State Musical Theater, the Omsk State Musical Theater, the Musical Theater of the Republic of Karelia, the Sverdlovsk State Theater of Musical Comedy, the St. Petersburg State Theater Through the Looking Glass, Teatro Lirico Cagliari, etc.

=== She choreographed and staged more than sixty operas, operettas, musicals ===
- 2007, Diva (to music by composers of the 20th century, St. Petersburg Music Hall Theater)
- 2008, Christmas Eve (to music by Rimsky-Korsakov, Mariinsky Theater)
- 2008, The Gentle Queen (to music by Ignatiev, St. Petersburg Music Hall Theater)
- 2010, Astana (to music by Serkebaeva, the National Opera and Ballet Theater of Baiseitova)
- 2011, Carmen (to music by Bizet, the Musical Theater of the Republic of Karelia)
- 2011, Prime Gipsy (to music by Kálmán, the Sverdlovsk Theater of Musical Comedy)
- 2012, Madame Butterfly (to music by Puccini, the St Petersburg Chamber Opera Company)
- 2013, Mr X (to music by Kálmán, the Karaganda Theater of Musical Comedy)
- 2014, Cherevichki (to music by Tchaikovsky, Liriko di Cagliari)
- 2014, Not Only Love (to music by Shchedrin, the St Petersburg Chamber Opera Company)
- 2014, Crimea (to music by Koval, the St Petersburg Chamber Opera Company)
- 2015, The Pearl Seekers (to music by Bizet, the St Petersburg Chamber Opera Company)
- 2015, The Barber of Seville (to music by Rossini, the St Petersburg Chamber Opera Company)
- 2016, Joan of Arc (to music by Verdi, the Rostov Musical Theater)
- 2016, The Corneville Bells (to music by Plunkett, the St PetersburgChamber Opera Company)
- 2016, Love Drink (to music by Donizetti, the St Petersburg Chamber Opera Company)
- 2017, Faust (to music by Gounod, the St Petersburg Chamber Opera Company)
- 2018, Silva (to music by Kálmán, Rostov Musical Theater, dir. A. Negorov)
- 2018, Silva (to music by Kálmán, the St Petersburg Chamber Opera Company)
