= Semyon Shchedrin =

Russian landscape painter

- Семён Фёдорович Щедрин
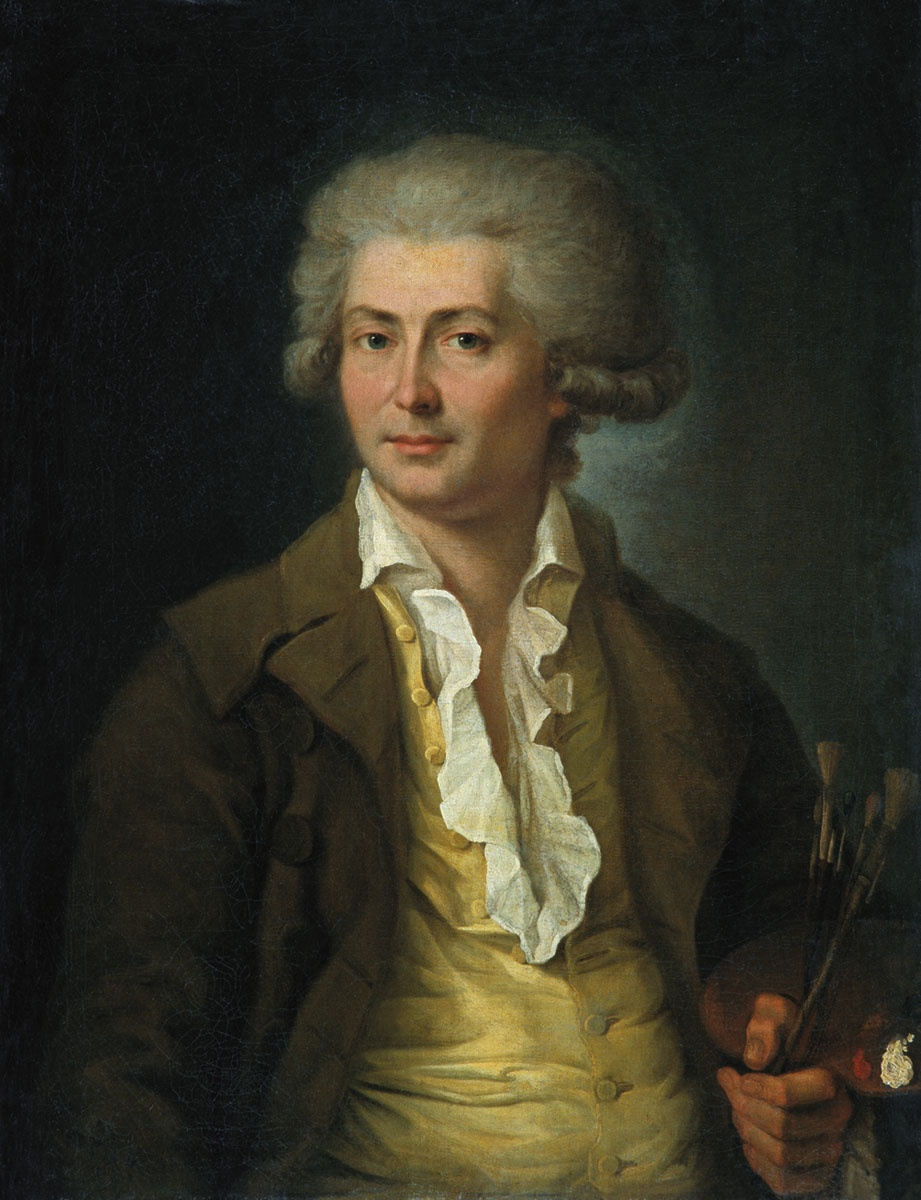
- Self-Portrait, 1780s, oil on canvas, 79.5 by 62.5 cm, Russian Museum, Saint Petersburg
- Born: April 6, 1745; St. Petersburg
- Died: September 1, 1804 (aged 59); St. Petersburg
- Education: Member Academy of Arts (1779)
- Alma mater: Imperial Academy of Arts (1867)
- Known for: Painting

Semyon Fyodorovich Shchedrin (1745–1804) was a Russian landscape painter, the uncle and mentor of Sylvester Shchedrin. Member of the Imperial Academy of Arts.

== Biography ==
He was born in St. Petersburg into the family of a life guard. In 1759, he entered the Academy of Arts in St. Petersburg, and in 1765 graduated with a gold medal and grants to study abroad. Shchedrin ventured to Paris, then to Rome. In Paris he studied the works of old and contemporary painters. Under the influence of Rousseau's idea that beauty exists not only in classic patterns of arts but also in everyday life and nature, Shchedrin worked much en plein-air, otherwise known as painting in outdoor environments. In Rome, however, he fell under the influence of classicism, the idea that art should reflect the works of antiquity and thus prolong their successes.

Shchedrin returned to St. Petersburg in 1776 and became a professor of landscape painting in the Academy of Arts. One of his students at the Academy was Fyodor Matveyev. Shchedrin was assigned to draw views of the palaces and parks of Catherine the Great, which brought into existence such works as View of the Large Pond Island in the Tsarskoselsky Gardens (1777), View of the Large Pond in the Tsarskoselsky Gardens (1777), View of the Farmyard in the Tsarskoye Selo (1777). After 1780, Shchedrin also participated in the restoration of pictures in the Hermitage, and in 1799 he headed a new class of landscape graphics.

The pinnacle of his art career came in the 1790s. The most famous of his works of the period are views of parks and palaces in Pavlovsk, Gatchina, and Petergof: The Mill and the Peel Tower at Pavlovsk (1792), View of the Gatchina Palace from the Silver Lake (1798), View of the Gatchina Palace from Long Island (1798), The Stone Bridge at Gatchina (1799–1801), View of the Kamennoostrovsky Palace through Bolshaya Nevka from the Stroganov Seashore (1803). The composition of all of his works is the same in accordance with the rules of academic classicism.

== Gallery ==
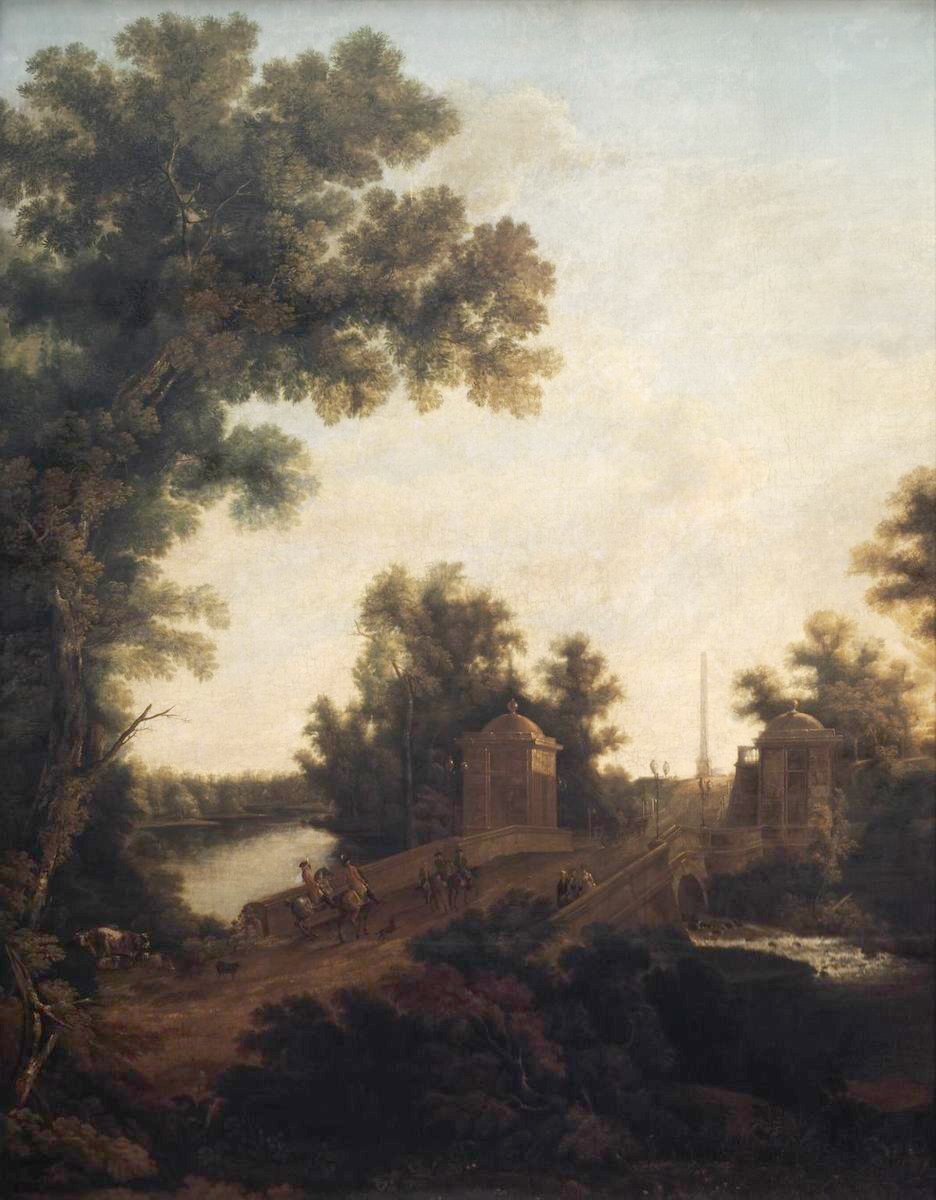
The Stone Bridge at Gatchina

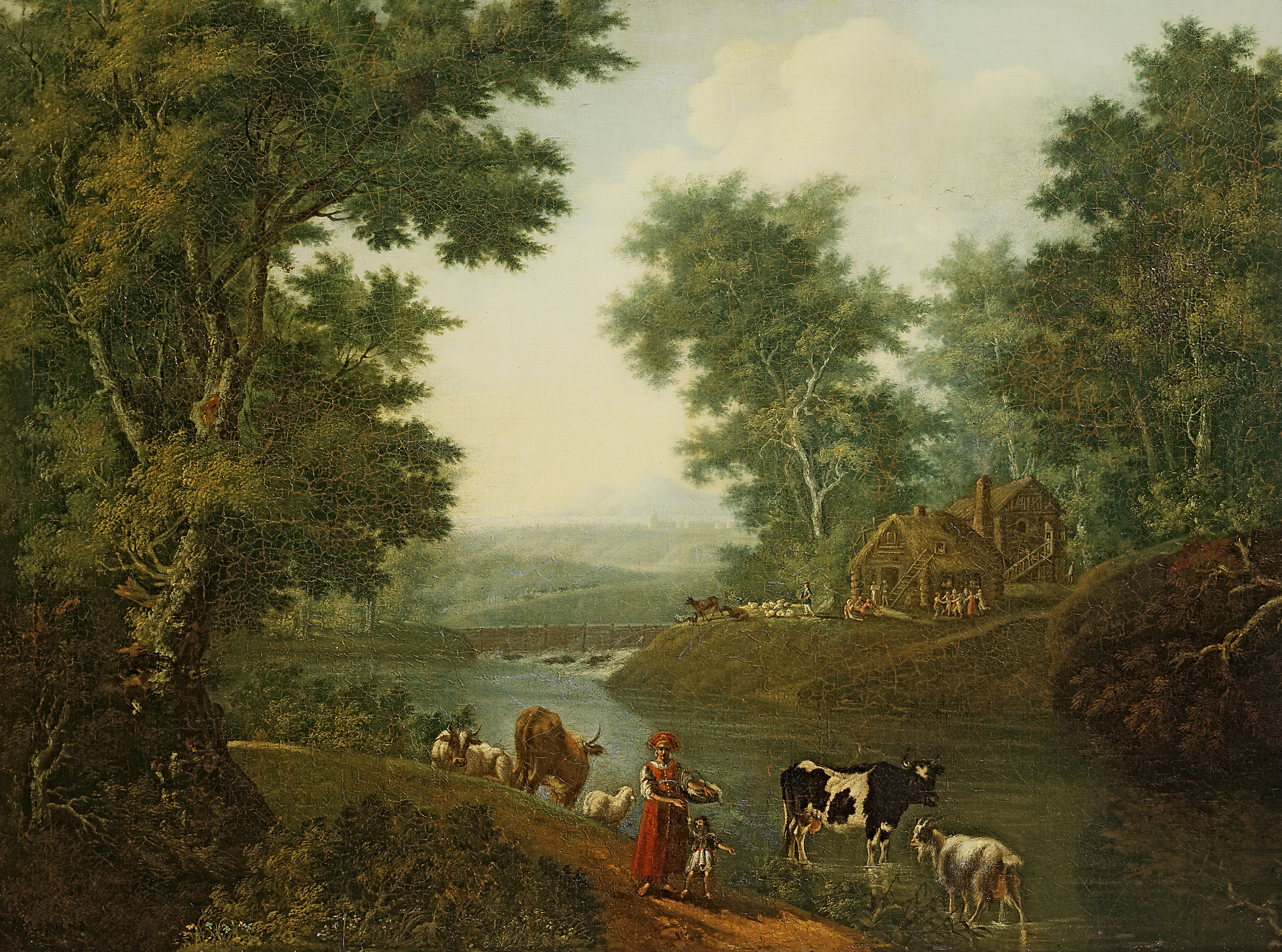
View in Petersburg's Environs

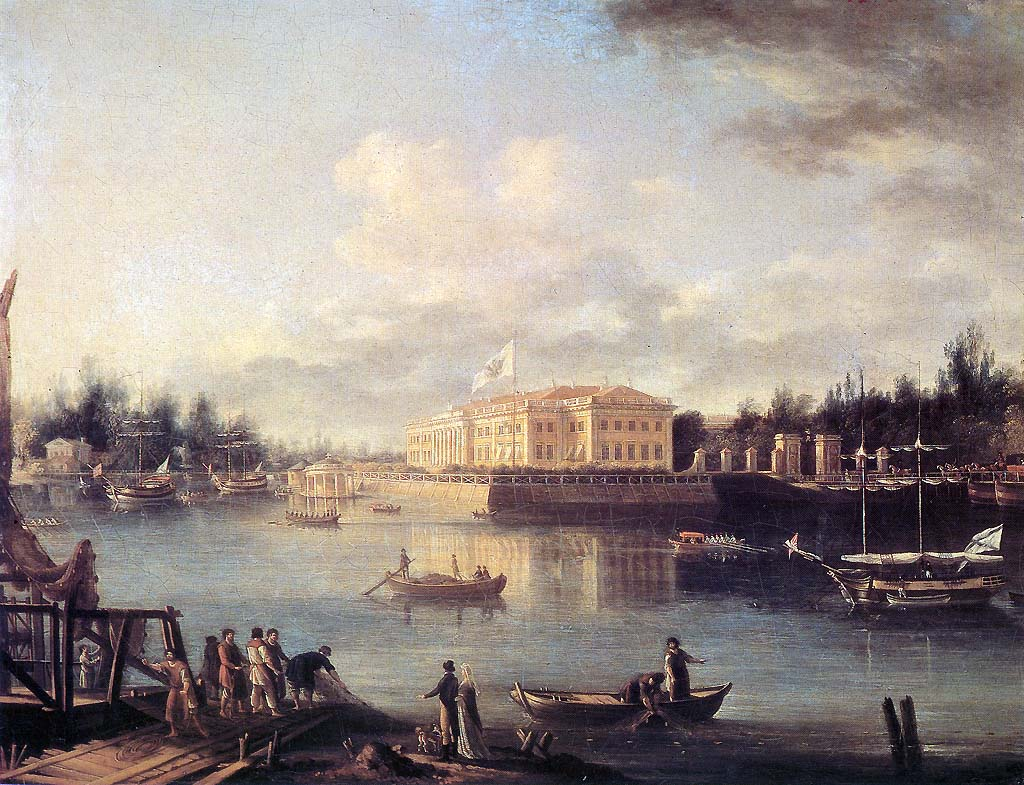
View of Kamenny Island and the Palace in St. Petersburg

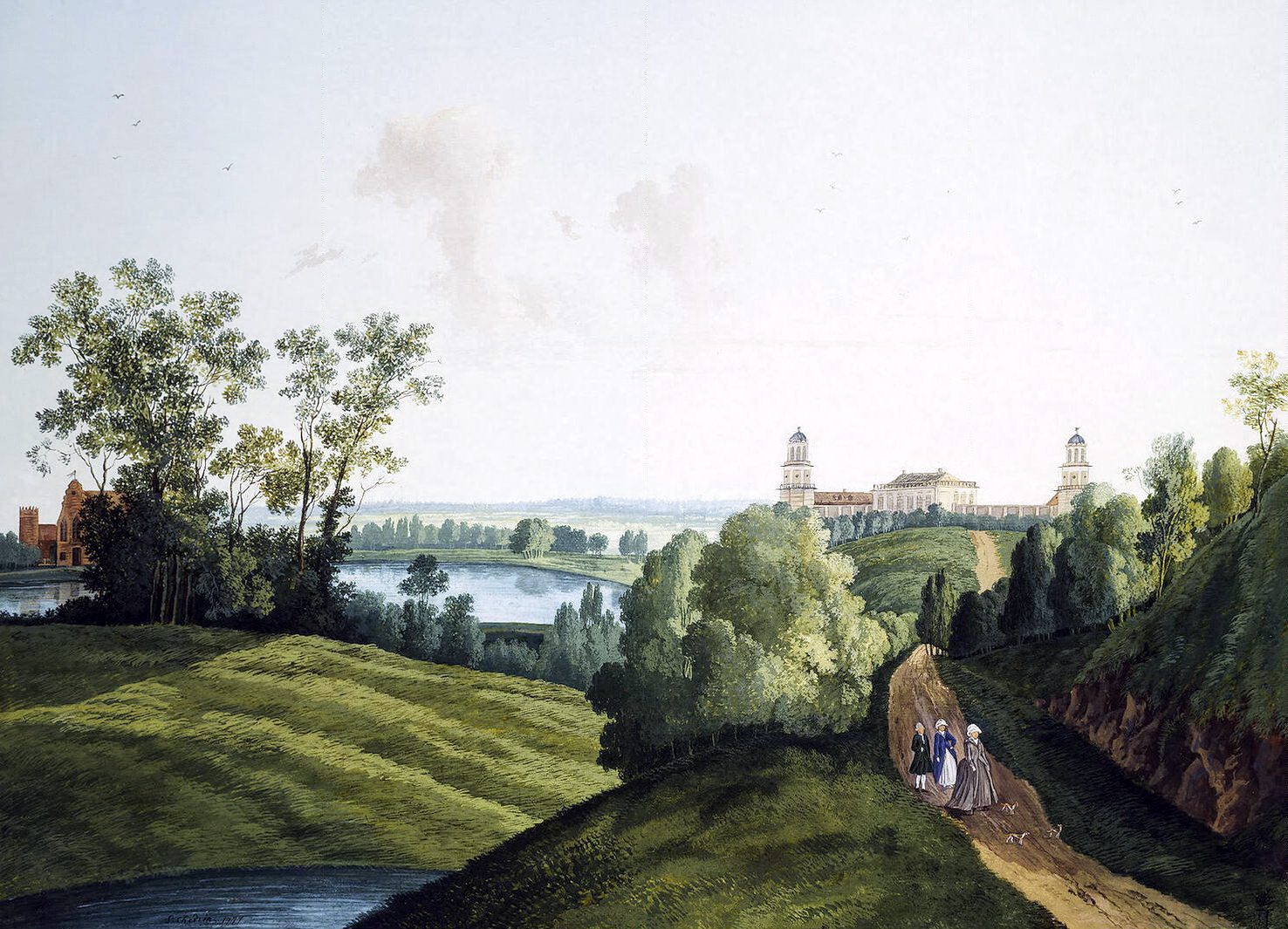
Landscape in the park Tsarskoe Selo
