= Sylvester Shchedrin =

Russian painter

- Сильвестр Феодосиевич Щедрин
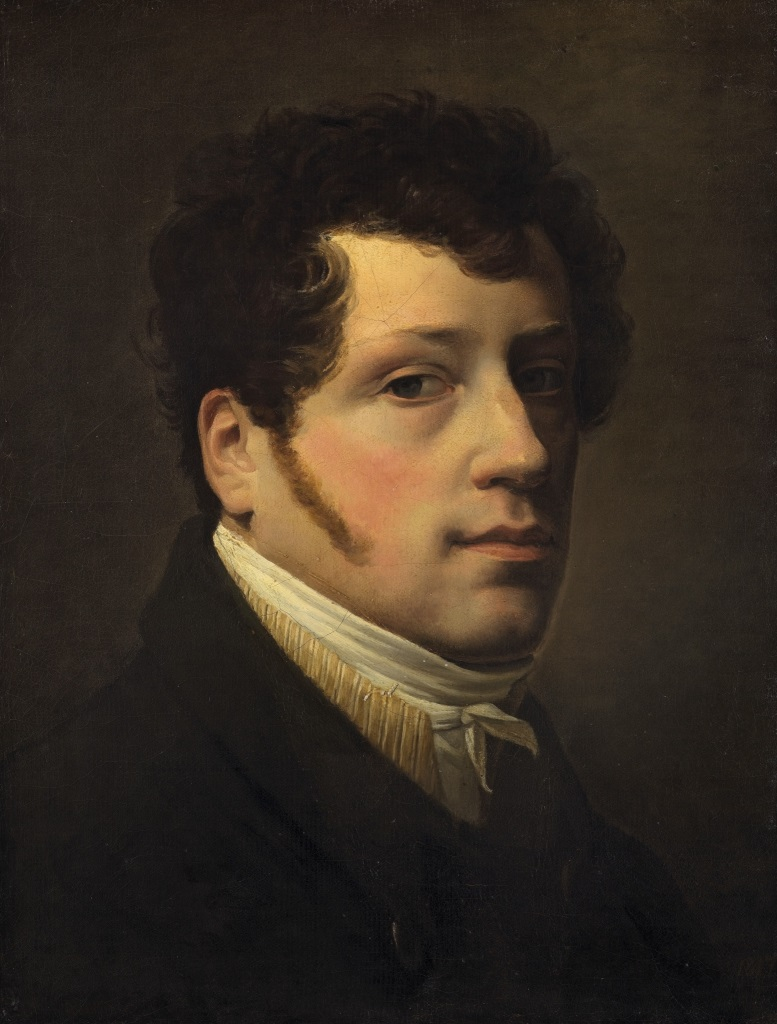
- Self-portrait
- Born: February 2, 1791; Saint Petersburg, Russian Empire
- Died: October 27, 1830 (aged 39); Sorrento, Kingdom of the Two Sicilies
- Education: Imperial Academy of Arts (1811)
- Known for: Painting
- Awards: Big Gold Medal of the Imperial Academy of Arts (1811)

Sylvester Feodosiyevich Shchedrin (Russian: Сильвестр Феодосиевич Щедрин; 13 February 1791 – 8 November 1830) was a Russian landscape painter.

== Biography ==
Sylvester Shchedrin was born in St. Petersburg into the family of the famous sculptor Feodosiy Shchedrin, rector of the Imperial Academy of Arts. The landscape painter Semion Shchedrin was his uncle. In 1800, Sylvester Shchedrin entered the Imperial Academy of Arts in St. Petersburg, where he studied landscape paintings. Among his teachers were his uncle, Semion Shchedrin, Fyodor Alekseyev, M.M. Ivanov and Thomas de Thomon. In 1811 he graduated with several awards including the Large Gold Medal for his painting View from Petrovsky Island that gave him a scholarship to study abroad.

Sylvester left for Italy in 1818, delayed due to the Napoleonic Wars. In Italy, he studied the old masters in Rome; went to Naples to paint watercolors ordered by Grand Duke Mikhail Pavlovich of Russia; then returned to Rome. The biggest achievement of that period was New Rome. Castel Sant'Angelo (1823). It was such a great success that he painted 8-10 variations of the painting, each from a slightly different angle and with different details. His pension ended in 1823, but he decided to stay abroad as a freelance painter. In 1825 he finished his work Lake of Albano that was a new step in his movement to natural composition. In this painting he relaxed the boundary between subject and background, and moved from using formal colors.

Shchedrin had many commissions and grew to become a well-known artist in Italy. He lived in Rome and Naples, working en plein air, drawing bays and cliffs and views of small towns and fishermen villages. One of his favorite motifs were terraces in vines with a view of the sea. Referred as the images of the "Midday Paradis". At the end of the 1820s, Shchedrin began to draw uneasy, almost nightmarish nocturnal landscapes, which may have been inspired by his gradually declining health. He died in Sorrento in 1830. In a sense, the works of Shchedrin concluded a period of development of Russian art and started a new period.

Shchedrin influenced not only Russian art but Italian art as well. He was one of the founders of the so-called Posillipo school. Many of his works are in Italian museums while some were returned to Russia. Shchedrin's letters full of important artistic observations were published as a book (Shchedrin Letters from Italy) in 1932 and reprinted in 1978.

== Works ==
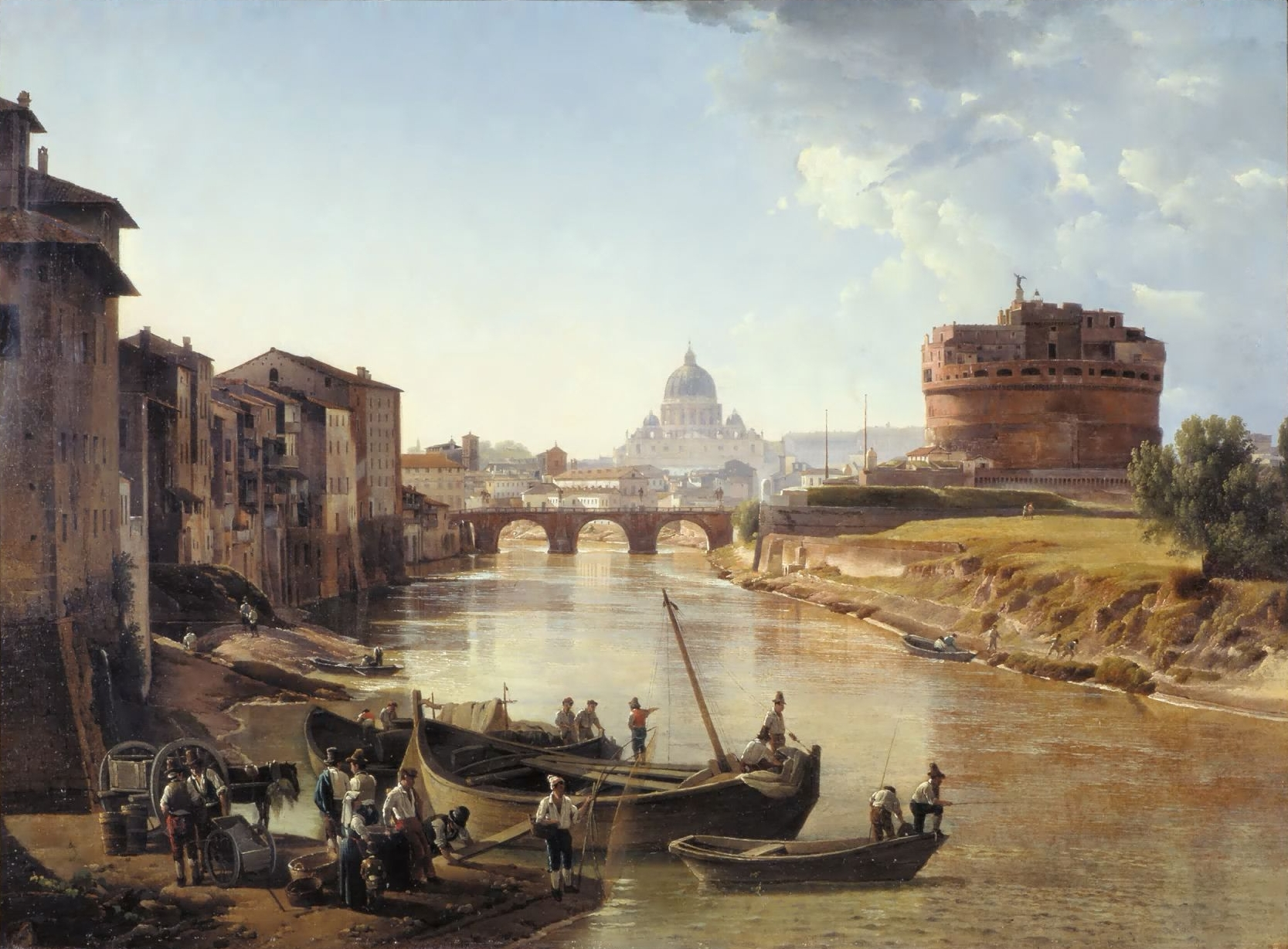
New Rome. Castel Sant'Angelo (1823)

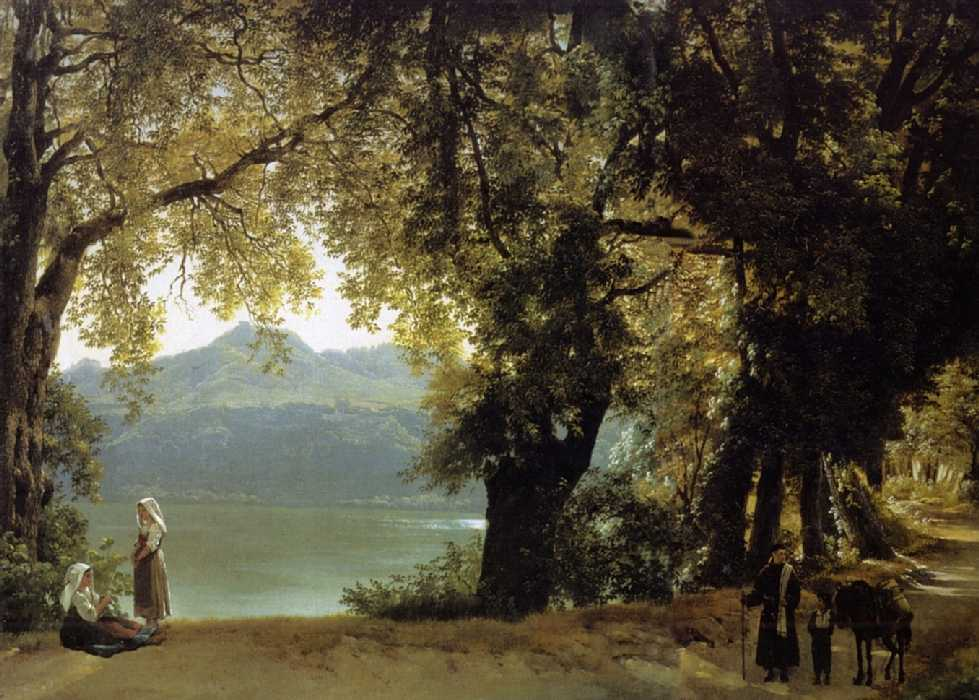
Lake of Albano (1825)

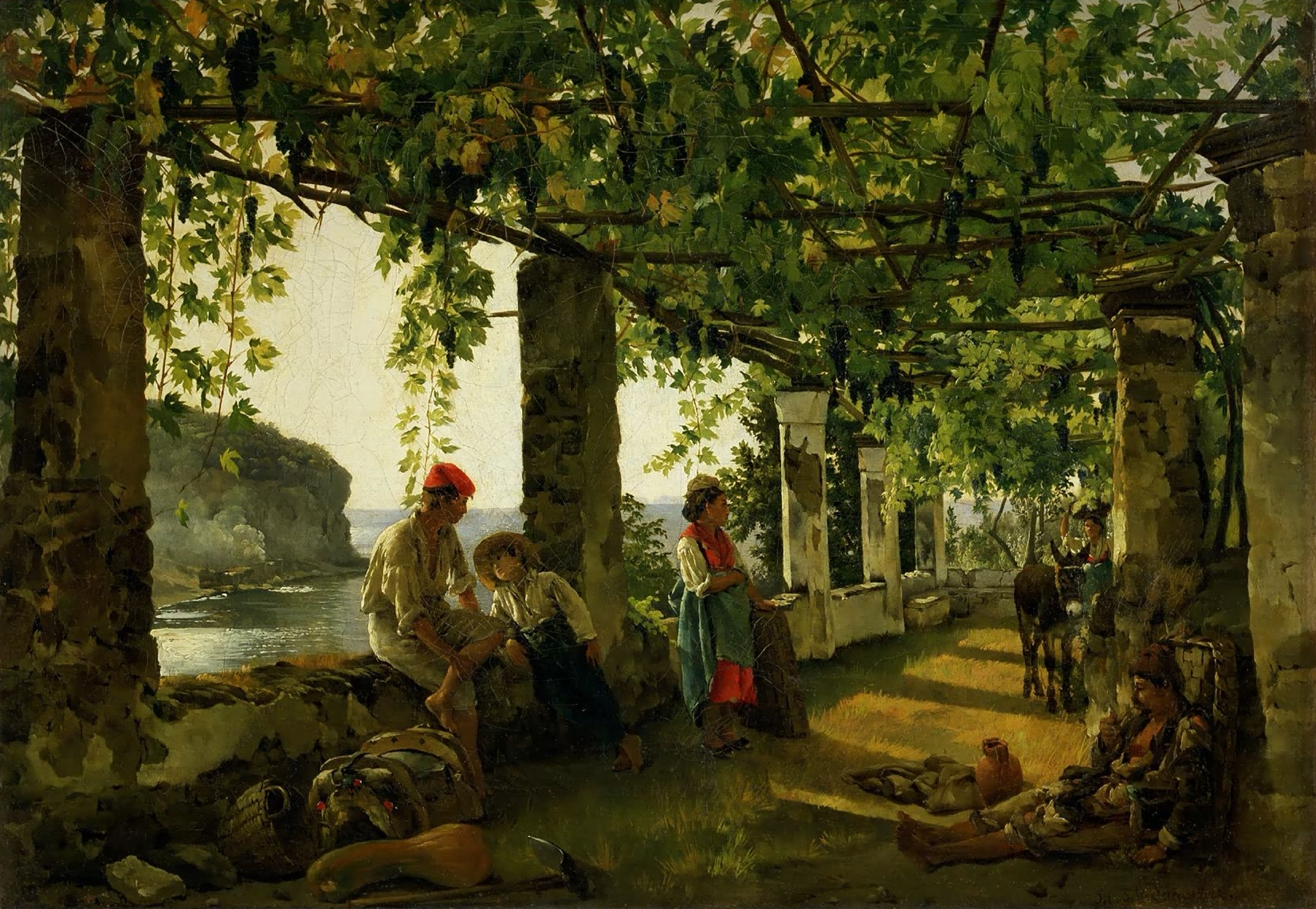
Terrace on the Seashore

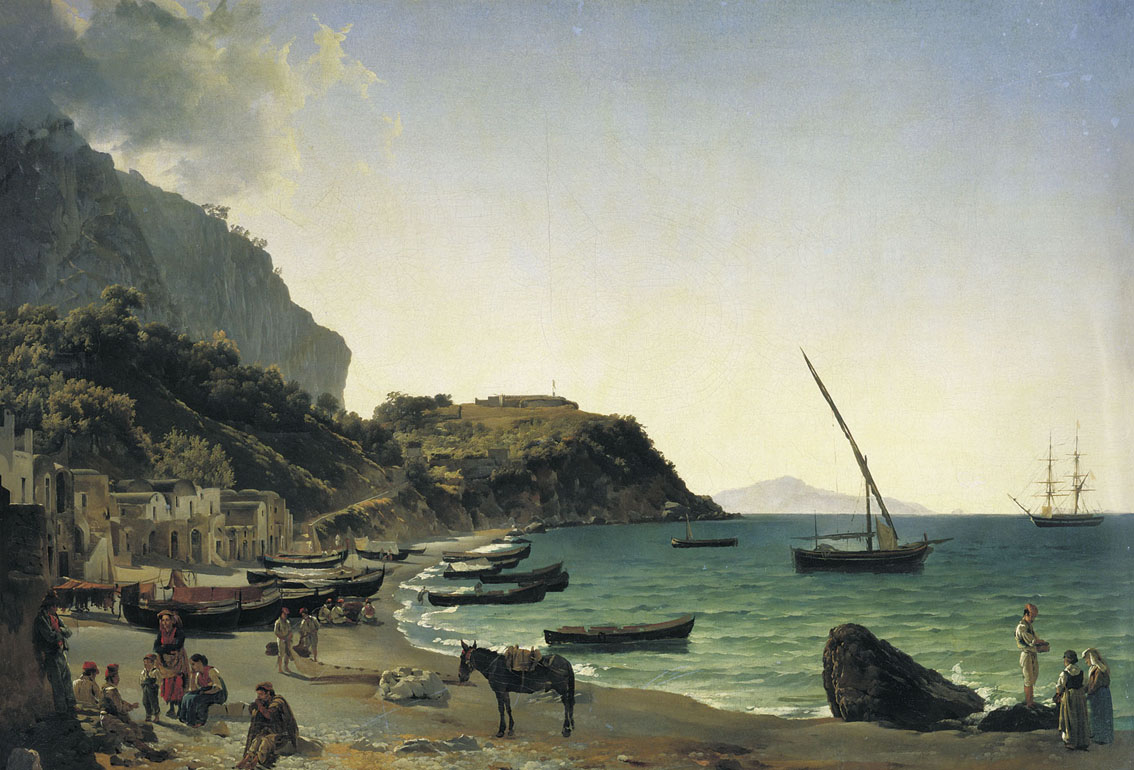
Marina Grande, Capri

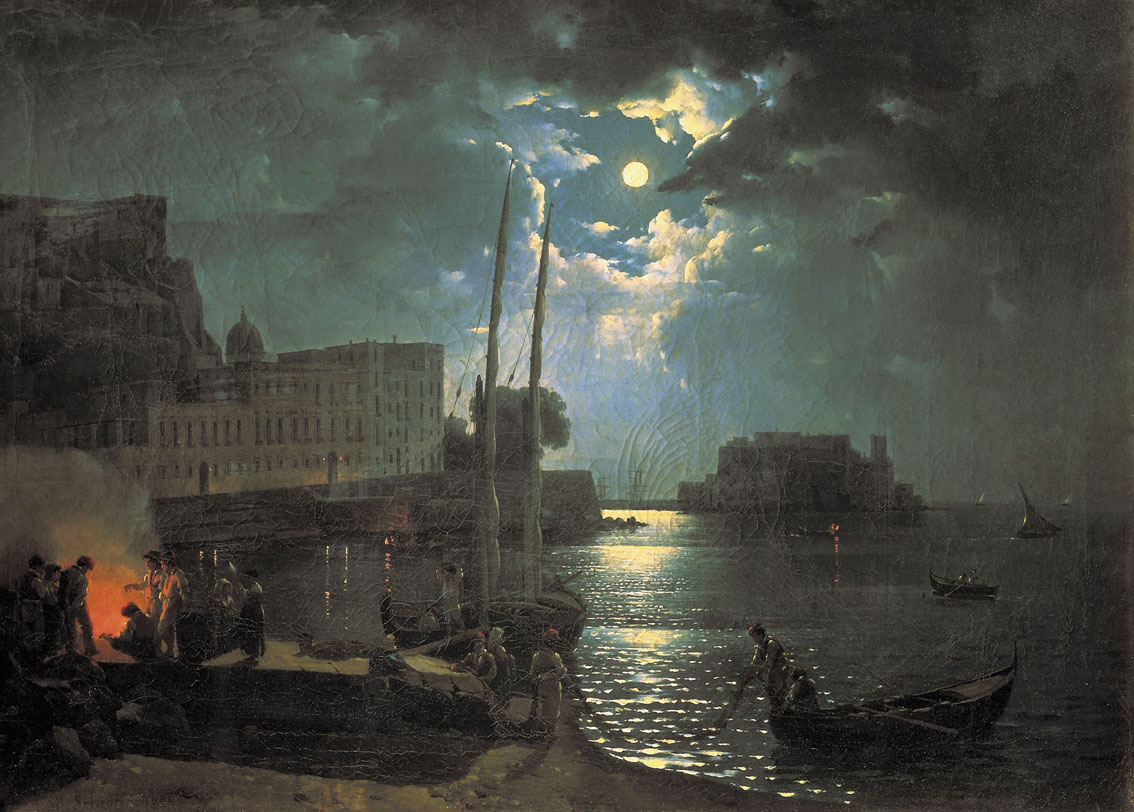
Moonlit Night in Naples

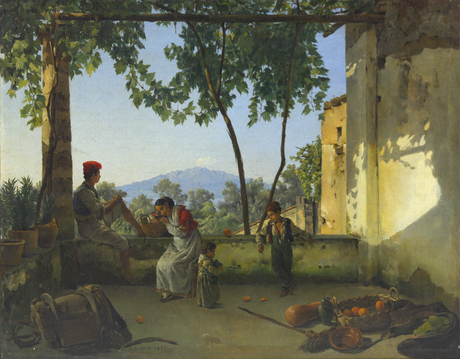
Balcony in Sorrento

== See also ==
- List of Russian artists
